= Georgia State Route 32 =

State highway in Georgia

State Route 32
- SR 32 highlighted in red

Route information
- Maintained by GDOT
- Length: 189.08 mi (304.29 km)
- Existed: 1919–present

Major junctions
- West end: SR 45 / SR 520 in Dawson
- US 19 / SR 3 in Leesburg; US 41 / SR 7 / SR 112 in Ashburn; I-75 east of Sycamore; US 129 / US 319 / SR 11 / SR 35 / SR 90 in Ocilla; US 221 / US 441 / SR 31 / SR 135 in Douglas; US 1 / US 23 / SR 4 in Alma; US 84 / SR 38 in Patterson; US 301 / SR 23 in Hortense
- East end: US 25 / US 341 / SR 27 / SR 99 in Sterling

Location
- Country: United States
- State: Georgia
- Counties: Terrell, Lee, Worth, Turner, Irwin, Coffee, Bacon, Pierce, Brantley, Glynn

Highway system
- Georgia State Highway System; Interstate; US; State; Special
← SR 31	→ SR 33

State Route 32 (SR 32) is a 189.08-mile-long (304.29 km) state highway that travels west-to-east through portions of Terrell, Lee, Worth, Turner, Irwin, Coffee, Bacon, Pierce, Brantley, and Glynn counties in the southern part of the U.S. state of Georgia. The highway connects Dawson with Sterling, via Leesburg, Ashburn, Fitzgerald, Douglas, and Alma.

== Route description ==
=== Dawson to Sycamore ===
SR 32 begins at an intersection with SR 45/SR 520 in Dawson, within Terrell County. Approximately 3,500 feet (1,100 m) later, it meets the west end of SR 118 (Crawford Street NE). Then, it leaves town, heading east. After the highway enters Lee County, it curves to the south. Then, it gradually curves to the southeast. Just before entering Leesburg, SR 32 curves to the east, crosses over Kinchafoonee Creek. In town, it intersects US 19 Byp./SR 3 Byp. The three highways travel concurrent to the southeast for just over 1,000 feet (300 m), to an intersection with US 19/SR 3 (Walnut Street). At this intersection, US 19 Byp./SR 3 Byp. end and SR 32 travels to the north, concurrent with US 19/SR 3. At 4th Street East, SR 32 departs the concurrency to the east. One block later, it meets SR 195 (Leslie Highway). At this intersection, it turns to the south and curves to the east. Just before leaving town, the highway passes Leesburg Cemetery. Farther to the east, it crosses over Muckalee Creek. Then, it meets SR 91 before crossing over the Flint River into Worth County. Just under 2 miles (3.2 km) into the county, it intersects SR 300 (Georgia–Florida Parkway). It curves southeast to an intersection with SR 313 in Doles. Continuing to the east, it intersects SR 33. Just over 0.5 miles (0.80 km) later, it enters Turner County. The highway curves back to the northeast and enters Ashburn. In the city, it intersects SR 112 (West Washington Street). The two highways begin a concurrency to the main part of the city. At the intersection with US 41/SR 7, SR 112 continues to the northeast, while SR 32 turns right onto US 41/SR 7. The three highways head concurrent into Sycamore. Just outside Ashburn, they pass the Turner County Airport.

=== Sycamore to Sterling ===
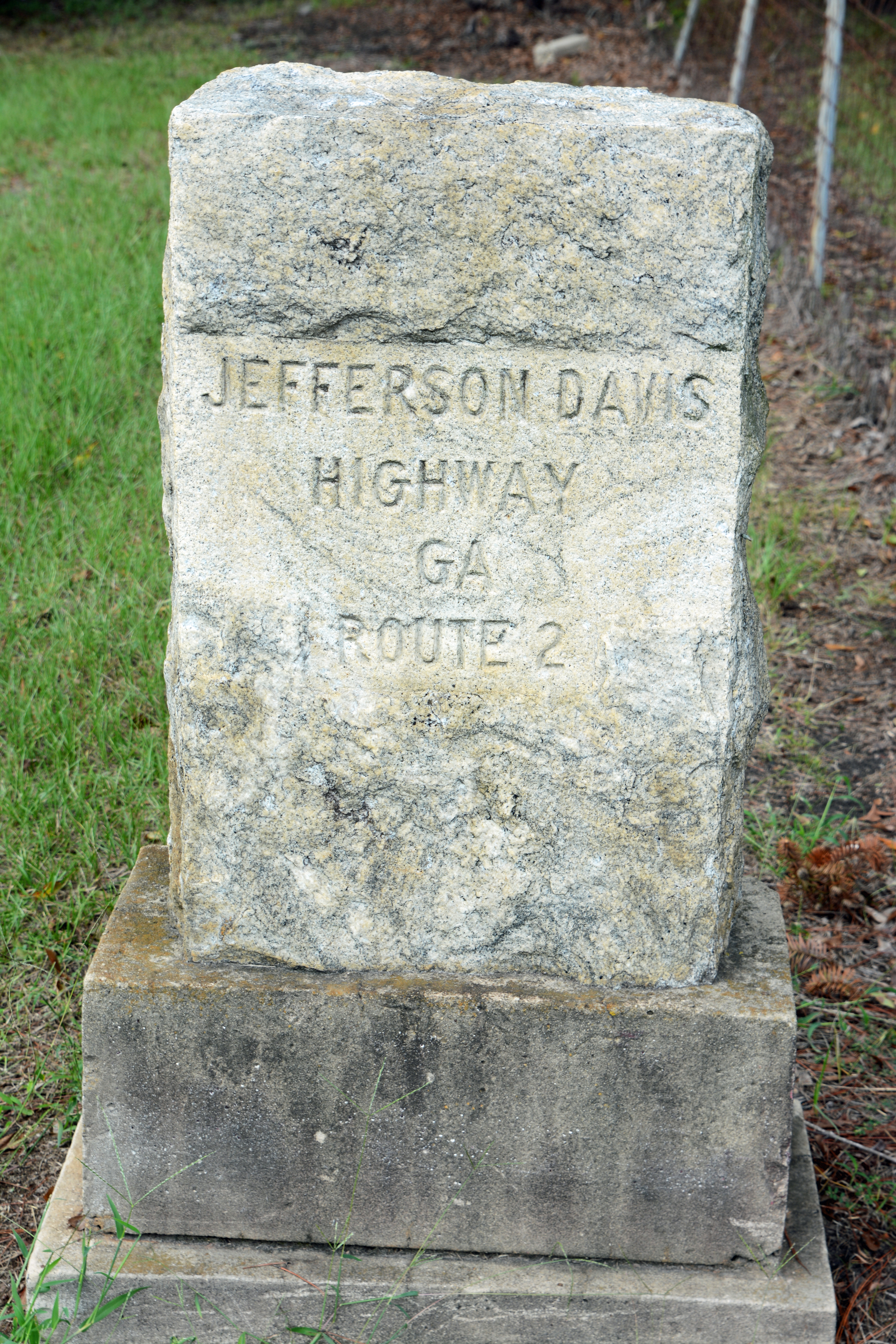
Jefferson Davis Highway marker in Irwinville 31.64832°N 83.38270°W

In Sycamore, SR 32 splits off to the east-northeast and immediately meets the eastern end of SR 32 Conn. Just to the east is an interchange with Interstate 75 (I-75). Then, it passes Pleasant Hill Cemetery and curves to the east. After that, it passes Bethel Cemetery and curves again to the southeast. Later on, it curves to the east and enters Irwin County a short distance later. SR 32 curves to the northeast and begins a concurrency with SR 125 (Waterloo Highway). The two highways head east over the Alapaha River, pass Burton Lake, Oak Grove Cemetery, and Brown Lake, before traveling through Irwinville. At Hogan Lake, SR 32 departs to the southeast and enters Ocilla. In the western part of the city, it intersects US 319/SR 35. The three highways travel concurrently into the main part of the city. They have an intersection with US 129/SR 11/SR 90 (Irwin Avenue). At this intersection, SR 35 reaches its northern end, while US 319 turns left onto US 129/SR 11/SR 90, and SR 32 continues to the east. Along its routing, it crosses over the Willacoochee River, curves to the east-southeast, and enters Coffee County. southwest of Ambrose, the highway has an intersection with both the northern end of SR 149 and the southern end of SR 268. SR 32 continues to the east, traveling through rural areas of the county and enters Douglas. There, it intersects SR 206 (Bowens Mill Road). Then, it intersects US 441/SR 31 in the main part of the city. Just before leaving Douglas, it intersects US 221/SR 135 (Bowens Mill Road SE). About 3 miles (4.8 km) later, the highway passes General Coffee State Park and crosses over 17 Mile River. It travels through Nicholls and curves to the northeast into Bacon County. The highway heads east to enter Alma. There, it intersects SR 4 Alt. (Dixon Street). A few blocks later, in the main part of town, it intersects US 1/SR 4 (Pierce Street). The highway travels one block north of Rose Hill Cemetery. It curves to the southeast just before intersecting SR 203 in New Lacy. The two highways have a very brief concurrency to the southeast. Continuing east, it enters Pierce County. SR 32 travels through Mershon and enters Bristol, where it intersects SR 15/SR 121. Farther to the east, in Patterson, is an intersection with US 84/SR 38. The highway crosses over the Little Satilla River into Brantley County. In Hortense, it intersects US 301/SR 23, then proceeds to Needmore, where it meets the northern end of SR 110. It curves to the southeast and enters Glynn County. In Anguilla, it begins a concurrency with SR 99. The two highways curve to the east and enter Sterling. There, they intersect US 25/US 341/SR 27. At this intersection, SR 32 meets its eastern end, while SR 99 continues to the east.

=== National Highway System ===
The entire length of SR 32 is part of the National Highway System, a system of routes determined to be the most important for the nation's economy, mobility, and defense.

== History ==
=== 1920s ===
SR 32 was established at least as early as 1919 from SR 1 in Cuthbert east-southeast to Dawson, southeast to Albany, east-southeast to Sylvester, northeast to Ashburn, east-southeast to the approximate location of Nicholls, and east-northeast to SR 15 in Alma. By the end of September 1921, the western terminus was truncated to SR 7 in Sycamore. The former path of SR 32 from Cuthbert to Sylvester was redesignated as SR 50. SR 32 was established on a segment from SR 27 in Baxley east-northeast and north-northwest to SR 23 in the southeastern part of Reidsville, with the Alma–Baxley segment in-between proposed. By October 1926, US 41 was designated on SR 7 in Sycamore. US 1 was designated on SR 32 on the then-completed Alma–Baxley segment. By October 1929, the eastern terminus of SR 32 was truncated to US 1/SR 4 in Alma.

=== 1930s to 2000s ===
In February 1934, the eastern terminus of SR 32 was extended east-southeast and southeast to SR 38 in Patterson. In the first quarter of 1937, the eastern terminus was extended again, east-southeast to US 341/SR 27 in Sterling. At the end of 1940, the western terminus was extended north-northwest on US 41/SR 7 to Ashburn and then west-northwest to Dawson. In the second quarter of 1941, the crossing of the Flint River, east of Leesburg, was indicated to have "no bridge or ferry". Between June 1955 and July 1957, this crossing was no longer indicated to have not bridge or ferry. The entire length of SR 32 was paved. In 1993, a western bypass of Leesburg, designated as SR 910, was proposed from US 19/SR 3, where they met SR 32 just south of the city to US 19/SR 3 north-northwest of it. In 1998, SR 3 Byp. was established on the proposed path of SR 910, including the concurrency with SR 32. In 2007, US 19 Byp. was established on the paths of SR 3 Byp. and SR 32 in Leesburg.

== Major intersections ==
County	Location	mi	km	Destinations	Notes
Terrell	Dawson	0.000	0.000	SR 45 / SR 520 (Roundtree Drive SW / Vine Street NW) – Plains, Richland, Morgan, Albany	Western terminus
Terrell	Dawson	0.657	1.057	SR 118 east (Crawford Street) – Smithville	Western terminus of SR 118
Lee	Leesburg	17.915	28.831	US 19 Byp. north / SR 3 Byp. north – Americus	Western end of US 19 Byp./SR 3 Byp. concurrency
Lee	Leesburg	18.238	29.351	US 19 south / SR 3 south (Walnut Street) / US 19 Byp. ends / SR 3 Byp. ends / SR 32 Truck east (Robert B. Lee Drive) – Albany	Eastern end of US 19 Byp./SR 3 Byp. concurrency; western end of US 19/SR 3 concurrency; southern terminus of US 19 Byp. and SR 3 Byp.; western terminus of SR 32 Truck
Lee	Leesburg	19.078	30.703	US 19 north / SR 3 north (Walnut Avenue North) to SR 195 – Americus	Eastern end of US 19/SR 3 concurrency
Lee	Leesburg	19.110	30.755	Leslie Highway	Former southern terminus of SR 195
Lee		26.611	42.826	SR 91 south – Albany	Northern terminus of SR 91
Flint River		28.305	45.552	Lee–Worth county line	
Worth		30.154	48.528	SR 300 (Georgia–Florida Parkway) – Albany, Cordele	
Worth	Doles	36.846	59.298	SR 313 – Sylvester, Warwick	
Worth		41.929	67.478	SR 33 – Sylvester, Cordele	
Turner	Ashburn	51.190	82.382	SR 112 south (West Washington Street) – Sylvester	Western end of SR 112 concurrency
Turner	Ashburn	51.931	83.575	US 41 north / SR 7 north / SR 112 north (East Washington Avenue) – Cordele, Rebecca	Eastern end of SR 112 concurrency; western end of US 41/SR 7 concurrency
Turner	Sycamore	54.928	88.398	US 41 south / SR 7 south – Tifton	Eastern end of US 41/SR 7 concurrency
Turner	Sycamore	54.973	88.470	SR 32 Conn. west	Eastern terminus of SR 32 Conn.
Turner		56.438	90.828	I-75 (SR 401) – Valdosta, Macon	I-75/SR 401 exit 78
Irwin		68.194	109.748	SR 125 south (Waterloo Highway) – Tifton	Western end of SR 125 concurrency
Irwin		68.465	110.184	Alapaha River	
Irwin		72.685	116.975	SR 125 north (Irwinville Highway) – Fitzgerald	Eastern end of SR 125 concurrency
Irwin	Ocilla	79.532	127.994	US 319 south / SR 35 south – Tifton	Western end of US 319/SR 35 concurrency
Irwin	Ocilla	80.146	128.982	US 129 / SR 11 / SR 90 (Irwin Avenue) / US 319 north / SR 35 south (Irwin Avenue) – Alapaha, Fitzgerald, Willacoochee	Eastern end of US 319/SR 35 concurrency; northern terminus of SR 35
Irwin		84.832	136.524	Willacoochee River	
Coffee		93.520	150.506	SR 149 south / SR 268 north – Willacoochee, Ambrose	Northern terminus of SR 149; southern terminus of SR 268
Coffee	Douglas	103.824	167.089	SR 206 / SR 32 Truck east (Bowens Mill Road SW)	Western terminus of SR 32 Truck
Coffee	Douglas	105.106	169.152	US 441 south / SR 31 south (Peterson Avenue) – Pearson	One-way pair
Coffee	Douglas	105.162	169.242	US 441 north / SR 31 north (Madison Avenue) – Broxton	One-way pair
Coffee	Douglas	106.242	170.980	US 221 north / SR 135 north (Westgreen Road) – Hazlehurst	Western end of US 221/SR 135 concurrency
Coffee	Douglas	106.388	171.215	US 221 south / SR 135 south / SR 32 Truck west (Bowens Mill Road SE) – Pearson	Eastern end of US 221/SR 135 concurrency; eastern terminus of SR 32 Truck
Coffee		111.154	178.885	David Nipper Memorial Bridge over the Seventeen Mile River	
Coffee		111.648	179.680	Lewis C. Adams Jr. Bridge over Otter Creek	
Bacon	Alma	128.354	206.566	Dixon Street	Former SR 4 Alt.
Bacon	Alma	128.723	207.160	US 1 / US 23 / SR 4 (Pierce Street) – Waycross, Baxley, Hazlehurst	
Bacon	New Lacy	134.151	215.895	SR 203 north	Western end of SR 203 concurrency
Bacon		134.330	216.183	SR 203 south – Blackshear	Eastern end of SR 203 concurrency
Pierce	Bristol	145.760	234.578	SR 15 / SR 121 – Blackshear, Baxley, Surrency	
Pierce	Patterson	151.982	244.591	US 84 / SR 38 – Blackshear, Jesup	
Little Satilla River		158.851	255.646	Pierce–Brantley county line	
Brantley	Hortense	163.901	263.773	US 301 / SR 23 – Nahunta, Jesup	
Brantley	Needmore	166.884	268.574	SR 110 south – Atkinson	Northern terminus of SR 110
Glynn	Anguilla	186.142	299.567	SR 99 south	Western end of SR 99 concurrency
Glynn	Sterling	189.077	304.290	US 25 / US 341 / SR 27 (New Jesup Highway) / SR 99 north (Grants Ferry Road) – Brunswick, Jesup, Darien	Eastern terminus; eastern end of SR 99 concurrency
1.000 mi = 1.609 km; 1.000 km = 0.621 mi: Concurrency terminus

== Special routes ==
=== Leesburg truck route ===
State Route 32 Truck
- Location: Leesburg
- Length: 2.6 mi (4.2 km)

State Route 32 Truck (SR 32 Truck) is a 2.6-mile-long (4.2 km) truck route of SR 32 that directs truck traffic from the main part of Leesburg. It begins at an intersection with US 19/SR 3/SR 32 (Walnut Street) in the south-central part of the city. This intersection is also the southern terminus of US 19 Byp./SR 3 Byp. (Dawson Road). It travels due east on Robert B. Lee Drive. It passes a U.S. Post Office and crosses over some railroad tracks of Norfolk Southern Railway and then enters a rural area of the city. The truck route passes Lee County Elementary School before intersecting Lovers Lane Road. At this intersection, it leaves the city limits of Leesburg and turns left to a due north direction. It continues to the north until it meets its eastern terminus, a second intersection with SR 32 east of Leesburg. Here, the roadway continues as Old Stage Road.

The entire route is in Lee County.

Location	mi	km	Destinations	Notes
Leesburg	0.0	0.0	US 19 / SR 3 / SR 32 (Walnut Street) / US 19 Byp. north / SR 3 Byp. north (Dawson Road)	Western terminus of SR 32 Truck; southern terminus of US 19 Byp./SR 3 Byp.
	2.6	4.2	SR 32 / Old Stage Road north	Eastern terminus of SR 32 Truck; southern terminus of Old Stage Road
1.000 mi = 1.609 km; 1.000 km = 0.621 mi

=== Sycamore connector route ===
State Route 32 Connector
- Location: Sycamore
- Length: 0.041 mi (66 m)
- Existed: 1967–present

State Route 32 Connector (SR 32 Conn.) is a 217-foot-long (66 m) connector route that exists entirely within the city limits of Sycamore, in the south-central part of Turner County.

It begins at an intersection with US 41/SR 7 (East Railroad Avenue). It travels in a northeasterly direction until it meets its eastern terminus, an intersection with the SR 32 mainline (Jefferson Davis Highway). Due to the format to the intersection of US 41/SR 7 and the SR 32 mainline, SR 32 Conn. is an easier way for drivers to travel from US 41/SR 7 north to SR 32 east and from SR 32 west to US 41/SR 7 south.

Between the beginning of 1950 and the beginning of 1968, SR 32 Conn. was established on its current path.

The entire route is in Sycamore, Turner County.

mi	km	Destinations	Notes
0.000	0.000	US 41 / SR 7 (East Railroad Avenue) – Tifton	Western terminus
0.041	0.066	SR 32 (Jefferson Davis Highway) – Irwinville	Eastern terminus
1.000 mi = 1.609 km; 1.000 km = 0.621 mi

=== Douglas truck route ===
State Route 32 Truck
- Location: Douglas
- Length: 5.2 mi (8.4 km)

State Route 32 Truck (SR 32 Truck) is a truck route around Douglas traveling south of mainline SR 32. It is named Bowen Mill Road Southwest, and Bowen Mill Road Southeast.

SR 32 Truck begins at an intersection with the SR 32 mainline (Ocilla Road/West Ward Street). This intersection is also the northern terminus of SR 158 Truck. SR 32 Truck/SR 158 Truck travel south-southwest, concurrent with US 221 Truck/US 441 Truck/SR 31 Truck/SR 135 Truck/SR 206. The seven highways cross over some railroad tracks of CSX on the Hero Bridge. Northwest of a Walmart distribution center, they curve to the south-southeast. They intersect SR 158 (Baker Highway) and then curve to the east-southeast. They intersect SR 135 (Willacoochee Road). Here, SR 135 Truck reaches its southern terminus. At an intersection with US 221/US 441/SR 31 (Peterson Avenue), US 221 Truck, US 441 Truck, SR 31 Truck, and SR 135 Truck reach their southern terminus, while SR 206 reaches its eastern terminus. Also US 221 joins the concurrency. The highways curve to the north-northeast and have another intersection with SR 158 (East Baker Highway). They cross over the CSX railroad tracks again before curving to the northwest. A short distance later, they have another intersection with SR 32 (Bowen Mill Road/Ward Street). Here, US 221, SR 32, SR 135, and SR 135 Truck continue to the northwest.

The entire route is in Douglas, Coffee County.

mi	km	Destinations	Notes
0.0	0.0	US 221 Truck north / US 441 Truck north / SR 31 Truck north / SR 135 Truck north / SR 158 Truck begins / SR 206 west (Bowen Mill Road) / SR 32 (Ocilla Road/West Ward Street) – Ocilla, Fitzgerald, Douglas, Coffee Regional Medical Center	Western end of US 221 Truck/US 441 Truck/SR 31 Truck/SR 135 Truck, SR 158 Truck, and SR 206 concurrencies; western terminus of SR 32 Truck; northern terminus of SR 158 Truck
0.3	0.48	Hero Bridge	Crossing over railroad tracks of CSX
1.1	1.8	SR 158 (Baker Highway) – Lax, Douglas, South Georgia State College, Wiregrass Georgia Tech	
2.2	3.5	SR 135 south (Willacoochee Road) / Wheeler Avenue north – Willacoochee	Western end of SR 135 concurrency
2.7	4.3	US 221 south / US 441 / SR 31 / SR 206 ends (Peterson Avenue) – Douglas, Pearson, South Georgia State College, Douglas Municipal Airport	Eastern end of US 221 Truck/US 441 Truck/SR 31 Truck/SR 135 Truck concurrency; western end of US 221 concurrency; southern terminus of US 221 Truck, US 441 Truck, SR 31 Truck, and SR 135 Truck; eastern terminus of SR 206
4.2	6.8	SR 158 (East Baker Highway) – Douglas, Waycross	
5.2	8.4	US 221 north / SR 32 / SR 135 north (SR 158 Truck east / Bowen Mill Road / Ward Street) – Hazlehurst, General Coffee State Park	Eastern end of US 221, SR 135, and SR 135 Truck concurrencies; eastern terminus of SR 32 Truck and SR 135 Truck
1.000 mi = 1.609 km; 1.000 km = 0.621 mi: Concurrency terminus

=== Patterson connector route ===
State Route 32 Connector
- Location: Patterson
- Existed: 1973–1978

State Route 32 Connector (SR 32 Conn.) was a short-lived connector route of SR 32 that existed entirely within the central part of the city limits of Patterson. Between the beginning of 1952 and the beginning of 1974, it was established from SR 32 northeast and northwest to US 82/SR 38. By the beginning of 1979, it was decommissioned.

The entire route was in Patterson, Pierce County.

mi	km	Destinations	Notes
		SR 32	Southern terminus
		US 82 / SR 38	Northern terminus
1.000 mi = 1.609 km; 1.000 km = 0.621 mi
