= U.S. Route 221 in Georgia =

Segment of American highway

U.S. Highway 221
- US 221 highlighted in red

Route information
- Maintained by GDOT
- Length: 261 mi (420 km)
- Existed: 1954–present

Major junctions
- South end: US 221 / SR 55 at the Florida state line southwest of Quitman
- US 84 / SR 333 in Quitman; I-75 / US 41 in Valdosta; US 82 / SR 520 in Pearson; US 23 / US 341 / SR 27 in Hazlehurst; I-16 near Norristown; US 80 / SR 26 near Norristown; US 1 / SR 4 / SR 17 from Louisville to Wrens; US 78 / US 278 / SR 10 in Harlem; I-20 near Appling; SR 47 / SR 104 / SR 150 in Pollards Corner
- North end: US 221 at the SC line near Clarks Hill

Location
- Country: United States
- State: Georgia
- Counties: Brooks, Lowndes, Lanier, Clinch, Atkinson, Coffee, Jeff Davis, Montgomery, Treutlen, Emanuel, Johnson, Jefferson, McDuffie, Columbia

Highway system
- United States Numbered Highway System; List; Special; Divided; Georgia State Highway System; Interstate; US; State; Special
← SR 220	→ SR 221

U.S. Route 221 (US 221) in the U.S. state of Georgia is a south–north U.S. Highway. It travels from the Florida border near the Quitman area to the South Carolina state line, north of Pollards Corner. The highway connects North Central Florida with Upstate South Carolina.

US 221 has concurrencies with Georgia State Route 76 (SR 76) from the Florida state line to Quitman, SR 333 within Quitman, SR 38 from Quitman to Valdosta, SR 7 in Valdosta, SR 31 from Valdosta to Douglas, SR 135 in Lakeland, SR 37 from Lakeland to east of Lakeland, SR 122 from Lakeland to northeast of Lakeland, SR 135 Byp. in Lakeland, SR 135 from Douglas to Uvalda, SR 32 Truck/SR 158 Truck and SR 32 in Douglas, SR 135 Conn. in Hazlehurst, SR 56 from Uvalda to Gillis Springs, SR 15 in Soperton, SR 171 from Gillis Springs to Louisville, SR 78 within the vicinity of Bartow, SR 24 within the vicinity of Louisville, SR 4 Bus. in Louisville, SR 4 and SR 17 from Louisville to Wrens, SR 88 and SR 540 in Wrens, SR 47 from Wrens to Pollards Corner, and SR 150 from Pollards Corner to the South Carolina state line.

Concurrencies of US 221 with U.S. Highways in Georgia include US 84 from Quitman to Valdosta, US 41 in Valdosta, US 129 in the vicinity of Lakeland, US 441 from south-southwest of Pearson to Douglas, part of US 23/US 341 in Hazlehurst, US 319 within the vicinity of Bartow, and US 1 from Louisville to Wrens.

== Route description ==
=== Florida through Hazlehurst ===
Starting at the Florida line south of Quitman in Brooks County, US 221 heads north concurrent with SR 76. Just south of Quitman, both roads merge with an at-grade interchange with SR 333 until they reach downtown Quitman, passing over a railroad bridge over a former Atlantic Coast Line Railroad line. US 221/SR 76/SR 333 turn east at US 84/SR 38 in front of the Brooks County Probate Courthouse and all five routes stay concurrent until the intersection with Washington Street where SR 76/333 split off to the north. Previously, SR 76 continued along US 84/US 221/SR 38 until Highland Road and split off to the northeast. Just before the bridge over the Okapilco Creek, the name of US 84/US 221/SR 38 changes from East Screven Street to Thomasville Road. The routes maintain this name even as they cross the bridge over the Withlacoochee River as well as the Brooks-Lowndes County Line. All the while, US 84/US 221/SR 38 runs in close proximity to the north side of the same former ACL line it passed over in Downtown Quitman.

East of there, the road runs along small portion of the border with Valdosta becoming West Hill Avenue then enters it completely just before encountering the quarter cloverleaf interchange with Interstate 75 at Exit 16, and from there also serves as the beginning of the Interstate 75 Business Loop. US 84/US 221/I-75 Bus./SR 83 makes a brief curve to the southeast before the intersection with the southern terminus of SR 133. After crossing over a railroad bridge and then intersecting North Wells Street, the routes become a one-way pair splitting between Hill Avenue (eastbound) and Central Avenue (westbound). Further downtown, US 84/US 221/SR 38 encounters another one-way pair at US 41 Business, the southbound road uses North Patterson Street, and the northbound road which is a block later is at North Ashley Street, which takes I-BL 75 with it. West Hill and West Central Avenues become East Hill and East Central Avenues east of Patterson Street. Central Avenue ends at Hill Avenue and Forrest Street making the routes bidirectional four-lane undivided highway with center-left turn provisions once again. After Blanchard Street, the road becomes a divided highway just before crossing a pair of bridges over Knights Creek, then passes by some radio towers for WJEM (1150 AM). The end of US 221's multiplex with US 84/SR 38 takes place at the intersection with US 41/SR 7/SR 31 (Inner Perimeter Road), and US 221 turns north along a new multiplex. After a curve to the northwest, the four routes intersect East Park Avenue. Here, US 221/SR 31 split off to the northeast and then leaves the city, while US 41/SR 7 heads northwest towards I-75 at Exit 22. East Park Avenue runs northeast becoming Lakeland Highway, and passes through spares residencies and occasional farm fields of little importance. The only site of any significance along this route is the Bemiss Auxiliary Army Airfield which is hidden off in a wooden area accessible only by a dirt road just south of the Lowndes-Lanier County Line.

The road starts curving more toward the north and somewhere off to the east is the beginning of SR 31 Connector. North of there, it enters the Lakeland City Limits just south of Burnt Church Road, becoming South Valdosta Road. After passing the city department of public works garage it is joined by a concurrency with SR 135. South Valdosta Road comes to an end, but US 221/SR 31/SR 135 turn right at a wrong-way concurrency with U.S. Route 129, which also has concurrencies with SR 11/SR 37/SR 122. Georgia State Route 135's wrong way concurrency with US 129 ends as soon as it begins, because it is positioned at a pair of T-intersections set close to one another that requires a slight shift to the right for all traffic on North Carter Street. At Oak Street, another concurrency joins US 221, specifically SR 135 Bypass then two blocks later turns north onto North College Street, which is also the southern terminus of SR 11 Bypass. US 129/US 221/SR 11/SR 31/SR 37/SR 122 leaves the city limits at the bridge over "Big Creek" which is a tributary of the Alapaha River. These routes cross that river itself using the Captain Henry Will Jones Bridge. A former section of the route can be found curving off to the northwest at the intersection with a dirt road named "Old River Road," and US 221/SR 31/SR 122 turns north just before US 129/SR 11's concurrency with SR 37 ends, almost in the same manner. Shortly after this, SR 122 breaks away from the multiplex, branching off to the east. The last intersection in Lanier County is a blinker-light intersection with SR 168. Immediately after this the road cuts through a corner of Clinch County surrounded by forestland and only intersecting local dirt roads until it enters Atkinson County and encounters the southern terminus of a concurrency with SR 64

South of Pearson, US 441 joins the concurrency with US 221/SR 31/SR 64 bringing the overlapping SR 89 to an end, however US 221 continues north along that multiplex until it reaches the town whereas SR 64 leaves at US 82. North of US 82 US 221/US 441/SR 31 becomes a four-lane undivided highway that runs northeast then after the bridge over Pudding Creek curves to the northwest along the left bank of the Satilla River, then turns straight north to finally cross that river. Six miles later the routes enter Douglas. Right after Douglas Municipal Airport US 221 leaves the US 441 multiplex, turning east at the intersection of Bowens Mill Road, which includes SR 135/SR 32 Truck/SR 158 Truck and the southern terminus of SR 206. A widening project is proposed for this segment. Just before reaching Brantley Boulevard the road starts to curve northeast. SR 158 Truck ends at SR 158, but US 221/SR 32 Truck/SR 135 continues northeast. At a grade crossing with the same former Seaboard Coast Line Railroad line it previously went over, the routes encounter and intersection with Spooner Road and Iron Road, and then curves to the northwest. Georgia State SR 32 Truck finally ends at the east end of a short multiplex between SR 32, which ends at Westgreen Road, where westbound SR 32 turns left but northbound US 221/SR 135 turns right, passing a bridge over Seventeen Mile River, thus leaving the city limits. Despite this, US 221/SR 135 remains a four-lane undivided highway with a continuous left-turn lane and keeps the name Westgreen Road a little longer. Between Charmingdale and Tyson Roads, the outer northbound lane ends. North of the eastern terminus of the Georgia State Route 206 Connector, the road changes into a two-lane highway with a continuous left-turn lane, and after Clough Boulevard, the center-left turn lane ends. North of there it has a wye intersection with Cross Road, and then passes by the former Beaver Kreek Golf Course The road makes a direct northeast curve, then turns back to the north before passing through West Green. The last rural community is Lehigh before US 221 curves to the north-northeast and crosses the Coffee-Jeff Davis County Line.

Remaining at the same trajectory, the first community US 221/SR 135 runs through in Jeff Davis County is the small City of Denton. North of Denton, the road becomes Douglas Highway, which briefly curves straight north and runs through Brooker where it meets the eastern terminus of SR 107. Immediately curving to the north-northeast and later the northeast, the road passes through Roper. The few non-agricultural sites along the way include a campus of the Coastal Pines Technical College. Between Camelia Road and Palm Road, US 221/SR 135 passes over a small causeway over man-made lake utilizing Big Satilla Creek. The largest city within the county that it enters is Hazlehurst just south of the intersection with West Pineland Avenue. Between the unfinished Edgewood Street and Belleview Court, it passes by the Jeff Davis Hospital. Northbound US 221/SR 135 makes a right turn onto East Jefferson Street shared by southbound US 23 Business as the beginning of another one-way pair. Just after the former west to northbound turning ramp, Northbound US 221 Truck continues down East Jefferson Street along with southbound US 23 BUS, while northbound US BUS 23 joins northbound US 221 along South Cromartie Street. Both Cromartie Street and Tallahassee Street have railroad crossings for a former Southern Railway line (now the Norfolk Southern Railway's Brunswick District), but Tallahassee Street's crossing is directly in front of the former station. The route intersects with northbound US 23/US 341 and the north end of US BUS 23, and the truck routes for US 221/GA 135 officially comes to an end. US 23/US 341 and northbound US 221 run for one block until the routes curve to the north at East Coffee (SR 19 Connector) and West Jamar Streets, and northbound US 221 finally re-joins the southbound road once again at North Tallahassee Street, while northbound US 23/US 341 continues towards Eastman, Perry, Barnesville, Macon, Atlanta and Dillard. Heading into more rural surroundings, US 221/SR 135 passes by Jeff Davis Country Club, and later becomes the Uvalda Highway, passing by Tallahassee off to the northwest. Curving towards the east-northeast, the road passes through the territory of the Beasley Forest Products lumber yard, which contains a railroad line that ends on the southeast side of the road at an abandoned railroad crossing. East of the lumber yard, the road curves back more towards the north-northeast. The last site along the road within the county is the Towns Bluff Park & Heritage Center, a county park within the Bullard Creek Wildlife Management Area. US 221/SR 135 crosses the Jeff Davis-Montgomery County Line at the foot of the Neal Lee Gillis Memorial Bridge, a long two-lane causeway over the Altamaha River.

=== North of Hazlehurst through Bartow ===
After the bridge, US 221/SR 135 only has intersections with a boat launching area and some minor dirt driveways until the blinker-light intersection with South Old River Road (Montgomery CR 150). Further north it passes through the eastern edge of Charlotteville. Entering Uvalda, the street name changes to First Street. As it approaches Main Street, the concurrency with SR 135 ends, and US 221 turns left at East Main Street to join another concurrency with SR 56. SR 135 continues north along First Street towards Petross and Higgston. At Beulah Street, East Main Street becomes West Main Street, and US 221/SR 56 curves to the north-northwest. Just after leaving the city limits, the routes are officially named the Edward C. Moses Memorial Highway, continuing to run northwest through rural Montgomery County. South of East Gillis Street, the road enters Mount Vernon and becomes South Mason Street. After running between a cemetery and an agricultural feed store, that street end at East Church Street becoming yet another one way pair around the Montgomery County Courthouse Square, with northbound US 221/SR 56 along McEachin Street and Broad Street, and southbound US 221/SR 56 along South Railroad Avenue and Church Street. Leaving the square at Railroad Avenue, the routes remain part of downtown Mount Vernon. Only when they intersect US 280/SR 30 (Spring Street) does US 221 become North Railroad Avenue. The road leaves the city limits along an embankment and culverts over Flat Creek, and after this is named the Gary P. Braddy Highway, and briefly has a second northbound lane. A dirt road named Hobson Wells Road branches off to the northeast, which while otherwise unimportant in that location, returns to US 221 across from the paved southern terminus of SR 199. Northeast of SR 199, it runs through the western edge of Tarrytown.

Somewhere north of the Montgomery-Treutlen County Line, a second northbound lane forms along the left side of the existing northbound lane. The inner northbound lane becomes the primary lane as the outer-northbound lane ends just before the intersection with Lawson Beck Road, only for a second southbound lane to form again north of Mount Olive Church Road until north of the intersection with Sessions Road. Within Soperton US 221/SR 56 gains the name Mount Vernon Road, but north of Fowler Street and South Third Street, it curves to the right to intersect and become South Second Street. Further in town, the routes have an intersection with SR 15/SR 29 (West and East Main Streets) just before a railroad crossing. SR 15 briefly joins US 221/SR 56 from East Main Street for two blocks before turning left onto West Louisiana Avenue, where that route joins another concurrency with SR 78. At Metter Road, US 221/SR 56 intersects SR 46, then the name changes from North Second Street to Swainsboro Highway. The routes curve to the east-northeast, and just as it leaves the city limits runs along the northern edge of Treutlen County Airport (SR 46 runs along the southern edge), which is across from a small cemetery. The road remains at relatively the same trajectory, until it intersects SR 86, then curves towards the north-northeast just before crossing I-16, at Exit 78. North of there is the rural community of Gillis Springs where SR 56 turns east to leave the concurrency with US 221 and a new concurrency along SR 171 begins.

The intersection with Norristown Road is where US 221/SR 171 crosses the Treutlen-Emanuel County Line, then it crosses a bridge over the Ohoopee River as it enters Norristown. Here the closest resemblance to a major intersection is Keas Old Mill Pond Road and Norristown Covena Road. North of Norristown, the road curves to the north-northeast and remains within that trajectory, even as it passes through the blinker-light intersection with U.S. Route 80. North of US 80, US 221/SR 171 makes an almost immediate northwest curve at a fork in the road with Cow Ford Bridge Road, and doesn't curve back to the northeast again until after the intersection with Foskey Road. The road quickly enters and leaves the Emanuel-Johnson County Line, and has one last intersection in Emanuel County, specifically with WES Lawson Road, only to re-enter Johnson County again. Throughout most of the county, the road is named Montgomery Street. Briefly, it almost seems like it is going to run straight north, but then curves to the north-northwest. The first and only major community it enters within the county is Kite where it has a blinker-light intersection with SR 57. Beyond SR 57 it remains in a relative northwest trajectory, until it makes a sudden curve to the right near the intersection of Gumlog Road to cross a bridge over the Little Ohoopee River, and then curves back to the left again after the intersection with Swain Creek Road.

Further north it curves to the east-northeast where it crosses the Johnson-Jefferson County Line southwest of the intersection with Coleman Chapel Road (Jefferson CR 334). The road that was previously named Montgomery Street in Johnson County, curves back to the north-northeast and is about to terminate, when US 221/SR 171 is joined by a concurrency with US 319/SR 78. From there, US 221/US 319/SR 78/SR 171 continue to the northeast until they approach Braddy Road where it turns straight north until the intersection with Tarver Grove Church Road. At the eastern terminus of SR 242 US 221/US 319 officially enters Bartow, the crosses a bridge over the Williamson Swamp Creek. Immediately after crossing a railroad line and curving to the right, US 221/SR 171 makes a left turn onto Church Street, officially leaving the concurrency with US 319/SR 78, as US 319 heads to Wadley, and SR 78 heads toward Midville.

=== Bartow to South Carolina ===
Continuing along Church Street north of Bartow, US 221/SR 171 stays relatively north as it curves back and forth through western Jefferson County, passing through a few agricultural areas, and residential zones, as well as the occasional church, but mainly forestland with some wetlands hidden in the trees. The one exception to this is a dip in the road approaching a culvert over a small river leading to Cobb Lake. Near Almira the road seems as if it is about to end at a west to east road surrounded by more farmland, but instead turns right and joins a concurrency with SR 24. From that point on, US 221/SR 24/SR 171 curves to the east-northeast as they approach a bridge over the Ogeechee River, and the forested marshland that surround the river. The concurrency with SR 171 finally ends at Grange Road, which runs northwest, but US 221/SR 24 crosses another bridge over a tributary to the Ogeechee River before entering Louisville. At West Broad Street, US Business Route 1/SR BUS 4 joins the routes from the south, and the concurrency with SR 24 ends as it briefly turns south onto Ninth Street. US BUS 1/US 221/SR 4 Bus. curves to the north in front of City Hall, then later joins up with and at-grade interchange with US 1 and SR 4/SR 17 as the business routes for each come to an end. From that interchange on, US 1/US 221/SR 4/SR 17 is a two lane highway with continuous left-turn lane provisions that end at the driveway to the Jefferson County Landfill. That center turn lane is replaced by a brief second northbound lane. Long after that second northbound lane replaces the first one, the routes encounter the southern terminus of SR 296, then passes along the eastern edge of Jefferson County High School (SR 296 runs west of the western edge of the school). Running through Wrens, the proposed I-14 is supposed to run through and have an interchange with US 1/US 221, but for now the segment of that proposed interstate serves as the southern end of the SR 88 multiplex. Northeast of there, US 1/US 221/SR 4/SR 88 loses the concurrency with SR 17 at Thompson Street, and SR 88 leaves the concurrency at SR 80 as it briefly joins that route in another concurrency. Just after US 1/SR 4 widens to a four-lane undivided highway, US 221 splits off to the northwest cosigned with SR 47 and passes the Wrens Memorial Airport. Later US 221/SR 47 starts to curve more toward the northeast rather than the northwest.

Briefly entering McDuffie County at the bridge over Brier Creek the road encounters only local intersections, and momentarily turns east until it turns northeast again as it passes through Avondale, then later enters Columbia County at a culvert over Boggy Gut Creek, gaining the name Harlem-Wrens Road as well as the additional name of Jake Pollard Highway. Through the Harlem City Line the name changes to South Louisville Street, but still holds onto the dual name of Jake Pollard Highway even as it intersects US 78/US 278/SR 10. North of there, the road becomes North Louisville Street and passes by Columbia Theatre, then a Georgia Railroad and Banking Company railroad crossing between South Hicks Street and North Hicks Street, and later the Laurel and Hardy Museum. After leaving Harlem, the street name changes from North Louisville Street to the Harlem-Appling Highway. Few sites exist along this segment, including intersections, all of which are paved whether significant or otherwise. Among them is a shared intersection with Fairview Drive and Old Union Road. On the northwest corner of the intersection with Clary Cut Road, it passes a water tower and then Harlem High School. North of a former section of Harlem-Appling Highway it encounters a traffic circle with SR 223. From there it runs through more Georgia Pine Forest until it approaches a traffic circle interchange with I-20 (Georgia State Route 402) at Exit 183, just east of a pair of rest areas, and about 20 miles west of Augusta. Another former segment is encountered after this, in this case it is named Lonegran Hulme Road. The next major intersection is the western terminus of SR 232 south of Appling. Within Appling itself, US 221/SR 47 branches off to the northeast at Ray Owens Road which continues straight, and then replaces the trajectory of White Oak Road to become Scotts Ferry Road. Aside from crossing a bridge over a Greenbrier Creek between Tubman Road and Yelton Road, and an extra northbound lane within the vicinity of a church, there isn't much in the way of notable features about the road.

Shortly before crossing into South Carolina, SR 150 joins up at the Pollards Corner intersection as SR 47 turns away. This specific intersection is a blinker-light intersection that also includes the western terminus of SR 104, and US 221 along Scotts Ferry Road. Scotts Ferry Road turns more toward the northeast later becoming Clark's Hill Road, and yet still continues with the dual name of Jake Pollard Highway. Beginning at the Spring Grove Missionary Baptist Church, the road curves from northeast to southeast. On the north side of this segment, a private road leading from an unfinished intersection is a driveway to the Augusta Sailing Club. Curving back to the east-northeast, he last two sites in Georgia are the West Dam Recreation Area and the driveway to the "Below Dam Georgia Boat Ramp" before the passage into South Carolina occurs on top of the J. Strom Thurmond Dam which forms the southern shore of Lake Strom Thurmond.

== Major intersections ==
County	Location	mi	km	Exit	Destinations	Notes
Brooks		0.0	0.0		US 221 south (SR 55) – Greenville, Perry	Continuation from Florida; southern terminus of SR 76; southern end of SR 76 concurrency
Brooks	Quitman	10.1	16.3		SR 333 south – Madison	West end of SR 333 overlap
Brooks	Quitman	10.9	17.5		US 84 west / SR 38 west (West Screven Street) – Thomasville, Cairo	South end of US 84 / SR 38 overlap
Brooks	Quitman	11.1	17.9		SR 76 north / SR 333 north (North Washington Avenue) to SR 133 – Morven, Adel, Moultrie	east end of SR 76 / SR 333 overlap
Brooks	Quitman	11.4	18.3		North Highland Street	Former east end of SR 76 overlap
Withlacoochee River		17.3	27.8	Bridge		
Lowndes	Valdosta	25.8	41.5		I-75 (SR 401) / I-75 BL begins – Macon, Lake City, Lake Park, Moody AFB	I-75 exit 16; southern terminus of I-75 BL; southern end of I-75 BL concurrency
Lowndes	Valdosta	26.6	42.8		SR 133 north (St. Augustine Road) – Moultrie, Airport	
Lowndes	Valdosta	28.2	45.4		US 41 Bus. south / SR 7 Bus. south (Patterson Street south) – Airport	Northern end of I-75 BL concurrency (southbound lanes only)
Lowndes	Valdosta	28.3	45.5		I-75 BL north / US 41 Bus. north / SR 7 Bus. north (North Ashley Street north)	Northern end of I-75 BL concurrency (northbound lanes only)
Lowndes	Valdosta	31.4	50.5		US 41 south / US 84 east / SR 7 south / SR 31 south / SR 38 east (Inner Perimeter Road) – Lakeland, Moody AFB	east end of US 84 / SR 38 concurrency; south end of US 41/SR 7/SR 31 concurrency
Lowndes	Valdosta	33.3	53.6		US 41 north / SR 7 north (Inner Perimeter Road) to I-75	Northern end of US 41 / SR 7 concurrency
Lanier		47.7	76.8		SR 31 Conn. east (Murray Boulevard)	Western terminus of SR 31 Connector
Lanier	Lakeland	48.4	77.9		SR 135 south (South Mills Street) – Naylor	Southern end of SR 135 concurrency
Lanier	Lakeland	49.0	78.9		US 129 north / SR 11 north / SR 37 west / SR 122 west (West Main Street) – Ray City, Nashville, Adel, Moultrie, Banks Lake National Wildlife Refuge	Southern end of US 129 / SR 11 / SR 37 / SR 122 concurrencies
Lanier	Lakeland	49.0	78.9		SR 135 north (North Carter Street) – Willacoochee	Northern end of SR 135 concurrency
Lanier	Lakeland	49.2	79.2		SR 135 Byp. south (South Oak Street)	Southern end of SR 135 Bypass concurrency
Lanier	Lakeland	49.3	79.3		SR 11 Byp. north / SR 135 Byp. north (North College Street)	Northern end of SR 135 Bypass concurrency; southern terminus of SR 11 Bypass
Lanier		50.3	81.0	Captain Henry Will Jones Bridge over the Alapaha River		
Lanier		51.6	83.0		US 129 south / SR 11 south / SR 37 east – Homerville, Stockton, Statenville	Northern end of US 129 / SR 11 / SR 37 concurrency
Lanier		52.6	84.7		SR 122 east – Cogdell, Waycross	Northern end of SR 122 concurrency
Lanier		59.0	95.0		SR 168 – Nashville, Homerville	
Clinch	No major junctions					
Atkinson		64.4	103.6		SR 64 west – Ray City	Southern end of SR 64 concurrency
Atkinson		70.3	113.1		US 441 south / SR 89 south – Homerville	Northern terminus of SR 89; southern end of US 441 concurrency
Atkinson	Pearson	72.2	116.2		US 82 / SR 64 east / SR 520 (Albany Avenue) – Tifton, Waycross	Northern end of SR 64 concurrency
Coffee	Douglas	85.5	137.6		US 441 north / SR 31 north / SR 206 west / SR 135 south / SR 32 Truck (Bowen Mill Road) / SR 158 Truck – Willacoochee, Fitzgerald, Hazlehurst, General Coffee State Park	Northern end of US 441 concurrency; southern end of SR 135 concurrecy; eastern terminus of SR 206
Coffee	Douglas	87.0	140.0		SR 158 (East Baker Highway) – Douglas, Waycross	east end of SR 158 Truck overlap
Coffee	Douglas	88.0	141.6		SR 32 east (Ward Street) – Alma, General Coffee State Park	north end of SR 32 Truck overlap; south end of SR 32 overlap
Coffee	Douglas	88.1	141.8		SR 32 west (Hazlehurst Highway) – Douglas	north end of SR 32 overlap
Coffee		90.5	145.6		SR 206 Conn. west (North Connector Road) – truck route to US 441 / SR 31 / SR 32 west / SR 158 west	Eastern terminus of SR 206 Conn
Jeff Davis	Brooker	108.5	174.6		SR 107 west (McRae Highway) – Snipesville	Eastern terminus of SR 107
Jeff Davis	Hazlehurst	117.1	188.5		SR 135 Conn. south / US 221 Truck north / SR 135 Truck north (Jefferson Street) to US 23 south / SR 19 south – Alma	Former eastern terminus of SR 268
Jeff Davis	Hazlehurst	118.0	189.9		US 23 south / US 341 south / SR 19 south / SR 27 south (Jarman Street) – Baxley	south end of US 23 / US 341 / SR 19 / SR 27 overlap (northbound only)
Jeff Davis	Hazlehurst	118.0	189.9		SR 19 Conn. (Tallahassee Street) – Douglas	connects the two directions of US 221 / SR 135
Jeff Davis	Hazlehurst	118.2	190.2		US 23 north / US 341 north / SR 19 north / SR 27 north (Coffee Street) – McRae	north end of US 23 / US 341 / SR 19 / SR 27 overlap (northbound only)
Altamaha River		126.1	202.9	Neil Lee Gillis Memorial Bridge		
Montgomery	Uvalda	131.6	211.8		SR 56 south (1st Street/Main Street) / SR 135 (1st Street) – Hazlehurst, Vidalia	Northern end of S 135 overlap; Southern end of SR 56 concurrency
Montgomery	Mount Vernon	143.1	230.3		US 280 / SR 30 (Spring Street) – McRae, Vidalia	
Montgomery		148.3	238.7		SR 199 north – East Dublin	Southern terminus of SR 199
Treutlen	Soperton	157.3	253.1		SR 15 / SR 29 south (Main Street)	Southern end of SR 15 concurrency
Treutlen	Soperton	157.4	253.3		SR 15 / SR 78 north (Louisiana Avenue)	Northern end of SR 15 concurrency
Treutlen	Soperton	157.8	254.0		SR 46 (Metter Road) – Eastman, Oak Park	
Treutlen		160.9	258.9		SR 227 south	Northern terminus of SR 227
Treutlen		163.6	263.3		SR 86 – East Dublin, Oak Park	
Treutlen		164.1	264.1		I-16 (Jim Gillis Historic Savannah Parkway) – Macon, Savannah	I-16, exit 78
Treutlen	Gillis Springs	165.9	267.0		SR 56 north / SR 171 north – Swainsboro	Northern end of SR 56 concurrency; southern terminus of SR 171
Emanuel		168.7	271.5	Ohoopee River		
Emanuel		172.7	277.9		US 80 / SR 26	
Johnson	No major junctions					
Emanuel	No major junctions					
Johnson	Kite	183.0	294.5		SR 57 (Kite Road) – Wrightsville, Swainsboro	
Jefferson		185.9	299.2	Little Ohoopee River		
Jefferson		193.3	311.1		US 319 south / SR 78 west	Southern end of US 319/SR 78 concurrency
Jefferson		196.5	316.2		SR 242 west (Minor Drive) – Sandersville	Eastern terminus of SR 242
Jefferson	Bartow	196.9	316.9		US 319 north / SR 78 east (Wadley Road)	Northern end of US 319/SR 78 concurrency
Jefferson		203.9	328.1		SR 24 west – Sandersville	Southern end of SR 24 concurrency
Jefferson		205.5	330.7	Ogeechee River		
Jefferson		206.7	332.7		SR 171 north (Grange Road) – Gibson	Northern end of SR 171 concurrency
Jefferson	Louisville	207.5	333.9		US 1 Bus. / SR 4 Bus. south (West Broad Street)	Southern terminus of US 1 Bus/SR 4 Bus concurrency
Jefferson	Louisville	207.9	334.6		SR 24 east (West Ninth Street)	Eastern end of SR 24 concurrency
Jefferson	Louisville	208.6	335.7		US 1 / SR 4 / SR 17 south (Jefferson Davis Highway); US 1 Bus. / SR 4 Bus. north end (Peachtree Street)	Northern terminus of US 1 Bus/SR 4 Bus; southern terminus of concurrency with US 1/SR 4/SR 17
Jefferson		212.3	341.7		SR 296 north – Stapleton	
Jefferson	Wrens	221.3	356.1		SR 88 west (Fenns Bridge Road) / SR 540 west (Fall Line Freeway) – Orange	Southern end of SR 88 and SR 540 concurrencies
Jefferson	Wrens	222.5	358.1		SR 17 north (Thompson Highway) / Howard Street east – Thomson	Northern end of SR 17 concurrency; western terminus of Howard Street
Jefferson	Wrens	222.8	358.6		SR 80 / SR 88 to SR 17 / SR 102 (Stapleton Highway) – Warrenton, Waynesboro, Matthews, Keysville, Blythe, Avera, Thomson	Northern end of SR 88 concurrency
Jefferson	Wrens	223.8	360.2		US 1 north / SR 4 north (North Main Street) / SR 47 begins / SR 540 east (Fall Line Freeway) – Augusta	Northern end of US 1/SR 4 and SR 540 concurrencies; southern terminus of SR 47
McDuffie	No major junctions					
Columbia	Harlem	239.1	384.8		US 78 / US 278 / SR 10 (Milledgeville Road)	
Columbia		243.8	392.4		SR 223 (Wrightsboro Road) – Thomson, Grovetown	Traffic circle
Columbia		244.9	394.1		I-20 (Carl Sanders Highway) – Atlanta, Augusta	Traffic circle interchange; I-20 exit 183
Columbia		247.4	398.2		SR 232 east (Columbia Road) – Martinez	Western terminus of SR 232
Columbia	Pollards Corner	254.4	409.4		SR 47 west / SR 104 east (Washington Road) / SR 150 west (Cobbham Road) – Lincolnton, Augusta, Thomson	Western end of SR 150 concurrency; western end of SR 47 concurrency; western terminus of SR 104
Savannah River		260.0	418.4	Clarks Hill Dam		
Savannah River		260.0	418.4		US 221 north – Clarks Hill	Continuation into South Carolina; eastern terminus of SR 150; eastern end of SR 150 concurrency
1.000 mi = 1.609 km; 1.000 km = 0.621 mi: Concurrency terminus; Incomplete access

== See also ==
- Special routes of U.S. Route 221

U.S. Route 221
Previous state: Florida	Georgia	Next state: South Carolina
