= Anguilla (disambiguation) =

Anguilla is a British overseas territory in the Caribbean.

Anguilla may also refer to:

- Anguilla, Georgia
- Anguilla, Mississippi
- Anguilla, United States Virgin Islands
- HMS Anguilla (K500), a British Royal Navy frigate in commission from 1943 to 1946
- Anguilla Cays, a group of islands on Cay Sal Bank in the Bahamas
- Anguilla, the only genus in the eel family Anguillidae
