= National Register of Historic Places listings in Montgomery County, Georgia =

This is a list of properties and districts in Montgomery County, Georgia that are listed on the National Register of Historic Places (NRHP).

This National Park Service list is complete through NPS recent listings posted March 14, 2025.

== Current listings ==
	Name on the Register	Image	Date listed	Location	City or town	Description
1	Willie T. McArthur Farm	Willie T. McArthur Farm	July 3, 2012 (#12000382)	165 McArthur Rd. 32°12′02″N 82°30′23″W	Ailey	Built in 1893 Georgia Historical Society^{[usurped]} Summary of nomination^{[usurped]}
2	Montgomery County Courthouse	Montgomery County Courthouse	September 18, 1980 (#80001122)	Courthouse Sq. 32°10′27″N 82°35′42″W	Mount Vernon	
