= Twenty Mile Creek =

Twenty Mile Creek or Twentymile Creek may refer to:

- Twenty Mile Creek (Georgia), a stream in Georgia
- Twentymile Creek (Lake Erie tributary), a stream in New York and Pennsylvania
- Twenty Mile Creek (Ontario), a stream in Canada
