= Georgia State Route 206 =

State highway in Georgia, United States

State Route 206
- Georgia State Route 206 highlighted in red

Route information
- Maintained by GDOT
- Length: 27.8 mi (44.7 km)

Major junctions
- South end: US 221 / US 441 / SR 31 / SR 135 in Douglas
- North end: US 319 / SR 107 east of Fitzgerald

Location
- Country: United States
- State: Georgia
- Counties: Coffee, Irwin, Ben Hill

Highway system
- Georgia State Highway System; Interstate; US; State; Special
← SR 205	→ SR 207

State Route 206 (SR 206) is a state highway in the southeastern part of U.S. state of Georgia. It runs southeast–northwest through portions of Ben Hill, Irwin, and Coffee counties. The route's southern terminus is in Douglas, and its northern terminus is just east of Fitzgerald.

== Route description ==
SR 206 begins at an intersection with US 221/US 441/SR 31/SR 135 in Douglas. It is part of a bypass around town. SR 135 and SR 206 run concurrent from SR 206's eastern terminus to a point approximately 0.5 miles (0.80 km) farther to the west. At this intersection, SR 135 turns to the southwest on Willacoochee Highway, and SR 335 begins a concurrency to the northwest. Just before leaving town is an intersection with SR 32. Northwest of Douglas is SR 206 Connector. The highway continues to the northwest until it reaches its northern terminus, an intersection with US 319/SR 107 east of Fitzgerald.

SR 206 is not part of the National Highway System, a system of routes determined to be the most important for the nation's economy, mobility and defense.

== Major intersections ==
County	Location	mi	km	Destinations	Notes
Coffee	Douglas	0.0	0.0	US 221 / US 441 / SR 31 / SR 135 north	Southern terminus; southern end of SR 135 concurrency
Coffee	Douglas	0.5	0.80	SR 135 south (Willacoochee Highway) / SR 353 north – Willacoochee	Northern end of SR 135 concurrency; southern end of SR 353 concurrency
Coffee	Douglas	1.6	2.6	SR 158 (West Baker Highway)	
Coffee	Douglas	2.7	4.3	SR 32 (Ocilla Road/West Ward Street) / SR 353 – Ocilla	Northern end of SR 353 concurrency
Coffee		4.8	7.7	SR 206 Conn. east (Industrial Road)	Western terminus of SR 206 Connector
Coffee		11.1	17.9	SR 268 – Ambrose, Broxton	
Irwin	No major junctions				
Ben Hill		27.8	44.7	US 319 / SR 107 (Jacksonville Highway)	Northern terminus
1.000 mi = 1.609 km; 1.000 km = 0.621 mi: Concurrency terminus

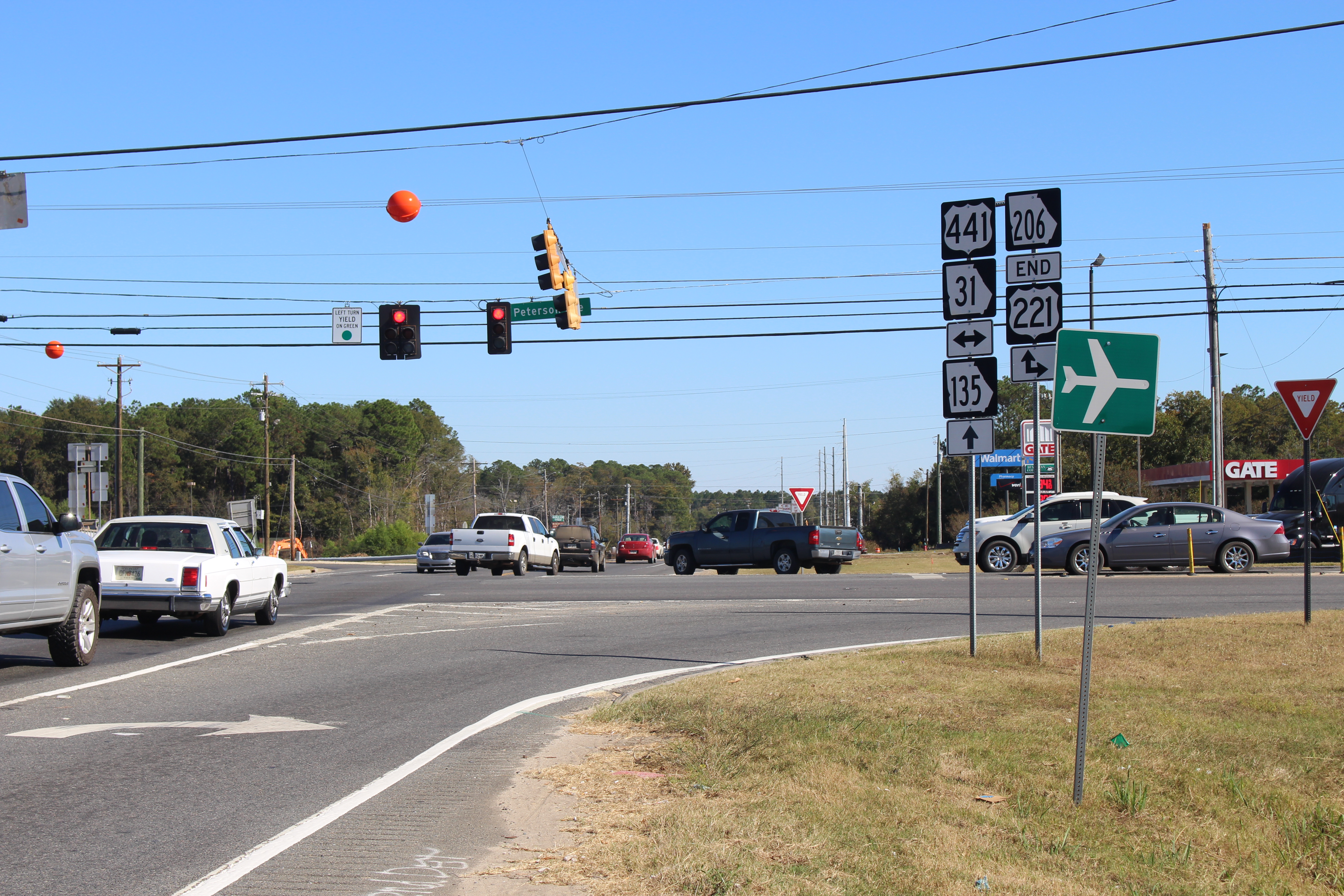
Eastern terminus of SR 206 in Douglas

== Related route ==
State Route 206 Connector
- Location: North of Douglas
- Length: 4.5 mi (7.2 km)

State Route 206 Connector (SR 206 Connector) exists entirely within the southeastern part of Coffee County. It is located north of Douglas as a connector between the SR 206 northwest of Douglas and US 221/SR 135 northeast of town. It is a nearly west–east route.

SR 206 is not part of the National Highway System, a system of routes determined to be the most important for the nation's economy, mobility and defense.

The entire route is in Coffee County.

Location	mi	km	Destinations	Notes
	0.0	0.0	SR 206 (Bowens Mill Road) – Douglas, Fitzgerald	Western terminus
	2.0	3.2	US 441 / SR 31 (Douglas Broxton Highway)	
	4.5	7.2	US 221 / SR 135 – Douglas, Hazlehurst	Eastern terminus
1.000 mi = 1.609 km; 1.000 km = 0.621 mi
