= Georgia State Route 268 =

State highway in Georgia

State Route 268
- SR 268 highlighted in red

Route information
- Maintained by GDOT
- Length: 22.9 mi (36.9 km)
- Existed: 1950–present

Major junctions
- West end: SR 32 southeast of Ambrose
- SR 206 southwest of Broxton; US 441 / SR 31 in Broxton
- East end: SR 107 in Snipesville

Location
- Country: United States
- State: Georgia
- Counties: Coffee, Jeff Davis

Highway system
- Georgia State Highway System; Interstate; US; State; Special
← SR 266	→ SR 270

State Route 268 (SR 268) is a 22.9-mile-long (36.9 km) southwest–northeast state highway located in the south-central part of the U.S. state of Georgia. It travels within portions of Coffee and Jeff Davis counties.

== Route description ==
No section of SR 268 that is included as a part of the National Highway System.

SR 268 begins at an intersection with SR 32 southeast of Ambrose. The route heads north-northeast and curves to the northeast to enter Ambrose. There, it crosses a Seaboard Coast Line railroad. It heads northeast, crosses the Seventeen Mile River, and intersects SR 206 (Bowens Mill Road). Farther to the northeast is Broxton, where it has a brief concurrency with US 441/SR 31 along Alabama Street. Northeast of Broxton, the route enters Jeff Davis County, and meets its eastern terminus, an intersection with SR 107 in Snipesville.

== History ==
SR 268 was established in 1950, and the part from SR 32 to Ambrose was paved. In 1957, a section from Broxton just to the northeast was paved. By 1960, the road was paved from its western terminus to just northeast of the Coffee-Jeff Davis County line. Also, the road was extended to Hazlehurst. By 1988, the road's eastern terminus was truncated to Snipesville, where it is today.

== Major intersections ==
County	Location	mi	km	Destinations	Notes
Coffee		0.0	0.0	SR 32 – Ocilla, Douglas	Southern terminus
Coffee	Seventeen Mile River	3.2	5.1	Crossing	
Coffee		5.8	9.3	SR 206 (Bowens Mill Road) – Fitzgerald, Douglas	
Coffee	Broxton	9.6	15.4	US 441 north / SR 31 north (Alabama Street) – Jacksonville	Southern end of US 441/SR 31 concurrency
Coffee	Broxton	10.0	16.1	US 441 south / SR 31 south (Alabama Street) – Douglas	Northern end of US 441/SR 31 concurrency
Jeff Davis	Snipesville	22.9	36.9	SR 107 (McRae Highway)	Northern terminus
1.000 mi = 1.609 km; 1.000 km = 0.621 mi: Concurrency terminus
