= Wray, Georgia =

- Unincorporated community
- Location within Georgia Location within the United States
- Coordinates: 31°37′21″N 83°03′18″W
- Country: United States
- State: Georgia
- County: Irwin
- Elevation: 308 ft (94 m)
- Time zone: UTC-5 (Eastern (EST))
  - Summer (DST): UTC-4 (EDT)
- ZIP code: 31798
- Area code: 229
- GNIS feature ID: 325567

Wray is an unincorporated community in Irwin County, Georgia, United States. The community is located near the county's eastern border, 3.1 miles (5.0 km) northwest of Ambrose. Wray has a post office with ZIP code 31798.
