= Georgia State Route 313 =

Highway in Georgia, United States

State Route 313
- SR 313 highlighted in red

Route information
- Maintained by GDOT
- Length: 22.3 mi (35.9 km)

Major junctions
- South end: US 82 / SR 520 in Sylvester
- SR 32 in Doles
- North end: SR 300 in Warwick

Location
- Country: United States
- State: Georgia
- Counties: Worth

Highway system
- Georgia State Highway System; Interstate; US; State; Special
| ← SR 312 | → SR 314 |

State Route 313 (SR 313) is a north-south state highway located entirely in Worth County in the southwestern part of the U.S. state of Georgia.

== Route description ==
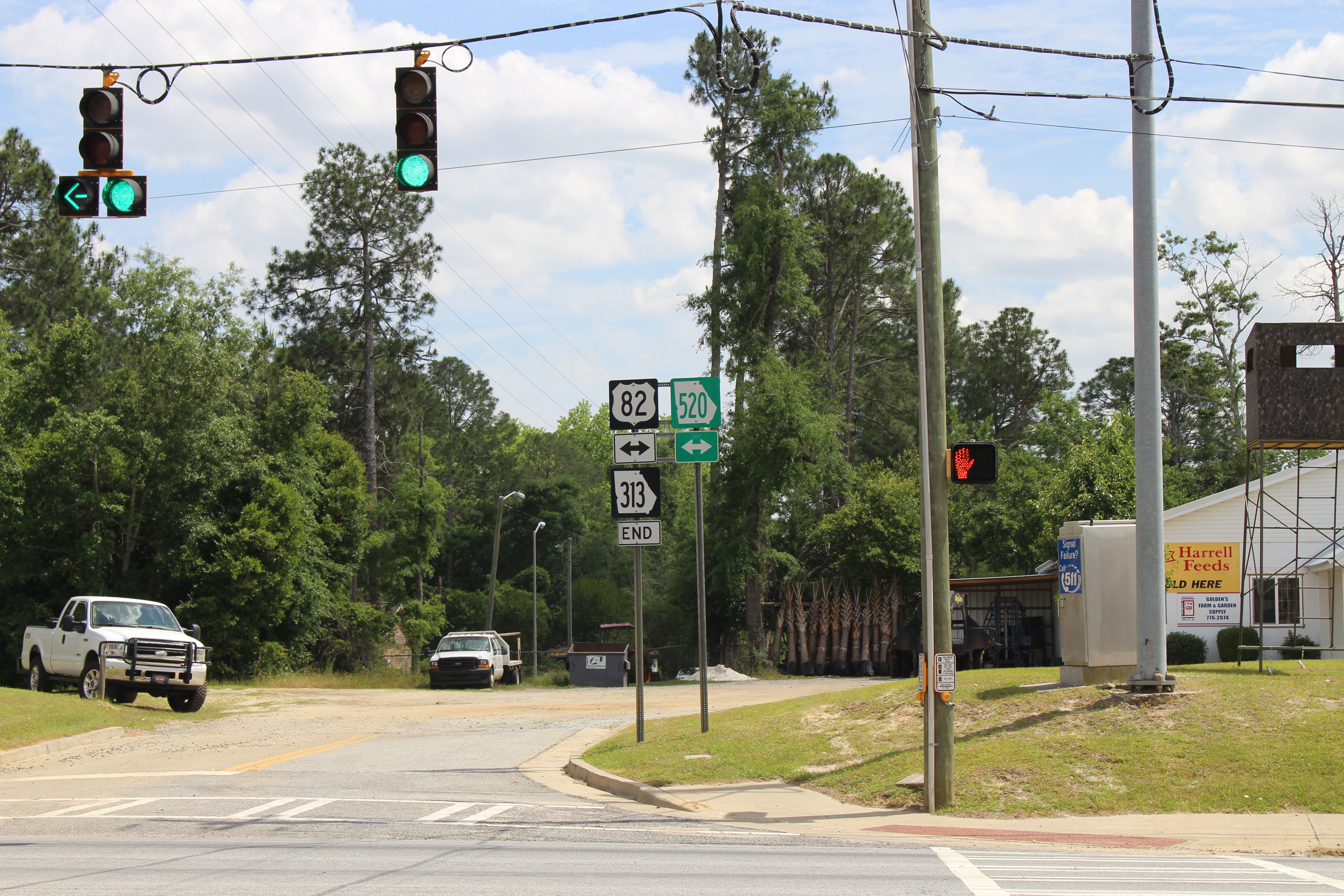
Southern terminus

SR 313 begins at an intersection with US 82/SR 520 in Sylvester. The route heads north-northwest through rural parts of the county, and along the way, passes through the unincorporated community of Isabella. After Isballa, SR 313 continues heading north-northwest until it meets SR 32 in the unincorporated community of Doles. The highway continues north-northwest, and curves to the northwest just before meeting its northern terminus, an intersection with SR 300 in Warwick.

== Major intersections ==
The entire route is in Worth County.

| Location | mi | km | Destinations | Notes |
|---|---|---|---|---|
| Sylvester | 0.0 | 0.0 | US 82 / SR 520 (East Franklin Street) | Southern terminus |
| Doles | 12.5 | 20.1 | SR 32 – Leesburg, Ashburn | |
| Warwick | 22.3 | 35.9 | SR 300 (Georgia-Florida Parkway) – Albany, Cordele | |
1.000 mi = 1.609 km; 1.000 km = 0.621 mi
