= Georgia State Route 107 =

State highway in Georgia, United States

State Route 107
- SR 107 highlighted in red

Route information
- Maintained by GDOT
- Length: 61.8 mi (99.5 km)

Major junctions
- West end: I-75 / SR 112 in Ashburn
- US 129 / SR 11 / SR 90 / SR 135 in Fitzgerald; SR 206 east of Fitzgerald; SR 182 northeast of Fitzgerald; US 441 / SR 31 from south of Jacksonville to west of Snipesville
- East end: US 221 / SR 135 in Brooker

Location
- Country: United States
- State: Georgia
- Counties: Turner, Irwin, Ben Hill, Coffee, Jeff Davis

Highway system
- Georgia State Highway System; Interstate; US; State; Special
| ← SR 106 | → SR 108 |

Georgia State Route 107 (SR 107) is a 61.8-mile-long (99.5 km) state highway that exists in the southern part of the U.S. state of Georgia. It travels from Interstate 75 (I-75) in Ashburn to U.S. Route 221 (US 221) in rural Jeff Davis County.

== Route description ==
SR 107 begins at an interchange with Interstate 75 (I-75) in Ashburn. It then travels to the east toward Fitzgerald, concurrent with SR 112 for approximately 3 miles (4.8 km) before departing. The highway then goes through rural Turner and Irwin counties before an intersection with SR 125 just west of Fitzgerald. Once in Fitzgerald, SR 107 has an intersection with U.S. Route 129 (US 129) and US 319. It shares a concurrency with US 319 as the highway leaves Fitzgerald and goes through rural Ben Hill County. The highway has intersections with SR 206 and SR 182 before entering Coffee County. Soon after entering Coffee County, the highway intersects US 441 and leaves its concurrency with US 319. SR 107 shares a brief concurrency with US 441 before turning east into rural Coffee and Jeff Davis counties. SR 107 has an intersection with SR 268 in Snipesville before reaching its eastern terminus with US 221 north of Denton.

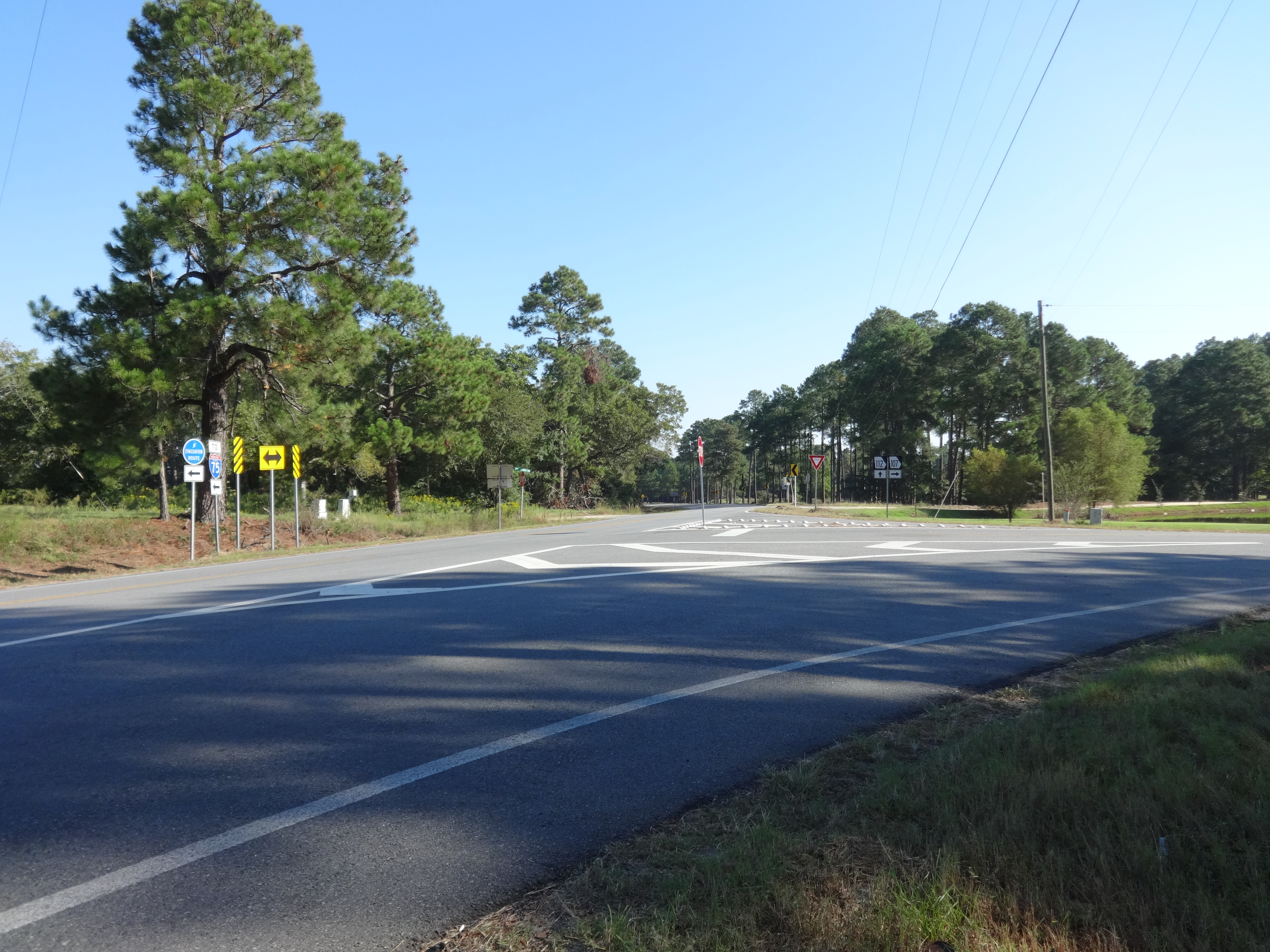
West end of SR 112 concurrency in Turner County.

== Major intersections ==
| County | Location | mi | km | Destinations | Notes |
|---|---|---|---|---|---|
| Turner | Ashburn | 0 | 0.0 | I-75 (SR 401) / SR 112 west | Western terminus; western end of SR 112 concurrency |
| Turner | | 3.3 | 5.3 | SR 112 east | Eastern end of SR 112 concurrency |
| Irwin | No major junctions | | | | |
| Ben Hill | Fitzgerald | 20.8 | 33.5 | SR 125 south | Northern terminus of SR 125 |
| Ben Hill | Fitzgerald | 24.3 | 39.1 | US 129 / US 319 south / SR 90 | Western end of US 319 concurrency |
| Ben Hill | | 28.6 | 46.0 | SR 206 east | Western terminus of SR 206 |
| Ben Hill | | 36.7 | 59.1 | SR 182 west | Eastern terminus of SR 182 |
| Coffee | | 43.8 | 70.5 | US 319 north / US 441 north / SR 31 north | Eastern end of US 319 concurrency; western end of US 441/SR 31 concurrency |
| Coffee | | 45.2 | 72.7 | US 441 south / SR 31 south | Western end of US 441/SR 31 concurrency |
| Jeff Davis | Snipesville | 58.1 | 93.5 | SR 268 | |
| Jeff Davis | Brooker | 61.8 | 99.5 | US 221 / SR 135 | Eastern terminus |
1.000 mi = 1.609 km; 1.000 km = 0.621 mi: Concurrency terminus
