= Georgia State Route 158 =

State highway in Georgia, United States

State Route 158
- Georgia State Route 158 highlighted in red

Route information
- Maintained by GDOT
- Length: 50.5 mi (81.3 km)

Major junctions
- West end: US 129 / SR 11 north of Alapaha
- US 221 / US 441 / SR 31 / SR 135 in Douglas
- East end: US 82 / SR 520 northwest of Waycross

Location
- Country: United States
- State: Georgia
- Counties: Berrien, Irwin, Coffee, Ware

Highway system
- Georgia State Highway System; Interstate; US; State; Special
← SR 157	→ SR 159

State Route 158 (SR 158) is a 50.5-mile-long (81.3 km) state highway that runs west-to-east through portions of Berrien, Irwin, Coffee, and Ware counties in the south-central and southeastern parts of the U.S. state of Georgia.

== Route description ==
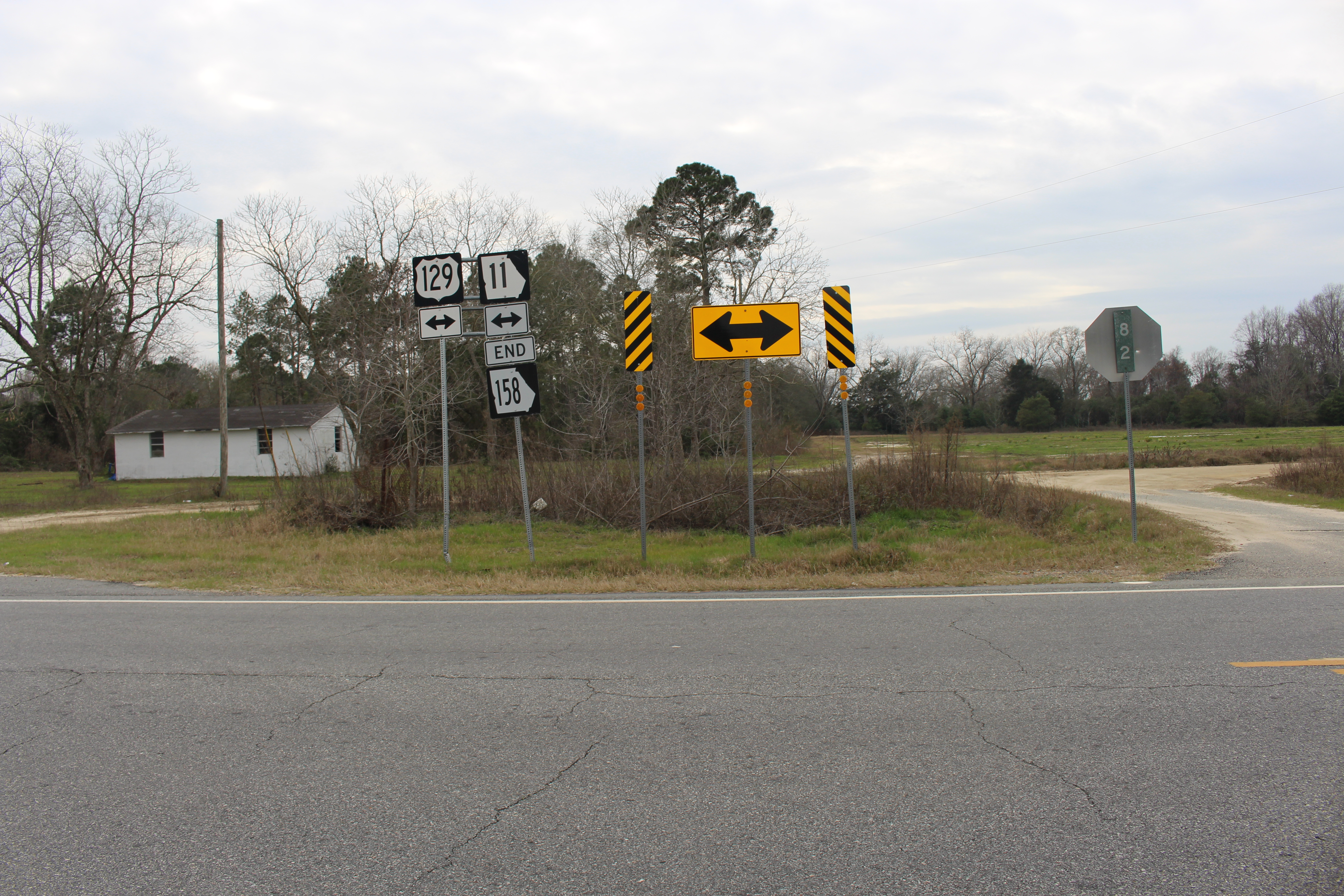
Western terminus in Alapaha

SR 158 begins at an intersection with US 129/SR 11 (Alapaha Highway), north-northwest of Alapaha, Georgia. It heads east, along part of the Berrien–Irwin county line, and then part of the Coffee–Irwin county line. Along the Coffee–Irwin county line stretch, it intersects SR 90 (Lax Highway). To the east, in Coffee County, is a short concurrency with SR 149. The road curves to the northeast, until it enters Douglas. It meets SR 206 (Bowens Mill Road SW). SR 158 heads east to US 441/SR 31. Then, it heads southeast to US 221/SR 135 (Bowens Mill Road SE). SR 158 continues to the southeast, and intersects SR 64, before crossing the southeast corner of the county into Ware County. Then, it continues to the southeast, until it meets is eastern terminus, an intersection with US 82/SR 520 (Albany Highway) northwest of Waycross.

SR 158 is not part of the National Highway System, a system of roadways important to the nation's economy, defense, and mobility.

== Major intersections ==
County	Location	mi	km	Destinations	Notes
Berrien–Irwin county line		0.0	0.0	US 129 / SR 11	Western terminus
Coffee–Irwin county line		6.6	10.6	SR 90 – Willacoochee, Ocilla	
Coffee		10.6	17.1	SR 149 north – Ambrose	Western end of SR 149 concurrency
Coffee		11.5	18.5	SR 149 south – Willacoochee	Eastern end of SR 149 concurrency
Coffee	Douglas	22.8	36.7	SR 206 (Bowens Mill Road SW)	
Coffee	Douglas	24.3	39.1	US 441 / SR 31 (South Madison Avenue)	
Coffee	Douglas	25.5	41.0	US 221 / SR 135 (Bowens Mill Road SE/Rivervalley Road)	
Coffee		36.7	59.1	SR 64 west (Jessie Whitley Road) – Pearson	Eastern terminus of SR 64
Ware		47.0	75.6	Satilla River	
Ware		50.5	81.3	US 82 / SR 520 (Albany Highway)	Eastern terminus
1.000 mi = 1.609 km; 1.000 km = 0.621 mi: Concurrency terminus

== Special routes ==
=== Douglas truck route ===
State Route 158 Truck
- Location: Douglas

State Route 158 Truck (SR 158 Truck) is a truck route around Douglas, Georgia running south of mainline SR 158. It is named Bowens Mill Road Southwest, and Bowens Mill Road Southeast.

The route begins as it joins Truck Route 32/State Route and former State Route 353. Just before a local farm and ranch supply store, the routes curve towards the east before encountering the former Central of Georgia Railway right-of-way next to Georgia State Route 135, which joins the overlap. All routes run along the north side of the Douglas Municipal Airport. SR 206 ends at US 221/441/SR 31, and US 221 joins the route, Just before reaching Brantley Boulevard the road starts to curve northeast. Truck Route 158 ends at SR 158, but US 221/Truck Route 32/SR 135 continues northeast to SR 32, Higgston, and South Carolina.
