= VLD (disambiguation) =

VLD can mean:

- Open Vlaamse Liberalen en Democraten
- Very-low-drag bullet
- Valdosta Regional Airport, IATA airport code
- Voltron: Legendary Defender
- Abbreviation for Vlaardingen
