= Abba, Georgia =

Unincorporated community in Georgia, U.S.

Coordinates: 31°45′25″N 83°22′14″W

Abba is an unincorporated community in Irwin County, in the U.S. state of Georgia.

== History ==
A post office called Abba was established in 1884, and remained in operation until 1954. Besides the post office, Abba contained a railway depot.
