= Waterloo, Georgia =

Unincorporated community in Georgia, U.S.

Coordinates: 31°35′37″N 83°28′28″W

Waterloo is an unincorporated community in Irwin County, in the U.S. state of Georgia.

== History ==
A post office called Waterloo was established in 1896, and remained in operation until 1903. According to tradition, the community received its name from the failed business dealings of a first settler, i.e. he "met his Waterloo".
