= Coffee Regional Medical Center =

Hospital provider in Douglas, Georgia, US

Coordinates: 31.5111°N 82.8645°W

Coffee Regional Medical Center is the sole hospital provider in Douglas, Georgia, in the United States, and surrounding Coffee County, Georgia. The facility opened in 1998 on Georgia State Route 32 west of downtown Douglas, Georgia, and replaces the original structure built in 1953. The 170,000-square-foot (16,000 m^{2}) hospital has 88 inpatient beds and is locally operated.
