= Twenty Mile Creek (Georgia) =

- Location within Georgia Location within the United States

Physical characteristics
- Source
  - coordinates: 31.5699155°N 82.9418127°W
- Mouth
  - coordinates: 31.5288066°N 82.8248648°W

Twenty Mile Creek is a stream in the U.S. state of Georgia. It is a tributary to the Seventeen Mile River.

Twenty Mile Creek received its locational name in the 1810s.
