= Georgia State Route 182 =

State highway in Georgia, United States

State Route 182
- River Road
- SR 182 highlighted in red

Route information
- Maintained by GDOT
- Length: 8.70 mi (14.00 km)

Major junctions
- West end: US 129 / SR 11 north of Fitzgerald
- East end: US 319 / SR 107 northeast of Fitzgerald

Location
- Country: United States
- State: Georgia
- Counties: Ben Hill

Highway system
- Georgia State Highway System; Interstate; US; State; Special
← SR 181	→ SR 183

State Route 182 (SR 182) is an 8.7-mile (14.0 km) state highway that runs west–east through northern Ben Hill County in the south-central part of the U.S. state of Georgia.

== Route description ==
The route begins at an intersection with US 129/SR 11 north of Fitzgerald. It travels southeast to its eastern terminus at an intersection with US 319/SR 107 northeast of Fitzgerald. The route, named River Road, runs parallel to the Ocmulgee River for its entire length.

== Major intersections ==
The entire route is in Ben Hill County.

Location	mi	km	Destinations	Notes
Bowens Mill	0.0	0.0	US 129 / SR 11 (Bowens Mill Highway) – Fitzgerald, Abbeville	Western terminus
	8.7	14.0	US 319 / SR 107 (Jacksonville Highway/Old River Road) – Fitzgerald, Jacksonville	Eastern terminus
1.000 mi = 1.609 km; 1.000 km = 0.621 mi
