= Hortense, Georgia =

Hortense
- Unincorporated community Census-designated place
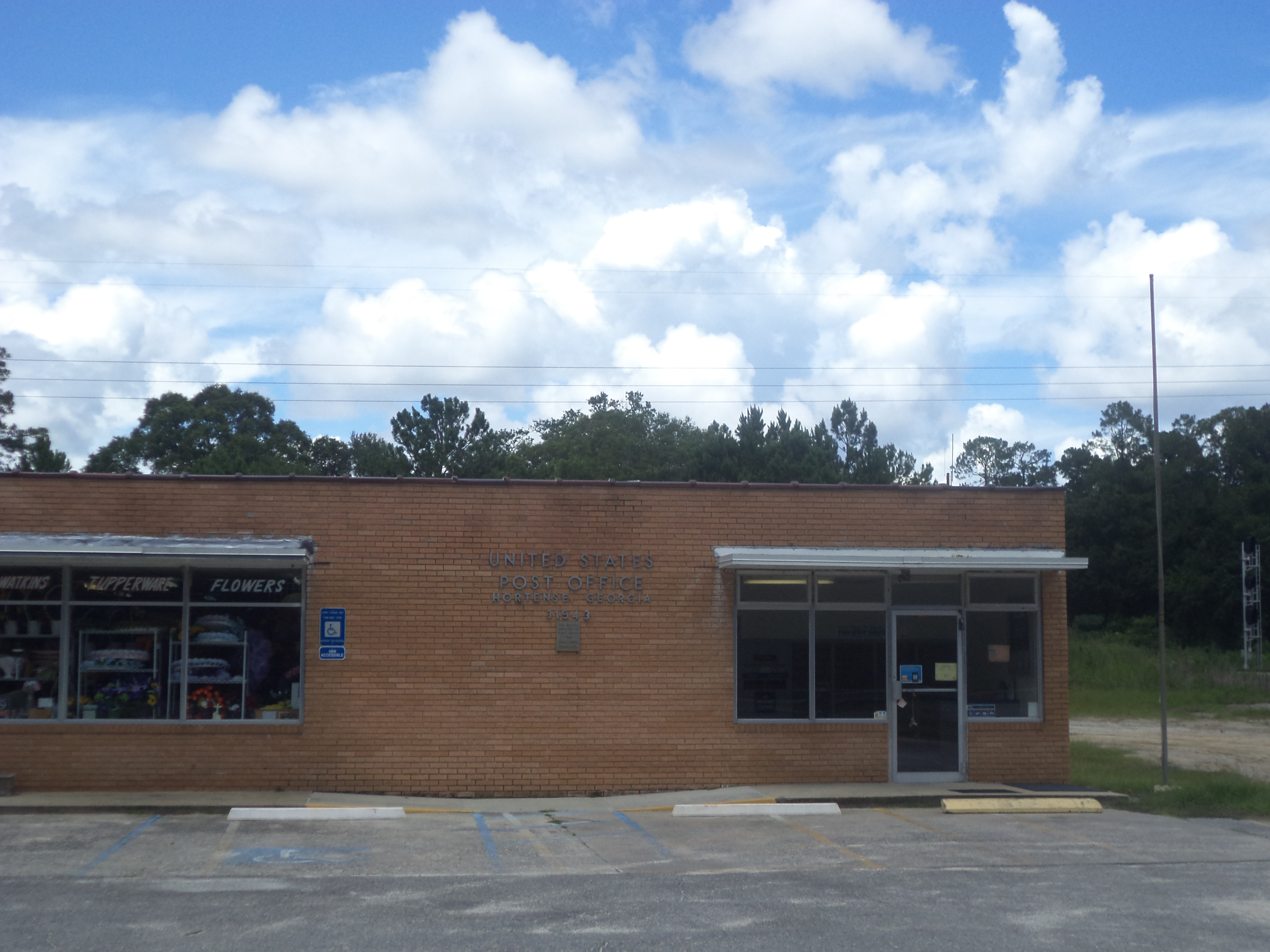
- Hortense Post Office

- Location within the state of Georgia Hortense (the United States)
- Coordinates: 31°20′12″N 81°57′22″W
- Country: United States
- State: Georgia
- County: Brantley

Population (2020)
  - Total: 252
- Time zone: UTC-5 (Eastern (EST))
  - Summer (DST): UTC-4 (EDT)
- ZIP codes: 31543
- GNIS feature ID: 332031

Hortense is an unincorporated community and census-designated place (CDP) in Brantley County, Georgia, United States. It is part of the Brunswick, Georgia metropolitan statistical area. Its ZIP code is 31543. Hortense lies at an elevation of 56 feet (17 m), and contains the intersection of US 301 and GA 32. The 2020 census listed a population of 252.

== Demographics ==
Historical population
Census	Pop.	Note	%±
2020	252		—
U.S. Decennial Census; 2020

Hortense was first listed as a census designated place in the 2020 census.

Hortense CDP, Georgia – Racial and ethnic composition Note: the US Census treats Hispanic/Latino as an ethnic category. This table excludes Latinos from the racial categories and assigns them to a separate category. Hispanics/Latinos may be of any race.
Race / Ethnicity (NH = Non-Hispanic)	Pop 2020	% 2020
White alone (NH)	233	92.46%
Black or African American alone (NH)	0	0.00%
Native American or Alaska Native alone (NH)	1	0.40%
Asian alone (NH)	0	0.00%
Pacific Islander alone (NH)	0	0.00%
Some Other Race alone (NH)	0	0.00%
Mixed Race or Multi-Racial (NH)	9	3.57%
Hispanic or Latino (any race)	9	3.57%
Total	252	100.00%

At the 2020 census, Hortense's population was 252. Among its population, 92.46% of was non-Hispanic white, 0.40% Native American, 3.57% multiracial, and 3.57% Hispanic or Latino of any race.
