= Otter Creek (Seventeen Mile Creek tributary) =

Stream in Georgia, U.S.

Coordinates: 31°30′23.71″N 82°44′58.50″W

Otter Creek is a stream in the U.S. state of Georgia. It is a tributary to Seventeen Mile River.

An otter slide most likely accounts for the name.
