= Irwin County, Georgia =

County in Georgia, United States

- County
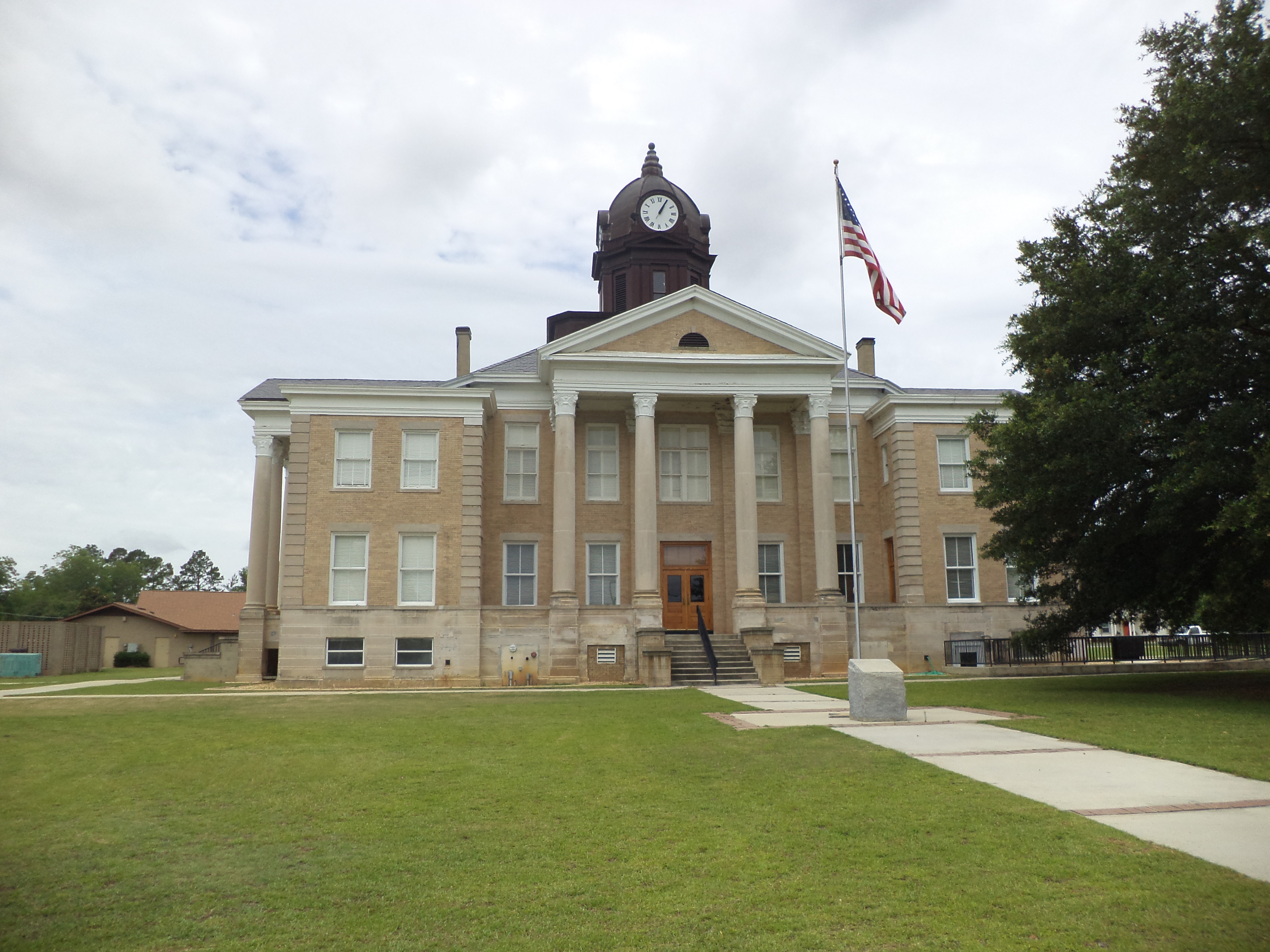
- Irwin County Courthouse, Ocilla

- Seal

- Location within the U.S. state of Georgia
- Coordinates: 31°36′N 83°16′W
- Country: United States
- State: Georgia
- Founded: December 15, 1818; 207 years ago
- Seat: Ocilla
- Largest city: Ocilla

Area
  - Total: 363 sq mi (940 km^{2})
  - Land: 354 sq mi (920 km^{2})
  - Water: 8.4 sq mi (22 km^{2}) 2.3%

Population (2020)
  - Total: 9,666
  - Estimate (2025): 9,020 ▼
  - Density: 27/sq mi (10/km^{2})
- Time zone: UTC−5 (Eastern)
  - Summer (DST): UTC−4 (EDT)
- Congressional district: 8th
- Website: irwincounty-ga.gov

Irwin County is a county located in the U.S. state of Georgia. As of the 2020 census, the population was 9,666. The county seat is Ocilla. The county was created on December 15, 1818. It was named for Governor Jared Irwin.

In the last years of the American Civil War, Irwin County gained the nickname of the Republic of Irwin due to the Unionism of many of its residents. The location where Jefferson Davis was captured is located in Irwin County near Irwinville.

== History ==
The territories of Appling, Irwin, and Early counties were land newly ceded in 1814 and 1818. These counties were created by a legislative act on December 15, 1818. All or portions of Irwin's five adjacent counties were created from Irwin county along with all of Cook, Colquitt, Lanier, Lowndes, counties and portions of Atkinson, Brooks, Echols, Wilcox, and Worth counties. Irwin was divided into 16 districts of 20 miles and 10 chains square with lots of 70 chains square containing 490 acres according to the Act of 1818. In 1820 each lot was priced at $18, but by 1831 the price was down to $5 per lot.

Irwin County had 372 white residents and 39 slaves in 1820, when the census covered a large portion of central south Georgia. In 1825, Lowndes County was formed out of the 8th, 9th, 10th, 11th, 12th, 15th, and 16th land districts in what was then the southern half of the county. In 1830, the county had 1,066 whites, 109 slaves, and 5 free people of color. In 1840, Irwin County had 1,772 whites and 266 slaves. In 1850. Irwin County had 2,874 whites, 459 slaves, and 1 free person of color. In 1853, Worth County was formed out of part of Irwin County. In 1854, Coffee County was also formed from Irwin. In 1860, Irwin County had 1,453 whites and 246 slaves. It was one of a few counties in Georgia outside of mountainous northern Georgia with slaves accounting for a small percentage of its population.

=== Civil War ===
During the American Civil War, like the United States in general, Irwin County was also ideologically divided. The county was one of the poorest at the time in Georgia. It was home to a number of Southern Unionists who opposed secession and the Confederacy. The county also provided several regiments to the Confederate Army including:

- Company F "Irwin Volunteers", 49th Regiment Georgia Infantry.

In May 1863, several companies of Duncan Lamont Clinch Jr's Fourth Georgia Cavalry were charged with searching Irwin County for deserters. They spent a month searching the county, but were only able to find twenty-two deserters on May 22, the day they arrived. The deserters were sent to Savannah for enlistment or prosecution.

A prominent Unionist in the county was Willis Jackson Bone. He lived west of Irwinville, near the Alapaha River. He was a miller and operated a steam-powered mill on what was then Bones Pond and presently Crystal Lake. Because he was a gristmill operator, Bone was exempt from conscription. During the Civil War, he helped a number of escaped slaves, Confederate deserters, and escaped Union prisoners hide in the swamps along the river. In February 1865, Bone and a large assembly of others gathered in Irwinville. Those assembled declared Irwin County part of the Union again. A lieutenant of the local militia protested the action, but was knocked down with a musket by Bone. Three cheers for Abraham Lincoln followed. The assembly then took after the lieutenant and the enrolling officer Gideon Brown. They and other Confederate sympathizers were chased out of town and threatened with death if they should return. Willis Jackson Bone was hanged near his pond in late April 1865 after he killed a local justice of the peace named Jack Walker while Bone was bringing food to an escaped slave named Toney. Walker had tried to take Toney into custody.

A few months later, Irwinville became the site of the capture of Confederate President Jefferson Davis. Davis was on his way from the capital of the Confederacy at Richmond, Virginia to board a ship with his family and flee to safety in England, Davis stopped at a hotel in Irwinville owned by Doctor G.E. White on the evening of May 9, 1865. There he conversed and socialized with the locals and no one had suspected that they were in the presence of a man of such esteem. Davis and his family moved to an encampment beside a nearby creek bed only a couple of miles from the hotel after they were done talking with the citizens of Irwinville and sometime in the early morning of May 10, the encampment was alarmed by the sound of gunfire. Davis tried to escape towards the creek wearing an overcoat and his wife had tied her scarf around his shoulders, but members of the First Wisconsin and Fourth Michigan Cavalry Regiments captured him. He was taken to Fortress Monroe, Virginia and held for two years. The location is now the Jefferson Davis Memorial Historic Site.

== Geography ==
According to the U.S. Census Bureau, the county has a total area of 363 square miles (940 km^{2}), of which 354 square miles (920 km^{2}) is land and 8.4 square miles (22 km^{2}) (2.3%) is water.

The majority and entire central and western portion of Irwin County, bordered by a line running southeast from Fitzgerald, is located in the Alapaha River sub-basin of the Suwannee River basin. The eastern corner of the county is located in the Satilla River sub-basin of the St. Marys-Satilla River basin

=== Major highways ===
- U.S. Route 129 / State Route 11
- U.S. Route 319
- State Route 11
- State Route 32
- State Route 35
- State Route 90
- State Route 107
- State Route 125
- State Route 158
- State Route 206

=== Adjacent counties ===
- Ben Hill County (north) (created 1906 from Irwin and Wilcox counties)
- Coffee County (east) (created in 1854 from Clinch, Irwin, Telfair, and Ware counties.)
- Berrien County (south) (created in 1856 from Coffee, Irwin, and Lowndes counties)
- Tift County (southwest) (created 1905 from Berrien, Irwin, and Worth counties.)
- Turner County (northwest) (created from Dooly, Irwin, Wilcox, and Worth counties)

=== Communities ===
==== City ====
- Ocilla
- Fitzgerald (portion)

==== Unincorporated communities ====
- Abba (portion)
- Arp
- Holt
- Irwinville
- Lax (portion)
- Mystic
- Osierfield
- Pinetta
- Waterloo
- Wray

== Education ==
Public education is provided by the Irwin County Elementary School, Irwin County Middle School, and Irwin County High School.

== Demographics ==
Historical population
Census	Pop.	Note	%±
1820	411		—
1830	1,180		187.1%
1840	2,038		72.7%
1850	3,334		63.6%
1860	1,699		−49.0%
1870	1,837		8.1%
1880	2,696		46.8%
1890	6,316		134.3%
1900	13,645		116.0%
1910	10,461		−23.3%
1920	12,670		21.1%
1930	12,199		−3.7%
1940	12,936		6.0%
1950	11,973		−7.4%
1960	9,211		−23.1%
1970	8,036		−12.8%
1980	8,988		11.8%
1990	8,649		−3.8%
2000	9,931		14.8%
2010	9,538		−4.0%
2020	9,666		1.3%
2025 (est.)	9,020	▼	−6.7%
U.S. Decennial Census; 1790-1880 1890-1910; 1920-1930 1930-1940; 1940-1950 1960-1980; 1980-2000 2010

=== Racial and ethnic composition ===
Irwin County, Georgia – Racial and ethnic composition Note: the US Census treats Hispanic/Latino as an ethnic category. This table excludes Latinos from the racial categories and assigns them to a separate category. Hispanics/Latinos may be of any race.
Race / Ethnicity (NH = Non-Hispanic)	Pop 1980	Pop 1990	Pop 2000	Pop 2010	Pop 2020	% 1980	% 1990	% 2000	% 2010	% 2020
White alone (NH)	6,172	5,973	7,102	6,719	6,402	68.67%	69.06%	71.51%	70.44%	66.23%
Black or African American alone (NH)	2,738	2,604	2,555	2,459	2,224	30.46%	30.11%	25.73%	25.78%	23.01%
Native American or Alaska Native alone (NH)	2	6	6	2	15	0.02%	0.07%	0.06%	0.02%	0.16%
Asian alone (NH)	3	13	32	61	119	0.03%	0.15%	0.32%	0.64%	1.23%
Native Hawaiian or Pacific Islander alone (NH)	x	x	1	0	1	x	x	0.01%	0.00%	0.01%
Other race alone (NH)	3	0	2	6	24	0.03%	0.00%	0.02%	0.06%	0.25%
Mixed race or Multiracial (NH)	x	x	31	63	218	x	x	0.31%	0.66%	2.26%
Hispanic or Latino (any race)	70	53	202	228	663	0.78%	0.61%	2.03%	2.39%	6.86%
Total	8,988	8,649	9,931	9,538	9,666	100.00%	100.00%	100.00%	100.00%	100.00%

=== 2020 census ===
As of the 2020 census, the county had a population of 9,666, 3,617 households, and 2,090 families residing in the county. The median age was 40.5 years. 21.9% of residents were under the age of 18 and 18.2% of residents were 65 years of age or older. For every 100 females there were 101.7 males, and for every 100 females age 18 and over there were 98.4 males age 18 and over. 0.0% of residents lived in urban areas, while 100.0% lived in rural areas.

The racial makeup of the county was 67.1% White, 23.1% Black or African American, 0.2% American Indian and Alaska Native, 1.2% Asian, 0.0% Native Hawaiian and Pacific Islander, 5.2% from some other race, and 3.2% from two or more races. Hispanic or Latino residents of any race comprised 6.9% of the population.

There were 3,617 households in the county, of which 32.8% had children under the age of 18 living with them and 30.0% had a female householder with no spouse or partner present. About 27.4% of all households were made up of individuals and 12.3% had someone living alone who was 65 years of age or older.

There were 4,158 housing units, of which 13.0% were vacant. Among occupied housing units, 72.8% were owner-occupied and 27.2% were renter-occupied. The homeowner vacancy rate was 1.0% and the rental vacancy rate was 7.4%.

== Politics ==
As of the 2020s, Irwin County is a Republican stronghold, voting 77% for Donald Trump in 2024. For elections to the United States House of Representatives, Irwin County is part of Georgia's 8th congressional district, currently represented by Austin Scott. For elections to the Georgia State Senate, Irwin County is part of District 13. For elections to the Georgia House of Representatives, Irwin County is part of District 169.

United States presidential election results for Irwin County, Georgia
Year	Republican		Democratic		Third party(ies)	
Year	No.	%	No.	%	No.	%
1912	45	9.39%	428	89.35%	6	1.25%
1916	24	4.30%	503	90.14%	31	5.56%
1920	114	17.84%	525	82.16%	0	0.00%
1924	35	10.80%	268	82.72%	21	6.48%
1928	162	15.01%	917	84.99%	0	0.00%
1932	22	1.53%	1,416	98.40%	1	0.07%
1936	110	9.64%	1,025	89.83%	6	0.53%
1940	197	16.95%	962	82.79%	3	0.26%
1944	259	23.10%	862	76.90%	0	0.00%
1948	146	10.77%	946	69.82%	263	19.41%
1952	516	25.92%	1,475	74.08%	0	0.00%
1956	312	16.72%	1,554	83.28%	0	0.00%
1960	352	17.80%	1,625	82.20%	0	0.00%
1964	2,017	73.16%	740	26.84%	0	0.00%
1968	430	15.03%	475	16.61%	1,955	68.36%
1972	1,851	84.68%	335	15.32%	0	0.00%
1976	561	21.80%	2,012	78.20%	0	0.00%
1980	1,056	40.12%	1,555	59.08%	21	0.80%
1984	1,330	59.51%	905	40.49%	0	0.00%
1988	1,226	57.00%	918	42.68%	7	0.33%
1992	973	34.50%	1,366	48.44%	481	17.06%
1996	1,085	42.72%	1,225	48.23%	230	9.06%
2000	1,720	60.31%	1,105	38.74%	27	0.95%
2004	2,347	68.67%	1,051	30.75%	20	0.59%
2008	2,605	67.84%	1,197	31.17%	38	0.99%
2012	2,538	68.34%	1,141	30.72%	35	0.94%
2016	2,716	74.01%	891	24.28%	63	1.72%
2020	3,134	75.19%	1,008	24.18%	26	0.62%
2024	3,340	76.92%	986	22.71%	16	0.37%

United States Senate election results for Irwin County, Georgia2
Year	Republican		Democratic		Third party(ies)	
Year	No.	%	No.	%	No.	%
2020	3,095	74.63%	982	23.68%	70	1.69%
2020	2,739	75.75%	877	24.25%	0	0.00%

United States Senate election results for Irwin County, Georgia3
Year	Republican		Democratic		Third party(ies)	
Year	No.	%	No.	%	No.	%
2020	1,459	35.64%	606	14.80%	2,029	49.56%
2020	2,732	75.53%	885	24.47%	0	0.00%
2022	2,601	76.41%	757	22.24%	46	1.35%
2022	2,427	77.47%	706	22.53%	0	0.00%

Georgia Gubernatorial election results for Irwin County
Year	Republican		Democratic		Third party(ies)	
Year	No.	%	No.	%	No.	%
2022	2,695	78.85%	702	20.54%	21	0.61%

== See also ==
- National Register of Historic Places listings in Irwin County, Georgia
- List of counties in Georgia
