= Norristown, Georgia =

- Unincorporated community Census-designated place
- Location within Georgia
- Coordinates: 32°30′25″N 82°29′39″W
- Country: United States
- State: Georgia
- County: Emanuel

Area
  - Total: 0.41 sq mi (1.07 km^{2})
  - Land: 0.41 sq mi (1.05 km^{2})
  - Water: 0.0039 sq mi (0.01 km^{2})
- Elevation: 249 ft (76 m)

Population (2020)
  - Total: 54
  - Density: 132.9/sq mi (51.33/km^{2})
- Time zone: UTC-5 (Eastern (EST))
  - Summer (DST): UTC-4 (EDT)
- ZIP code: 30447
- Area code: 478
- GNIS feature ID: 2587042

Norristown is an unincorporated community and census-designated place (CDP) in Emanuel County, Georgia, United States. Its population was 54 as of the 2020 census.

Norristown has a post office with ZIP code 30447, which opened on May 8, 1878. U.S. Route 221 passes through the community.

== History ==
The Georgia General Assembly incorporated Norristown as a town in 1907. The town's municipal charter was repealed in 1995.

== Demographics ==
Historical population
Census	Pop.	Note	%±
2010	50		—
2020	54		8.0%
U.S. Decennial Census; 1850-1870 1870-1880; 1890-1910 1920-1930; 1940 1950 1960; 1970 1980 1990; 2000 2010 2020

Norristown was first listed as a CDP in the 2010 census.

Norristown CDP, Georgia – Racial and ethnic composition Note: the US Census treats Hispanic/Latino as an ethnic category. This table excludes Latinos from the racial categories and assigns them to a separate category. Hispanics/Latinos may be of any race.
Race / Ethnicity (NH = Non-Hispanic)	Pop 2010	Pop 2020	% 2010	% 2020
White alone (NH)	53	47	89.83%	87.04%
Black or African American alone (NH)	4	4	6.78%	7.41%
Native American or Alaska Native alone (NH)	0	0	0.00%	0.00%
Asian alone (NH)	0	0	0.00%	0.00%
Pacific Islander alone (NH)	0	0	0.00%	0.00%
Some Other Race alone (NH)	0	0	0.00%	0.00%
Mixed Race or Multi-Racial (NH)	2	2	3.39%	3.70%
Hispanic or Latino (any race)	0	1	0.00%	1.85%
Total	50	54	100.00%	100.00%
