= Lax, Georgia =

Unincorporated community in Georgia, United States

- Unincorporated community
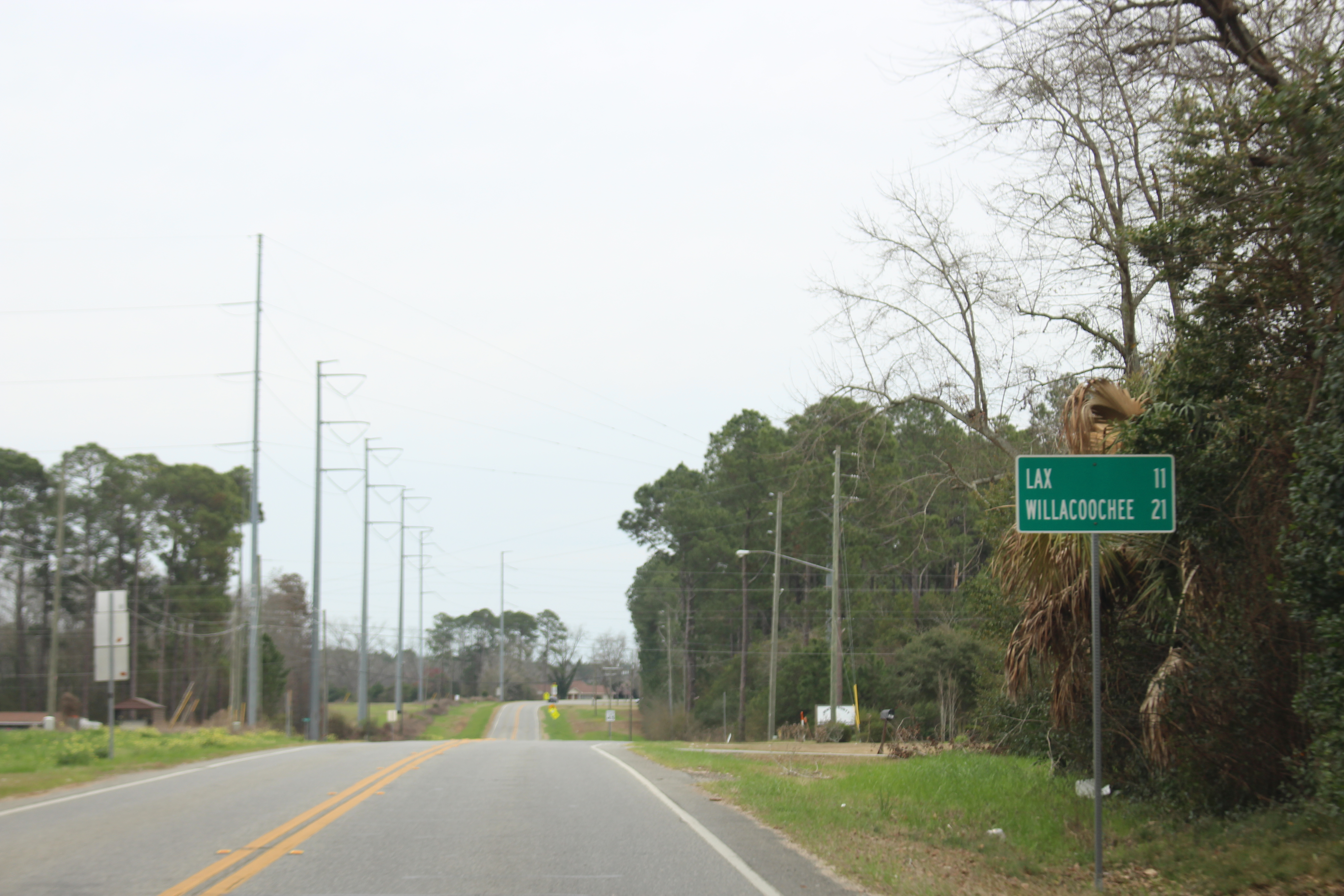
- Road sign for Lax in Ocilla, 2024

- Location in Georgia Lax, Georgia (the United States)
- Coordinates: 31.4732507°N 83.1215404°W
- Country: United States
- State: Georgia
- County: Irwin County; Coffee County
- Elevation: 312 ft (95 m)
- Time zone: UTC-5 (Eastern (EST))
  - Summer (DST): UTC-4 (EDT)
- GNIS feature ID: 332192

Lax is an unincorporated community in Irwin County and Coffee County, Georgia, United States. The community is recognized as a populated place by the Geographic Names Information System.

== History ==
A post office was established at Lax in 1889.
