= Isabella, Georgia =

Unincorporated community in Georgia, U.S.

Coordinates: 31°34′07″N 83°51′14″W

Isabella is an unincorporated community in Worth County, in the U.S. state of Georgia.

== History ==
The community was named after Isabella Worth, the wife of General William J. Worth. A post office called Isabella was established in 1854, and remained in operation until 1900. The Georgia General Assembly incorporated Isabella as a city in 1903.
