= Anguilla, U.S. Virgin Islands =

Anguilla
- Village
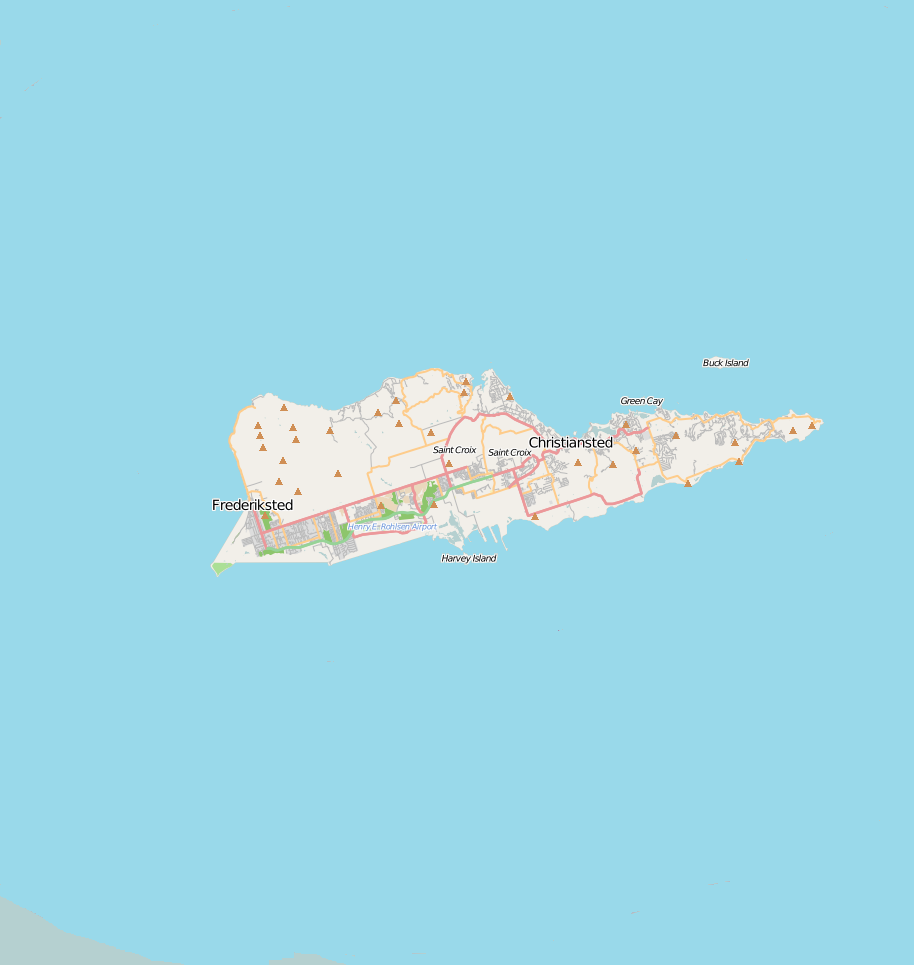
- Location in Saint Croix, United States Virgin Islands
- Coordinates: 17°42′24″N 64°46′48″W
- Country: United States Virgin Islands
- Island: Saint Croix
- Time zone: UTC-4 (AST)

Anguilla is a settlement on the island of Saint Croix in the United States Virgin Islands. It is located immediately east of Henry E. Rohlsen Airport.
