= Willie T. McArthur Farm =

Historic house in Georgia, United States

- U.S. National Register of Historic Places
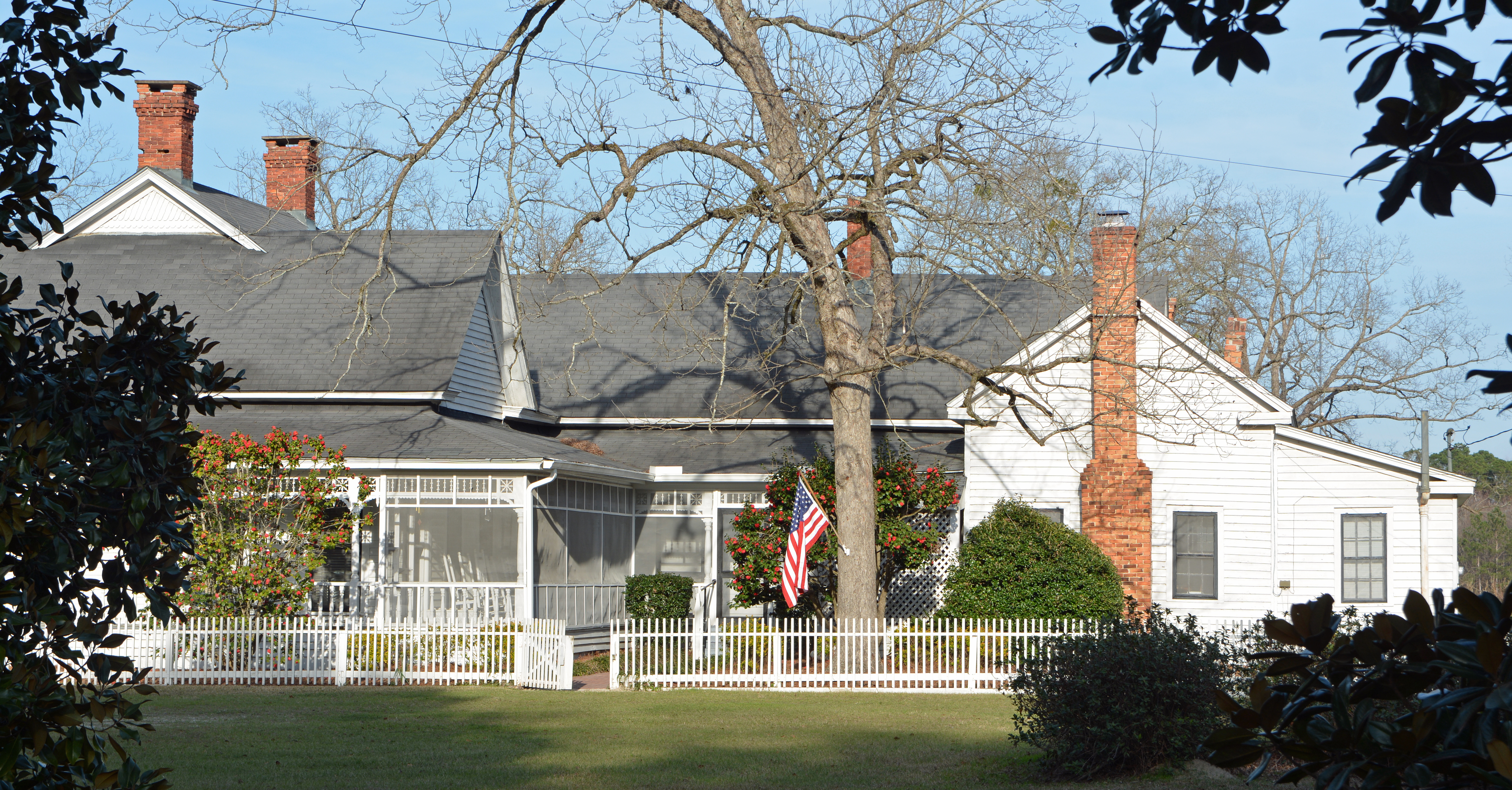

- Location within Georgia Location within the United States
- Location: 165 McArthur Rd., Ailey, Georgia
- Coordinates: 32.20050°N 82.50635°W
- Built: 1893
- Architectural style: Queen Anne
- NRHP reference No.: 12000382
- Added to NRHP: July 3, 2012

The Willie T. McArthur Farm is listed on the National Register of Historic Places.

The original two-room farmhouse was built in 1893 by Willie T. McArthur, on a 175 acres (71 ha) property that he and an uncle bought that year. A Queen Anne style house was built in 1900 which incorporated the original house as a kitchen and dining room. Willie operated one of the largest farms in Montgomery, besides serving as president of three local banks. The farm grew tobacco and cotton as cash crops and included, by 1900, numerous buildings including a commissary, a school, a cotton gin, a turpentine still, and tenant farmer houses. Willie's sons James (1919-2002) and Donald (1929-2012) also raised hogs and cattle and also grew corn, peanuts, and pecans in addition to tobacco and cotton.

The entire farm was intact and was listed on the National Register in 2012. It included a corn crib. It included a concrete-block store on U.S Highway 280, a four-bin grain elevator, and a concrete-block hog-birthing house (c.1965) and a pecan-sorting shed (c.1980).
