= Montgomery County Courthouse (Georgia) =

- U.S. National Register of Historic Places
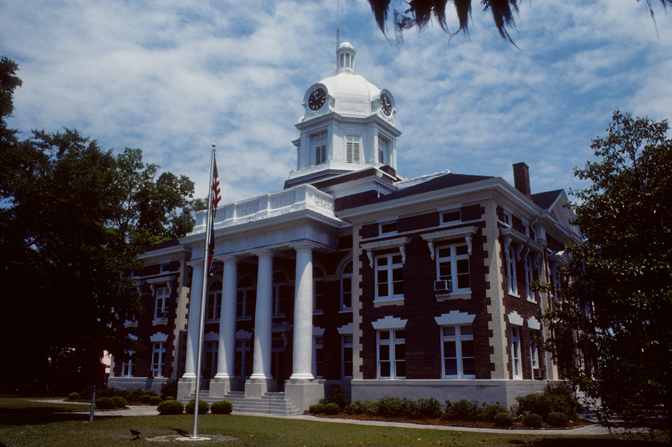
- Photo by Calvin Beale, 1986

- Location within Georgia Location within the United States
- Location: Courthouse Sq., Mount Vernon, Georgia
- Coordinates: 32°10′27″N 82°35′42″W
- Area: 1.5 acres (0.61 ha)
- Built: 1907
- Built by: McKenzie, J.H.,& Sons
- Architect: Blair, Alexander
- Architectural style: Classical Revival
- MPS: Georgia County Courthouses TR
- NRHP reference No.: 80001122
- Added to NRHP: September 18, 1980

Montgomery County Courthouse is a historic courthouse in Courthouse Square in Mount Vernon, Georgia, the county seat of Montgomery County, Georgia. It was built in 1907 and renovated in 1991–92. It was added to the National Register of Historic Places on September 18, 1980.

It is the third courthouse built in Mount Vernon for Montgomery County, which was formed in 1793. It is a two-story courthouse made of cream and red brick and granite and limestone trim. It has a Doric tetrastyle portico at its main entrance, flanked by projecting pavilions with cream brick quoins. An octagonal dome rises from the center of the structure and features hooded clocks facing in four directions.

The interior of the courthouse, as of 1980, had its original balcony, benches, and mantels. Corinthian pilasters with gold-painted capitals alternated with windows, and beaded board wainscoting went around the room. The ceiling is of pressed metal divided into nine recessed squares.

According to its historic register nomination, "This is the finest building, architecturally, in the entire Mount Vernon area."

The original clockworks are on display inside the courthouse. The original features discussed in the 1980 NRHP nomination form are still there as of 2017.

== Photos ==
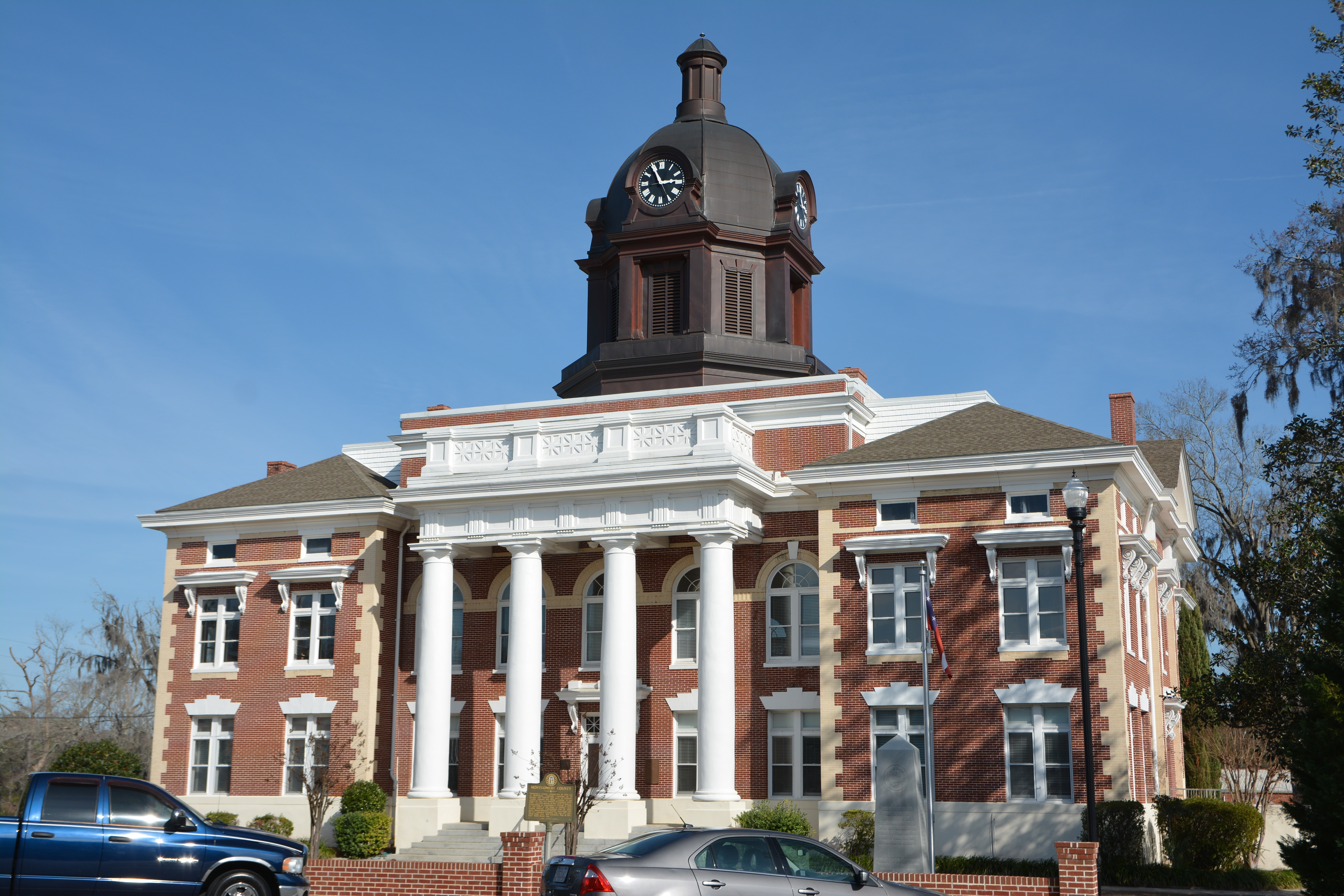
Courthouse in 2017

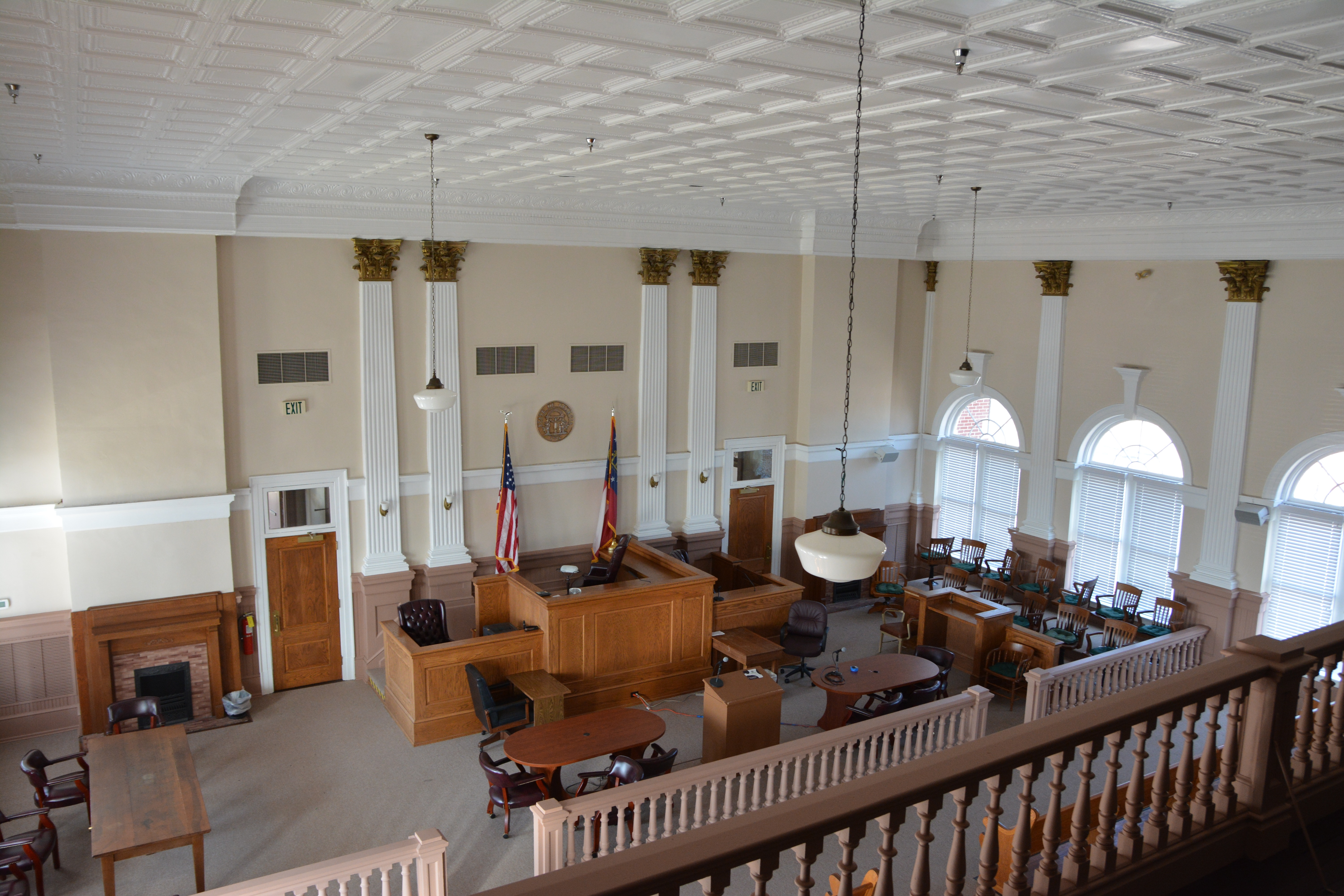
The courtroom viewed from the balcony

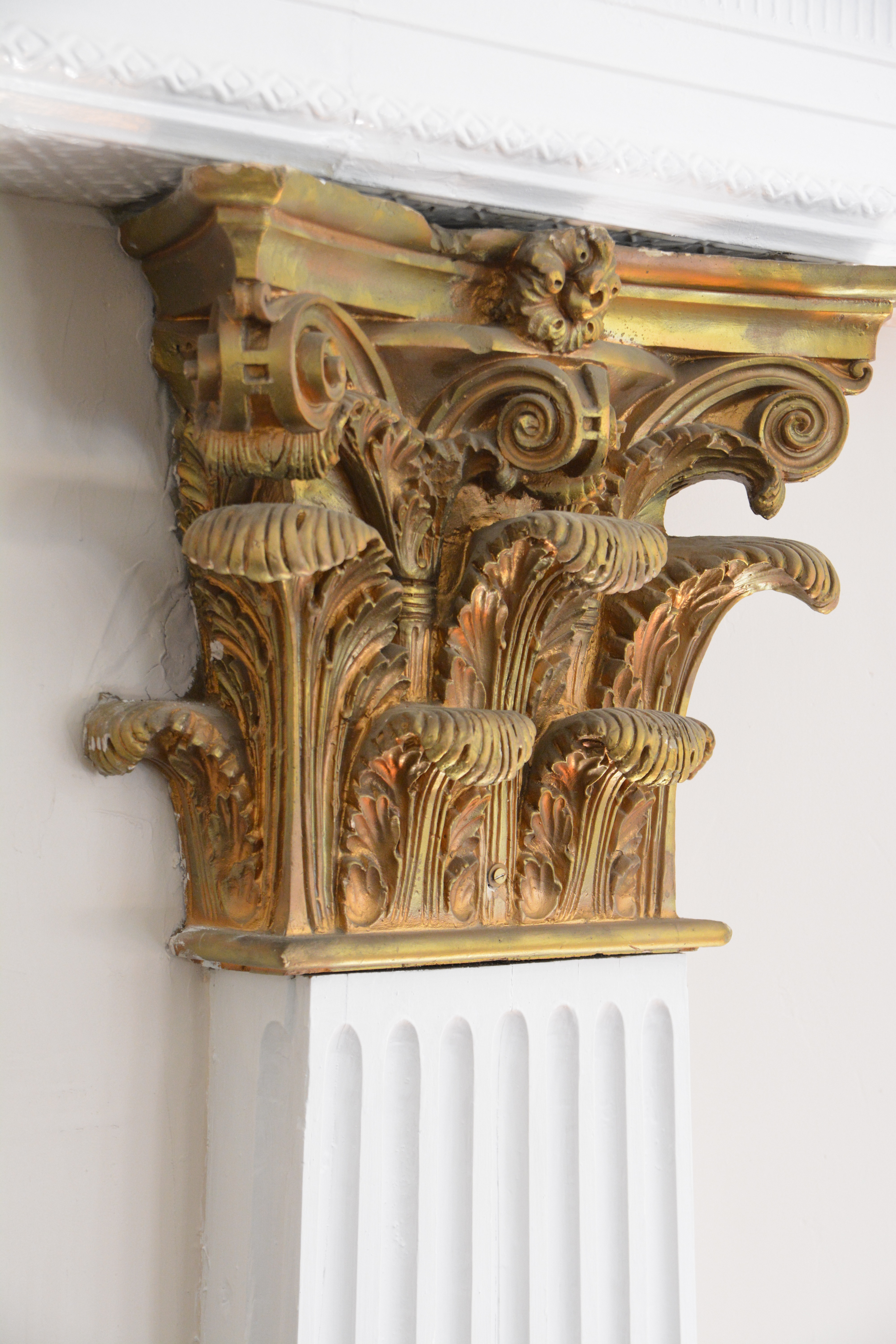
Gold Corinthian capital of a pilaster, in courtroom

== See also ==
- National Register of Historic Places listings in Montgomery County, Georgia
