= Anguilla, Georgia =

- Unincorporated community
- Location within Georgia Location within the United States
- Coordinates: 31°15′20″N 81°36′12″W
- Country: United States
- State: Georgia
- County: Glynn
- Time zone: UTC-5 (Eastern (EST))
  - Summer (DST): UTC-4 (EDT)
- Area code: 912
- GNIS feature ID: 331045

Anguilla is an unincorporated community in Glynn County, in the U.S. state of Georgia.

== History ==
The community was named after Anguilla, in recognition of that island's cotton industry.
