= Seventeen Mile River =

Stream in Georgia, U.S.

Coordinates: 31.2966°N 82.5807°W

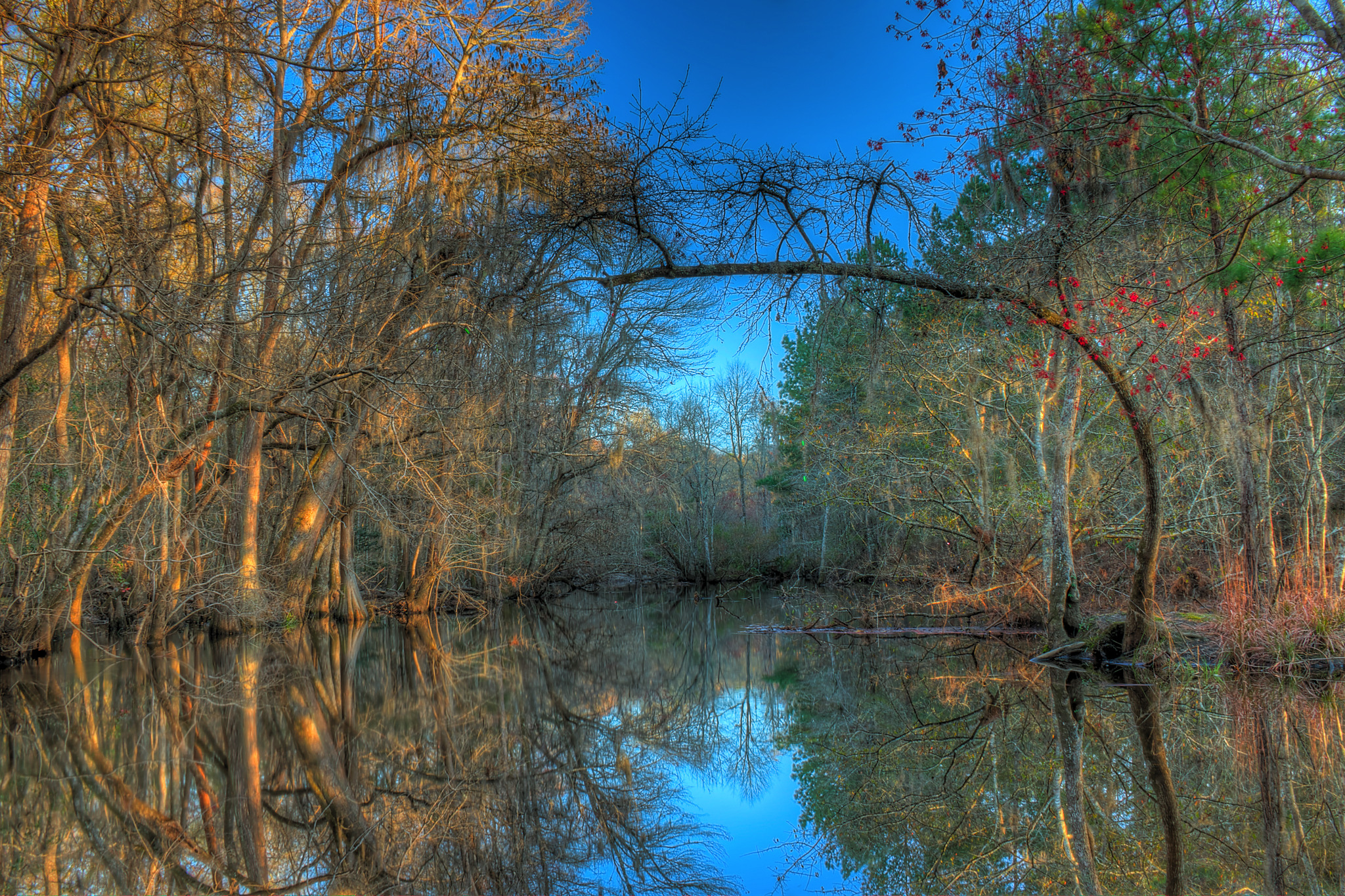

Seventeen Mile River is a stream in the U.S. state of Georgia. It is a tributary to the Satilla River.

Seventeen Mile River most likely was so named on account of its length. Variant names are "Seventeen Mile Creek" and "Seventeenmile Creek".
