= Snipesville, Georgia =

Unincorporated community in Georgia, U.S.

Coordinates: 31°45′43″N 82°45′04″W

Snipesville is an unincorporated community in Jeff Davis County, Georgia, United States.

== History ==
Originally known as "Excelsior", due to the Excelsior School established in the area, the community was renamed to "Snipesville" after the Snipe family moved into the area around 1890. The Snipe family subsequently opened a grocery store called "Snipe's Grocery", which earned the community its current name. A single grocery store, known as Wooten's Grocery, remained as Snipesville's only operating business for many years and the building it operated out of is located near the original site of Snipes Grocery.

The descendants of the Snipe Family continue to live in the area.
