= Ambrose, Georgia =

- City
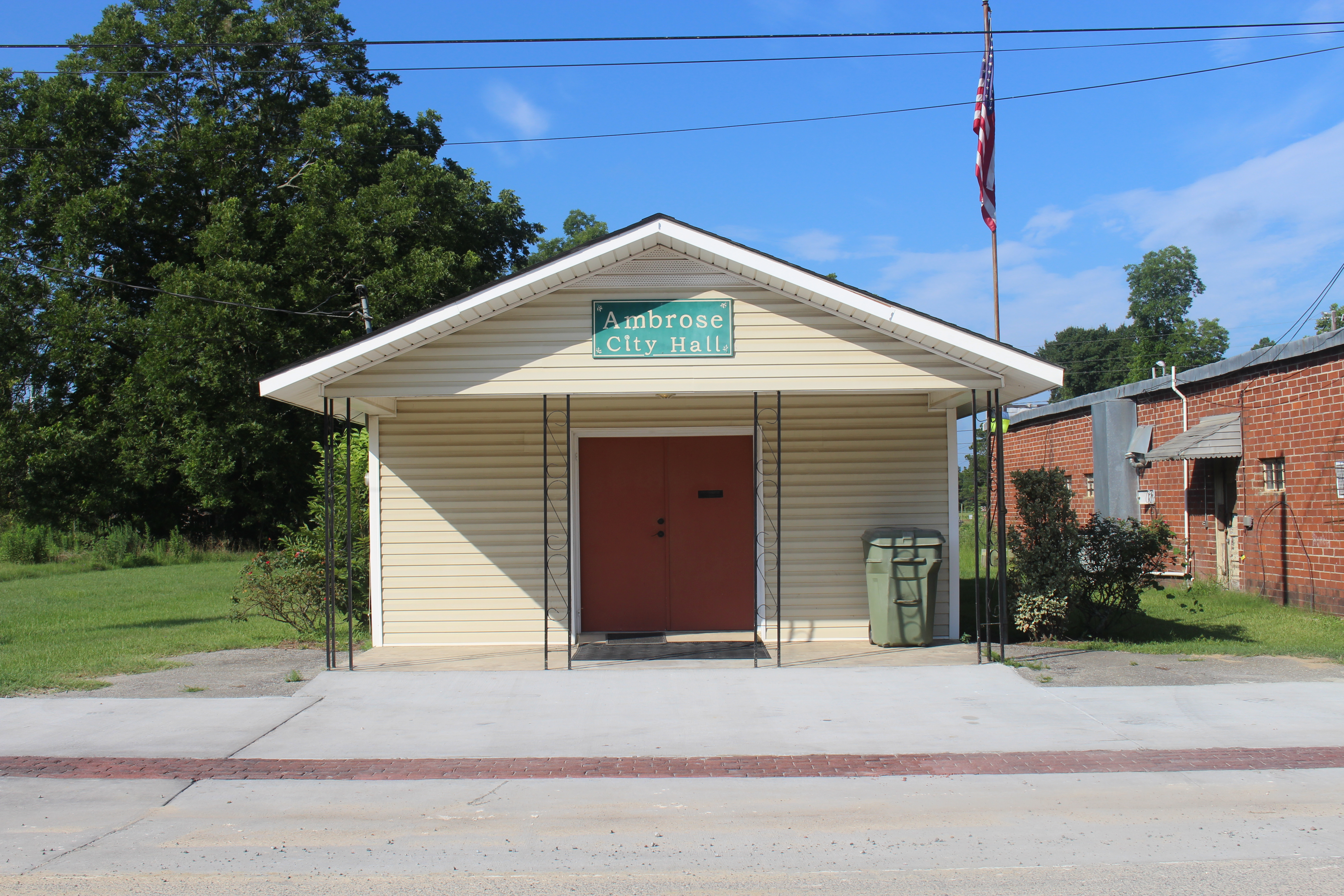
- Ambrose City Hall

- Location in Coffee County and the state of Georgia
- Coordinates: 31°35′38″N 83°0′57″W
- Country: United States
- State: Georgia
- County: Coffee

Area
  - Total: 3.14 sq mi (8.12 km^{2})
  - Land: 3.05 sq mi (7.90 km^{2})
  - Water: 0.085 sq mi (0.22 km^{2})
- Elevation: 308 ft (94 m)

Population (2020)
  - Total: 327
  - Density: 107.2/sq mi (41.39/km^{2})
- Time zone: UTC-5 (Eastern (EST))
  - Summer (DST): UTC-4 (EDT)
- ZIP code: 31512
- Area code: 912
- FIPS code: 13-02060
- GNIS feature ID: 0310508

Ambrose is a city in Coffee County, Georgia, United States. As of the 2020 census, the city had a population of 327.

== Geography ==
Ambrose is located at 31°35′38″N 83°0′57″W (31.594015, -83.015819).

According to the United States Census Bureau, the city has a total area of 3.1 square miles (8.0 km^{2}), of which 3.1 square miles (8.0 km^{2}) is land and 0.1 square miles (0.26 km^{2}) (1.92%) is water.

== Demographics ==
Historical population
Census	Pop.	Note	%±
1960	244		—
1970	253		3.7%
1980	360		42.3%
1990	288		−20.0%
2000	320		11.1%
2010	380		18.8%
2020	327		−13.9%
U.S. Decennial Census

In 2020, its population was 327, down from 380 in 2010.

=== Racial and ethnic composition ===
Ambrose city, Georgia – Racial and ethnic composition Note: the US Census treats Hispanic/Latino as an ethnic category. This table excludes Latinos from the racial categories and assigns them to a separate category. Hispanics/Latinos may be of any race.
Race / Ethnicity (NH = Non-Hispanic)	Pop 2000	Pop 2010	Pop 2020	% 2000	% 2010	% 2020
White alone (NH)	157	216	175	49.06%	56.84%	53.52%
Black or African American alone (NH)	80	64	41	25.00%	16.84%	12.54%
Native American or Alaska Native alone (NH)	1	1	0	0.31%	0.26%	0.00%
Asian alone (NH)	0	0	1	0.00%	0.00%	0.31%
Native Hawaiian or Pacific Islander alone (NH)	0	0	0	0.00%	0.00%	0.00%
Other race alone (NH)	0	0	0	0.00%	0.00%	0.00%
Mixed race or Multiracial (NH)	0	4	6	0.00%	1.05%	1.83%
Hispanic or Latino (any race)	82	95	104	25.63%	25.00%	31.80%
Total	320	380	327	100.00%	100.00%	100.00%
