= Georgia State Route 37 =

State highway in Georgia

State Route 37
- SR 37 highlighted in red

Route information
- Maintained by GDOT
- Length: 153.83 mi (247.57 km)

Major junctions
- West end: SR 10 at the Alabama state line west of Fort Gaines
- US 27 / SR 1 in Suttons Corner; US 19 / SR 3 / SR 112 / SR 300 in Camilla; US 319 / SR 35 / SR 133 in Moultrie; I-75 / US 41 / SR 7 / SR 76 in Adel; US 129 / SR 11 / SR 64 / SR 125 in Ray City; US 221 / SR 31 / SR 122 / SR 135 in Lakeland; US 129 / US 221 / SR 11 / SR 31 / SR 122 east of Lakeland
- East end: US 84 / SR 38 southwest of Homerville

Location
- Country: United States
- State: Georgia
- Counties: Clay, Calhoun, Baker, Mitchell, Colquitt, Cook, Berrien, Lanier, Clinch

Highway system
- Georgia State Highway System; Interstate; US; State; Special
← SR 36	→ SR 38

State Route 37 (SR 37) is a 153.83-mile-long (247.57 km) state highway that travels west-to-east through portions of Clay, Calhoun, Baker, Mitchell, Colquitt, Cook, Berrien, Lanier, and Clinch counties in the southwestern and south-central parts of the U.S. state of Georgia. The highway connects the Alabama state line west of Fort Gaines to the Homerville area, via Newton, Camilla, Moultrie, Adel, and Lakeland. The highway actually serves as the eastern terminus of a long multi-state route that starts in Mississippi and goes through Alabama.

== Route description ==
=== Western terminus through Moultrie ===
SR 37 begins at the Alabama state line on the western edge of Fort Gaines, in Clay County, where the roadway continues to the west as Alabama State Route 10 (SR 10; Hartford Road) over the Chattahoochee River on the Henry G McKemie Memorial Bridge. In Fort Gaines is a very brief concurrency with SR 39. It continues to the east, to an intersection with US 27/SR 1 in Suttons Corner. Then, it cuts across a corner of Calhoun County and re-enters Clay County. At the unincorporated community of Jeff, the highway re-enters Calhoun County. Southwest of there, in Edison, is a brief concurrency with SR 216. It heads east and curves to the southeast to enter Morgan, where it has a short concurrency with SR 45. Continuing to the southeast, it crosses over Ichawaynochaway Creek, then passes McClendon Lake and enters Leary. In the city is an intersection with SR 55 and SR 62 (Mercer Avenue). At this intersection, SR 62 travels concurrent with SR 37 until it splits off onto Albany Highway. The highway heads east-southeast, curves to the south-southeast, and travels in a nearly-due south direction, before entering Baker County. SR 37 gradually curves to the south and bends to the south-southwest and meets the southern terminus of SR 216 (Blakely Highway). Then, it curves to the east-southeast, crosses over Chickasawhatchee Creek, and travels through Elmodel. Farther to the southeast, it intersects SR 200, just before entering Newton. In the city, it intersects SR 91. On the southeastern edge of the city, it crosses over the Flint River and enters Mitchell County. The highway travels through rural areas of the county and enters Camilla. There, it begins to curve to the east and meets the western terminus of SR 37 Conn. (West Oakland Avenue). A few blocks to the east is an intersection with SR 112 (Scott Street). Just over 3,000 feet (910 m) later is US 19/SR 3/SR 300 (Georgia–Florida Parkway). A little farther to the east, SR 37 leaves town and runs through rural areas of the county to an intersection with SR 93. Just south of Mims Millpond, it enters Colquitt County. The highway travels through Hartsfield and Funston, until it enters Moultrie. There, it begins a concurrency with SR 111. Just over 1,000 feet (300 m) later, they cross over the Ochlockonee River and travel along the Riverside–Moultrie city line. A short distance later, also on the city line, is the end of the concurrency, with SR 111 departing on West Bypass NW. SR 37 continues to travel along the city line until the intersection with 11th Street SW/Martin Luther King Jr. Drive NW, where it re-enters Moultrie proper. In downtown Moultrie is an intersection with US 319 Bus./SR 33. Farther to the east, it crosses over Okapilco Creek and intersects US 319/SR 35/SR 133. The four highways travel concurrently to the north for about 3,000 feet (910 m). There, SR 37 splits off to the northeast onto 4th Street NE.

=== East of Moultrie ===
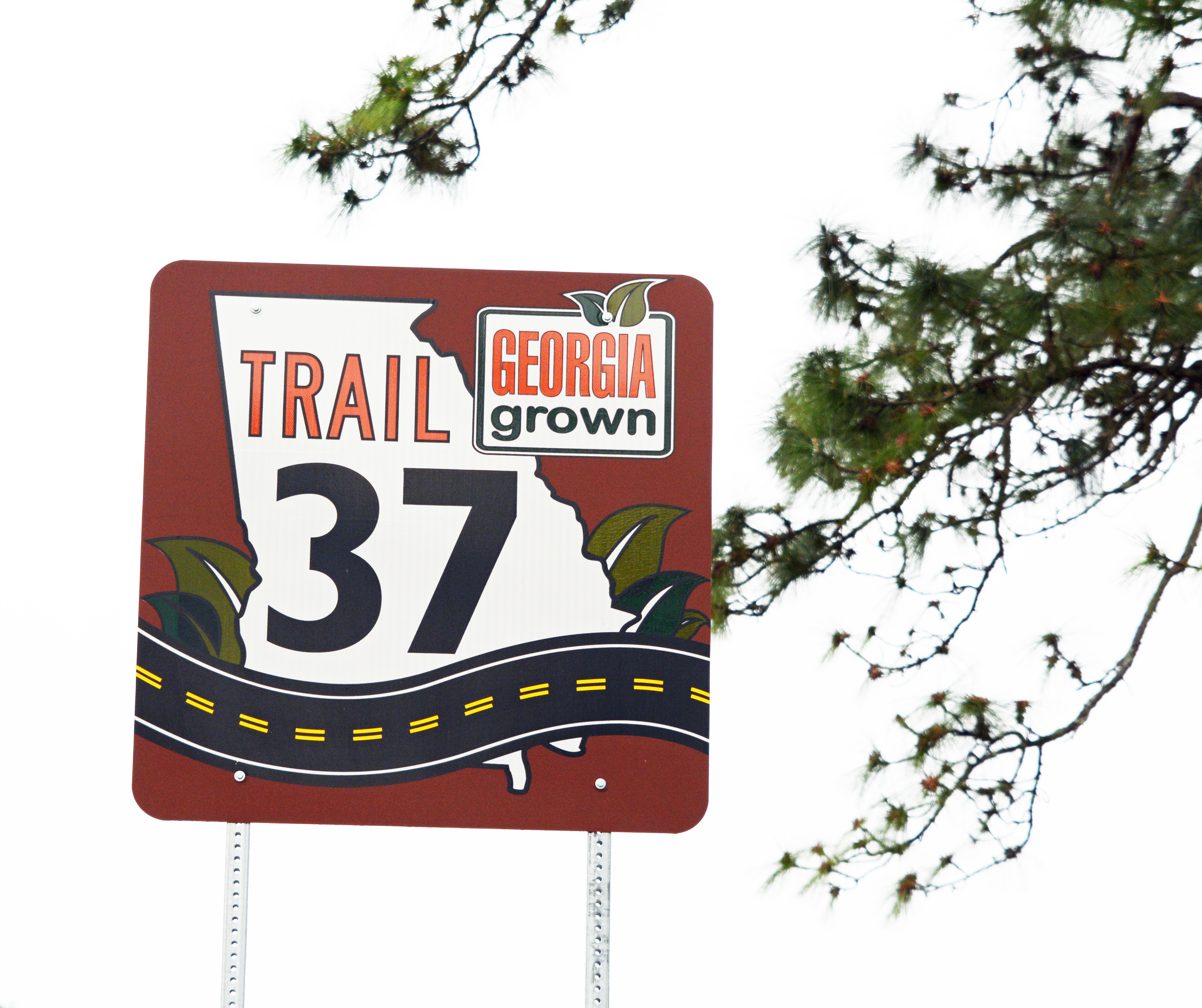
SR 37 sign east of Ray City

Just south of Reed Bingham State Park, the highway crosses over the Little River into Cook County. It travels just to the south of Pervis Lake and then curves to the east-southeast and travels south of Giddens Pond. On the northwestern edge of Adel, it curves to the southeast and passes Cook County Airport. It then has an interchange with Interstate 75 (I-75) at exit 39. After that interchange, SR 37 curves to the east-northeast. Then, it intersects SR 76 (South Elm Street). The two highways continue into downtown Adel, where they intersect US 41/SR 7 (Hutchinson Avenue). Just before leaving the city, they curve to the east-southeast. Northeast of Cook High School, the two highways diverge, with SR 37 continuing to the east-southeast. Later, it curves to the southeast and crosses over the Withlacoochee River on the Shellie W. Parrish Memorial Bridge into Berrien County. After traveling through rural areas of the county, it curves to the east-northeast and enters Ray City. In the city, it intersects US 129/SR 11/SR 125. At this intersection, US 129/SR 11 join SR 37 in a concurrency to the east. Just before leaving town, the three highways meet the western terminus of SR 64 (Samuel Street). Immediately after that intersection, they curve to the southeast. Approximately 1.5 miles (2.4 km) later, they enter Lanier County. After the county line, the concurrency begins to curve to a more easterly routing and travel north of Banks Lake. Just before entering Lakeland, they meet the northern terminus of SR 122 Conn. and cross over Mill Creek. Then, they enter the city and pass by Louis Smith Memorial Hospital. In downtown Lakeland are intersections with the western terminus of SR 11 Byp. (West Church Avenue) and the northern terminus of SR 11 Conn. (Pecan Street), before meeting SR 122 (West Main Street), which joins the concurrency. Approximately 400 feet (120 m) later, they intersect US 221/SR 31/SR 135, which join the concurrency. Immediately, SR 135 departs to the north-northwest on North Carter Street. At Oak Street, SR 135 Byp. joins the concurrency. At North College Street, SR 135 Byp. leaves the concurrency to the north-northwest. This intersection also marks the eastern terminus of SR 11 Byp. The other six highways continue to the east-northeast, crossing over Big Creek before leaving the city. Then, they cross over the Alapaha River on the Capt. Henry Will Jones Bridge. After that, US 221/SR 31/SR 122 depart the concurrency to the north-northeast. Less than 1,000 feet (300 m) later, they meet the western terminus of SR 37 Conn. Then, US 129/SR 11 leave the concurrency, while SR 37 continues to the east. The highway curves to the east-southeast and enters Clinch County. It crosses over Suwannoochee Creek on the Roger E. James Bridge and meets the eastern terminus of SR 168 (Nashville Highway). It continues to the east-southeast until it meets its eastern terminus, an intersection with US 84/SR 38, just southwest of Homerville.

=== National Highway System ===
The following portions of SR 37 are part of the National Highway System, a system of routes determined to be the most important for the nation's economy, mobility, and defense:

- A very brief portion in Camilla, just west of US 19/SR 3/SR 300
- Between SR 111 and US 319 Bus./SR 33 in Moultrie.

== Major intersections ==
County	Location	mi	km	Destinations	Notes
Chattahoochee River		0.000	0.000	SR 10 west (Hartford Road) – Shorterville	Western terminus; roadway continues into Alabama over the Henry G. McKemie Memorial Bridge
Clay	Fort Gaines	0.360	0.579	SR 39 north (Hancock Street) – Georgetown	West end of SR 39 concurrency
Clay	Fort Gaines	0.429	0.690	SR 39 south (Washington Street) – Blakely	East end of SR 39 concurrency
Clay	Suttons Corner	12.664	20.381	US 27 / SR 1 – Blakely, Cuthbert	
Calhoun	No major junctions				
Clay	No major junctions				
Calhoun	Edison	19.906	32.036	SR 216 south (Turner Street) – Arlington	West end of SR 216 concurrency
Calhoun	Edison	20.261	32.607	SR 216 north (Bay Avenue NE) – Cuthbert	East end of SR 216 concurrency
Calhoun	Morgan	28.442	45.773	SR 45 south (West Main Street) – Arlington	West end of SR 45 concurrency
Calhoun	Morgan	28.646	46.101	SR 45 north (School Street NE) – Dawson	East end of SR 45 concurrency
Calhoun	Leary	35.309	56.824	SR 55 north / SR 62 west (Mercer Avenue) – Arlington, Dawson	West end of SR 62 concurrency; southern terminus of SR 55
Calhoun	Leary	35.514	57.154	SR 62 east – Albany	East end of SR 62 concurrency
Baker		45.292	72.890	SR 216 north – Milford	Southern terminus of SR 216
Baker		53.747	86.497	SR 200 – Newton, Damascus	
Baker	Newton	54.125	87.106	SR 91 – Colquitt, Albany	
Flint River		54.722	88.067	Unnamed bridge; Baker–Mitchell county line	
Mitchell	Camilla	63.784	102.650	SR 37 Conn. east (West Oakland Avenue)	Western terminus of SR 37 Conn.
Mitchell	Camilla	63.917	102.864	SR 97 south (Butler Street) – Hopeful	Northern terminus of SR 97
Mitchell	Camilla	64.020	103.030	SR 112 / Dixie Highway north (Scott Street) – Cairo, Sylvester	West end of Dixie Highway Scenic Byway concurrency
Mitchell	Camilla	64.638	104.025	US 19 / SR 3 / SR 300 (Georgia–Florida Parkway) – Thomasville, Albany	
Mitchell	Camilla	64.773	104.242	Dixie Highway south (MacArthur Drive)	East end of Dixie Highway Scenic Byway concurrency
Mitchell		75.168	120.971	SR 93 – Pelham, Sale City	
Colquitt	Moultrie	89.484	144.011	SR 111 south – Meigs	West end of SR 111 concurrency
Colquitt	Moultrie–Riverside line	89.694	144.349	Ochlockonee River	
Colquitt	Moultrie–Riverside line	89.790	144.503	SR 111 north (West Bypass NW)	East end of SR 111 concurrency
Colquitt	Moultrie	90.996	146.444	US 319 Bus. south / SR 33 south (Main Street)	Southbound lanes of US 319 Bus./SR 33 on one-way pairs
Colquitt	Moultrie	91.072	146.566	US 319 Bus. north / SR 33 north (1st Street SE)	Northbound lanes of US 319 Bus./SR 33 on one-way pairs
Colquitt	Moultrie	92.635	149.082	US 319 south / SR 35 south / SR 133 south (East Bypass) – Thomasville, Berlin, Tallahassee	West end of US 319/SR 35/SR 133 concurrency
Colquitt	Moultrie	93.384	150.287	US 319 north / SR 35 north / SR 133 north (East Bypass) – Tifton, Albany	East end of US 319/SR 35/SR 133 concurrency
Little River		107.140	172.425	Unnamed bridge; Colquitt–Cook county line	
Cook	Adel	113.629	182.868	I-75 (SR 401) – Valdosta, Macon	I-75 exit 39
Cook	Adel	114.011	183.483	SR 76 south (South Elm Street) – Barney	West end of SR 76 concurrency
Cook	Adel	114.609	184.445	US 41 (Hutchinson Avenue) / SR 7 – Hahira, Tifton	
Cook		116.529	187.535	SR 76 east – Nashville	East end of SR 76 concurrency
Withlacoochee River		120.946	194.644	Shellie W. Parrish Memorial Bridge; Cook–Berrien county line	
Berrien	Ray City	128.918	207.473	US 129 north / SR 11 north (Ray City Highway) / SR 125 (Ray City Highway/Patton Avenue) – Valdosta, Nashville	West end of US 129/SR 11 concurrency
Berrien	Ray City	129.341	208.154	SR 64 east (Samuel Street) – Pearson	Western terminus of SR 64
Lanier		135.152	217.506	SR 122 Conn. south	Northern terminus of SR 122 Conn.
Lanier	Lakeland	136.529	219.722	SR 11 Byp. east (West Church Avenue)	Western terminus of SR 11 Byp.
Lanier	Lakeland	136.574	219.795	SR 11 Conn. south (Pecan Street)	Northern terminus of SR 11 Conn.
Lanier	Lakeland	136.707	220.009	SR 122 west (West Main Street) – Hahira	West end of SR 122 concurrency
Lanier	Lakeland	136.776	220.120	US 221 south / SR 31 south / SR 135 south (South Valdosta Road) – Valdosta, Naylor	West end of US 221/SR 31 and SR 135 concurrencies
Lanier	Lakeland	136.789	220.141	SR 135 north (North Carter Street) – Willacoochee	East end of SR 135 concurrency
Lanier	Lakeland	136.992	220.467	SR 135 Byp. south (Oak Street)	West end of SR 135 Byp. concurrency
Lanier	Lakeland	137.073	220.598	SR 11 Byp. west / SR 135 Byp. north (North College Street)	East end of SR 135 Byp. concurrency; eastern terminus of SR 11 Byp.
Lanier	Alapaha River	138.699	223.214	Capt. Henry Will Jones Bridge	
Lanier		139.399	224.341	US 221 north / SR 31 north / SR 122 north – Pearson, Cogdell	East end of US 221/SR 31 and SR 122 concurrencies
Lanier		139.528	224.549	SR 37 Conn. east	Western terminus of SR 37 Conn.
Lanier		139.737	224.885	US 129 south / SR 11 south – Stockton	East end of US 129/SR 11 concurrency
Clinch	Suwannoochee Creek	148.478	238.952	Roger E. James Bridge	
Clinch		149.386	240.413	SR 168 west (Nashville Highway) – Nashville	Eastern terminus of SR 168
Clinch		153.834	247.572	US 84 / SR 38 – Valdosta, Homerville	Eastern terminus
1.000 mi = 1.609 km; 1.000 km = 0.621 mi: Concurrency terminus

== Special routes ==
=== Camilla connector route ===
State Route 37 Connector
- Location: Camilla
- Length: 0.3 mi (480 m)

State Route 37 Connector (SR 37 Conn.) is a 0.3-mile-long (0.48 km) connector route that exists entirely within the city limits of Camilla, in the central part of Mitchell County. It is known as West Oakland Avenue for its entire length.

It begins at an intersection with the SR 37 mainline in the western part of Camilla. It heads northeast and curves to the east to meet its eastern terminus, an intersection with SR 112 (North Scott Street).

SR 37 Conn. is not part of the National Highway System, a system of roadways important to the nation's economy, defense, and mobility.

The entire route is in Camilla, Mitchell County.

mi	km	Destinations	Notes
0.0	0.0	SR 37 (Newton Road/West Broad Street) – Newton, Hartsfield	Western terminus
0.3	0.48	SR 112 (North Scott Street) – Cairo	Eastern terminus
1.000 mi = 1.609 km; 1.000 km = 0.621 mi

=== Camilla truck route ===
State Route 37 Truck
- Location: Camilla
- Length: 1.0 mi (1.6 km)

State Route 37 Truck (SR 37 Truck) is a truck route that exists entirely within the city limits of Camilla, in the central part of Mitchell County. It is known as West Oakland Avenue, as well as East Oakland Avenue and the Georgia–Florida Parkway.

The highway is concurrent with SR 37 Conn., SR 112, and US 19/SR 3.

The entire route is in Camilla, Mitchell County.

mi	km	Destinations	Notes
0.0	0.0	SR 37 (Newton Road/West Broad Street) – Newton, Hartsfield	Western terminus
0.3	0.48	SR 112 (North Scott Street) – Cairo	East end of SR 37 Conn. concurrency; west end of SR 112 concurrency
0.9	1.4	US 19 / SR 3 / SR 300 north (Georgia–Florida Parkway) / SR 112 (East Oakland Avenue) – Albany, Thomasville, Sylvester	East end of SR 112 concurrency; west end of US 19/SR 3/SR 300 concurrency
1.0	1.6	SR 37 (East Broad Street/Moultrie Road) / US 19 south / SR 3 south / SR 300 south (Georgia–Florida Parkway) – Moultrie, Newton	Eastern terminus
1.000 mi = 1.609 km; 1.000 km = 0.621 mi: Concurrency terminus

=== Lanier County connector route ===
State Route 37 Connector
- Location: Eastern Lanier County
- Length: 0.3 mi (480 m)

State Route 37 Connector (SR 37 Conn.) is a 0.3-mile-long (0.48 km) connector route that exists entirely within the east-central part of Lanier County. It is located east of Lakeland.

It begins at an intersection with US 129/SR 11/SR 37. It heads southeast to meet its eastern terminus, an intersection with US 129/SR 11 and acts as a bypass of US 129/SR 11's intersection with SR 37. The road itself was originally part of US 129/SR 11 until 2009.

SR 37 Conn. is not part of the National Highway System, a system of roadways important to the nation's economy, defense, and mobility.

The entire route is in Lanier County.

Location	mi	km	Destinations	Notes
	0.0	0.0	US 129 / SR 11 / SR 37 – Lakeland, Homerville	Western terminus
	0.3	0.48	US 129 / SR 11 – Stockton	Eastern terminus
1.000 mi = 1.609 km; 1.000 km = 0.621 mi
