= Georgia State Route 122 =

State highway in Georgia

State Route 122
- Georgia State Route 122 highlighted in red

Route information
- Maintained by GDOT
- Length: 98.2 mi (158.0 km)

Major junctions
- West end: US 19 / US 84 / SR 3 / SR 38 / SR 300 in Thomasville
- I-75 / US 41 / SR 7 in Hahira; US 129 / US 221 / SR 11 / SR 31 / SR 37 / SR 135 in Lakeland; US 129 / SR 11 / SR 37 east of Lakeland; US 221 / SR 31 northeast of Lakeland; US 441 / SR 89 northwest of Homerville
- East end: US 1 / US 23 / US 82 / SR 4 / SR 520 west of Waycross

Location
- Country: United States
- State: Georgia
- Counties: Thomas, Brooks, Lowndes, Lanier, Clinch, Ware

Highway system
- Georgia State Highway System; Interstate; US; State; Special
← SR 121	→ US 123

State Route 122 (SR 122) is a 98.2-mile-long (158.0 km) state highway that travels west-to-east through portions of Thomas, Brooks, Lowndes, Lanier, Clinch, and Ware counties in the southern part of the U.S. state of Georgia. The highway connects the cities of Thomasville and Waycross, via Lakeland.

== Route description ==
SR 122 begins at an intersection with US 19/US 84/SR 3/SR 38/SR 300 (Thomasville Bypass) in Thomasville, in Thomas County. The road heads to the east, passing the Thomasville Regional Airport, and travels through rural areas of the county until it reaches the town of Pavo. There, it has a brief concurrency with SR 33. The concurrency ends at the Thomas–Brooks county line. The road heads northeast, intersecting SR 333 (Moultrie Road) and SR 133, before curving to the east to enter Barney. It intersects SR 76 in town. Farther to the east, it crosses over the Little River into Lowndes County. It then has an interchange with Interstate 75 (I-75) in Hahira. At this interchange, US 41/SR 7, which are concurrent with I-75 south of this interchange, become concurrent with SR 122 into the central part of town. Northeast of Haira is a bridge over the Withlacoochee River. It intersects SR 125 (Bemiss Road/Valdosta Ray City Highway) at the meeting point of Lowndes, Berrien, and Lanier counties. Then, it runs along the Lowndes–Lanier county line for about 1 mile (1.6 km), before entering Lanier County proper. The highway parallels most of the northern part of Banks Lake, and intersects SR 122 Connector, prior to entering Lakeland. In Lakeland, it intersects SR 11 Connector (North Pecan Street). Then, it meets SR 129/SR 11/SR 37 (West Thigpen Avenue). About 2 blocks later is US 221/SR 31/SR 135 (South Valdosta Road). At this intersection, US 221/SR 31 join the concurrency to the east. At Oak Street, SR 135 Bypass joins the concurrency for a short while. At College Street is the southern end of SR 11 Bypass. Also, SR 135 Bypass departs to the north. US 129/SR 11/SR 37 depart to the east, while US 221/SR 31/SR 122 head to the north, and then SR 122 departs to the northeast. After entering Clinch County, the highway has a very brief concurrency with SR 168. Northwest of Homerville, it intersects US 441/SR 89 (Pearson Highway). The route continues through mostly rural areas of the county and enters Ware County. SR 122 heads east until it meets an intersection with US 1/US 23/US 82/SR 4/SR 520 (South Georgia Parkway), west of Waycross.

SR 122 is not part of the National Highway System, a system of roadways important to the nation's economy, defense, and mobility.

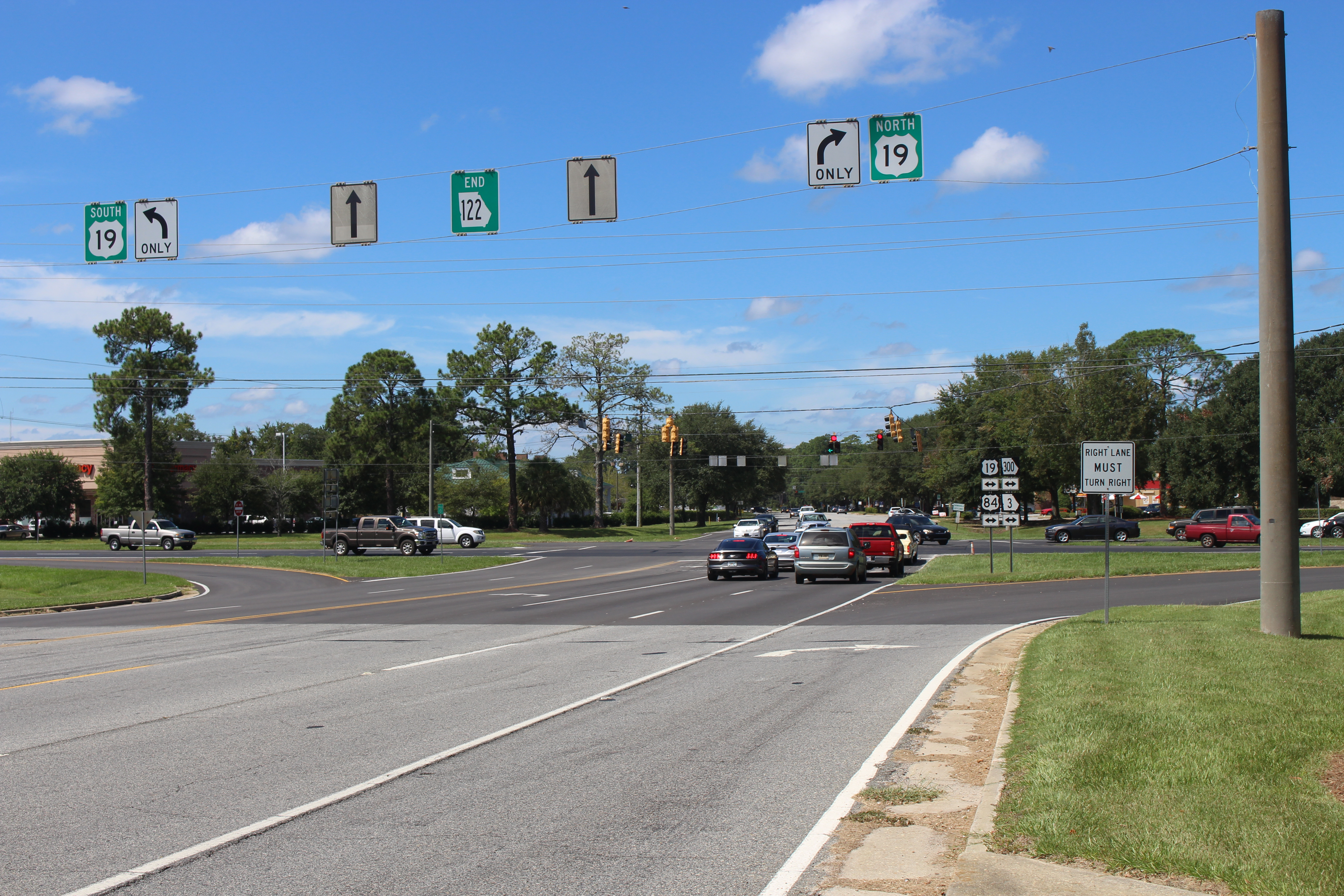
GA 122 End at US 19 in Thomasville

== Major intersections ==
County	Location	mi	km	Destinations	Notes
Thomas	Thomasville	0.0	0.0	US 19 / SR 3 / SR 300 / US 84 / SR 38 (Thomasville Bypass) – Monticello, Meigs, Cairo, Valdosta	Western terminus
Thomas	Pavo	14.6	23.5	SR 33 north (Robert Street) – Moultrie	Western end of SR 33 concurrency
Thomas–Brooks county line	Pavo	15.0	24.1	SR 33 south (County Line Street) – Barwick	Eastern end of SR 33 concurrency
Brooks		25.1	40.4	SR 333 (Moultrie Road) – Quitman	
Brooks		26.2	42.2	SR 133 – Valdosta, Moultrie	
Brooks	Barney	28.9	46.5	SR 76 – Quitman, Morven	
Lowndes	Hahira	36.4	58.6	I-75 (SR 401) / US 41 south / SR 7 south	Western end of US 41/SR 7 concurrency; I-75 exit 29
Lowndes	Hahira	37.3	60.0	US 41 north / SR 7 north (North Church Street)	Eastern end of US 41/SR 7 concurrency
Lowndes–Berrien– Lanier county tripoint		48.2	77.6	SR 125 (Bemiss Road/Valdosta Ray City Highway) – Valdosta, Ray City	
Lanier		54.6	87.9	SR 122 Conn. north	Southern terminus of SR 122 Conn.
Lanier	Lakeland	55.9	90.0	SR 11 Conn. north (North Pecan Street)	Southern terminus of SR 11 Conn.
Lanier	Lakeland	56.0	90.1	US 129 north / SR 11 north / SR 37 north (West Thigpen Avenue)	Western end of US 129/SR 11/SR 37 concurrency
Lanier	Lakeland	56.1	90.3	US 221 south / SR 31 south / SR 135 (South Valdosta Road)	Western end of US 221/SR 31 concurrency
Lanier	Lakeland	56.3	90.6	SR 135 Byp. south (South Oak Street)	Western end of SR 135 Byp. concurrency
Lanier	Lakeland	56.4	90.8	SR 11 Byp. north / SR 135 Byp. north (North College Street)	Eastern end of SR 135 Byp. concurrency; southern terminus of SR 11 Byp.
Lanier		58.0	93.3	Captain Henry Will Jones Bridge over the Alapaha River	
Lanier		58.7	94.5	US 129 south / SR 11 south / SR 37 east	Eastern end of US 129/SR 11/SR 37 concurrency
Lanier		59.7	96.1	US 221 north / SR 31 north	Eastern end of US 221/SR 31 concurrency
Clinch		65.5	105.4	SR 168 west – Nashville	Western end of SR 168 concurrency
Clinch		65.7	105.7	SR 168 east	Eastern end of SR 168 concurrency
Clinch		72.2	116.2	US 441 / SR 89	
Ware		98.2	158.0	US 1 / US 23 / US 82 / SR 4 / SR 520 (South Georgia Parkway) – Folkston, Alma, Pearson, Brunswick	Eastern terminus
1.000 mi = 1.609 km; 1.000 km = 0.621 mi: Concurrency terminus

== Related route ==
State Route 122 Connector
- Location: West of Lakeland
- Length: 0.7 mi (1,100 m)

State Route 122 Connector (SR 122 Connector) exists entirely within the central part of Lanier County, a short distance west of Lakeland.

It begins on the shores of Banks Lake, at an intersection with the SR 122 mainline. It heads northwest to an intersection with Corbitt Road. The highway continues to the northwest until it meets its northern terminus, an intersection US 129/SR 11/SR 37.

SR 122 Connector is not part of the National Highway System, a system of roadways important to the nation's economy, defense, and mobility.

The entire route is in Lanier County.

Location	mi	km	Destinations	Notes
	0.0	0.0	SR 122 – Hahira, Lakeland	Southern terminus
	0.7	1.1	US 129 / SR 11 / SR 37	Northern terminus
1.000 mi = 1.609 km; 1.000 km = 0.621 mi
