= Georgia State Route 31 =

State highway in Georgia

State Route 31
- SR 31 highlighted in red

Route information
- Maintained by GDOT
- Length: 166.9 mi (268.6 km)
- Existed: 1919–present

Major junctions
- South end: SR 145 at the Florida state line south of Clyattville
- I-75 south of Valdosta; US 84 / US 221 / SR 38 in Valdosta; US 129 / SR 11 / SR 37 / SR 122 / SR 135 in Lakeland; US 441 / SR 89 near Pearson; US 82 / SR 520 in Pearson; US 319 / SR 107 near Jacksonville; US 23 / US 280 / US 341 / SR 27 / SR 30 in McRae; I-16 / US 441 Byp. / SR 117 in Dublin; US 80 / US 319 / US 441 / SR 19 / SR 26 / SR 29 in Dublin
- North end: US 319 / SR 15 / SR 57 / SR 78 in Wrightsville

Location
- Country: United States
- State: Georgia
- Counties: Lowndes, Lanier, Clinch, Atkinson, Coffee, Telfair, Wheeler, Dodge, Laurens, Johnson

Highway system
- Georgia State Highway System; Interstate; US; State; Special
← SR 30	→ SR 32

State Route 31 (SR 31) is a 166.9-mile-long (268.6 km) state highway that travels south-to-north through portions of Lowndes, Lanier, Clinch, Atkinson, Coffee, Telfair, Wheeler, Dodge, Laurens, and Johnson counties in the south-central part of the U.S. state of Georgia. The highway connects the Florida state line, south of Clyattville with Wrightsville, via Valdosta, Douglas, and Dublin.

SR 31 formerly had a segment from Homerville to Pearson, but it was later decommissioned. The highway was then incrementally extended in both directions from its resulting Pearson–Douglas segment to its current path.

== Route description ==
=== Florida to Douglas ===
SR 31 begins at the Florida state line south-southeast of Clyattville, in Lowndes County, where the roadway continues as State Road 145. Almost immediately, it crosses over the Withlacoochee River. The highway curves to the northwest and back to the north and passes Oris Blackburn Memorial Park. It begins to curve to the northeast and enters Clyattville, where it meets the western terminus of SR 376 (Clyattville–Lake Park Road). The highway continues to the northeast and has an interchange with Interstate 75 (I-75). Approximately 1 mile (1.6 km) later, it skirts along the southeastern edge of Valdosta Regional Airport. At the intersection with Madison Highway, it turns to the right and becomes known as Inner Perimeter Road, part of an eastern bypass of most of the city. At South Patterson Street, US 41/SR 7 begin a concurrency to the northeast. This intersection also marks the southern terminus of US 41 Bus./SR 7 Bus. The next main intersection is SR 94 (New Statenville Highway). Then, it begins to curve to the north and enters the eastern city limits of Valdosta. Right after a slight bend to the north-northwest is an intersection with US 84/US 221/SR 38 (East Hill Avenue). At this intersection, US 221 joins the concurrency. After a curve to the northwest, the four highways intersect East Park Avenue. Here, US 221/SR 31 split off to the northeast and then leaves the city. The two highways travel through rural areas of the county, traveling southeast of Moody Air Force Base, and enter Lanier County. They continue to the northeast and gradually curve to the north-northeast. Along the eastern shore of Milltown Bay, they begin a northward routing and meet the western terminus of SR 31 Conn. (Murray Boulevard). Approximately 1,500 feet (460 m) later, they enter Lakeland. After a curve to the north-northwest, where SR 135 (South Mill Street) joins the concurrency, they enter the main part of town, where they intersect US 129/SR 11/SR 37/SR 122 (West Main Street). Here, both concurrencies merge and head to the east-northeast. Immediately, SR 135 departs to the north-northwest on North Carter Street. At Oak Street, SR 135 Byp. joins the concurrency. At North College Street, SR 135 Byp. leaves the concurrency to the north-northwest. This intersection also marks the eastern terminus of SR 11 Byp. The other six highways continue to the east-northeast, crossing over Big Creek before leaving town. Then, they cross over the Alapaha River. After that, US 221/SR 31/SR 122 depart the concurrency to the north-northeast. Just under 1 mile (1.6 km) later, SR 122 splits off, and US 221/SR 31 continue to the north-northeast, intersect SR 168, cut across the northwestern corner of Clinch County, and enter Atkinson County. A little over 1 mile (1.6 km) later, SR 64 joins the concurrency. The three highways continue to the north-northeast and intersect US 441/SR 89. At this intersection, SR 89 reaches its northern terminus, and US 441 joins the concurrency. In fact, US 441 is concurrent for over half of SR 31's total length. The concurrency continues into Pearson. There, they intersect US 82/SR 520 (Albany Avenue). At this intersection, SR 64 turns right onto US 82/SR 520. The other three highways continue to the north-northeast through rural areas of the county. Then, they curve to the north-northwest and enter Coffee County. Immediately, they curve to the north and cross the Satilla River. Then, they pass Pine Forests Memorial Gardens and enter Douglas.

=== Douglas to Wrightsville ===
They travel along the eastern edge of Douglas Municipal Airport. Farther to the north is an intersection with SR 135/SR 206 (Bowens Mill Road). At this intersection, SR 206 reaches its eastern terminus, and US 221 departs the concurrency. Farther to the north, they intersect SR 158 (Baker Highway). In the main part of town is an intersection with SR 32. On the northern edge of town is an intersection with SR 206 Conn. (North Connector Road). US 441/SR 31 curve to the northwest and enter Broxton, where SR 268 briefly joins the concurrency. After they leave town, they continue to the northwest and have a short concurrency with SR 107, a few miles south of Jacksonville. At the end of the concurrency, US 319 joins the concurrency. The three highways cross over the Ocmulgee River on the J. H. Millhollin Memorial Bridge, into Telfair County. Then, they curve to the north-northeast. When the concurrency enters Jacksonville, they intersect SR 117. Just before entering McRae, they meet the northern terminus of SR 149 Conn. Then, they enter town and intersect SR 132 on the southern edge of the city limits. Approximately 2,000 feet (610 m) later, US 280/SR 30 join the concurrency. In the central part of town is an intersection with US 23/US 341/SR 27. The five highways curve to the northeast and cross over the Little Ocmulgee River into Wheeler County. On the southeastern edge of Little Ocmulgee State Park, US 319/US 441/SR 31 depart to the north-northwest and skirt along the eastern edge of the park. They cut across a tiny part of Dodge County before entering Laurens County. The concurrent highways have an intersection with SR 46/SR 126. Northeast of Rentz, they have a second intersection with SR 117, which joins the concurrency. They curve to the north-northeast, pass Oconee Fall Line Technical College, and enter Dublin. Immediately is an interchange with I-16 (Jim Gillis Historic Savannah Parkway) and pass the Dublin–Laurens County Recreation Center. At the southern terminus of US 441 Byp., SR 117 departs the concurrency. At Joiner Street is the northern terminus of SR 257. In the central part of town, at an intersection with Martin Luther King, Jr. Drive, the three highways turn to the left onto South Monroe Street. Then, they intersect US 80/SR 19/SR 26 (Bellevue Avenue). At this intersection, the two concurrencies merge to the northeast. At Jefferson Street, US 441 departs to the north-northwest, concurrent with SR 29, which joins the concurrency. Also, SR 19 leaves the concurrency The five highways cross over the Oconee River on the Herschel Lovett Bridge, into East Dublin. In the city, US 319/SR 31 depart to the northeast. They travel through rural areas of the county, have a short section along the Laurens–Johnson county line, and enter Johnson County proper. The concurrency enters Wrightsville and curve to the east to an intersection with SR 15/SR 57/SR 78 (Marcus Street). At this intersection, SR 31 reaches its northern terminus, while US 319 continues to the east, concurrent with SR 78.

=== National Highway System ===
The following portions of SR 31 are part of the National Highway System, a system of routes determined to be the most important for the nation's economy, mobility, and defense:

- From just north of I-75, south of Valdosta, to the northern end of the US 41/SR 7 concurrency in the northeast part of Valdosta
- The entire length of the US 441 concurrency, from just south-southwest of Pearson to Dublin

== History ==
SR 31 was established at least as early as 1919, from SR 38 in Homerville north-northwest to Pearson, and then on current path to SR 32 in Douglas. At this time, part of SR 26 was established in the Dublin area, and part of SR 30 was established in the northeastern part of the McRae area. By the end of September 1921, the Homerville–Pearson segment was decommissioned. SR 15 was extended on SR 26 from Dublin east-northeast to North Dublin, and then north-northeast to Wrightsville. Between October 1929 and June 1930, the southern terminus of SR 31 was extended southwest to US 84/SR 38 east-northeast of Valdosta. Between November 1930 and January 1932, the southern terminus was shifted west-southwest, into Valdosta. US 280 was designated on SR 30 in the McRae area. In January 1932, the northern terminus of SR 31 was extended to McRae. In early 1935, the northern terminus was extended again, to SR 117 south-southwest of Dublin. At the end of 1939, the southern terminus was extended south-southwest to the Florida state line south-southwest of Valdosta. In 1942, the entire path of SR 31 that existed at the time, and what would eventually be designated as part of it, SR 171 in the Dublin area and SR 15 from Dublin to Wrightsville, had a "completed hard surface".

Between January 1945 and November 1946, US 319 was designated on SR 31, from south-southeast of Jacksonville to south-southwest of Dublin; SR 117, from south-southwest of Dublin to that city; US 80/SR 26/SR 29, from Dublin to North Dublin; and SR 15, from North Dublin to Wrightsville. Between February 1948 and April 1949, US 441 was designated on SR 31 from south-southwest of Pearson to Dublin. Between July 1957 and June 1960, the northern terminus of SR 31 was extended north-northeast on US 319/US 441 to Dublin, truncating SR 117; east-northeast on US 80/US 319/SR 26/SR 29 to North Dublin; and on US 319 to Wrightsville, since SR 15 was shifted eastward. In 1989, SR 822 was established from just south of the CSX railroad tracks in Dublin north-northwest to US 80/US 319/SR 26/SR 29/SR 31 (Bellevue Avenue). An unnumbered road was proposed from US 319/US 441/SR 31 (Telfair Street/Jefferson Street) and SR 19 (also part of Jefferson Street) east-northeast to the southern terminus of SR 822. In 1992, the path of SR 31 in Dublin was shifted east-southeastward, off of US 319/US 441/SR 19 and US 80/US 319/SR 26/SR 29, and onto the unnumbered road and replaced SR 822. In 1994, part of Inner Perimeter Road was established from US 41/SR 7 southeast of Valdosta to US 221/SR 31 in the northeast part of the city. In 2006, this road was extended southwest to SR 31. SR 31 and US 41/SR 7 were shifted out of downtown, and onto it. US 221 was also rerouted in the eastern part of the city, onto US 41/SR 7/SR 31 as it currently does.

== Major intersections ==
County	Location	mi	km	Destinations	Notes
Brooks		0.0	0.0	SR 145 south (Northeast Colin Kelly Highway) – Madison	Southern terminus at the Florida state line
Lowndes	Clyattville	4.5	7.2	SR 376 east (Clyattville–Lake Park Road) to I-75 south (SR 401 south) – Lake Park	Western terminus of SR 376
Lowndes		8.8	14.2	I-75 (SR 401) – Valdosta, Macon, Lake City	I-75/SR 401 exit 11
Lowndes		12.6	20.3	US 41 south / SR 7 south / US 41 Bus. north / SR 7 Bus. north – Valdosta, Lake Park	Southern end of US 41/SR 7 concurrency; southern terminus of US 41 Bus./SR 7 Bus.
Lowndes		13.9	22.4	SR 94 east (New Statenville Highway) – Valdosta, Statenville	Western terminus of SR 94
Lowndes	Valdosta	16.6	26.7	US 84 / SR 38 / US 221 south (East Hill Avenue) – Quitman	Southern end of US 221 concurrency
Lowndes	Valdosta	18.5	29.8	US 41 north / SR 7 north (Perimeter Road) to I-75 north (SR 401 north) / Lakeland Highway – Valdosta	Northern end of US 41/SR 7 concurrency
Lanier		32.9	52.9	SR 31 Conn. east (Murray Boulevard)	Western terminus of SR 31 Conn.
Lanier	Lakeland	33.5	53.9	SR 135 south (South Mills Street) – Naylor	Southern end of SR 135 concurrency
Lanier	Lakeland	34.1	54.9	US 129 north / SR 11 north / SR 37 west / SR 122 west (West Main Street) – Ray City, Nashville, Adel, Moultrie, Banks Lake National Wildlife Refuge	Southern end of US 129/SR 11/SR 37 and SR 122 concurrencies
Lanier	Lakeland	34.1	54.9	SR 135 north (North Carter Street) – Willacoochee	Northern pend of SR 135 concurrency
Lanier	Lakeland	34.3	55.2	SR 135 Byp. south (South Oak Street)	Southern end of SR 135 Byp. concurrency
Lanier	Lakeland	34.4	55.4	SR 11 Byp. north / SR 135 Byp. north (North College Street)	Northern end of SR 135 Byp. concurrency; southern terminus of SR 11 Byp.
Lanier		36.7	59.1	US 129 south / SR 11 south / SR 37 east – Homerville, Stockton, Statenville	Northern end of US 129/SR 11/SR 37 concurrency
Lanier		37.7	60.7	SR 122 east – Cogdell, Waycross	Northern end of SR 122 concurrency
Lanier		44.1	71.0	SR 168 – Nashville, Homerville	
Clinch	No major junctions				
Atkinson		49.6	79.8	SR 64 west – Ray City	Southern end of SR 64 concurrency
Atkinson		55.4	89.2	US 441 south / SR 89 south – Homerville	Southern end of US 441 concurrency; northern terminus of SR 89
Atkinson	Pearson	57.3	92.2	US 82 / SR 64 east / SR 520 (Albany Avenue) – Tifton, Waycross	Northern end of SR 64 concurrency
Coffee	Douglas	70.7	113.8	US 221 north / SR 135 / SR 206 west / SR 32 Truck / SR 158 Truck (Bowen Mill Road) – Willacoochee, Fitzgerald, Hazlehurst, General Coffee State Park	Northern end of US 221 concurrency; eastern terminus of SR 206
Coffee	Douglas	71.6	115.2	SR 158 (Baker Highway) – Lax, Waycross, Wiregrass Georgia Tech	
Coffee	Douglas	72.1	116.0	SR 32 east (Ashley Street) – Nicholls, Alma, General Coffee State Park	One-way pair
Coffee	Douglas	72.15	116.11	SR 32 west (Ward Street) – Ocilla	One-way pair
Coffee	Douglas	74.2	119.4	SR 206 Conn. / SR 32 Truck (North Connector Road) to SR 206 / US 221	Truck route to US 221 north/SR 135/SR 158
Coffee	Broxton	80.9	130.2	SR 268 east (Ocmulgee Street East) – Hazlehurst	Southern end of SR 268 concurrency
Coffee	Broxton	81.3	130.8	SR 268 west – Ambrose	Northern end of SR 268 concurrency
Coffee		91.5	147.3	SR 107 east	Southern end of SR 107 concurrency
Coffee		92.8	149.3	US 319 south / SR 107 west	Northern end of SR 107 concurrency; southern end of US 319 concurrency
Ocmulgee River		93.9	151.1	J.H. Millhollin Memorial Bridge	
Telfair	Jacksonville	95.4	153.5	SR 117 – Rhine, Lumber City	
Telfair		111.8	179.9	SR 149 Conn. south	Northern terminus of SR 149 Conn.
Telfair	McRae	112.4	180.9	SR 132 south	Northern terminus of SR 132
Telfair	McRae	112.7	181.4	US 280 west / SR 30 west	Southern end of US 280/SR 30 concurrency
Telfair	McRae	114.1	183.6	US 23 south / US 341 south / SR 27 south (Oak Street)	One-way pair
Telfair	McRae	114.2	183.8	US 23 north / US 341 north / SR 27 north (Railroad Street)	One-way pair
Little Ocmulgee River		115.4	185.7	Unnamed bridge over the Little Ocmulgee River, marking the Telfair–Wheeler county line	
Wheeler		115.7	186.2	US 280 east / SR 30 east	Northern end of US 280/SR 30 concurrency
Dodge	No major junctions				
Laurens		127.7	205.5	SR 46 / SR 126 – Eastman, Cadwell, Soperton, Alamo	
Laurens		140.1	225.5	SR 117 south – Rentz	Southern end of SR 117 concurrency
Laurens	Dublin	144.3	232.2	I-16 (SR 404 / Jim L. Gillis Historic Savannah Parkway) – Macon, Savannah	I-16/SR 404 exit 51
Laurens	Dublin	145.3	233.8	US 441 Byp. north / SR 117 north	Northern end of SR 117 concurrency; southern terminus of US 441 Byp.
Laurens	Dublin	147.6	237.5	SR 257 south (Joiner Street) – Dexter	Northern terminus of SR 257
Laurens	Dublin	148.4	238.8	US 80 west / SR 19 west / SR 26 west (Bellevue Avenue)	Southern end of US 80/SR 19/SR 26 concurrency
Laurens	Dublin	148.6	239.1	US 441 north / SR 29 north / SR 19 south (Jefferson Street)	Northern end of US 441 and SR 19 concurrencies; southern end of SR 29 concurrency
Laurens	Dublin–East Dublin city line	149.3	240.3	Herschel Lovett Bridge over the Oconee River	
Laurens	East Dublin	150.7	242.5	US 80 east / SR 26 east / SR 29 south	Northern end of US 80/SR 26 and SR 29 concurrencies
Laurens–Johnson	No major junctions				
Johnson	Wrightsville	166.9	268.6	US 319 north / SR 15 / SR 57 / SR 78 (Marcus Street) – Wadley, Sandersville, Swainsboro, Adrian	Northern end of US 319 concurrency; northern terminus
1.000 mi = 1.609 km; 1.000 km = 0.621 mi: Concurrency terminus

== Special routes ==
=== Lakeland connector route (1965–1980) ===
State Route 31 Connector
- Location: Lakeland
- Existed: 1965–1980

State Route 31 Connector (SR 31 Conn.) was a short connector route of SR 31 that existed entirely within the city limits of Lakeland. Between June 1963 and January 1966, it was established on US 129/SR 11/SR 37/SR 122 (Main Avenue), from where SR 122 (Main Street) split off of Main Avenue, east-southeast to US 221/SR 31/SR 135 (Mill Street). Between January 1974 and the beginning of 1981, it was decommissioned.

The entire route was in Lakeland, Lanier County.

mi	km	Destinations	Notes
		US 129 north / SR 11 north / SR 37 west (Main Avenue) / SR 122 west (Main Street)	Western end of US 129/SR 11/SR 37/SR 122 concurrency; western terminus
		US 129 south / SR 11 south / SR 37 east / SR 122 east (Main Avenue) / US 221 / SR 31 / SR 135 (Mill Street / Main Avenue)	Eastern end of US 129/SR 11/SR 37/SR 122 concurrency; eastern terminus
1.000 mi = 1.609 km; 1.000 km = 0.621 mi: Concurrency terminus

=== Lakeland connector route ===
State Route 31 Connector
- Location: South of Lakeland
- Length: 0.4 mi (640 m)
- Existed: 2009–present

State Route 31 Connector (SR 31 Conn.) is a 0.4-mile-long (0.64 km) connector route that exists entirely within the southeastern part of Lanier County. It is located just south of Lakeland and is known as Murray Boulevard for its entire length.

It begins at an intersection with US 221/SR 31 (Lakeland Highway). It travels due east to meet its eastern terminus, an intersection with SR 135 (College Street).

SR 31 Conn. is not part of the National Highway System, a system of roadways important to the nation's economy, defense, and mobility.

Between January 1998 and January 2010, it was established on its current path.

The entire route is in Lanier County.

Location	mi	km	Destinations	Notes
	0.0	0.0	US 221 / SR 31 (Lakeland Highway) – Valdosta, Lakeland	Western terminus
	0.4	0.64	SR 135 (College Street) – Naylor, Lakeland	Eastern terminus
1.000 mi = 1.609 km; 1.000 km = 0.621 mi

=== Douglas spur route ===
State Route 31 Spur
- Location: Douglas
- Existed: 1965–1968

State Route 31 Spur (SR 31 Spur) was a short-lived spur route of SR 31 that existed entirely within the city limits of Douglas. Between June 1963 and January 1966, it was established from SR 135 north and east-northeast to US 221/US 441/SR 31. In 1968, it was decommissioned.

The entire route was in Douglas, Coffee County.

mi	km	Destinations	Notes
		SR 135	Southern terminus
		US 221 / US 441 / SR 31	Northern terminus
1.000 mi = 1.609 km; 1.000 km = 0.621 mi
