= Georgia State Route 64 =

State highway in Georgia

State Route 64
- SR 64 highlighted in red

Route information
- Maintained by GDOT
- Length: 45.9 mi (73.9 km)
- Existed: 1926–present

Major junctions
- South end: US 129 / SR 11 / SR 37 in Ray City
- US 221 / SR 31 southwest of Pearson; US 441 / SR 89 near Pearson; US 82 / SR 520 in Pearson
- North end: SR 158 in Wilsonville

Location
- Country: United States
- State: Georgia
- Counties: Berrien, Lanier, Atkinson, Coffee

Highway system
- Georgia State Highway System; Interstate; US; State; Special
← SR 63	→ SR 65

State Route 64 (SR 64) is a 45.9-mile-long (73.9 km) state highway that travels southwest-to-northeast through portions of Berrien, Lanier, Atkinson, and Coffee counties in the south-central part of the U.S. state of Georgia. The highway connects Ray City with Wilsonville, via Pearson.

== Route description ==
SR 64 begins at an intersection with US 129/SR 11/SR 37 in Ray City. It heads to the north-northeast, through rural areas of Berrien County. The highway then enters Lanier County. It begins a concurrency with SR 135 just before crossing back into Berrien County. Less than 2 miles (3.2 km) after crossing the county line, they intersect SR 168. SR 64 and SR 168 travel concurrently to the east. The two highways cross over the Alapaha River back into Lanier County. Less than 2 miles (3.2 km) later, SR 64 then departs from the concurrency to the northeast and travels through rural areas of the county before it enters Atkinson County. A short distance into the county, it intersects US 221/SR 31. The three highways head concurrently to the northeast. Just before entering Pearson, US 441/SR 89 intersect the concurrency, with US 441 joining it. In Pearson, the four highways intersect US 82/SR 520. SR 64 turns to the right onto US 82/SR 520. The three highways have a very brief concurrency to the east-southeast. The road splits off to the northeast and travels along the Atkinson–Coffee county line. A short distance later, it slips back into Atkinson County proper for about 2 miles (3.2 km) and then travels along the county line again. SR 64 heads to the north for a few miles before meeting its northern terminus, an intersection with SR 158 in Wilsonville.

== History ==
=== 1920s and 1930s ===
The roadway that would become SR 64 was established at least as early as 1919 as an unnumbered road from Baxley to a point south of Reidsville and another unnumbered road from this point to that city. By the end of 1921, SR 32 was designated on both of these unnumbered roads. By the end of 1926, the portion of SR 32 on both sides of the Appling–Tattnall county line had a "sand clay or top soil" surface. The decade ended with SR 32 on this segment being redesignated as SR 64. By the middle of 1930, SR 31 south of Pearson was shifted west to its current path. Two years later, the portion of highway that straddled the Appling–Tattnall county line was under construction. Another two years later, a portion of SR 31 just south of Pearson had completed grading, but was not surfaced. At the end of the year, a portion of SR 64 in Baxley had a sand clay or top soil surface. In the first half of 1936, a portion of SR 31 south-southwest of Pearson had completed grading, but was not surfaced. Later that year, this portion was under construction. By mid-1939, SR 64 was designated on a segment from Pearson to Alma. However, there was no indication if it connected to the original segment via a concurrency with US 1/SR 4 between Alma and Baxley. Later that year, the original segment was shifted southeast to end in Glennville.

=== 1940s ===
In 1940, the segment of SR 64 from Baxley to just southwest of the Appling–Tattnall county line was shifted south-southeast. This segment then traveled from SR 121 south-southwest of Surrency to Glennville. At the end of the year, the highway was extended from Pearson to Ray City. SR 144 was extended west-southwest of Glennville to Baxley on the former path of SR 64. This extension truncated SR 64 to just southwest of the Appling–Tattnall county line. The next year, the Ray City–Alma segment was indicated to be "on system–not marked or maintained". By the end of 1946, SR 64 was extended on a concurrency with SR 144 to a point west-southwest of Glennville, then on its own to SR 23 southeast of Reidsville. This essentially re-established the original segment of the highway. SR 64 was also indicated to be "projected mileage" from US 25/SR 73 south of Claxton to US 280/SR 30 east-southeast of Daisy. By the middle of 1948, two small portions of the highway in the northwestern part of Ware County had a sand clay, top soil, or stabilized earth surface. The portion between these had completed grading, but was not surfaced. The entire SR 144 concurrency had a sand clay, top soil, or stabilized earth surface. The southern part of the eastern segment south of Claxton had completed grading, but was not surfaced. By the middle of next year, the entire Tattnall County portion of the SR 144 concurrency was hard surfaced.

=== 1950s ===
By the middle of 1950, a portion of the central segment north-northeast of Surrency was hard surfaced. By the end of 1951, nearly the entire Ware County portion was indicated to be "projected mileage". A portion south-southwest of the south end of the SR 144 concurrency had completed grading, but was not surfaced. The portion that straddled the SR 250 intersection had a sand clay, topsoil, or stabilized earth surface. In 1953, nearly the entire central segment south of Surrency, the portion from the north end of the SR 144 concurrency to southeast of Reidsville, and the entire Tattnall County portion of the eastern segment, had completed grading, but was not surfaced, while the northern end was hard surfaced. From Surrency to the south end of the SR 144 concurrency was also hard surfaced. The northern terminus of the eastern segment was shifted west to end in Daisy. By the middle of 1954, the entire SR 168 concurrency had completed grading, but was not surfaced. A portion of the highway southwest of Alma was indicated to be projected mileage. A year later, the entire central segment south of Surrency, as well as the entire portion north of the SR 144 concurrency, was hard surfaced. By the middle of 1957, the entire SR 168 concurrency, a small portion north of the Clinch–Atkinson county line, and nearly the entire Bacon County portion of the Pearson–Alma segment, were hard surfaced. SR 250 was relocated to the northwest, replacing the entire eastern segment of SR 64.

=== 1960s to 1980s ===
By the end of 1960, from the north end of the SR 168 concurrency to just north of the Clinch–Atkinson county line, a portion southwest of Pearson, and nearly the entire Coffee County portion of the Pearson–Alma segment, were hard surfaced. Between 1960 and 1963, the segment from Ray City to the SR 135 intersection north-northwest of Lakeland and a portion northeast of Pearson were paved. A segment from the SR 135 intersection to the south end of the SR 168 concurrency, a portion north of the Clinch–Atkinson county line, and a portion on the Atkinson–Coffee county line had a "topsoil or gravel, unpaved" surface. SR 121 was shifted eastward, replacing the central segment of the highway. In 1972, the segment of the highway from the north end of the SR 168 concurrency to Pearson was shifted eastward to travel concurrently with US 221/SR 31 into the city. In 1976, all of the highway from Pearson to SR 158 was hard surfaced. By March 1980, the portion between the SR 135 intersection and the south end of the SR 168 concurrency was shifted to the northwest to form a concurrency with SR 135 to an intersection with SR 168, and then on a longer concurrency with that highway to resume its previous departure. Later that year, the northern terminus was truncated to the SR 158 intersection.

== Major intersections ==
County	Location	mi	km	Destinations	Notes
Berrien	Ray City	0.0	0.0	US 129 / SR 11 / SR 37 (Main Street) – Lakeland, Nashville, Adel	Southern terminus
Lanier		8.8	14.2	SR 135 south / Deerwood Road east – Lakeland	Southern end of SR 135 concurrency; western terminus of Deerwood Road
Berrien		10.4	16.7	SR 135 north / SR 168 west – Willacoochee, Nashville	Southern end of SR 135 concurrency; northern end of SR 168 concurrency
Lanier		14.7	23.7	SR 168 east – Homerville	Northern end of SR 168 concurrency
Atkinson		22.1	35.6	US 221 south / SR 31 south	Southern end of US 221/SR 31 concurrency
Atkinson		27.9	44.9	US 441 south (SR 89 south) – Homerville	Southern end of US 441 concurrency; northern terminus of SR 89
Atkinson	Pearson	29.8	48.0	US 221 north / US 441 north / SR 31 north (Main Street) – Douglas, General Coffee State Park US 82 west / SR 520 west (Albany Avenue) – Tifton	Northern end of US 221/SR 31 and US 441 concurrencies; southern end of US 82/SR 520 concurrency
Atkinson	Pearson	29.9	48.1	US 82 east / SR 520 east (Albany Avenue) – Waycross	Northern end of US 82/SR 520 concurrency
Coffee	Wilsonville	45.9	73.9	SR 158 (East Baker Highway) / Andrew Tanner Road north – Douglas, Waycross	Northern terminus of SR 64; southern terminus of Andrew Tanner Road
1.000 mi = 1.609 km; 1.000 km = 0.621 mi: Concurrency terminus
