= Georgia State Route 135 =

State highway in Georgia, United States

State Route 135
- Georgia State Route 135 highlighted in red

Route information
- Maintained by GDOT
- Length: 129.36 mi (208.18 km)

Major junctions
- South end: CR 141 at the Florida state line near Jennings, Florida
- US 84 / SR 38 in Naylor; US 221 / SR 31 in Lakeland; US 129 / SR 11 / SR 37 / SR 122 in Lakeland; US 82 / SR 520 in Willacoochee; US 221 / US 441 / SR 31 in Douglas; US 23 / US 341 / SR 27 in Hazlehurst; US 221 / SR 56 in Uvalda
- North end: US 280 / SR 15 / SR 29 / SR 30 in Higgston

Location
- Country: United States
- State: Georgia
- Counties: Echols, Lanier, Lowndes, Berrien, Atkinson, Coffee, Jeff Davis, Montgomery

Highway system
- Georgia State Highway System; Interstate; US; State; Special
← SR 134	→ SR 136

State Route 135 (SR 135) is a 129.36-mile-long (208.18 km) state highway in the south-central part of the U.S. state of Georgia. It connects the Florida state line with Higgston, via Lakeland, Willacoochee, Douglas, and Hazlehurst. It travels concurrently with U.S. Route 221 for extensive distances, a short piece in Lakeland and a longer one from Douglas to Uvalda.

== Route description ==
SR 135 begins at the Florida state line intersecting with County Road 141 (CR 141) south. In Echols County it intersects SR 94, and SR 376. SR 135 enters Lowndes County east of Valdosta. The only major junction in the county is with US 84/SR 38. SR 135 then enters Lanier County south of Stoctkon. In downtown, it travels concurrently with US 221/SR 31 for a short distance. North of Lakeland, it travels concurrently with SR 64. SR 135 enters southeast of Nashville. Just north of the county line, SR 64 splits off and joins SR 168. SR 135 also intersects SR 76, which terminates at SR 135. SR 135 enters Atkinson County south of Willacoochee. In Willacoochee, it travels concurrently for a short distance with US 82 and SR 520. SR 135 enters Coffee County south of Douglas, where it also travels parallel to a former Central of Georgia Railway right-of-way. In Douglas, it travels concurrently with SR 206 before the latter terminates. At the terminus, SR 135 travels concurrently with US 221 again. Together, they intersect SR 32, SR 158, and SR 206 Conn. before leaving Douglas. SR 135 enters Jeff Davis County southwest of Hazlehurst. It intersects SR 107 just north of Denton; SR 107 terminates at SR 135. In Hazlehurst, US 221 splits off for a short way, while SR 135 picks up SR 135 Conn. SR 135 then picks US 221 back up, heading north. They then travel concurrently with US 23, US 341, SR 19, and SR 27. After intersecting SR 19 Conn, these roads split off. SR 135 enters Montgomery County south of Uvalda. In Uvalda, US 221 splits off at an intersection with SR 56. North of Uvalda, SR 135 intersects SR 130. In Higgston, SR 135 terminates at US 280, SR 15, SR 29, and SR 30.

== Major intersections ==
County	Location	mi	km	Destinations	Notes
Echols		0.000	0.000	CR 141 south – Jennings	Southern terminus; continuation into Florida
Echols		7.340	11.813	SR 376 west – Lake Park	Eastern terminus of SR 376
Echols		7.596	12.225	SR 94 – Valdosta, Statenville	
Lowndes	Naylor	22.148	35.644	US 84 / SR 38 – Valdosta, Homerville	
Lanier		29.533	47.529	SR 135 Loop north (Burnt Church Road)	Southern terminus of unsigned SR 135 Loop
Lanier		30.256	48.692	SR 31 Conn. west	Eastern terminus of SR 31 Conn.
Lanier		30.342	48.831	SR 135 Byp. north	Southern terminus of SR 135 Byp.
Lanier		30.498	49.082	SR 135 Loop south (Burnt Church Road)	Northern terminus of unsigned SR 135 Loop
Lanier	Lakeland	31.064	49.993	US 221 south / SR 31 south (South Valdosta Road) – Valdosta	South end of US 221/SR 31 concurrency
Lanier	Lakeland	31.637	50.915	US 129 north / SR 11 north / SR 37 west / SR 122 west (West Main Street) – Ray City, Banks Lake National Wildlife Refuge	South end of US 129/SR 11/SR 37/SR 122 concurrency
Lanier	Lakeland	31.651	50.937	US 129 south / US 221 north / SR 11 south / SR 31 north / SR 37 east / SR 122 east (West Main Street) – Statenville, Douglas, Pearson	North end of US 129/SR 11/SR 37/SR 122 and US 221/SR 31 concurrencies
Lanier	Lakeland	31.711	51.034	SR 11 Byp. north (West Church Avenue)	South end of SR 11 Byp. concurrency
Lanier	Lakeland	31.788	51.158	SR 11 Byp. south (West Church Avenue)	North end of SR 11 Byp. concurrency
Lanier	Lakeland	32.112	51.679	SR 135 Byp. south	Northern terminus of SR 135 Byp.
Lanier		38.725	62.322	SR 64 west – Ray City	South end of SR 64 concurrency
Berrien		40.319	64.887	SR 64 east / SR 168 – Nashville, Pearson, Homerville	North end of SR 64 concurrency
Berrien		45.477	73.188	SR 76 west – Nashville, Adel	Eastern terminus of SR 76
Atkinson	Willacoochee	53.052	85.379	US 82 west / SR 520 west (Main Street) – Alapaha, Tifton	South end of US 82/SR 520 concurrency
Atkinson	Willacoochee	53.781	86.552	US 82 east / SR 520 east – Pearson	North end of US 82/SR 520 concurrency
Coffee	Douglas	69.699	112.170	SR 206 west / SR 32 Truck west / SR 158 Truck west (Bowens Mill Road) – Fitzgerald	South end of SR 206/SR 32 Truck/SR 158 Truck concurrency
Coffee	Douglas	70.576	113.581	US 221 south / US 441 / SR 31 (Peterson Avenue) / SR 206 ends – Douglas, Pearson, South Georgia College, Airport	North end of SR 206 concurrency; south end of US 221 concurrency
Coffee	Douglas	71.707	115.401	SR 158 (East Baker Highway) / SR 158 Truck ends – Douglas, Waycross	North end of SR 158 Truck concurrency; northern terminus of SR 158 Truck
Coffee	Douglas	72.653	116.924	SR 32 east (Ward Street) / SR 32 Truck ends – Alma, General Coffee State Park	North end of SR 32 Truck concurrency; northern terminus of SR 32 Truck; south end of SR 32 concurrency
Coffee	Douglas	72.798	117.157	SR 32 west (Hazlehurst Highway) – Douglas	North end of SR 32 concurrency
Coffee		75.151	120.944	SR 206 Conn. west (North Connector Road) to US 441 / SR 31	Eastern terminus of SR 206 Conn.
Jeff Davis		93.058	149.762	SR 107 west (McRae Highway) – Snipesville	Eastern terminus of SR 107
Jeff Davis	Hazlehurst	101.658	163.603	SR 135 Conn. south / US 221 Truck north / SR 135 Truck north (Jefferson Street) to US 23 south / SR 19 south – Alma	Northern terminus of SR 135 Conn.; southern terminus of US 221 Truck/SR 135 Truck
Jeff Davis	Hazlehurst	102.557	165.049	US 23 south / US 341 south / SR 19 south / SR 27 south (Jarman Street) – Baxley	South end of US 23/US 341/SR 19/SR 27 concurrency (northbound only)
Jeff Davis	Hazlehurst	102.627	165.162	SR 19 Conn. south (East Coffee Street) – Douglas	Northern terminus of SR 19 Conn.; connects the two directions of US 221/SR 135
Jeff Davis	Hazlehurst	102.790	165.424	US 23 north / US 341 north / SR 19 north / SR 27 north (Coffee Street) – McRae	North end of US 23/US 341/SR 19/SR 27 concurrency (northbound only)
Montgomery	Uvalda	116.157	186.937	US 221 north / SR 56 (Main Street) – Mount Vernon, Reidsville	North end of US 221 concurrency
Montgomery		124.856	200.936	SR 130 north – Vidalia	Southern terminus of SR 130
Montgomery	Higgston	129.356	208.178	US 280 / SR 15 (James Street) / SR 29 / SR 30 – Tarrytown, Soperton, Mount Vernon, Vidalia	Northern terminus
1.000 mi = 1.609 km; 1.000 km = 0.621 mi: Concurrency terminus

== Special routes ==
=== Lakeland loop route ===
State Route 135 Loop
- Location: South of Lakeland
- Length: 2.5 mi (4.0 km)

State Route 135 Loop (SR 135 Loop) is a 2.5-mile-long (4.0 km) unsigned loop route south of the city limits of Lakeland, consisting entirely of Burnt Church Road. It begins at an intersection with SR 135 south of Darsey Pond, then curves to the northeast. At Union Church and the cemetery across the street from it, the road begins to curve to the northwest and then travels to the west just south of the Lakeland city limits. The highway intersects SR 135 Byp. (South Oak Street) before finally terminating at another intersection with the SR 135 mainline (South Mill Street). Burnt Church Road continues to the west as an unnumbered street leading to US 221.

The entire route is in Lanier County.

Location	mi	km	Destinations	Notes
	0.0	0.0	SR 135 – Statenville	Southern terminus
	2.5	4.0	SR 135 Byp. (South Oak Street) – Lakeland	
	2.5	4.0	SR 135 (South Mill Street) – Lakeland	Northern terminus
1.000 mi = 1.609 km; 1.000 km = 0.621 mi

=== Lakeland bypass route ===
State Route 135 Bypass
- Location: Lakeland
- Length: 1.60 mi (2.57 km)

State Route 135 Bypass (SR 135 Byp.) is a 1.60-mile-long (2.57 km) bypass route of SR 135 that is mostly within the city limits of Lakeland. It begins at an intersection with the SR 135 mainline just south of the Lakeland city limits, then intersects SR 135 Loop (only signed as Burnt Church Road) before entering the city. SR 135 Byp. intersects US 129/US 221/SR 11/SR 31/SR 37/SR 122 (Main Street) and travels concurrently with them for two blocks, then turns north onto North College Street in a one-block concurrency with SR 11 Byp., which turns left at East Church Avenue. SR 135 Byp. ends at another intersection with the SR 135 mainline near the Charles Knight Cemetery.

The entire route is in Lanier County.

Location	mi	km	Destinations	Notes
	0.000	0.000	SR 135 – Statenville	Southern terminus
	0.146	0.235	SR 135 Loop (Burnt Church Road)	Unsigned highway
Lakeland	1.237	1.991	US 129 north / US 221 south / SR 11 north / SR 31 south / SR 37 west / SR 122 west (Main Street) – Ray City, Valdosta, Hahira	South end of US 129/US 221/SR 11/SR 31/SR 37/SR 122 concurrency
Lakeland	1.321	2.126	US 129 north / US 221 north / SR 11 south / SR 31 north / SR 37 east / SR 122 east (East Main Street) / SR 11 Byp. begins – Statenville, Pearson, Homerville, Waycross	North end of US 129/US 221/SR 11/SR 31/SR 37/SR 122 concurrency; eastern terminus of SR 11 Byp.; south end of SR 11 Byp. concurrency
Lakeland	1.377	2.216	SR 11 Byp. west (East Church Avenue)	North end of SR 11 Byp. concurrency
Lakeland	1.596	2.569	SR 135 (North Brantley Street) – Willacoochee	Northern terminus
1.000 mi = 1.609 km; 1.000 km = 0.621 mi: Concurrency terminus

=== Hazlehurst connector route ===
State Route 135 Connector
- Location: Hazlehurst
- Length: 0.73 mi (1,170 m)

State Route 135 Connector (SR 135 Conn.) is a 0.73-mile-long (1.17 km) connecting route of SR 135 that exists mostly within the city limits of Hazlehurst. It connects US 23/SR 19 (Alma Highway/Larry Contos Boulevard) with US 221/SR 135 (Jefferson Street/Cromartie Street). It consists of a southern part of Jefferson Street. The highway is entirely concurrent with US 221 Truck / SR 135 Truck.

The entire route is in Jeff Davis County.

Location	mi	km	Destinations	Notes
	0.000	0.000	US 23 / SR 19 / US 221 Truck north / SR 135 Truck north (Alma Highway/Larry Contos Boulevard) – McRae, Baxley, Alma, Waycross	Southern terminus; south end of US 221 Truck/SR 135 Truck concurrency
Hazlehurst	0.731	1.176	US 221 / SR 135 (Jefferson Street/Cromartie Street) / US 221 Truck ends / SR 135 Truck ends – Douglas, McRae, Lumber City, Baxley	Northern terminus; north end of US 221 Truck/SR 135 Truck concurrency; southern terminus of US 221 Truck/SR 135 Truck
1.000 mi = 1.609 km; 1.000 km = 0.621 mi: Concurrency terminus

=== Hazlehurst truck route ===
State Route 135 Truck
- Location: Hazlehurst
- Length: 2.0 mi (3.2 km)

State Route 135 Truck (SR 135 Truck) is a 2.0-mile-long (3.2 km) truck route of SR 135 that exists mostly within the city limits of Hazlehurst. It is entirely concurrent with US 221 Truck. It begins at an intersection with US 221/SR 135 (Jefferson Street/Cromartie Street). It travels to the southeast on Jefferson Street, concurrent with US 221 Truck and SR 135 Conn., which both begin at this intersection, as well. The three highways cross over some railroad tracks of Norfolk Southern Railway (NS) and then leave the city limits. They intersect US 23/SR 19 (Alma Highway). Here, SR 135 meets its southern terminus, and US 221 Truck and SR 135 Truck turn left onto US 23/SR 19 onto Larry Contos Boulevard. The four highways travel to the north-northeast. Just before passing a Walmart Supercenter, they re-enter Hazlehurst. They cross over some railroad tracks of NS Railway and then intersect US 341/SR 27 (Golden Isles Parkway). Here, all six highways travel to the northwest. At Plum Street, the concurrency intersects the northbound lanes of US 221/SR 135 (since those highways travel through the city on one-way streets). At this intersection, US 221 Truck and SR 135 Truck meet their northern terminus.

The entire route is in Jeff Davis County.

Location	mi	km	Destinations	Notes
Hazlehurst	0.0	0.0	US 221 / SR 135 (Jefferson Street/Cromartie Street) / US 221 Truck begins / SR 135 Conn. begins – Douglas, McRae, Lumber City, Baxley	Southern terminus of US 221 Truck/SR 135 Truck; northern terminus of SR 135 Conn.; south end of US 221 Truck and SR 135 Conn. concurrencies
	0.7	1.1	US 23 south / SR 19 south (Alma Highway) / SR 135 Conn. ends – Alma, Waycross	Southern terminus of SR 135 Conn.; south end of US 23/SR 19 concurrency
Hazlehurst	1.6	2.6	US 341 south / SR 27 south (Golden Isles Parkway) – Baxley	South end of US 341/SR 27 concurrency
Hazlehurst	2.0	3.2	US 221 / SR 135 (Plum Street) / US 23 north / US 341 north / SR 19 north / SR 27 north (Jarman Street)	Northern terminus of US 221 Truck/SR 135 Truck; north end of US 23/SR 19, US 221 Truck, and US 341/SR 27 concurrencies; northbound lanes of US 221/SR 135
1.000 mi = 1.609 km; 1.000 km = 0.621 mi: Concurrency terminus
