= Georgia State Route 76 =

State highway in Georgia, United States

State Route 76
- SR 76 highlighted in red

Route information
- Maintained by GDOT
- Length: 62.20 mi (100.10 km)

Major junctions
- South end: US 221 / SR 55 at the Florida state line near Quitman
- US 84 / SR 38 in Quitman; US 84 / US 221 / SR 38 in Quitman; US 41 / SR 7 in Adel; US 129 / SR 11 / SR 125 in Nashville
- North end: SR 135 near Willacoochee

Location
- Country: United States
- State: Georgia
- Counties: Brooks, Cook, Berrien

Highway system
- Georgia State Highway System; Interstate; US; State; Special
← US 76	→ SR 77

State Route 76 (SR 76) is a 62.20-mile-long (100.10 km) state highway in the southern part of the U.S. state of Georgia. It connects the Florida state line, south-southwest of Quitman, with the Nashville area, via Quitman, Morven, and Adel.

== Route description ==
Starting at the Florida line south of Quitman in Brooks County, SR 76 heads north concurrent with U.S. Route 221 (US 221). Just south of Quitman, both roads merge with SR 333. In downtown Quitman, US 221 heads east, and SR 76/SR 333 stays concurrent. Just north of downtown, SR 76 splits off from SR 333. It then passes through the towns of Morven and Barney before entering Cook County.

SR 76 enters Cook County southwest of Adel. In town, it crosses, but does not junction with, Interstate 75 (I-75). In downtown, SR 76 runs concurrent with SR 37. They split east of Adel, and SR 76 heads northeast into Berrien County.

SR 76 enters Berrien County southwest of Nashville. Reaching downtown Nashville, it runs concurrently with US 129, SR 11, and SR 125 for a short distance. After splitting off, SR 76 heads east, jogs north, and then heads east until it terminates at SR 135.

The only portion of SR 76 that is part of the National Highway System, a system of routes determined to be the most important for the nation's economy, mobility, and defense, is the concurrency with US 84/SR 38 (on US 221/SR 333) in Quitman.

== Major intersections ==
County	Location	mi	km	Destinations	Notes
Brooks		0.000	0.000	US 221 south (SR 55) – Greenville, Perry	Southern terminus at the Florida state line; southern end of US 221 concurrency
Brooks	Quitman	10.057	16.185	SR 333 south – Madison	Southern end of SR 333 concurrency
Brooks	Quitman	10.914	17.564	US 84 west / SR 38 west (West Screven Street) – Thomasville, Cairo	Southern end of US 84/SR 38 concurrency
Brooks	Quitman	11.074	17.822	US 84 east / US 221 north / SR 38 east (East Screven Street) – Valdosta, Lakeland, Homerville, Waycross	Northern end of US 84/SR 38 and US 221 concurrencies
Brooks	Quitman	11.953	19.236	SR 333 north (North Washington Street) to SR 133 – Moultrie	Northern end of SR 333 concurrency
Brooks	Morven	23.537	37.879	SR 133 – Moultrie, Valdosta	
Brooks	Barney	28.007	45.073	SR 122 – Pavo, Hahira	
Cook	Adel	38.183	61.450	SR 37 west (West 4th Street) to I-75 – Moultrie	Southern end of SR 37 concurrency
Cook	Adel	38.781	62.412	US 41 / SR 7 (Hutchinson Avenue) – Tifton, Valdosta	
Cook		40.699	65.499	SR 37 east – Ray City, Lakeland, Moody AFB	Northern end of SR 37 concurrency
Berrien	Nashville	50.939	81.978	US 129 south / SR 11 south / SR 125 south (Davis Street) – Ray City, Lakeland, Valdosta	Southern end of US 129/SR 11/SR 125 concurrency
Berrien	Nashville	51.412	82.740	SR 168 east (McPherson Avenue) – Homerville	Western terminus of SR 168
Berrien	Nashville	51.521	82.915	US 129 north / SR 11 north (Davis Street) / SR 125 north (West Marion Avenue) – Alapaha, Ocilla, Tifton	Northern end of US 129/SR 11/SR 125 concurrency
Berrien		62.201	100.103	SR 135 – Willacoochee, Douglas, Lakeland	Northern terminus
1.000 mi = 1.609 km; 1.000 km = 0.621 mi: Concurrency terminus
