= Hartsfield, Georgia =

Unincorporated community in Georgia, US

- Unincorporated community
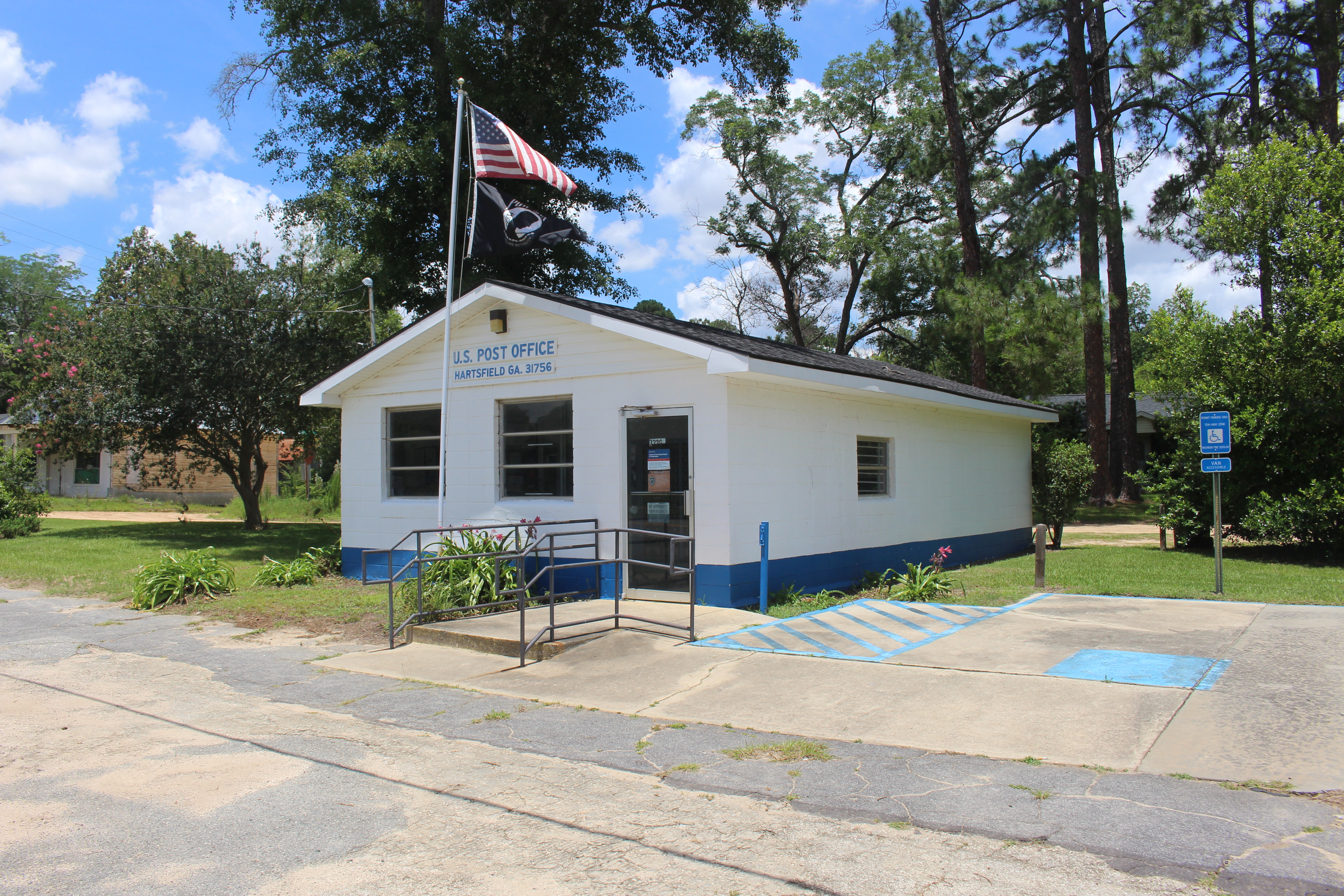
- Hartfield Post Office

- Location within Georgia
- Coordinates: 31°13′01″N 83°58′34″W
- Country: United States
- State: Georgia
- County: Colquitt
- Elevation: 344 ft (105 m)
- Time zone: UTC-5 (Eastern (EST))
  - Summer (DST): UTC-4 (EDT)
- ZIP code: 31756
- Area code: 229
- GNIS feature ID: 331923

Hartsfield is an unincorporated community in Colquitt County, Georgia, United States. The community is located on Georgia State Route 37, 11.4 miles (18.3 km) west-northwest of Moultrie. Hartsfield has a post office with ZIP code 31756, which opened on April 21, 1875.

The community was named after John L. Hartsfield, the proprietor of a local sawmill.
