= Suttons Corner, Georgia =

Unincorporated community in Georgia, U.S.

Coordinates: 31°36′03″N 84°50′39″W

Suttons Corner is an unincorporated community in Clay County, in the U.S. state of Georgia.

== History ==
Suttons Corner was founded by Warren Sutton, and named for him. Suttons Corner Museum in Fort Gaines contains relics of the history of Suttons Corner.

== Geography ==
Suttons Corner is located in the eastern part of Clay County, and is served by U.S. Route 27 and Georgia State Route 37.
