= Georgia State Route 168 =

State highway in Georgia, United States

State Route 168
- SR 168 highlighted in red

Route information
- Maintained by GDOT
- Length: 28.3 mi (45.5 km)

Major junctions
- West end: US 129 / SR 11 / SR 76 / SR 125 in Nashville
- SR 122 west-northwest of Homerville
- East end: SR 37 west of Homerville

Location
- Country: United States
- State: Georgia
- Counties: Berrien, Lanier, Clinch

Highway system
- Georgia State Highway System; Interstate; US; State; Special
← SR 167	→ SR 169

State Route 168 (SR 168) is a state highway that runs west–east through portions of Berrien, Lanier, and Clinch counties in the south-central part of the U.S. state of Georgia.

== Route description ==
The route begins at an intersection with US 129/SR 11/SR 76/SR 125 in Nashville. It heads southeast to an intersection with SR 64/SR 135 north of Lakeland, where SR 64 begins a concurrency to the east. Farther to the east, SR 64 leaves the concurrency to the northeast. Northwest of its eastern terminus is an intersection with US 221/SR 31. The highway continues to the southeast until it meets its eastern terminus, an intersection with SR 37 west of Homerville.

== Major intersections ==
County	Location	mi	km	Destinations	Notes
Berrien	Nashville	0.0	0.0	US 129 / SR 11 / SR 76 / SR 125 (South Davis Street)	Western terminus
Berrien		10.2	16.4	SR 64 / SR 135 – Lakeland, Willacoochee	Western end of SR 64 concurrency
Lanier		14.6	23.5	SR 64 – Pearson	Eastern end of SR 64 concurrency
Lanier		17.5	28.2	US 221 / SR 31 – Lakeland, Pearson	
Clinch		20.9	33.6	SR 122 west – Lakeland	Western end of SR 122 concurrency
Clinch		21.1	34.0	SR 122 east – Waycross	Eastern end of SR 122 concurrency
Clinch		28.3	45.5	SR 37 – Lakeland, Homerville	Eastern terminus
1.000 mi = 1.609 km; 1.000 km = 0.621 mi: Concurrency terminus
