= Alapaha River =

River in Georgia and Florida, United States

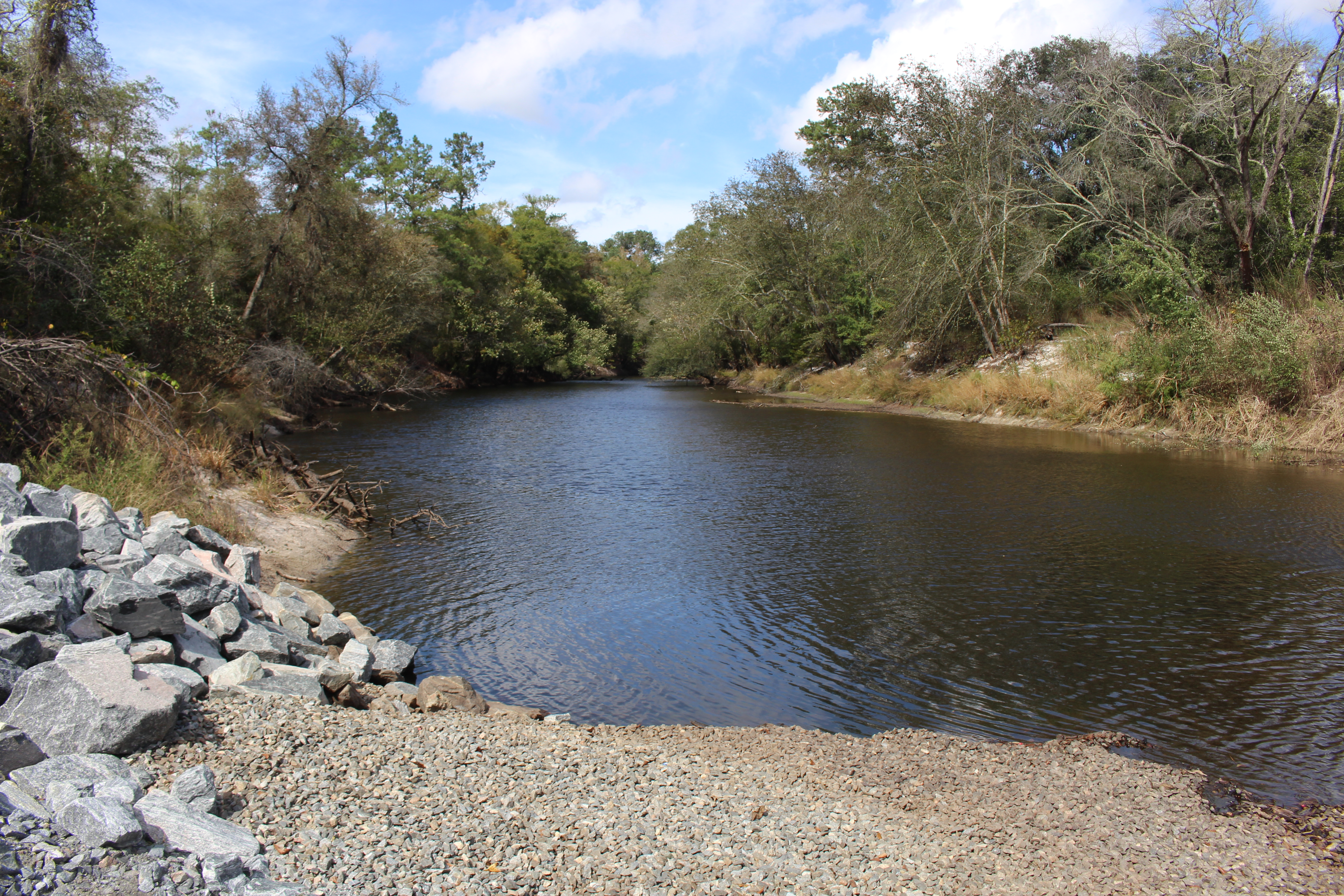
The Alapaha River looking north from Naylor Landing

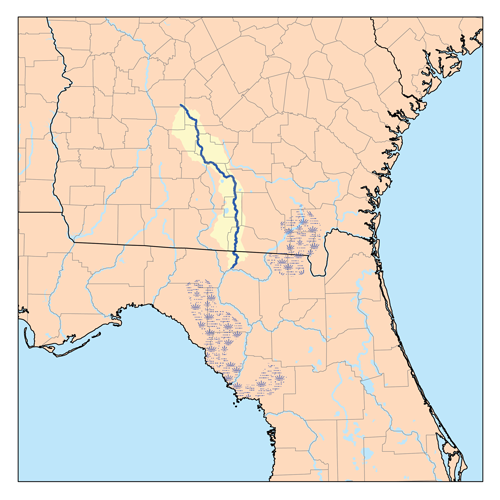

The Alapaha River /əˈlæpəhɑː/ is a 202-mile-long (325 km) river in southern Georgia and northern Florida in the United States. It is a tributary of the Suwannee River, which flows to the Gulf of Mexico.

== History ==
The Hernando de Soto expedition narrative records mention a "Yupaha" village they encountered after they left Apalachee, "the sound of which is suggestive of the Alapaha, a tributary of the Suwanee." Another reference to a village of "Atapaha" "so closely resembles Alapaha that it is reasonable to suppose they are the same, and that the town was on the river of that name." John Reed Swanton's landmark Indian Tribes of North America places the Indian village of Alapaha near where the Alapaha River met the Suwanee, and also noted that an Indian village of "Arapaja" was 70 leagues from St. Augustine, Florida, probably on the Alapaha River. The Spanish mission of Santa María de Los Angeles de Arapaha was located along the lower reaches of the river from before 1630 until 1656.

In the 1840s a German travel writer, Friedrich Gerstäcker wrote a dime novel called Alapaha, or the Renegades of the Border, giving the name to a noble Cherokee "squaw." A translation of this novel was published in the 1870s as #67 in a series of American narratives published by Beadle.

During the American Civil War, the swamps along the Alapaha River in Berrien, Irwin, and Echols counties became a refuge for a number of gangs of Confederate deserters.

== Course ==
The Alapaha River rises in southeastern Dooly County, Georgia, and flows generally southeastwardly through or along the boundaries of Crisp, Wilcox, Turner, Ben Hill, Irwin, Tift, Berrien, Atkinson, Lanier, Lowndes and Echols Counties in Georgia, and Hamilton County in Florida, where it flows into the Suwannee River 10 miles (16 km) southwest of Jasper. Along its course it passes the Georgia towns of Pitts, Rebecca, Alapaha, Willacoochee, Lakeland, and Statenville.

Near Willacoochee, Georgia, the Alapaha collects the Willacoochee River. In Florida, it collects the Alapahoochee River and the short Little Alapaha River, which rises in Echols County, Georgia, and flows southwestward.

== Intermittent river ==
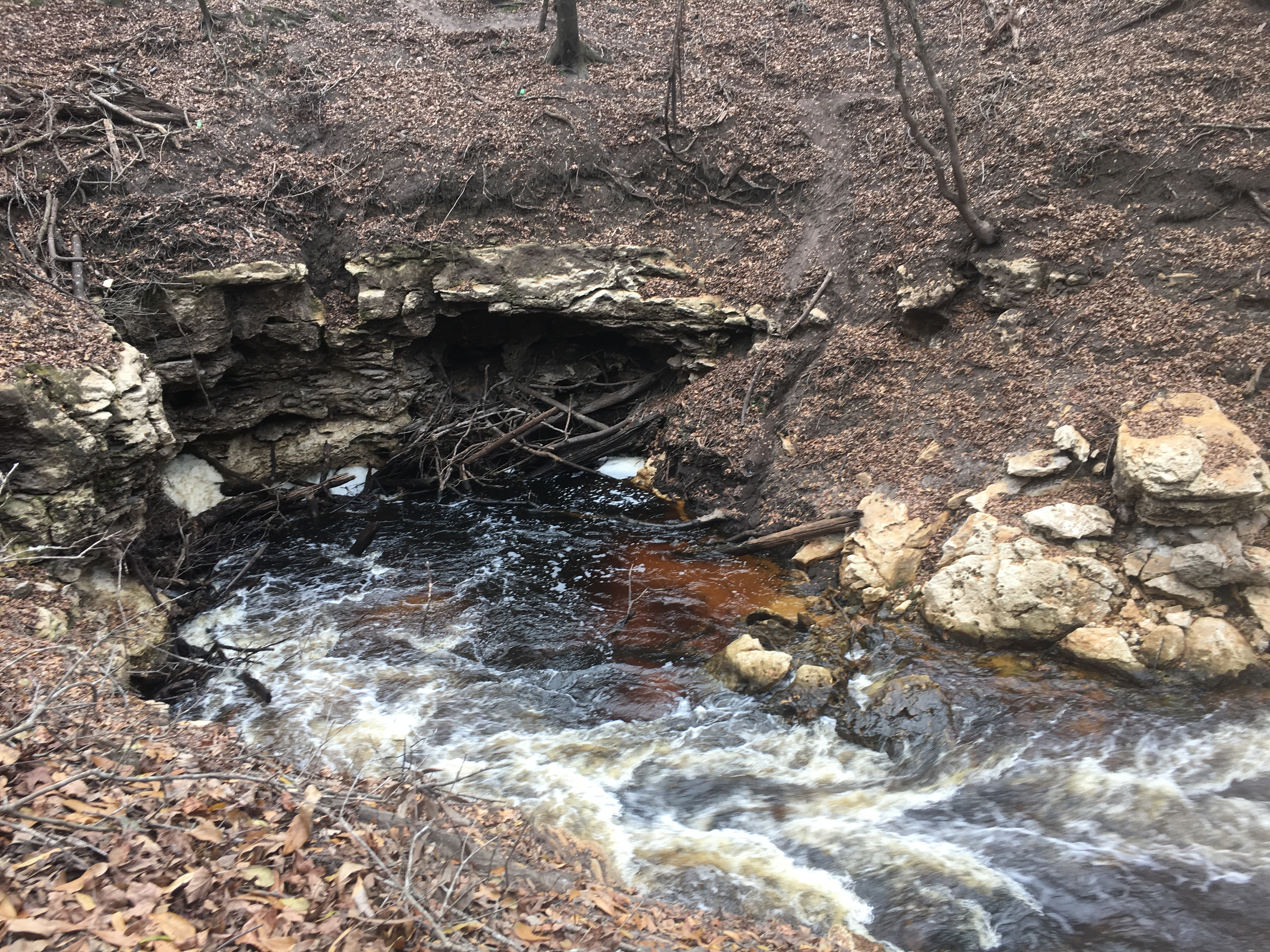
The Dead River Sink

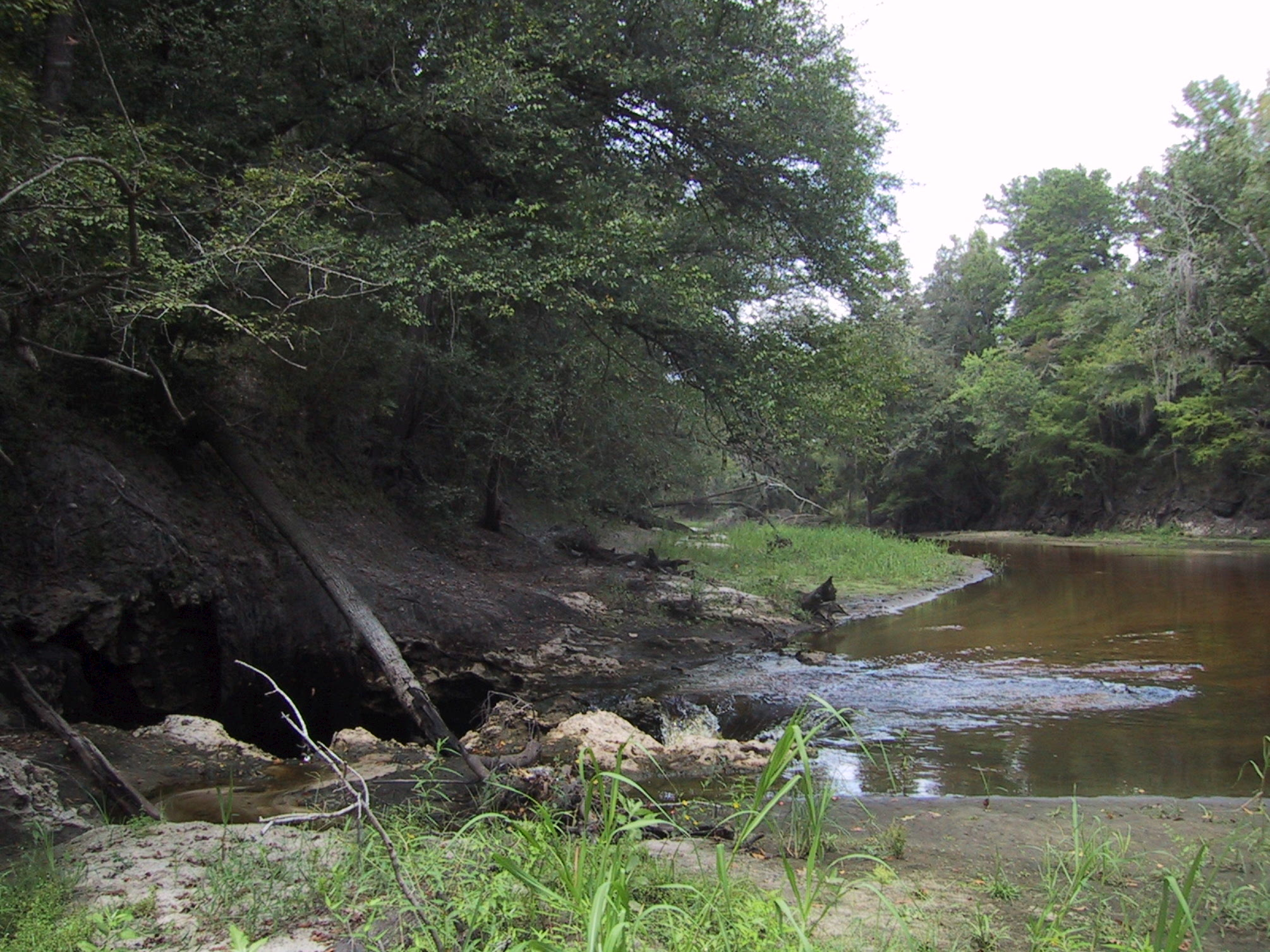
Image of the entire surface water flow of the Alapaha River near Jennings, Florida going into a sinkhole leading to the Floridan aquifer groundwater.

The Alapaha River is an intermittent river for part of its course. During periods of low volume, the river disappears underground and becomes a subterranean river. At approximately 2.3 miles (3.7 km) downstream from Jennings, Florida the Dead River enters the Alapaha River. It is a usually dry river bed with a number of sinkholes, including the Dead River Sink. During periods of low water flow, the Alapaha River downstream from the confluence of the Dead River and the Alapaha River flows upstream into the Dead River.

A few more miles downstream is a second sinkhole variously known as the Alapaha River Sink, Suck Hole, or the Devil's Den on the western bank of the river. At the latter point during the periods of low water flow, the Alapaha River disappears underground leaving a dry bank for much of the remainder of its course. The Alapaha River later reappears at the Alapaha River Rise, which is about a half mile upstream from the confluence of the Alapaha River and the Suwannee River (30.446044°N 83.097483°W). During a period of low rainfall over 11 miles (18 km) of the riverbed can be dry as the river goes underground.

== Variant names ==
The United States Board of Geographic Names settled on the "Alapaha River" as the stream's name in 1891. According to the Geographic Names Information System, it has also been known as:

- Alabaha River
- Alapa Haw River
- Alapa Hawchu River
- Alla-pa-ha River
- Allallehaw River
- Allapacoochee River
- Allapaha River
- Allapauhau River
- Allaphaw River
- Allappaha River
- Allopohaw River
- Alloppehaw River
- Alopaha River
- Elapaha River
- Lappahaw River
- Lop Haw River
- Lopaha River
- Lopahatchy River
- Loppahaw River
- Low Haw River
- Popaha River

== Crossings ==
Crossing	Carries	Image	Location	ID number	Coordinates
=== Georgia ===
	Griffin Road				32.0243°N 83.6103°W
Buzzard Bridge	Willford Crossing Road				32.0243°N 83.6103°W
	County Line Road				32.0198°N 83.6103°W
	Seville Road				32.0089°N 83.6016°W
	Seville Road				32.0089°N 83.6016°W
	Seville-Pleasantview Road				31.9973°N 83.5908°W
	Old Cordele Road				31.9853°N 83.5778°W
	Flowers Road				31.9775°N 83.5761°W
	Watson Road				31.9670°N 83.5771°W
	Dowley Road				31.9478°N 83.5604°W
Rail bridge	CSX Transportation; Line formerly known as Savannah, Americus and Montgomery Railway				31.9478°N 83.5604°W
	US 280 / SR 30		Pitts, Georgia to Seville, Georgia		31.9312°N 83.5527°W
	Highway later replaced by SR 159				31.9312°N 83.5527°W
	SR 159				31.9303°N 83.5519°W
	Hawkinsville and Florida Southern Railway (Abandoned 1920s)				31.9234°N 83.5453°W
	SR 112				31.8587°N 83.4797°W
	Jay Calhoun Road				31.8587°N 83.4797°W
	SR 90		Rebecca, Georgia		31.7714°N 83.4547°W
Rail bridge	CSX Transportation; Line formerly known as Atlanta, Birmingham and Atlantic Railway				31.7714°N 83.4547°W
	Hawkinsville and Florida Southern Railway (Abandoned since before the 1920s)				31.7714°N 83.4547°W
	SR 107				31.6899°N 83.4615°W
Walker Ford					31.6899°N 83.4615°W
Flat Ford					31.6814°N 83.4621°W
	Crystal Lake Road				31.6772°N 83.4602°W
	SR 125 / SR 132				31.5327°N 83.3989°W
	Tifton and Northeastern Railroad (Line abandoned in the 1960s, defunct)				31.5497°N 83.4151°W
Lennon Bridge	US 319 / SR 35				31.5327°N 83.3989°W
	5 Bridge Road				31.4791°N 83.3447°W
McMillan Bridge	US 129 / SR 11				31.4303°N 83.2456°W
Sgt. James E. Jones Memorial Bridge	US 82 / SR 50				31.3714°N 83.1713°W
Rail bridge	CSX Transportation; Line formally known as the Brunswick and Albany Railroad				31.3714°N 83.1713°W
PVT. George W. Lee Memorial Bridge	SR 135				31.302988°N 83.053354°W
	Norfolk Southern Railway; Line formerly known as Ocilla, Pinebloom and Valdosta Railroad				31.053811°N 83.039627°W
Mud Creek Bridge	SR 168 / SR 64				31.156844°N 83.039514°W
	Waycross and Western Railroad (Closed 1925, defunct)				31.053811°N 83.039627°W
Knight's Bridge					
Captain Henry Will Jones Bridge	US 129 / SR 11		Lakeland, Georgia to Homerville, Georgia		31.046217°N 83.043361°W
Carters Ferry/Bridge	(Defunct)		Lakeland, Georgia to Magnolia, Georgia.		
Hotchkiss Bridge	Old State Road/Old River/Hotchiss Road (Built 1895, defunct)				30.936513°N 83.040614°W
	US 84 / SR 38		Naylor, Georgia to Stockton, Georgia		30.924563°N 83.037216°W
Rail bridge	CSX Transportation; Line formerly known as the Atlantic and Gulf Railroad (1856–79)				30.924074°N 83.036841°W
Lee Bridge	(Defunct)				30.858398°N 83.023588°W
Howells Ferry/Bridge	Howell Road (Old route, defunct)		Mayday, Georgia		30.828749°N 83.018640°W
	Howell Road		Mayday, Georgia		30.828193°N 83.018549°W
Rail bridge	Norfolk Southern Railway; Line formerly known as the Atlantic, Valdosta and Western Railway		Mayday, Georgia		30.826888°N 83.018458°W
Formally the location of Troublesome Ford	SR 94		Statenville, Georgia		30.703908°N 83.032683°W
=== Florida ===
	CR 150		Jennings, Florida to Jasper, Florida		30.598471°N 83.073230°W
Rail bridge	Norfolk Southern Railway; Line formerly known as Georgia Southern and Florida Railway				30.598135°N 83.073226°W
	NW 14th Terrace (Defunct)				30.593586°N 83.065301°W
	US 41 / SR 6		Jennings, Florida to Jasper, Florida		30.528814°N 83.038319°W
	I-75				30.499170°N 83.040930°W
	(Defunct)				30.453340°N 83.089351°W
	CR 751 (SW County Road 751)		Alapaha River Rise		30.448605°N 83.096923°W
