= Georgia State Route 125 =

State highway in Georgia

State Route 125
- SR 125 highlighted in red

Route information
- Maintained by GDOT
- Length: 72.6 mi (116.8 km)

Major junctions
- South end: US 41 / SR 7 in Valdosta
- US 129 / SR 11 / SR 37 in Ray City; US 129 / SR 11 / SR 76 / SR 168 in Nashville; US 41 / SR 7 in Tifton; US 82 / US 319 / SR 35 / SR 520 in Tifton
- North end: SR 107 in Fitzgerald

Location
- Country: United States
- State: Georgia
- Counties: Lowndes, Lanier, Berrien, Tift, Irwin, Ben Hill

Highway system
- Georgia State Highway System; Interstate; US; State; Special
← SR 124	→ SR 126

State Route 125 (SR 125) is a 73-mile-long (117 km) state highway that runs south-to-north in an S-shape through the southern part of the U.S. state of Georgia. It travels through Lowndes, Lanier, Berrien, Tift, Irwin, and Ben Hill counties connecting the Valdosta and Fitzgerald metropolitan areas.

== Route description ==
SR 125 begins at an intersection with U.S. Route 41 (US 41) and SR 7 (Inner Perimeter Road) on the north side of Valdosta. The route runs north-northeast, past Freedom Park and passes through Moody Air Force Base and intersects SR 122 at the meeting point of Lowndes, Berrien, and Lanier counties. It travels to the north along the Berrien–Lanier county line and then jogs slightly to the northeast, entering Lanier County proper. In Berrien County, it curves to the north-northwest before entering Ray City. Here, it meets US 129/SR 11/SR 37 (Main Street). At this intersection, US 129/SR 11 begin a concurrency. The three highways head north-northwest to Nashville. In town, SR 76 (Adel Highway) joins the concurrency through Nashville. In the central part of town, the four concurrent routes intersect SR 168 (East McPherson Avenue). Just after that SR 76 departs to the east on East Marion Avenue, while SR 125 departs to the west on West Marion Avenue. It heads northwest through rural areas of the county and enters Tift County.

In Tift County, it intersects US 41/SR 7 next to the Henry Tift Myers Airport, just southeast of Unionville. US 41/SR 7/SR 125 head concurrent to the north. In Tifton, the highway meets US 82/US 319/SR 35/SR 520 (East 5th Street). Farther into town, SR 125 splits off to the northeast and enters Irwin County. It runs northeast until it joins SR 32 (Sycamore Highway). They run concurrent to the northeast, through Irwinville, and to the east-southeast until SR 32 (Mystic Highway) splits off to the southeast. SR 125 curves to the northeast and continues in that direction until it meets its northern terminus, an intersection with SR 107 (Benjamin H. Hill Drive West), at the southwestern edge of Fitzgerald.

The only part of SR 125 that is part of the National Highway System, a system of roadways important to the nation's economy, defense, and mobility, is the section from the US 82/US 319/SR 35/SR 520 intersection in Tifton north to Fitzgerald.

== Major intersections ==
County	Location	mi	km	Destinations	Notes
Lowndes	Valdosta	0.0	0.0	US 41 / SR 7 (Inner Perimeter Road) / Bemiss Road	
Lowndes–Berrien– Lanier county tripoint		11.1	17.9	SR 122 (The Sheriffs Boys Ranch Road/Lakeland–Hahira Road) – Hahira, Lakeland	
Lanier	No major junctions				
Berrien	Ray City	14.5	23.3	US 129 south / SR 11 south / SR 37 (Main Street)	Southern end of US 129/SR 11 concurrency
Berrien	Nashville	23.9	38.5	SR 76 west – Adel	Southern end of SR 76 concurrency
Berrien	Nashville	24.3	39.1	SR 168 east (East McPherson Avenue)	Western terminus of SR 168
Berrien	Nashville	24.4	39.3	US 129 north / SR 11 north (North Davis Street) / SR 76 east (East Marion Avenue) – Alapaha, Willacoochee	Northern end of US 129/SR 11/SR 76 concurrency
Tift		46.5	74.8	US 41 south / SR 7 south	Southern end of US 41/SR 7 concurrency
Tift	Tifton	48.4	77.9	US 82 / US 319 / SR 35 / SR 520 (East 5th Street)	
Tift	Tifton	49.3	79.3	US 41 north / SR 7 north (East 12th Street)	Northern end of US 41/SR 7 concurrency
Irwin		63.0	101.4	SR 32 west (Sycamore Road) – Sycamore	Southern end of SR 32 concurrency
Irwin		67.6	108.8	SR 32 east (Mystic Highway) – Ocilla	Northern end of SR 32 concurrency
Ben Hill	Fitzgerald	72.6	116.8	SR 107 (Benjamin H. Hill Drive West) – Ashburn, Jacksonville	
1.000 mi = 1.609 km; 1.000 km = 0.621 mi: Concurrency terminus
