= Okapilco Creek =

Coordinates: 30.75270°N 83.48516°W

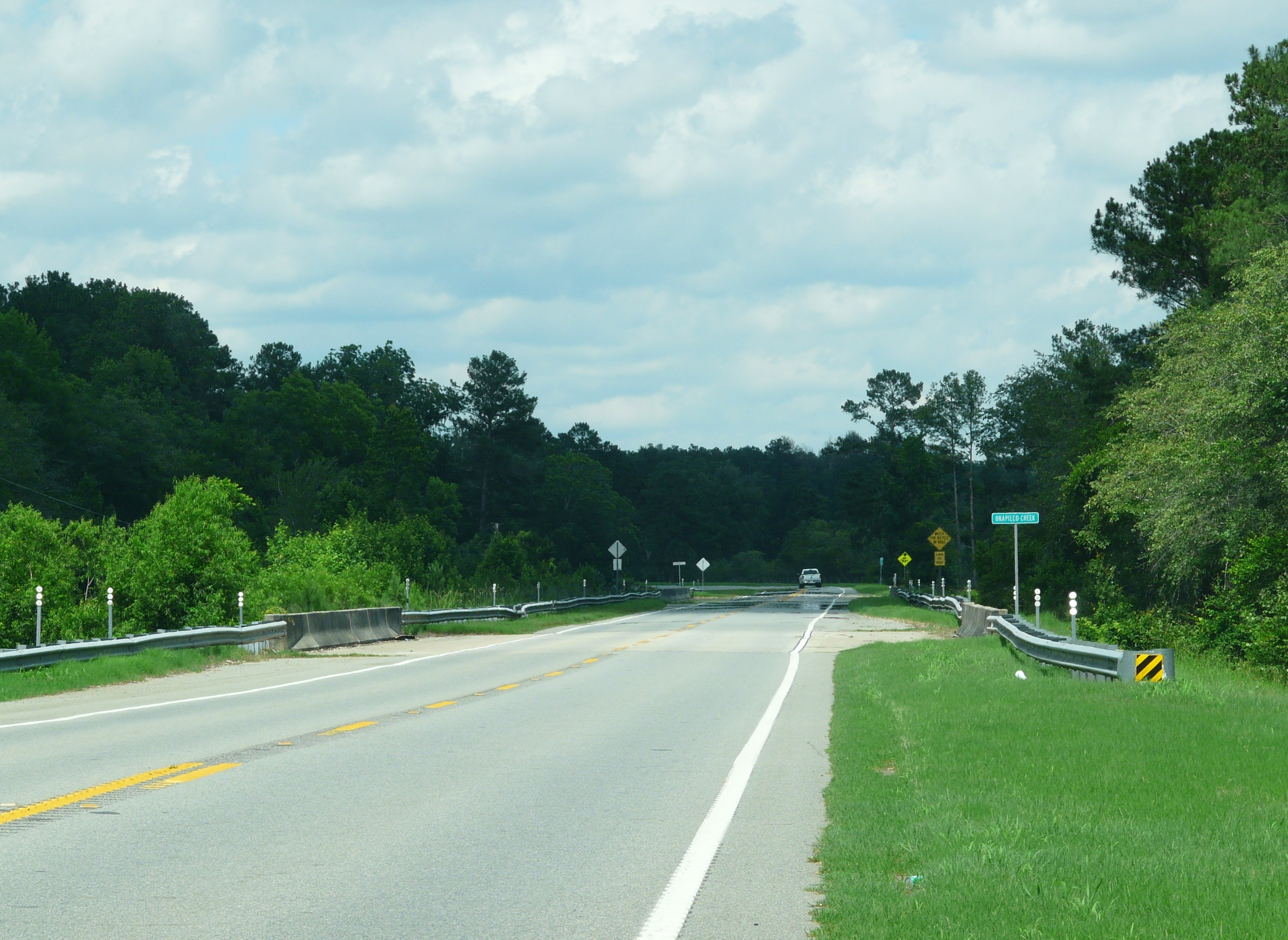
- Georgia State Route 76 bridge

Location
- Country: United States

Physical characteristics
- Source
  - location: Georgia

Okapilco Creek is a 63-mile-long (101 km) tributary of the Withlacoochee River in the U.S. state of Georgia. Via the Withlacoochee and the Suwannee River, the waters of Okapilco Creek flow to the Gulf of Mexico.

The creek rises in southern Worth County at Anderson City and flows southeast through Colquitt and Brooks counties to join the Withlacoochee 6 miles (10 km) southeast of Quitman.

== See also ==
- List of rivers of Georgia
