= Berrien County School District =

School district in Georgia (U.S. state)

Berrien High School
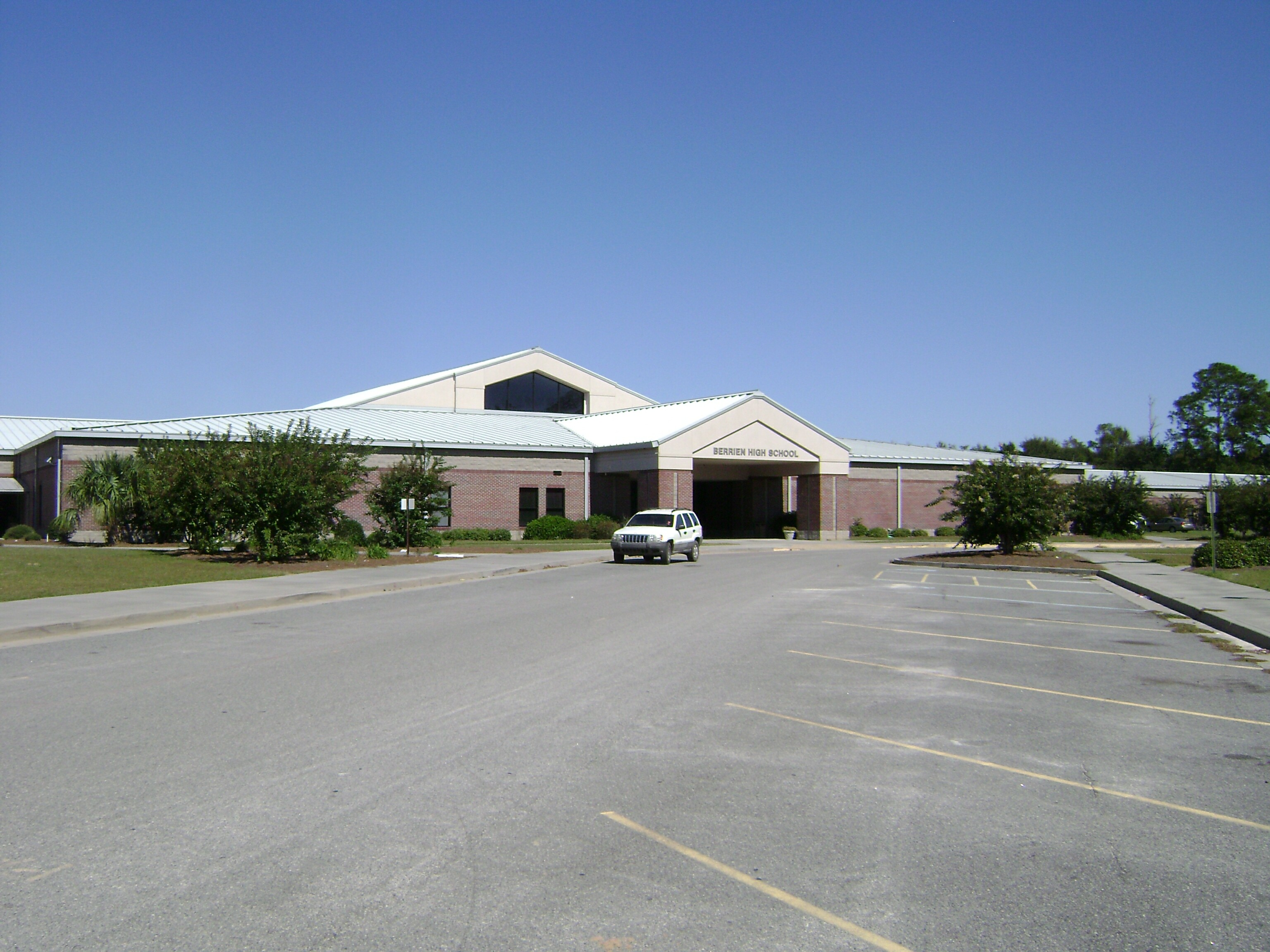

Location
- 500 East Smith Avenue; Nashville, (Berrien County), Georgia 31639; United States

Information
- Type: Public high school
- Principal: Margo Mathis
- Staff: 57.00 (FTE)
- Enrollment: 856 (2023-24)
- Student to teacher ratio: 15.02
- Colors: Gray and red
- Nickname: Rebels
- Website: Berrien High School

Berrien County School District

Address
- 810 South Dogwood Drive Nashville, Georgia, 31639; United States
- Coordinates: 31°11′56″N 83°15′29″W

District information
- Grades: Pre-school - 12
- Superintendent: Robin Marcrum

Students and staff
- Enrollment: 3,037
- Faculty: 172

Other information
- Accreditation: Southern Association of Colleges and Schools; Georgia Accrediting Commission
- Website: www.berrien.k12.ga.us

The Berrien High School is in the Berrien County School District, a public school district in Berrien County, Georgia, United States, based in Nashville, Georgia. The school district includes the entire county and serves the communities of West Berrien, Alapaha, Enigma, Nashville, and Ray City.

== Schools ==
The Berrien County School District has two elementary schools, one middle school, and one high school.

Schools:

- Berrien Primary School
- Berrien Elementary School
- Berrien Middle School
- Berrien High School
