= Suwannoochee Creek =

Coordinates: 30.65883°N 82.58013°W

Location
- Country: United States

Physical characteristics
- Source
  - location: Georgia

Suwannoochee Creek is a 49.0-mile-long (78.9 km) tributary of the Suwannee River in the U.S. state of Georgia. It rises in western Clinch County, Georgia, about 11 miles (18 km) west of Homerville, and flows southeast to join the Suwannee near Fargo. For the lower half of its course it forms the boundary between Clinch and Echols counties.

== See also ==
- List of rivers of Georgia
