= Ray City, Georgia =

- City
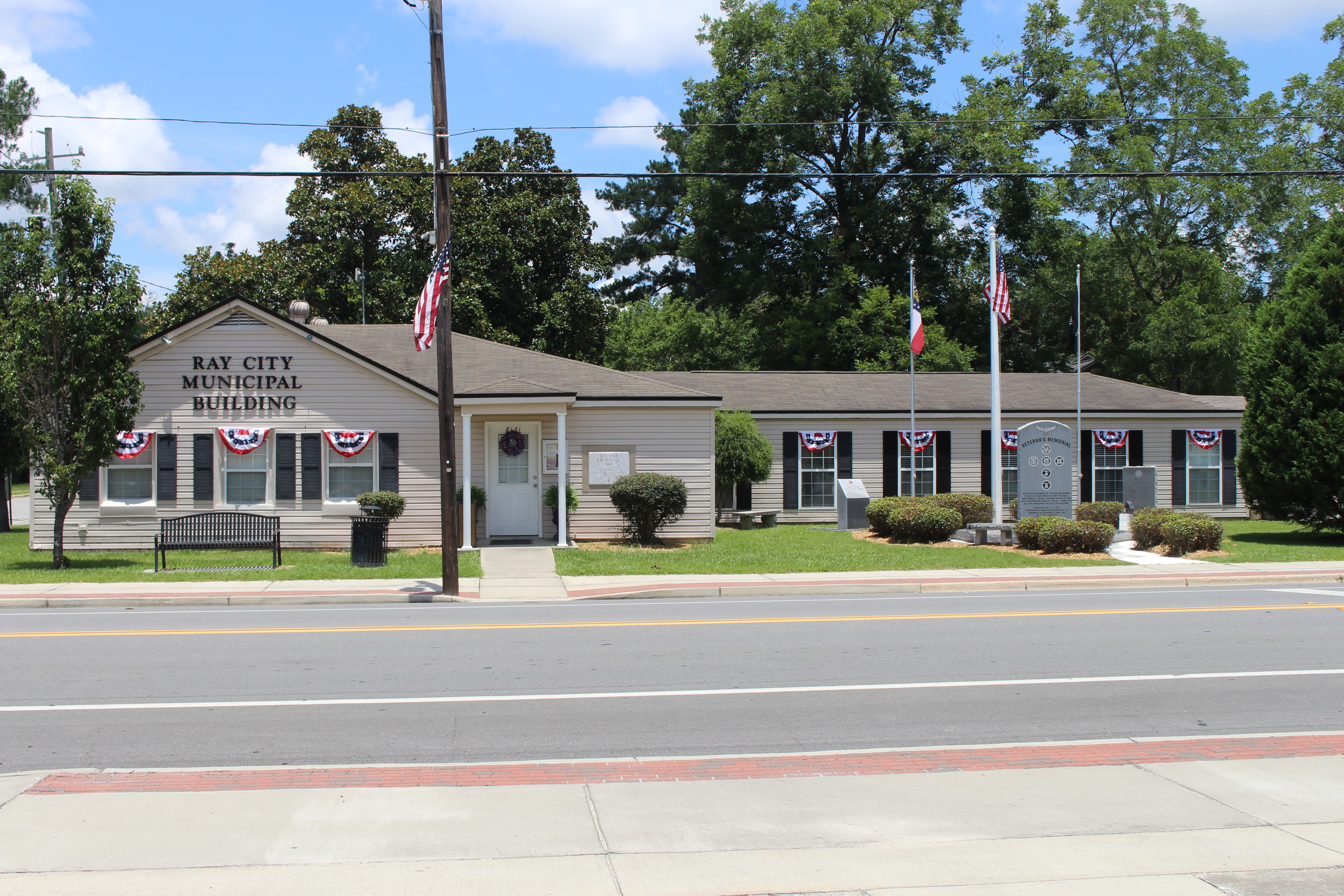
- Ray City Municipal Building

- Seal

- Location in Berrien County and the state of Georgia
- Coordinates: 31°4′32″N 83°11′51″W
- Country: United States
- State: Georgia
- Counties: Berrien, Lanier

Government
  - Mayor: Brenda Exum

Area
  - Total: 1.15 sq mi (2.97 km^{2})
  - Land: 1.15 sq mi (2.97 km^{2})
  - Water: 0 sq mi (0.00 km^{2})
- Elevation: 190 ft (58 m)

Population (2020)
  - Total: 956
  - Density: 834.1/sq mi (322.03/km^{2})
- Time zone: UTC-5 (Eastern (EST))
  - Summer (DST): UTC-4 (EDT)
- ZIP code: 31645
- Area code: 229
- FIPS code: 13-63728
- GNIS feature ID: 0332800
- Website: http://raycityga.gov/

Ray City is a city in Berrien County and Lanier County, Georgia, United States. The population was 956 in 2020.

== History ==
Early variant names were "Ray's Pond" and "Ray's Mill". The community was named after Thomas M. Ray, the proprietor of a local mill.

== Geography ==
Ray City is in southern Berrien County, with a small portion extending south into Lanier County. U.S. Route 129 passes through the city, leading north 10 miles (16 km) to Nashville, the Berrien county seat, and east 8 miles (13 km) to Lakeland, the Lanier county seat. Georgia State Route 125 leads south from Ray City 18 miles (29 km) to Valdosta, and State Route 37 leads west 14 miles (23 km) to Adel.

According to the United States Census Bureau, Ray City has a total area of 1.2 square miles (3.0 km^{2}), of which 0.52 acres (2,119 m^{2}), or 0.07%, are water. Beaverdam Creek flows through the middle of the city, and Batterbee Branch flows through the west side. The two streams join west of Ray City to form Cat Creek, a south-flowing tributary of the Withlacoochee River, part of the Suwannee River watershed.

== Demographics ==
Historical population
Census	Pop.	Note	%±
1910	300		—
1920	700		133.3%
1930	602		−14.0%
1940	638		6.0%
1950	576		−9.7%
1960	713		23.8%
1970	617		−13.5%
1980	658		6.6%
1990	603		−8.4%
2000	746		23.7%
2010	1,090		46.1%
2020	956		−12.3%
U.S. Decennial Census; 1850-1870 1870-1880; 1890-1910 1920-1930; 1940 1950 1960; 1970 1980 1990; 2000 2010

Ray City racial composition as of 2020
Race	Num.	Perc.
White (non-Hispanic)	621	64.94%
Black or African American (non-Hispanic)	205	21.44%
Native American	1	0.1%
Asian	9	0.94%
Other/Mixed	39	4.08%
Hispanic or Latino	81	8.47%

As of the 2020 United States census, there were 956 people, 484 households, and 313 families residing in the city.

== Education ==
Residents of Barrien County are in the Berrien County School District.

Residents of Lanier County are in the Lanier County School District.

== Gallery ==
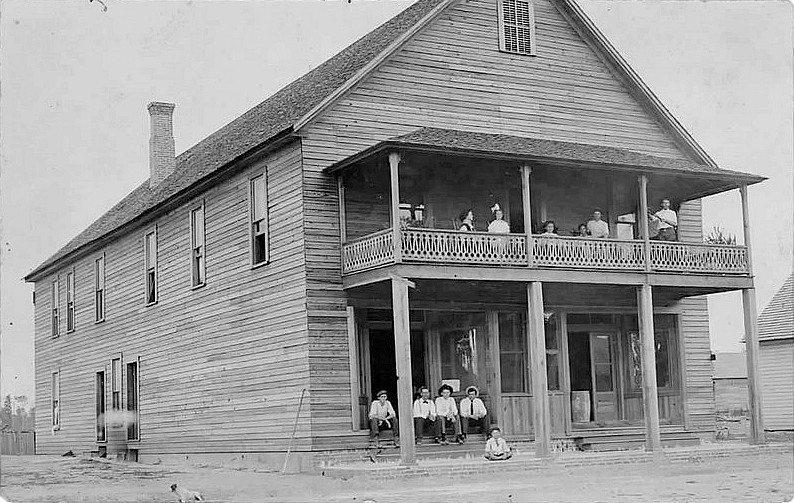
Ray City Hotel, circa 1912

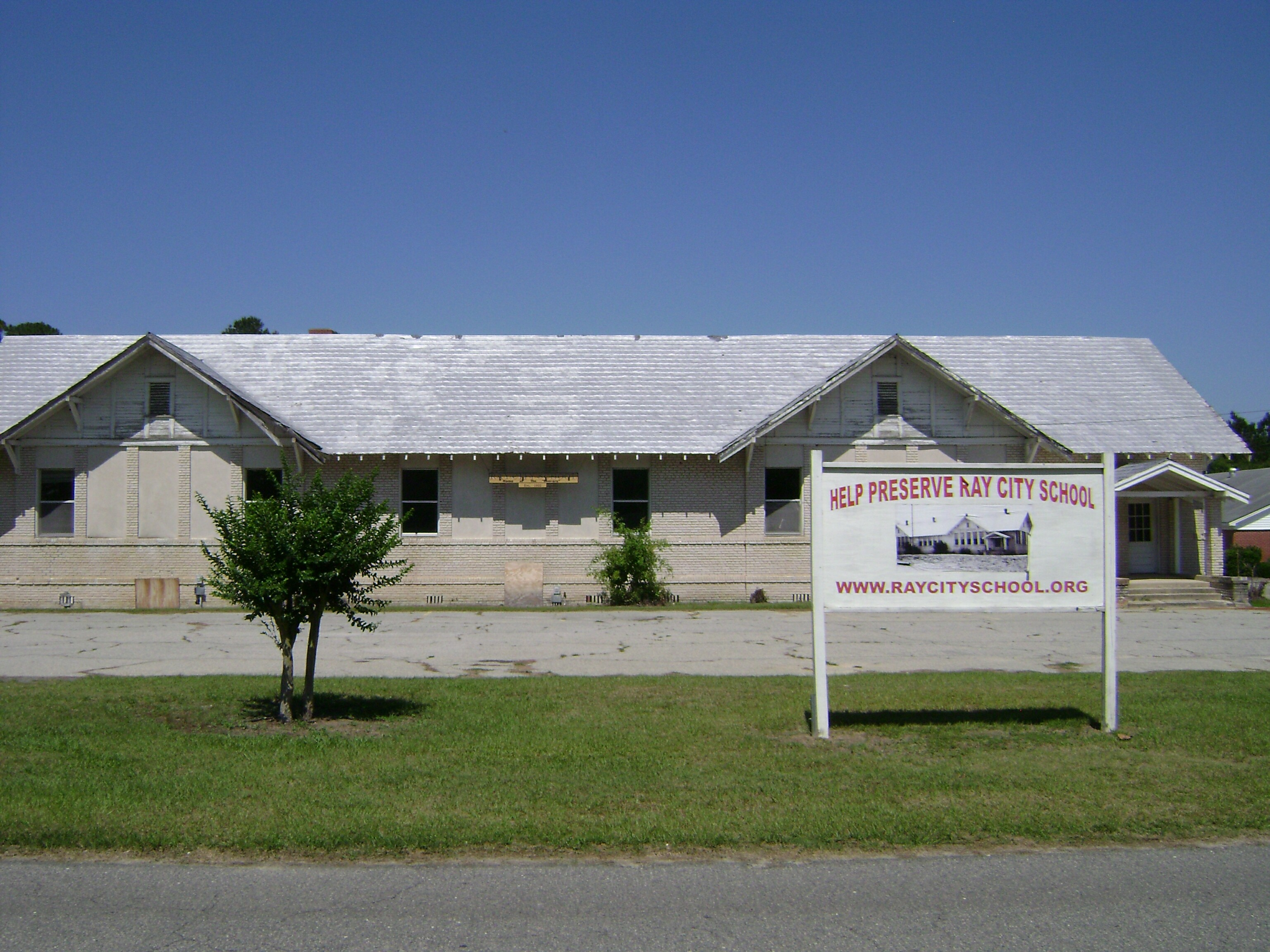
Historic Ray City High School

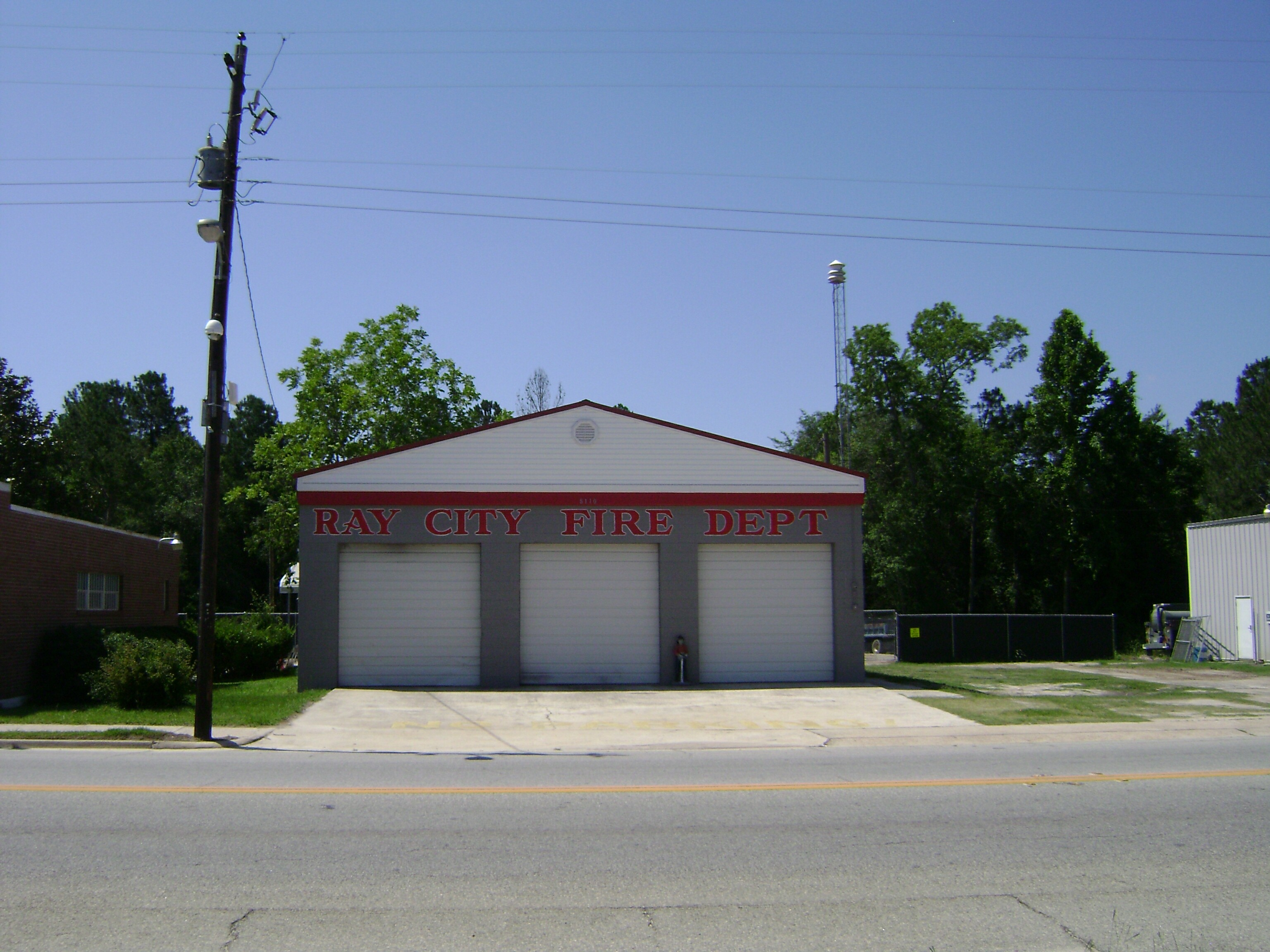
Fire Department

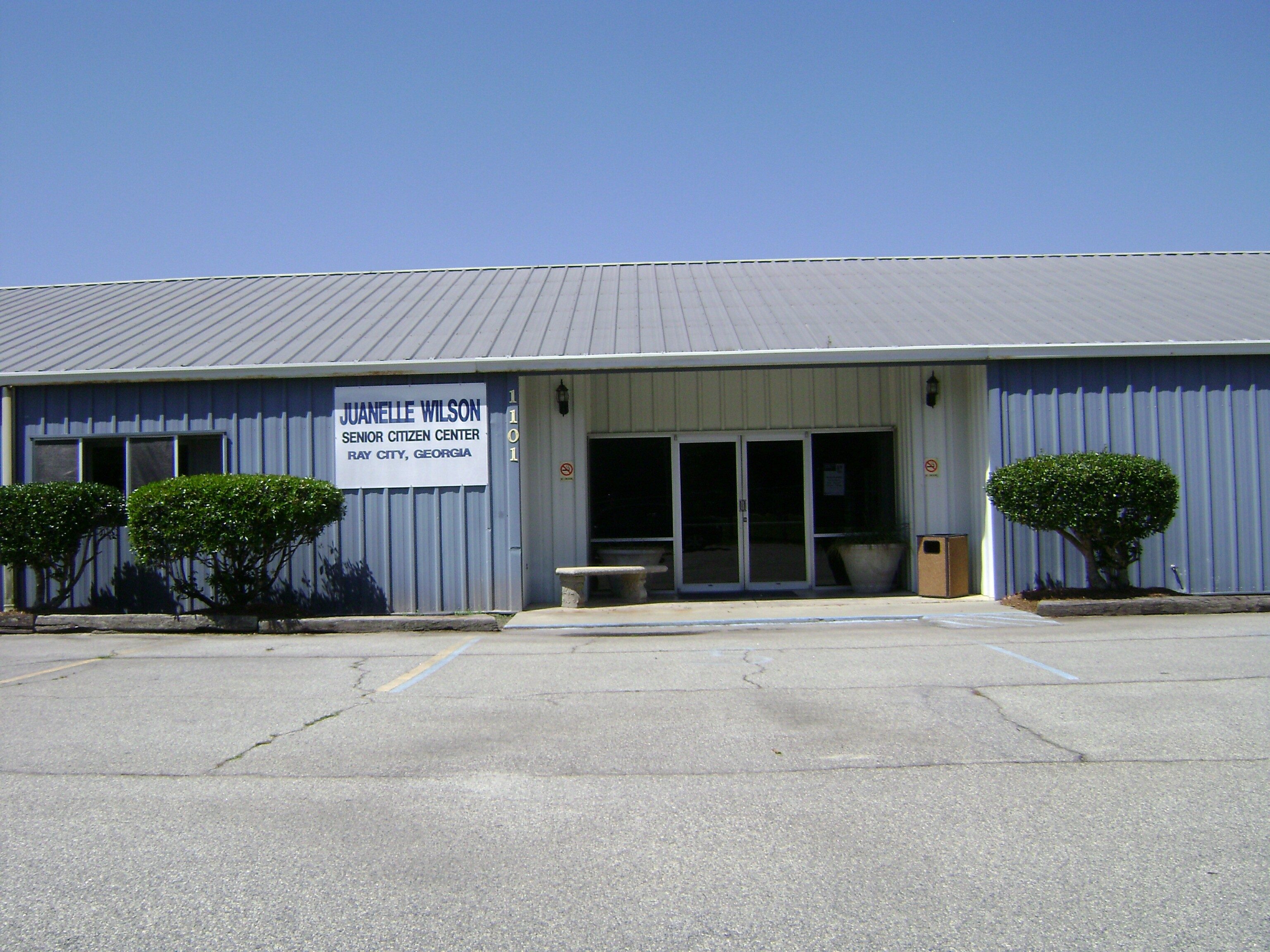
Juanelle Wilson Senior Citizen Center
