= Nashville, Georgia =

- City
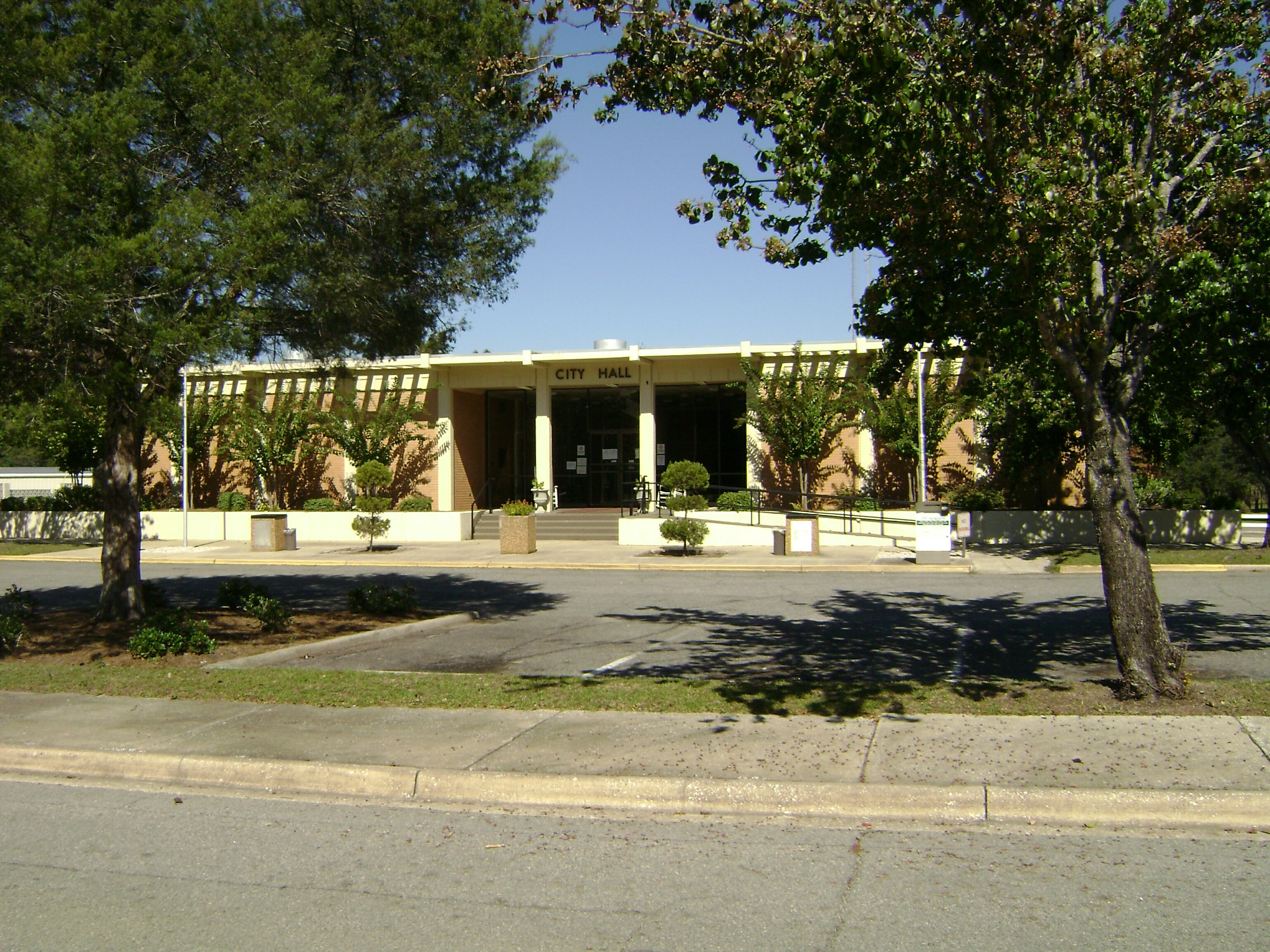
- Nashville City Hall

- Location in Berrien County and the state of Georgia
- Coordinates: 31°12′25″N 83°14′48″W
- Country: United States
- State: Georgia
- County: Berrien

Area
  - Total: 4.91 sq mi (12.72 km^{2})
  - Land: 4.86 sq mi (12.58 km^{2})
  - Water: 0.054 sq mi (0.14 km^{2})
- Elevation: 240 ft (73 m)

Population (2020)
  - Total: 4,947
  - Density: 1,019/sq mi (393.3/km^{2})
- Time zone: UTC-5 (Eastern (EST))
  - Summer (DST): UTC-4 (EDT)
- ZIP code: 31639,31620
- Area codes: 229,912
- FIPS code: 13-54264
- GNIS feature ID: 0332466
- Website: www.cityofnashvillega.net

Nashville is a city in and the county seat of Berrien County, Georgia, United States. The population was 4,947 at the 2020 census. It is called the "City of Dogwoods", as the tree grows in large numbers around the area.

== History ==
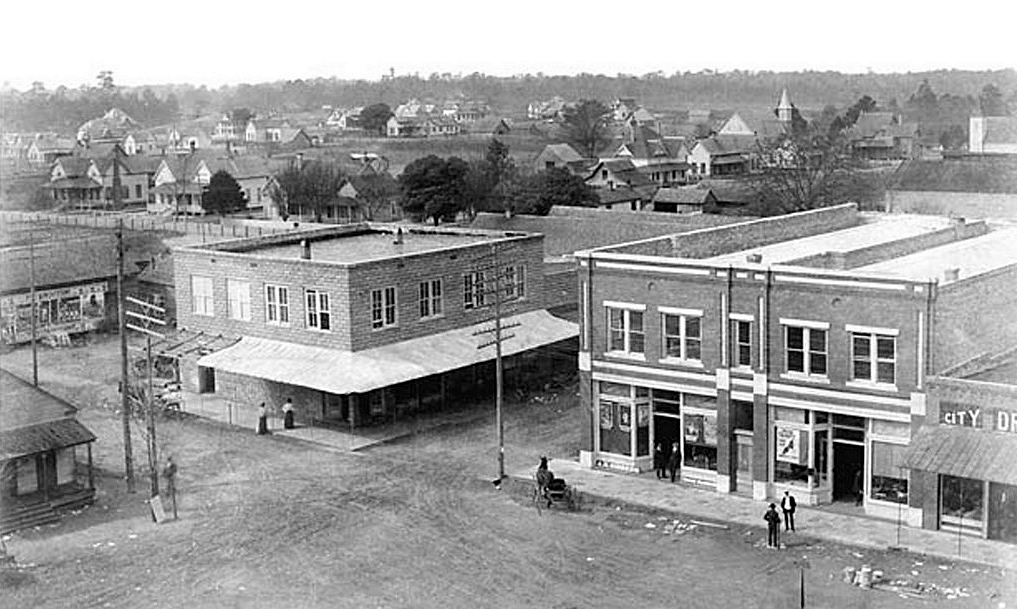
Nashville Square, circa 1905

Nashville was founded about 1840. In 1856, Nashville was designated seat of the newly formed Berrien County. It was incorporated as a town in 1892 and as a city in 1900. While some say the city is named after Francis Nash (1742–1777), an officer in the American Revolutionary War, many historical articles in the local newspaper claim otherwise. The Berrien Press published an article in its November 22, 2006 edition under the title of Will the Naming of Nashville Controversy Ever Be Truly Settled? The 2006 article pointed to The Griffin Papers, written in the 1930s, and several articles from The Nashville Herald - December 24, 1909, October 14, 1910, January 19, 1933, June 13, 1935, June 29, 1944, October 12, 1950, November 27, 1952, and March 5, 1953. Every one of these articles, and the 1956 Berrien County Centennial plates all lay claim to Nashville being named after Simon W. Nash, a local citizen of the 1850s and 1860s.

== Geography ==
According to the United States Census Bureau, the city has a total area of 4.7 square miles (12.2 km^{2}), of which 4.6 square miles (12.0 km^{2}) is land and 0.039 square miles (0.1 km^{2}), or 1.13%, is water.

=== Climate ===
The climate in this area is characterized by relatively high temperatures and evenly distributed precipitation throughout the year. According to the Köppen Climate Classification system, Nashville has a humid subtropical climate, abbreviated "Cfa" on climate maps.

Climate data for Nashville, Georgia
Month	Jan	Feb	Mar	Apr	May	Jun	Jul	Aug	Sep	Oct	Nov	Dec	Year
Mean daily maximum °C (°F)	17 (62)	19 (66)	22 (72)	27 (80)	30 (86)	33 (91)	33 (92)	33 (92)	31 (88)	27 (81)	23 (73)	18 (65)	26 (79)
Mean daily minimum °C (°F)	3 (37)	4 (40)	8 (46)	12 (53)	16 (60)	19 (66)	20 (68)	20 (68)	18 (65)	12 (54)	7 (45)	4 (39)	12 (53)
Average precipitation mm (inches)	110 (4.5)	120 (4.8)	120 (4.7)	110 (4.2)	110 (4.4)	120 (4.9)	140 (5.6)	150 (6.1)	86 (3.4)	53 (2.1)	64 (2.5)	110 (4.2)	1,300 (51.2)
Source: Weatherbase

== Demographics ==
Historical population
Census	Pop.	Note	%±
1870	95		—
1890	426		—
1900	293		−31.2%
1910	990		237.9%
1920	2,025		104.5%
1930	1,672		−17.4%
1940	2,449		46.5%
1950	3,414		39.4%
1960	4,070		19.2%
1970	4,323		6.2%
1980	4,831		11.8%
1990	4,782		−1.0%
2000	4,697		−1.8%
2010	4,939		5.2%
2020	4,947		0.2%
U.S. Decennial Census

=== 2020 census ===
As of the 2020 census, Nashville had a population of 4,947. The median age was 37.6 years. 25.2% of residents were under the age of 18 and 17.6% of residents were 65 years of age or older. For every 100 females there were 89.0 males, and for every 100 females age 18 and over there were 83.0 males age 18 and over.

97.7% of residents lived in urban areas, while 2.3% lived in rural areas.

There were 1,943 households in Nashville, of which 32.5% had children under the age of 18 living in them. Of all households, 37.6% were married-couple households, 18.0% were households with a male householder and no spouse or partner present, and 35.9% were households with a female householder and no spouse or partner present. About 32.2% of all households were made up of individuals and 15.0% had someone living alone who was 65 years of age or older. There were 1,217 families residing in the city.

There were 2,177 housing units, of which 10.7% were vacant. The homeowner vacancy rate was 1.8% and the rental vacancy rate was 11.2%.

Nashville racial composition as of 2020
Race	Num.	Perc.
White (non-Hispanic)	3,470	70.14%
Black or African American (non-Hispanic)	1,047	21.16%
Native American	11	0.22%
Asian	22	0.44%
Other/Mixed	201	4.06%
Hispanic or Latino	196	3.96%

== Education ==
Berrien County students in kindergarten to grade twelve are in the Berrien County School District, which consists of two elementary schools, a middle school, a high school, and a charter school. The district has 172 full-time teachers and over 3,037 students.

- Berrien Primary School
- Berrien Elementary School
- Berrien Middle School
- Berrien High School
- Berrien Academy

The city of Nashville is served by a public library, the Carrie Dorsey Perry Memorial Library, a part of the Coastal Plain Regional Library System network.
