= National Register of Historic Places listings in Coffee County, Georgia =

This is a list of properties and districts in Coffee County, Georgia that are listed on the National Register of Historic Places (NRHP).

This National Park Service list is complete through NPS recent listings posted March 21, 2025.

== Current listings ==
	Name on the Register	Image	Date listed	Location	City or town	Description
1	63rd Army Air Forces Contract Pilot School (Primary)	63rd Army Air Forces Contract Pilot School (Primary)	May 14, 2013 (#13000270)	2700 S. Peterson Ave. 31°28′48″N 82°51′08″W	Douglas	At the Douglas Municipal Airport, several buildings used to train pilots in World War II
2	Downtown Douglas Historic District	Downtown Douglas Historic District	September 9, 1993 (#93000941)	Roughly bounded by Jackson St., Pearl Ave., Cherry St. and the Georgia-Florida RR tracks 31°30′25″N 82°51′02″W	Douglas	Union Banking Company in the Downtown Douglas Historic District
3	Eleventh District A & M School-South Georgia College Historic District	Eleventh District A & M School-South Georgia College Historic District	May 21, 2010 (#10000274)	Roughly bounded by College Park Dr., Brooks & Tiger Rds. 31°29′44″N 82°51′19″W	Douglas	Includes other buildings at the college, contributing buildings were built 1907-58
4	Gaskin Avenue Historic District	Gaskin Avenue Historic District	October 21, 1993 (#93001138)	Roughly bounded by Madison Ave., Wilson St., Pearl Ave., Gordon St., McDonald Ave., Atlantic Coastline RR and Coffee Ave; 31°30′38″N 82°50′40″W	Douglas	
5	Lonnie A. Pope House	Lonnie A. Pope House	June 17, 1982 (#82002395)	Jackson St. and Central of Georgia RR tracks (the RR tracks are no longer there - called "Douglas Trail" now); 31°30′39″N 82°51′09″W	Douglas	Built in 1910
6	Union Banking Company Building	Union Banking Company Building	December 10, 1982 (#82000144)	102 Peterson Ave. 31°30′33″N 82°51′00″W	Douglas	Built in 1911, also known as the Coffee County Bank
