= Sapps Still, Georgia =

Unincorporated community in Georgia, U.S.

Coordinates: 31°42′58″N 82°56′15″W

Sapps Still is an unincorporated community in Coffee County, Georgia, United States.

== History ==
Sapps Still was developed as the site of a turpentine still in the early 1900s. A community developed around the turpentine still to provide housing and provisions to support the still workers and their families. The still exploded due to a fire and was replaced by a lumber mill that was built in its place. Ruins and remains of both facilities still stand. The kiln for drying the lumber sawn at the mill remains standing as well having been repurposed as a hay barn after the mill closed in the 1950s. A rail spur [1] that passed through Sapps Still connected the barge and steamboat wharf on the Ocmulgee River at Relee, five miles to the north, with the county seat of Douglas, and from there to other rail lines. The rail spur was used to transport naval stores from the turpentine still and later, lumber from the lumber mill. The Relee-to-Sapps-Still line closed in 1950, and the Sapps-Still-to-Douglas line closed in 1958.

== Geography ==
Sapps Still is located at 31°42'58"N 82°56'15"W (31.7160206, -82.9373684). The highest elevation is 322'. Sapps Still sits at the junction of Sapps Still Road (Coffee County unimproved road #498)[4] and US Highway 441. Sapps Still is 131 miles driving distance NW of Jacksonville, Florida; 180 miles driving distance SE of Atlanta, Georgia; and 98 miles driving distance SE of Macon, Georgia. An abandoned telephone long-distance microwave relay tower stands approximately one-half mile south of Sapps Still on the east side of US Highway 441, and is often cited as a landmark.
