= Coffee Correctional Facility =

Prison in Nicholls, Georgia, U.S.

Coordinates: 31°31′50″N 82°38′17″W

- Interactive map of Coffee Correctional Facility
- Location: 1153 North Liberty Street Nicholls, Georgia
- Status: open
- Security class: medium security
- Capacity: 3032
- Opened: 1998; expanded 2009
- Managed by: Georgia Department of Corrections

Coffee Correctional Facility, also called Coffee Correctional Institution, is a privately operated, medium-security prison for adult men, owned and operated by CoreCivic under contract with the Georgia Department of Corrections. The facility was built in 1998 in Nicholls, Coffee County, Georgia, and renovated in 2009.

The maximum capacity of the prison is 3032 inmates.
