= 63rd Army Air Forces Contract Pilot School =

- U.S. National Register of Historic Places
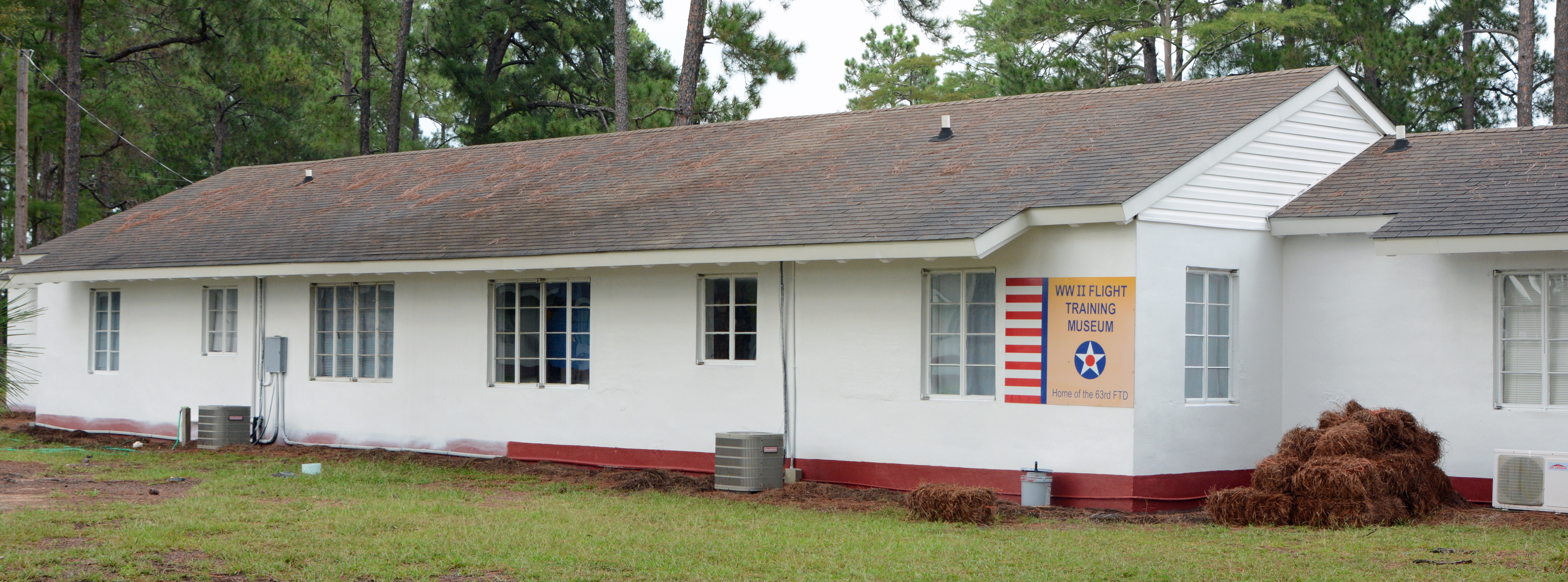
- 63rd Army Air Forces Contract Pilot School

- Location within Georgia Location within the United States
- Location: 2700 S. Peterson Avenue; Douglas, Georgia
- Coordinates: 31.48°N 82.8522°W
- Built: 1941
- Architect: Stefan H. Zachar
- NRHP reference No.: 13000270
- Added to NRHP: May 14, 2013

The 63rd Army Air Forces Contract Pilot School is located at the Douglas Municipal Airport in Coffee County, Georgia. During World War II, it was part of the Civilian Pilot Training Act of 1939, to train civilian pilots to serve as contract labor in an auxiliary capacity for the military. The program lasted until 1944, during which 250,000 men and women had been certified as pilots by the contract schools. At the Douglas facility, 9,000 pilots had been certified between its opening in 1941 and its closing in 1944. The buildings that remain intact were listed on the National Register of Historic Places on May 14, 2013.

== Civilian Pilot Training Program ==
As conditions led up to World War II, the United States joined European nations in strengthening its armed forces, which included the training of civilians for participation in the country's defense. The experimental Civilian Pilot Training Program (CPTP) had been operating since 1938, without the involvement of the military. When President Franklin D. Roosevelt signed the Civilian Pilot Training Act on June 27, 1939, the military began setting up its own schools. The CPTP became the Civil Aeronautics Authority (CAA) War Training Service on December 7, 1942. The civilians who were certified as pilots through the program served as an auxiliary contract labor force in addition to the existing military strength. By 1944 when the combined civilian and military training programs ended, 435,000 men and women had qualified as pilots at 1,460 flight schools, and 1,132 colleges and universities. Of those figures, 250,000 were trained at 75 Contract Pilot flight schools.

== Construction and management ==
The 63rd Army Air Forces Contract Pilot School was built and administered by different levels of government and civilian entities. The city of Douglas and Coffee County jointly purchased the land in 1941 and retained responsibility for clearing and maintaining the acreage. Oversight of the construction and daily operations of the school were contracted to the civilian Raymond-O'Neal Aviation Company, partnered by Wesley Newman Raymond and B. P. O'Neal.

The United States Army Corps of Engineers reviewed and approved the building design by Miami architect Stefan H. Zachar. Construction by private Miami contractor C. Franklin Wheeler commenced in July 1941. Both the architect and contractor had previously built a primary training school for the 53d Flying Training Detachment at what is now Carlstrom Field in Florida. Cost overruns led to partner O'Neal resigning, and being replaced by George Brinckerhoff to form the Raymond-Brinckerhoff Aviation Company.

The Defense Plant Corporation (DPC) was created in 1940 as a subsidiary of Reconstruction Finance Corporation for the purpose of financing war time endeavors that might not prove profitable once the war ended. DPC would then lease the facilities to private companies to operate the businesses. With that method, DPC assumed the fixed assets of Raymond-Brinckerhoff Aviation Company on January 2, 1942, and the aviation partners in turn leased the facilities to operate the school. George Brinckerhoff resigned in July, and Robert Richardson became Raymond's partner.

== Training and the facilities ==
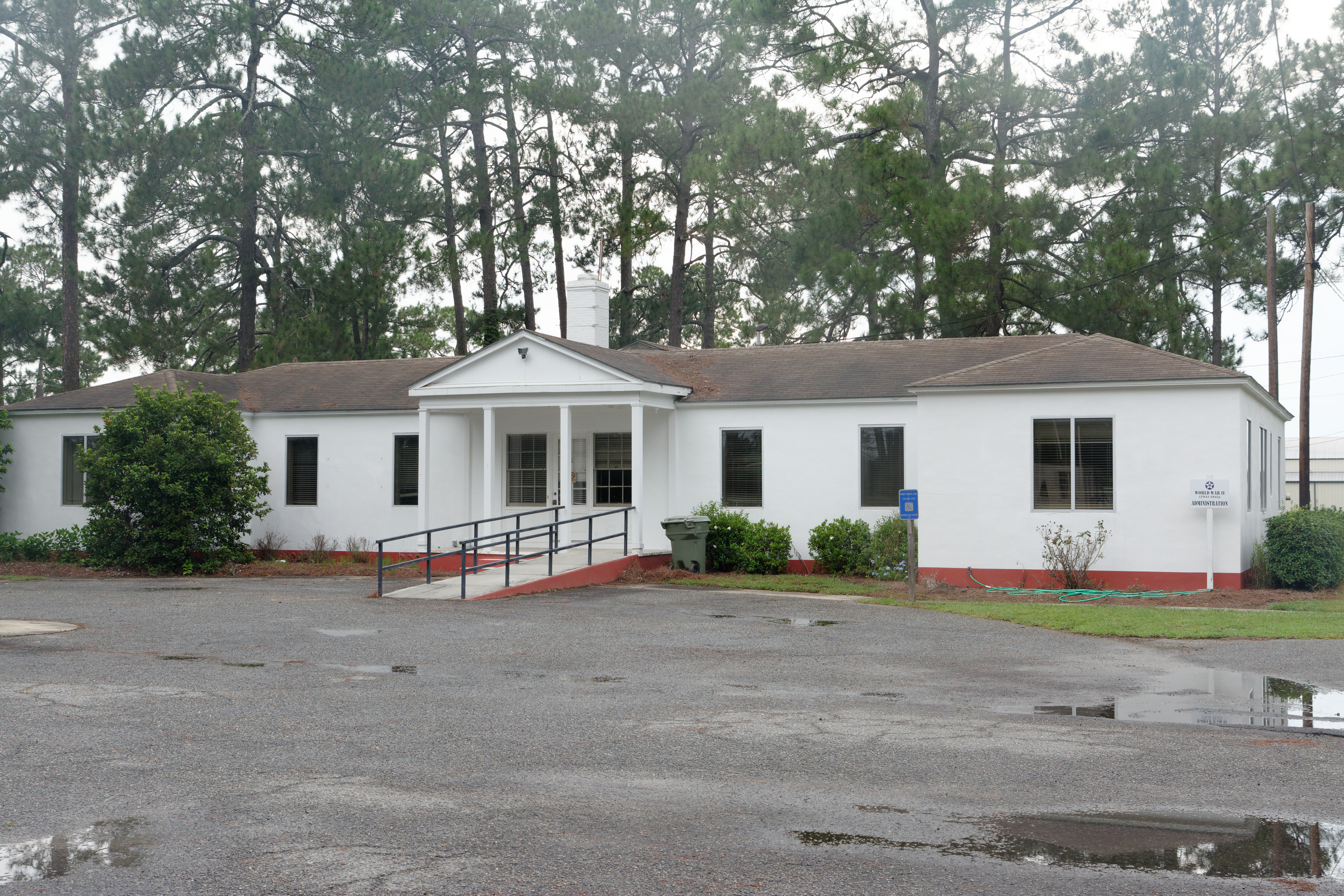
Front of the building

The Contract Pilot School in Douglas, Georgia was constructed as a primary training school on a 700-acre (280 ha) tract in 1941–1943. In this case, "primary" training meant that the potential civilian pilots already had some measure of basic flight instructions before arriving. The Douglas school gave them 100 hours of classroom instruction that included basic instrument training with the Link Trainer. Following that, they were given lessons in flying the PT-17 biplane, and learned to solo. In order to graduate, the civilian pilots needed 60 hours of flying time and 175 landings.

The military construction in the United States during World War II was usually intended for temporary usage, only built to last out the conflict. Speed, minimal expense and functionality dominated as prefabricated wooden buildings were erected to meet the immediate needs. By contrast, the school in Douglas was built with concrete and clay-like tiles, thereby ensuring that many of the structures have survived into the 21st Century.

Construction began in August on the sod landing strip, with a second landing strip finished before the end of 1941. In October, the first classroom opened to 50 students. Seventeen more buildings would follow, including living quarters for the pilots and a mess hall. Both men and women students were accepted, and the school grounds eventually accommodated recreational activities. Within two years of its opening, the training facilities employed 1,000 people at expenses in excess of $1,000,000 annually. Graduations were celebrated, and social and athletic events were part of the lifestyle. The government closed down the schools in 1944 to concentrate its forces in the war zones. The 63rd Army Air Forces Contract Pilot School at Douglas had successfully trained 9,000 pilots by the time it closed on December 28, 1944.

== Aftermath ==
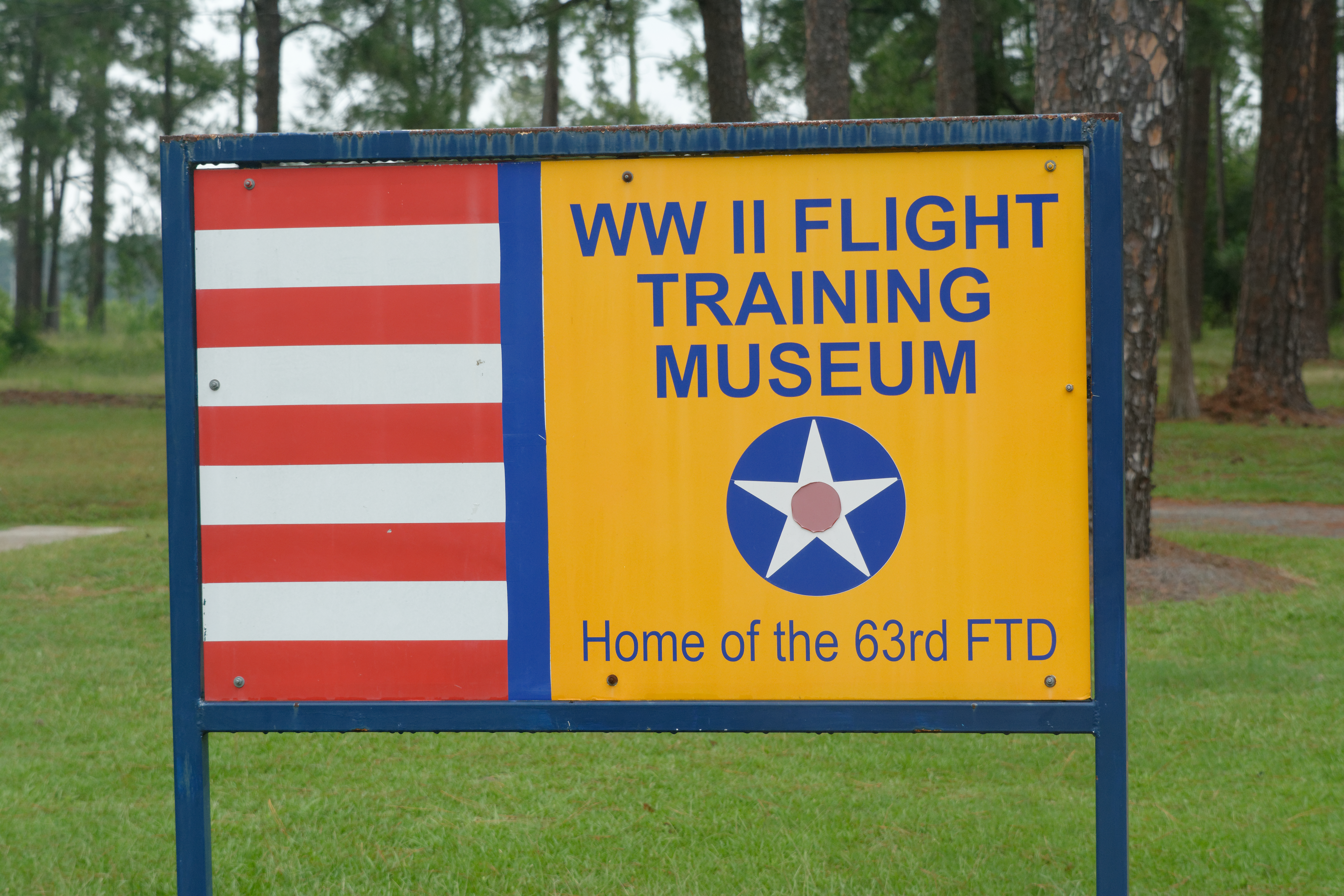
Museum sign

The airfield was re-purposed after the war as Douglas Municipal Airport. The 63rd Army Air Forces Contract Pilot School training facilities that remain intact were added to the National Register of Historic Places listings on May 14, 2013.

== See also ==
- United States Army Air Forces Contract Flying School Airfields
