= Broxton, Georgia =

- City
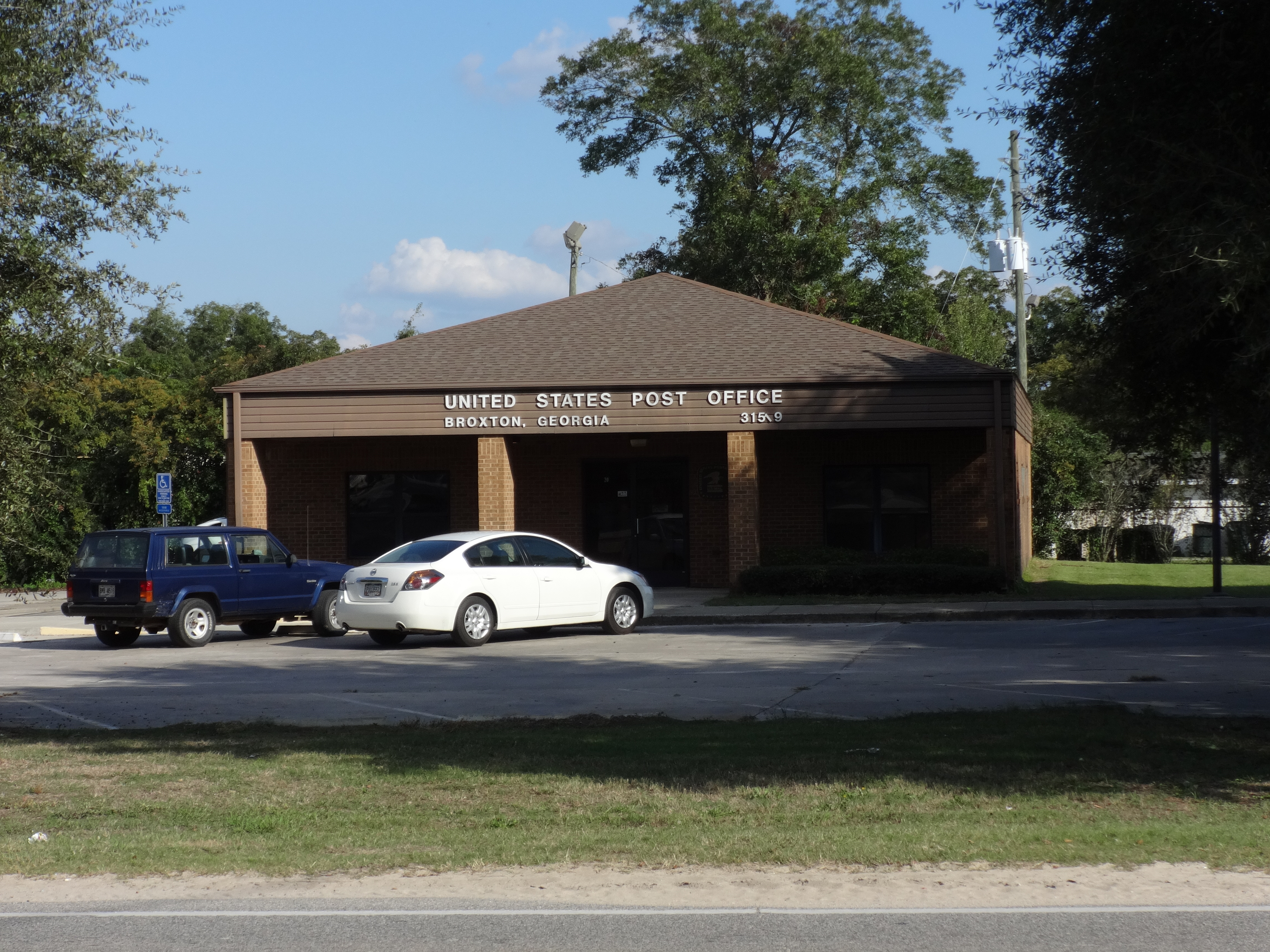
- Broxton Post Office

- Location in Coffee County and the state of Georgia
- Coordinates: 31°37′39″N 82°53′23″W
- Country: United States
- State: Georgia
- County: Coffee

Area
  - Total: 3.36 sq mi (8.70 km^{2})
  - Land: 3.25 sq mi (8.41 km^{2})
  - Water: 0.11 sq mi (0.29 km^{2})
- Elevation: 285 ft (87 m)

Population (2020)
  - Total: 1,060
  - Density: 326.5/sq mi (126.07/km^{2})
- Time zone: UTC-5 (Eastern (EST))
  - Summer (DST): UTC-4 (EDT)
- ZIP code: 31519
- Area code: 912
- FIPS code: 13-11504
- GNIS feature ID: 0354876
- Website: www.cityofbroxton.com

Broxton is a city in Coffee County, Georgia, United States. Per the 2020 census, the population was 1,060. It is known for its unique sandstone formation called Broxton Rocks along Rocky Creek 10 miles (16 km) north of town.

== History ==
An early variant name was "Gully Branch". The Georgia General Assembly incorporated the place as the "Town of Broxton" in 1904, with the corporate limits extending in a one-mile (1.6 km) radius from the front-yard well of one Jesse Lott. The present name is after Broxton Creek.

== Geography ==
Broxton is located in north-central Coffee County at 31°37′39″N 82°53′23″W (31.627415, -82.889709). U.S. Route 441 passes through the city, leading south 9 miles (14 km) to Douglas, the county seat, and north 33 miles (53 km) to McRae.

According to the United States Census Bureau, Broxton has a total area of 3.4 square miles (8.7 km^{2}), of which 3.2 square miles (8.4 km^{2}) is land and 0.12 square miles (0.3 km^{2}), or 3.58%, is water.

== Demographics ==
Historical population
Census	Pop.	Note	%±
1900	300		—
1910	1,040		246.7%
1920	696		−33.1%
1930	830		19.3%
1940	908		9.4%
1950	890		−2.0%
1960	907		1.9%
1970	957		5.5%
1980	1,117		16.7%
1990	1,211		8.4%
2000	1,428		17.9%
2010	1,189		−16.7%
2020	1,060		−10.8%
U.S. Decennial Census; 1850-1870 1870-1880; 1890-1910 1920-1930; 1940 1950 1960; 1970 1980 1990; 2000 2010

=== Racial and ethnic composition ===
Broxton city, Georgia – Racial and ethnic composition Note: the US Census treats Hispanic/Latino as an ethnic category. This table excludes Latinos from the racial categories and assigns them to a separate category. Hispanics/Latinos may be of any race.
Race / Ethnicity (NH = Non-Hispanic)	Pop 2000	Pop 2010	Pop 2020	% 2000	% 2010	% 2020
White alone (NH)	600	558	451	42.02%	46.93%	42.55%
Black or African American alone (NH)	709	499	445	49.65%	41.97%	41.98%
Native American or Alaska Native alone (NH)	4	2	0	0.28%	0.17%	0.00%
Asian alone (NH)	0	6	0	0.00%	0.50%	0.00%
Native Hawaiian or Pacific Islander alone (NH)	0	0	0	0.00%	0.00%	0.00%
Other race alone (NH)	0	0	2	0.00%	0.00%	0.19%
Mixed race or Multiracial (NH)	8	11	44	0.56%	0.93%	4.15%
Hispanic or Latino (any race)	107	113	118	7.49%	9.50%	11.13%
Total	1,428	1,189	1,060	100.00%	100.00%	100.00%

=== 2020 census ===
As of the 2020 census, Broxton had a population of 1,060. The median age was 38.9 years. 25.4% of residents were under the age of 18 and 15.8% of residents were 65 years of age or older. For every 100 females there were 90.3 males, and for every 100 females age 18 and over there were 87.9 males age 18 and over.

0.0% of residents lived in urban areas, while 100.0% lived in rural areas.

There were 436 households in Broxton, of which 31.9% had children under the age of 18 living in them. Of all households, 34.6% were married-couple households, 20.6% were households with a male householder and no spouse or partner present, and 37.8% were households with a female householder and no spouse or partner present. About 31.2% of all households were made up of individuals and 12.4% had someone living alone who was 65 years of age or older.

There were 508 housing units, of which 14.2% were vacant. The homeowner vacancy rate was 0.4% and the rental vacancy rate was 8.0%.
