= Relee, Georgia =

Unincorporated community in Georgia, U.S.

Coordinates: 31°45′40″N 82°55′59″W

Relee is an unincorporated community in Coffee County, in the U.S. state of Georgia.

== History ==
The community was named after Robert E. Lee (1807–1870), an American Civil War general.
