= Broxton Rocks =

Sandstone exposure in Broxton, Georgia, U.S.

- Stratigraphic range: Middle Miocene~42–5.2 Ma
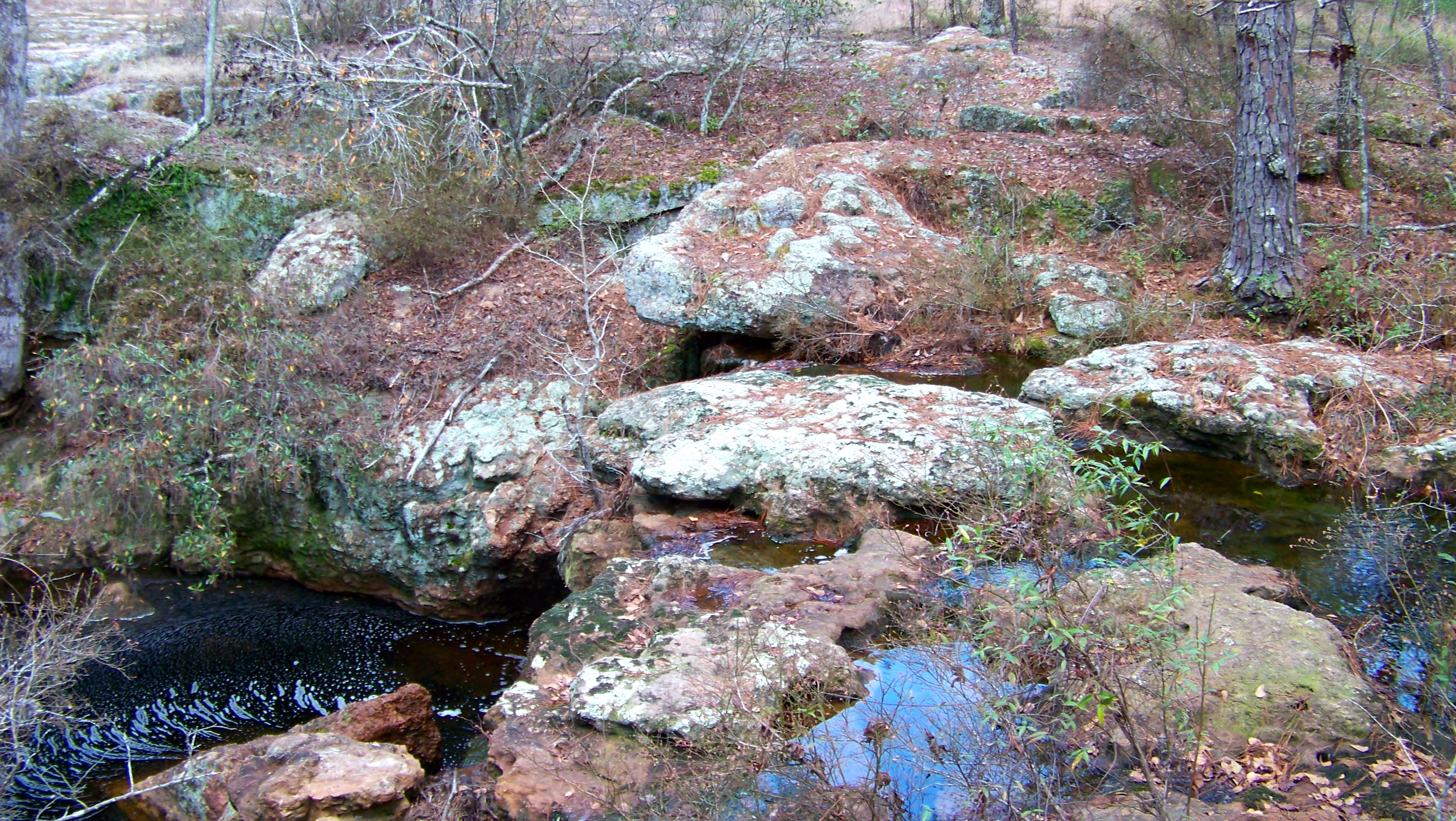
- Broxton Rocks Waterfall
- Type: Geological formation
- Unit of: Altamaha Formation
- Underlies: Atlantic coastal plain

Lithology
- Primary: Sandstone
- Other: Mudstone

Location
- Coordinates: 31.7323°N 82.8533°W
- Region: Broxton, Coffee County, Georgia
- Country: United States
- Extent: 4 miles (6.4 km)

Type section
- Named for: Broxton, Georgia
- Named by: Huddleston

Broxton Rocks is the single largest exposure of sandstone, about 4 miles in extent, found in the Altamaha Grit, a subterranean band of sandstone that lies under some 15,000 square miles (39,000 square kilometres) of the Atlantic Coastal Plain. The Rocks, as it is referred to locally, consists of a series of cracks, pools, damp cliff walls, a 10-foot (3.0-meter) waterfall, and rugged outcrops up to 20 feet (6.1 meters) high, all carved into a shallow gorge over many centuries by Rocky Creek. The Broxton Rocks waterfall is Georgia's southernmost. A substantial part of the Broxton Rocks is a protected preserve (Broxton Rocks Preserve) of 3,799 acres (1,537 hectares), of which 1,528 acres (618 hectares) are managed by The Nature Conservancy. The preserve lies on a direct line from Atlanta, Georgia, 185 miles by road to the north-west, to Jacksonville, Florida, 145 miles by road to the south-east. Broxton Rocks is located at 31°43'56.25"N, 82°51'11.75"W (31.7323°N, 82.8533°W). The elevation is 243 feet (74 meters). Broxton Rocks is located in north-east Coffee County, Georgia.

== Geology ==
Part of the Atlantic coastal plain, Broxton Rocks' sandstone layers were created by the slow erosion of the Altamaha Formation, dating from the Middle Miocene era. Fractures have opened up throughout the feature, some wide enough to allow a person to walk through, some narrow but deep. Where the waters of Rocky Creek, a first-order intermittent stream, drop to a lower level, a 10-foot (3.0-meter) waterfall has formed a pool in the sandstone before it flows out and through the lower reaches of the feature before draining into the Ocmulgee River.

== Flora and fauna ==
=== Plants ===
Broxton Rocks is the home to about 530 plant species, several of which are threatened or endangered species. Included among these are the green-fly orchid, grit portulaca, silky creeping morning glory, Georgia plume, filmy fern and shoestring fern. Some species found here were thought to be extinct; several found here grow almost exclusively in other climates such as the tropics or Appalachian Mountains. In spring, flower species like flame azaleas and fameflower bring a blaze of color to the ravine. The preserve lies in an area of longleaf pine ecosystem which once stretched from the Atlantic Ocean to the eastern reaches of Texas. The Nature Conservancy seeks to restore the longleaf pine to the lands it manages in the preserve through ecological restoration.

=== Animals ===
The preserve is home to over 100 species of birds. The near-threatened* Bachman's sparrow and the pileated woodpecker, whose drum-like peck can be heard over long distances, all nest here. Other animals include the armadillo, the woodrat, the flying squirrel, the vulnerable* gopher tortoise, and the threatened* indigo snake.

* Denotes species' conservation status

== Human history ==
Archaeological research shows that there was a Spanish-era (1568–1684) dwelling believed to belong to aboriginal peoples.

Broxton Rocks appears to have had several name changes in its history. Three decades ago it was more commonly known locally as simply The Rocks. Ward's History of Coffee County, published in 1930, pp 271, says of Broxton Rocks, "'The Picnic Rocks' - Its ruggedness begins with the great grey boulders of the picnic rocks, known in former times as "falling waters," for there was quite a water fall at this spot which was near the home of Major McNeill, one of the pioneer naval stores operators from Robeson County, North Carolina, who gave the place its name." He continues in the next paragraph, "From there on to the Ocmulgee River, there were two great cliffs lining each side of a wooded stretch through which this stream flowed, great grey boulders with crevasses in them, and others poised perilously on top of each other just as though there had been a great upheaval there in the days gone by." Ward appears to indicate that the local appellation for the feature was "The Picnic Rocks", but that a past name was "falling waters". Current research doesn't indicate if that was or was not a translation from an indigenous tongue, e.g. Creek or Seminole.
