= Douglas Municipal Airport (Georgia) =

Airport in Coffee County

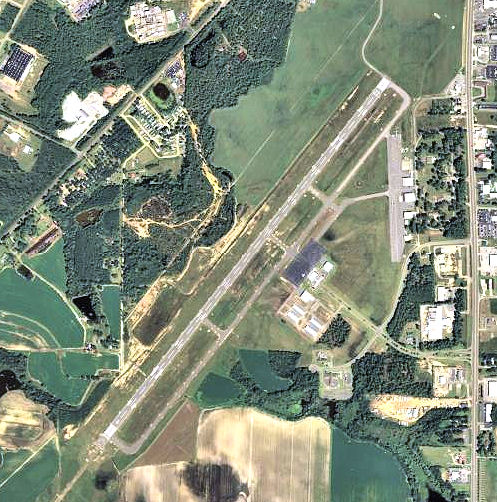
- 2006 USGS airphoto
- IATA: none; ICAO: KDQH; FAA LID: DQH

Summary
- Airport type: Public
- Owner: City of Douglas
- Serves: Douglas, Georgia
- Elevation AMSL: 257 ft (78 m)
- Coordinates: 31°28′36″N 82°51′38″W

Map
- Location of Douglas Municipal Airport

Runways
Direction	Length		Surface
Direction	ft	m	Surface
4/22	6,005	1,830	Asphalt

Statistics (2006)
- Aircraft operations: 21,000
- Source: Federal Aviation Administration

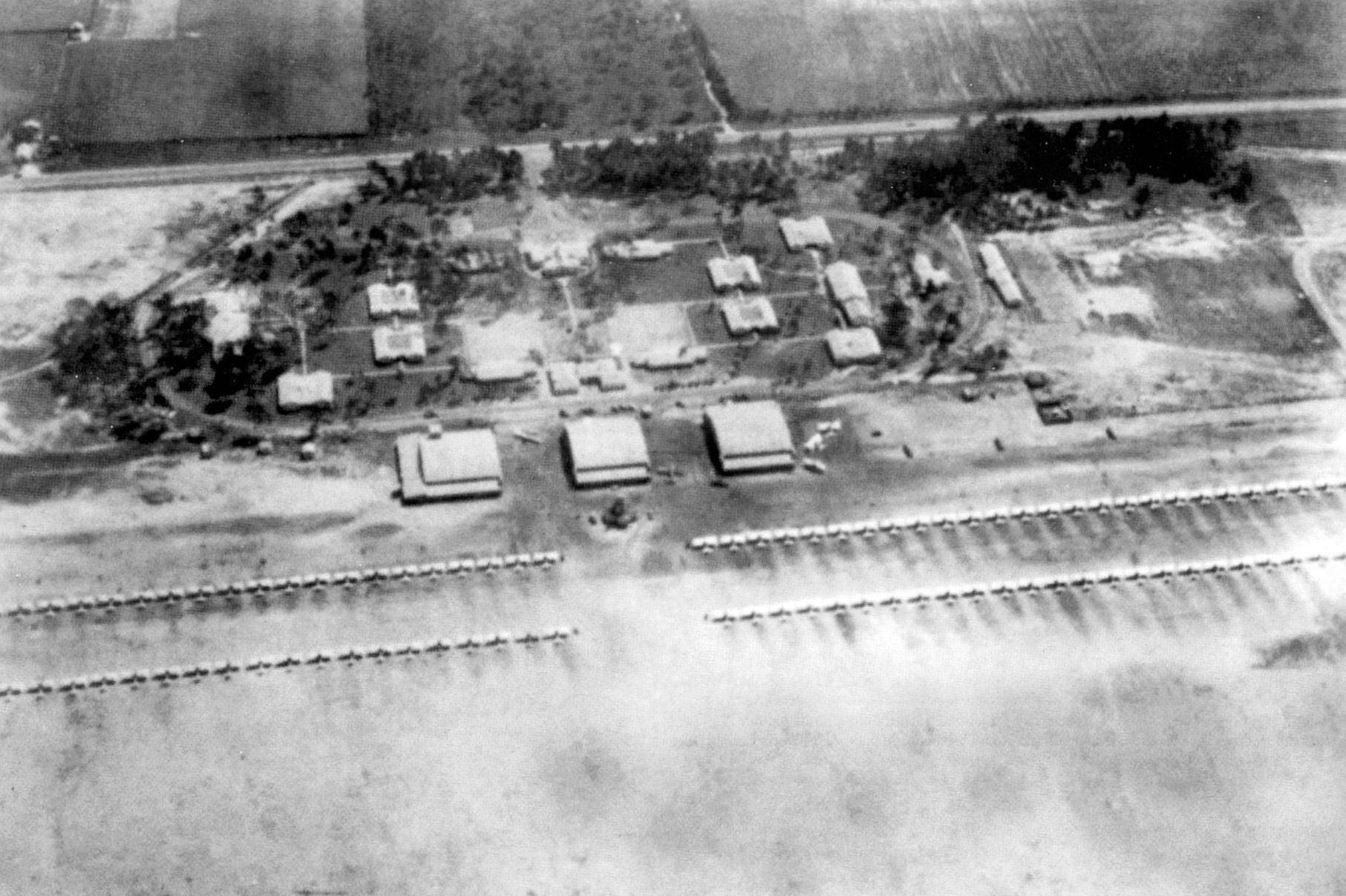
Station, hangars and aircraft ramp, about 1943

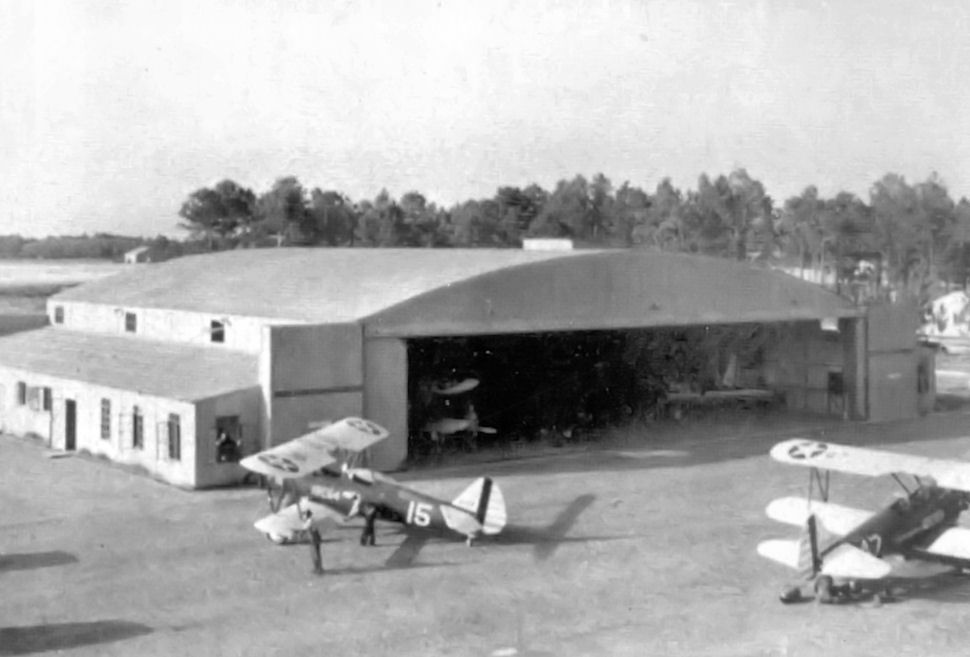
One of the hangars at Douglas AAF, about 1943

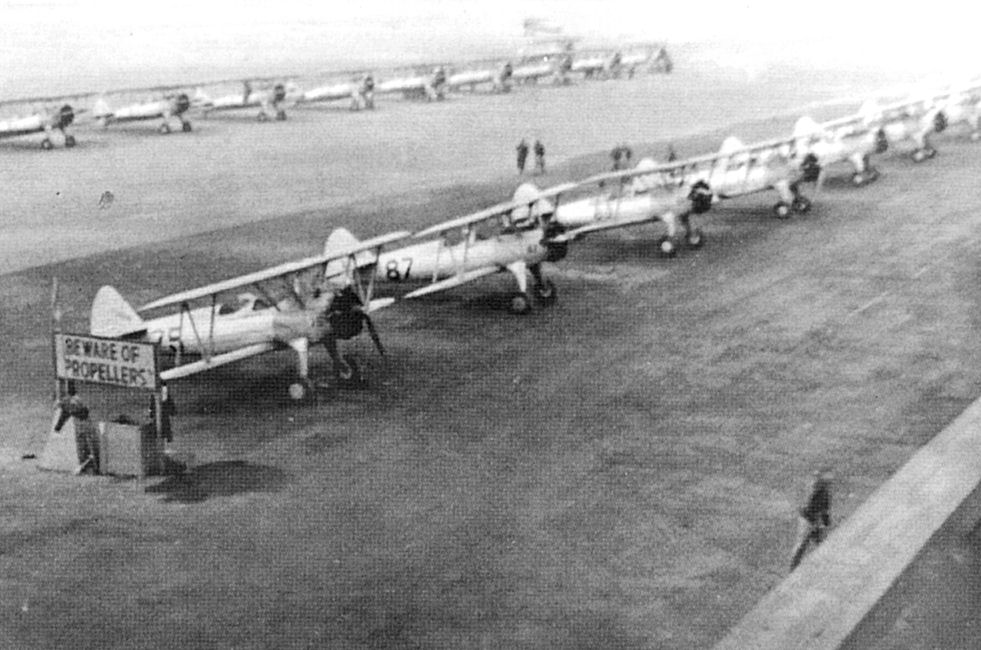
rows of PT-17 Boeing Stearmans at Douglas, about 1943

Douglas Municipal Airport (ICAO: KDQH, FAA LID: DQH) is a public airport located two miles (3 km) south of the central business district of Douglas, a city in Coffee County, Georgia, United States. It is owned by the City of Douglas.

Although most U.S. airports use the same three-letter location identifier for the FAA and IATA, Douglas Municipal Airport is assigned DQH by the FAA but has no designation from the IATA.

== Facilities and aircraft ==
Douglas Municipal Airport covers an area of 496 acres (201 ha) which contains one asphalt paved runway (4/22) measuring 6,005 x 100 ft (1,830 x 30 m). For the 12-month period ending March 29, 2006, the airport had 21,000 general aviation aircraft operations, an average of 57 per day.

== History ==
=== Origins ===
Aviation began in Douglas Georgia in 1928 when Dixie Airways opened a pilot school at the South Georgia College, a two-year or junior college. The institution claimed to be the only college in the United States with its own airport.

Wesley Newman Raymond, a World War I native of Nova Scotia, relocated to Macon, Georgia in 1936 where he owned an aircraft dealership and fixed-base operation. Raymond played a major role in the development of Macon's Herbert Smart Airport. In 1939, Raymond joined with Robert Richardson, forming the Raymond-Richardson Aviation Company. The new company established a Civil Pilot Training (CPT) flight school at the South Georgia College airport.

In early 1941, the United States Army Air Corps approached Raymond-Richardson about the possibility of operating a primary Contract Pilot School. The company preferred to locate the school at Macon, but too many other Air Corps activities already existed in the area. Douglas became the second choice because the company already had a school in place. The City of Douglas and Coffee County welcomed the proposal and floated a bond issue to finance a portion of the project. In May 1941, an additional 700 acres (2.8 km^{2}) were purchased to enlarge the airport. The construction of the cantonment area at Douglas Army Airfield was of concrete and tile buildings and began on 29 June 1941. The three hangars were constructed of steel. In addition to the main school at Douglas, the following auxiliary airfields were utilized:

- Tanner-Ewing Auxiliary Field 31°22′56″N 82°46′15″W
- Knight Auxiliary Field 31°56′10″N 82°48′03″W
- Dorminey Auxiliary Field 31°29′16″N 82°58′00″W
- Paulk Auxiliary Field 31°22′13″N 82°57′52″W

=== World War II ===
The Army Air Forces Training Command Eastern Flying Training Command's 63rd Army Air Force Flight Training Detachment was the Air Force unit assigned to Douglas AAF. The 63rd Army Air Forces Contract Pilot School received its first PT-17 Boeing Stearmans on 11 September 1941. The first class began on 7 October. With the start of the war, the Defense Plant Corporation bought the school. On 31 December 1941, the number of Stearmans present totaled 40.

By January 1942, eight barracks had been completed. With the start of the war, an expansion of the school's facilities began. Two auxiliary fields opened for operations in June and an enlargement of the ramp reached completion in July. By August, the Link trainer building, hangar No.3, additions to the mess hall, administration building, and flight control tower were ready for use. In October, two additional auxiliary fields and the gasoline storage tank were completed. By the end of 1942, the number of aircraft present had almost doubled to 78. Douglas had quite a distinction, in that the first class of the 1942 graduates from West Point received primary training here. Since the school did not have a swimming pool, cadets were allowed to use the pool at South Georgia State College, a short walk away.

As in every other primary Army school, peak training took place during 1943. The total number of flight cadets rose from 300 in January 1943 to 456 in November 1943. Likewise, the number of instructors increased from 78 to 120 and the number of aircraft peaked at 170. In December 1943, the reduction in flight training was beginning to make itself felt as the size of classes began to decrease. Training continued to decrease during 1944. After the last class graduated in December 1944, the school closed.

Following the war, the Reconstruction Finance Corporation utilized the airfield for the disposal of surplus Army and Navy aircraft.

=== Civil use ===
The Cincinnati Reds baseball team used the school for a spring training facility from 1954 to 1957. The buildings of the school were used for a variety of purposes over the years that included a corset factory, elementary school, mental health facility, agricultural research laboratory, and local headquarters of the Georgia Bureau of Investigation.

Today, the airfield is Douglas's municipal airport. Due to its substantial construction, the former cantonment area has many World War II buildings still in existence. Two of the original hangars also remain.

== See also ==
- Georgia World War II Army Airfields
- List of airports in Georgia (U.S. state)
- 29th Flying Training Wing (World War II)
