= West Green, Georgia =

Unincorporated community in Georgia, US

- Unincorporated community
- Location within the state of Georgia West Green (the United States)
- Coordinates: 31°36′47″N 82°44′5″W
- Country: United States
- State: Georgia
- County: Coffee
- Elevation: 259 ft (79 m)
- Time zone: UTC-5 (Eastern (EST))
  - Summer (DST): UTC-4 (EDT)
- GNIS feature ID: 356628

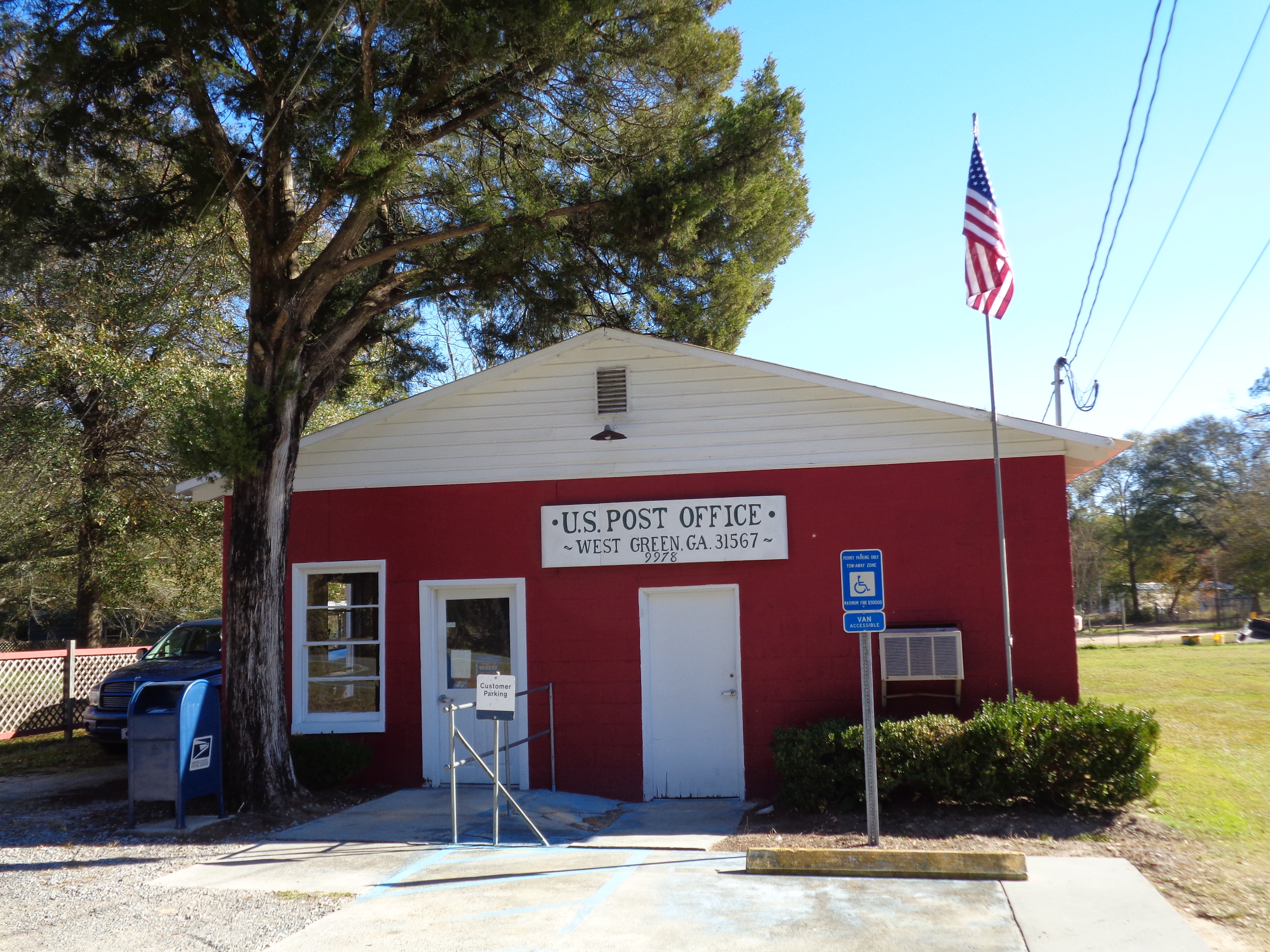
West Green Post Office

West Green is an unincorporated community in Coffee County, Georgia, United States. West Green is located along U.S. Route 221 northeast of Douglas and southwest of Lehigh near the Coffee-Jeff Davis County Line. The ZIP Code for West Green is 31567.

== History ==
West Green originally was known as The Twenty (due to being 20 miles south of Hazlehurst) and later named Garrant after the Garrant Lumber Company founded by Nathaniel Shelton Boyd.

The Georgia General Assembly incorporated West Green as a town in 1914. The town's municipal charter was repealed in 1995.
