= Bushnell, Georgia =

Unincorporated community in Georgia, U.S.

Coordinates: 31°33′37″N 82°57′36″W

Bushnell is an unincorporated community in Coffee County, in the U.S. state of Georgia.

== History ==
The community was named after G. L. Bush, a local politician. A post office called Bushnell was in operation from 1903 until 1922. The Georgia General Assembly incorporated the place as the "Town of Bushnell" in 1907, with the town corporate limits extending in a two-mile (3.2 km) radius from the Atlanta, Birming and Atlantic Railroad depot. The town's charter was legislatively repealed less than one year later in 1908.
