= Gaskin Avenue Historic District =

Historic district in Georgia, United States

- U.S. National Register of Historic Places
- U.S. Historic district
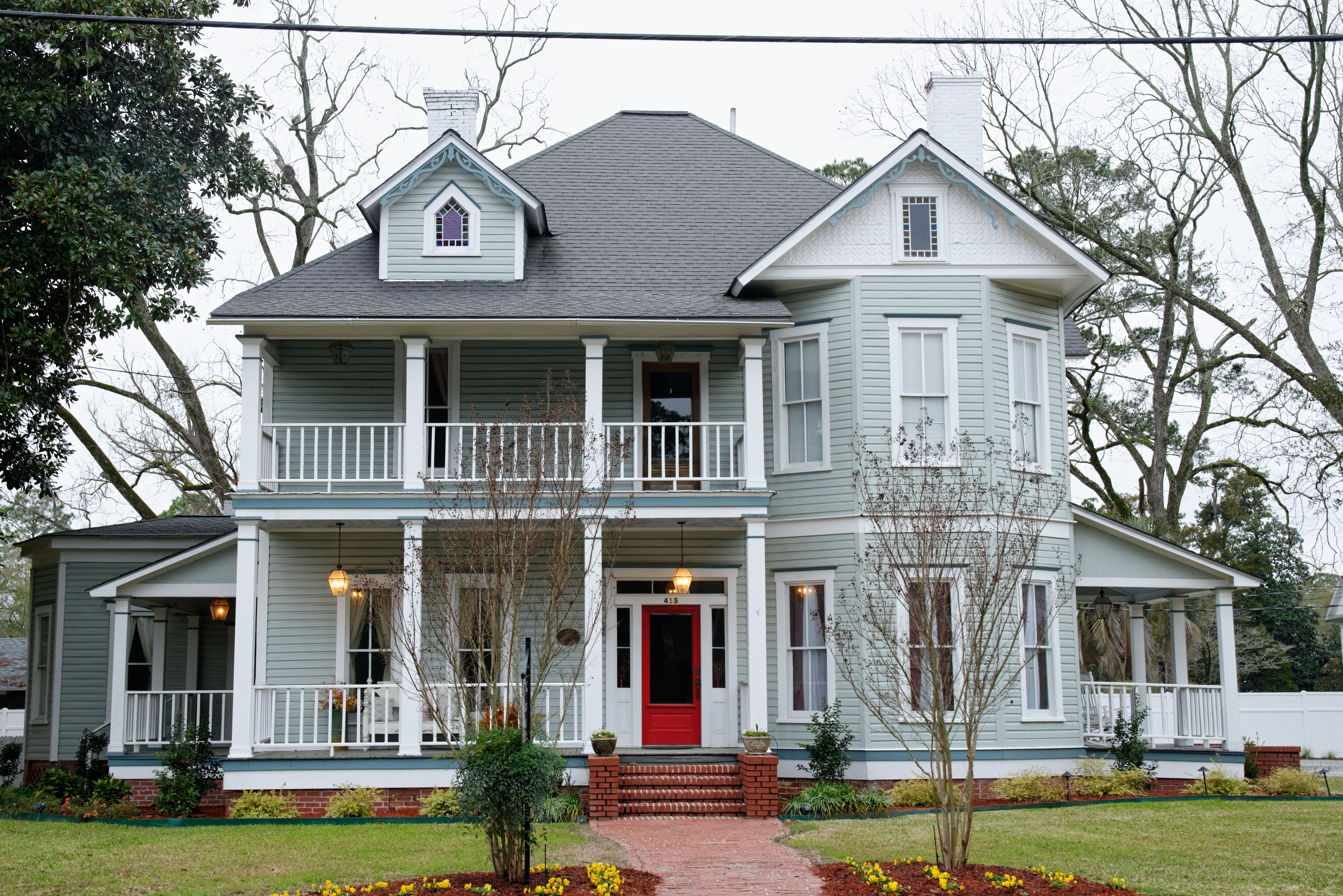
- McLean House, Gaskin Ave., built 1901

- Location within Georgia
- Location: Roughly bounded by Madison Ave., Wilson St., Pearl Ave., Gordon St., McDonald Ave., Atlantic Coastline RR and Coffee Ave, Douglas, Georgia
- Coordinates: 31.510556°N 82.844444°W
- Area: 200 acres (81 ha)
- Architectural style: Late 19th And 20th Century Revivals, Bungalow/craftsman, Queen Anne
- NRHP reference No.: 93001138
- Added to NRHP: October 21, 1993

The Gaskin Avenue Historic District, in Douglas in Coffee County, Georgia, is a 200 acres (0.81 km^{2}) historic district listed on the National Register of Historic Places in 1993. It contained 250 contributing buildings and 135 non-contributing ones.

It is roughly bounded by Madison Ave., Wilson St., Pearl Ave., Gordon St., McDonald Ave., the former Atlantic Coast Line Railroad, and Coffee Ave. The district is mostly residential, including historic houses built from c.1890 into the 1940s. Several large Queen Anne-style houses are included. It also includes a Colonial Revival-style Catholic church, a one-story former hospital which in 1993 was in use by the Coffee County Board of Education, and a local women's clubhouse. The district includes significant landscape architecture as well.
