= Nicholls, Georgia =

- City
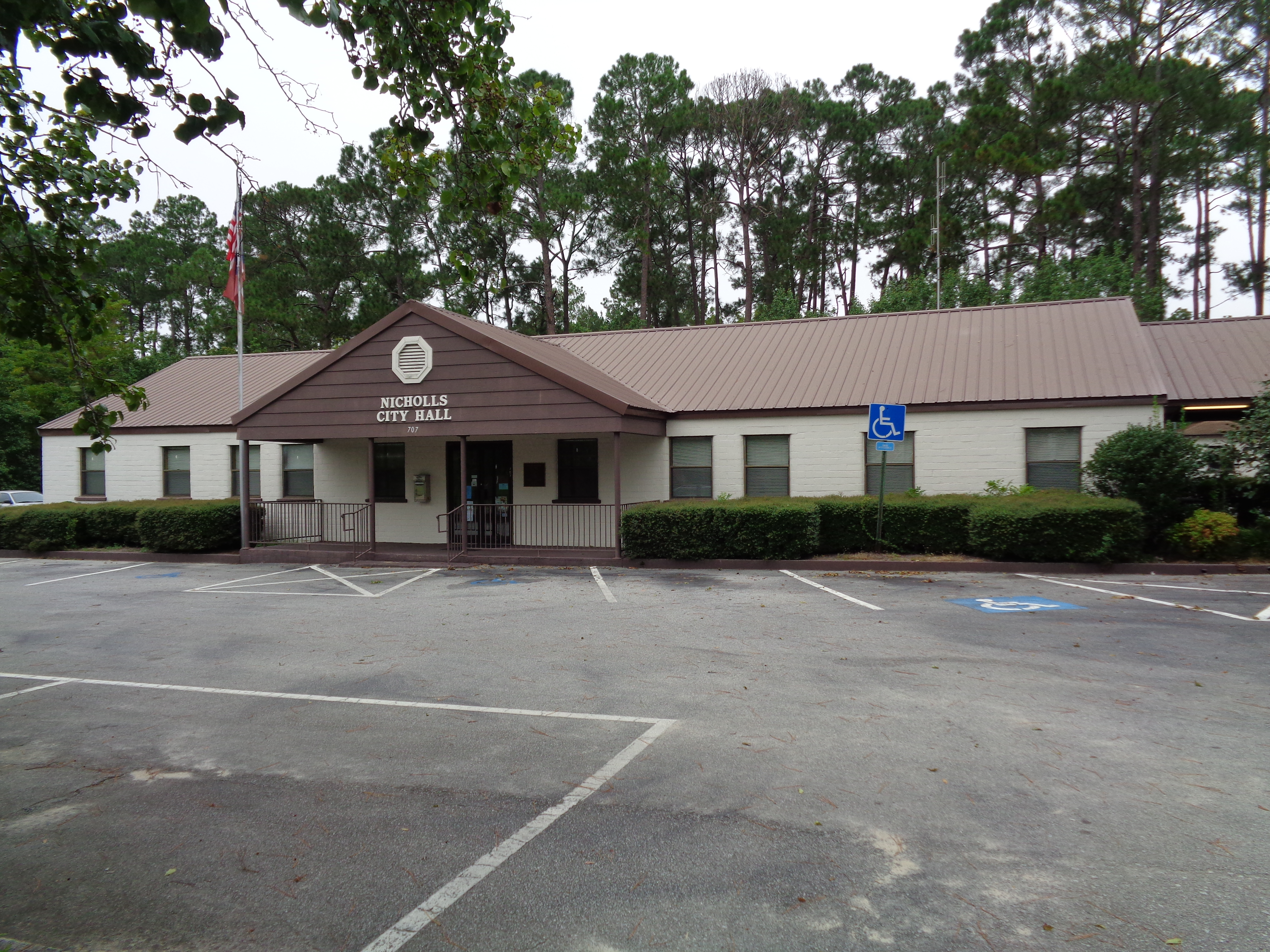
- Nicholls City Hall

- Location in Coffee County and the state of Georgia
- Coordinates: 31°31′1″N 82°38′16″W
- Country: United States
- State: Georgia
- County: Coffee

Area
  - Total: 2.05 sq mi (5.32 km^{2})
  - Land: 2.04 sq mi (5.29 km^{2})
  - Water: 0.012 sq mi (0.03 km^{2})
- Elevation: 190 ft (58 m)

Population (2020)
  - Total: 3,147
  - Density: 1,541/sq mi (594.8/km^{2})
- Time zone: UTC-5 (Eastern (EST))
  - Summer (DST): UTC-4 (EDT)
- ZIP code: 31554
- Area code: 912
- FIPS code: 13-55440
- GNIS feature ID: 0356428
- Website: https://cityofnichollsga.gov/

Nicholls is a city in Coffee County, Georgia, United States. As of the 2020 census, Nicholls had a population of 3,147. The population count includes residents of the Coffee County Correctional Facility within the city limits. This facility is privately owned and operated by CoreCivic.

The estimated city population as of 2018 was 3,338.

== History ==
Nicholls was founded in 1895. The city was named for John C. Nicholls, a U.S. Representative from Georgia.

== Geography ==
Nicholls is located near the eastern border of Coffee County at 31°31′1″N 82°38′16″W (31.516941, -82.637654). Georgia State Route 32 passes through the community, leading west 13 miles (21 km) to Douglas, the county seat, and east 10 miles (16 km) to Alma.

According to the United States Census Bureau, Nicholls has a total area of 1.9 square miles (4.8 km^{2}), of which 0.02 square miles (0.06 km^{2}), or 1.32%, is water.

Nicholls, Georgia is in the Wiregrass Region of the United States and inherits its topography and ecological diversity.

== Demographics ==
Historical population
Census	Pop.	Note	%±
1910	720		—
1920	936		30.0%
1930	651		−30.4%
1940	660		1.4%
1950	806		22.1%
1960	930		15.4%
1970	1,150		23.7%
1980	1,114		−3.1%
1990	1,003		−10.0%
2000	1,008		0.5%
2010	2,798		177.6%
2020	3,147		12.5%
U.S. Decennial Census

=== 2020 census ===
As of the 2020 census, Nicholls had a population of 3,147. The median age was 38.3 years. 6.7% of residents were under the age of 18 and 6.4% of residents were 65 years of age or older. For every 100 females there were 709.0 males, and for every 100 females age 18 and over there were 912.4 males age 18 and over.

0.0% of residents lived in urban areas, while 100.0% lived in rural areas.

There were 314 households in Nicholls, of which 38.5% had children under the age of 18 living in them. Of all households, 34.1% were married-couple households, 23.9% were households with a male householder and no spouse or partner present, and 36.9% were households with a female householder and no spouse or partner present. About 28.7% of all households were made up of individuals and 14.6% had someone living alone who was 65 years of age or older.

There were 381 housing units, of which 17.6% were vacant. The homeowner vacancy rate was 0.0% and the rental vacancy rate was 12.3%.

Racial composition as of the 2020 census
Race	Number	Percent
White	1,248	39.7%
Black or African American	1,821	57.9%
American Indian and Alaska Native	2	0.1%
Asian	4	0.1%
Native Hawaiian and Other Pacific Islander	4	0.1%
Some other race	38	1.2%
Two or more races	30	1.0%
Hispanic or Latino (of any race)	68	2.2%

=== 2000 census ===
As of the census of 2000, there were 1,008 people, 406 households, and 278 families residing in the city. The population density was 646.4 inhabitants per square mile (249.6/km^{2}). There were 500 housing units at an average density of 320.6 per square mile (123.8/km^{2}). The racial makeup of the city was 55.36% White, 43.55% African American, 0.40% Native American, 0.10% Asian, 0.50% from other races, and 0.10% from two or more races. Hispanic or Latino of any race were 1.19% of the population.

There were 406 households, out of which 31.0% had children under the age of 18 living with them, 42.4% were married couples living together, 21.7% had a female householder with no husband present, and 31.3% were non-families. 28.1% of all households were made up of individuals, and 15.5% had someone living alone who was 65 years of age or older. The average household size was 2.48 and the average family size was 3.02.

In the city, the population was spread out, with 28.5% under the age of 18, 9.6% from 18 to 24, 26.7% from 25 to 44, 21.9% from 45 to 64, and 13.3% who were 65 years of age or older. The median age was 35 years. For every 100 females, there were 85.6 males. For every 100 females age 18 and over, there were 81.6 males.

The median income for a household in the city was $21,750, and the median income for a family was $24,479. Males had a median income of $23,990 versus $18,750 for females. The per capita income for the city was $10,592. About 24.5% of families and 30.0% of the population were below the poverty line, including 37.7% of those under age 18 and 33.9% of those age 65 or over.

== Arena ==
The Wiregrass Arena is located in Nicholls. It is the home of many agricultural events as well as Nicholls Founders Day, an annual festival.
