= Broxton Creek =

Stream in Georgia, U.S.

Coordinates: 31°33′19″N 82°50′22″W

Broxton Creek is a stream in the U.S. state of Georgia. It is a tributary to the Seventeen Mile River.

Broxton Creek most likely was named after Henry Broxton, a pioneer citizen. A variant name is "Braxton Creek".
