= Downtown Douglas Historic District =

Historic district in Georgia, United States

- U.S. National Register of Historic Places
- U.S. Historic district
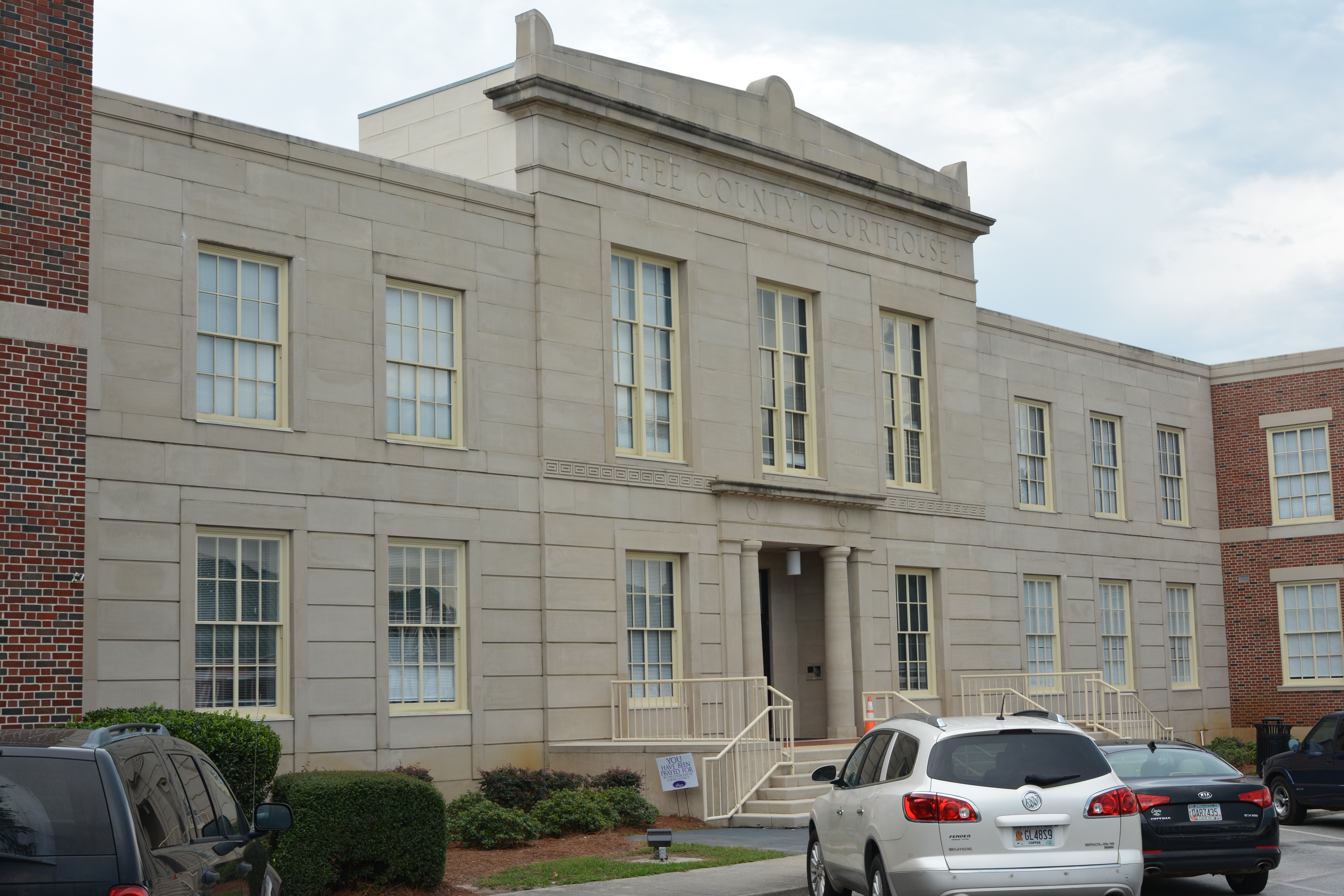
- Coffee County Courthouse

- Location within Georgia
- Location: Roughly bounded by Jackson St., Pearl Ave., Cherry St. and the Georgia-Florida RR tracks, Douglas, Georgia
- Area: 30 acres (12 ha)
- Built: 1910
- Architect: Chase, William J.J.
- Architectural style: Italianate, Queen Anne, Classical Revival
- NRHP reference No.: 93000941
- Added to NRHP: September 9, 1993

The Downtown Douglas Historic District is located in Douglas, Georgia and was added to the National Register of Historic Places in 1993. It is roughly bounded by Jackson Street, Pearl Avenue, Cherry Street, and the Georgia-Florida Railroad.

The buildings include a variety of styles of architecture, including Italianate, Queen Anne, Classical Revival, Italian Renaissance, Moderne, and Art Deco. The buildings have brick foundations whereas the walls are brick, stucco, stone, or weatherboard. Most of the buildings are attached and are one, two, or three stories tall. The highest concentration is along Peterson Avenue (north-south) and Ward Street (east-west). The Union Banking Company Building is itself on the National Register. The Martin Theater (now Martin Centre) was built in 1940 and is a good example of Moderne style. The county courthouse and the old post office are two remaining historical governmental buildings. The courthouse was built in 1940 in the Art Deco style to replace the courthouse which burned in 1938. A 1911 Confederate memorial stands at the courthouse. Some historic buildings related to the railroad remain.
