= Union Banking Company Building =

- U.S. National Register of Historic Places
- U.S. Historic district – Contributing property
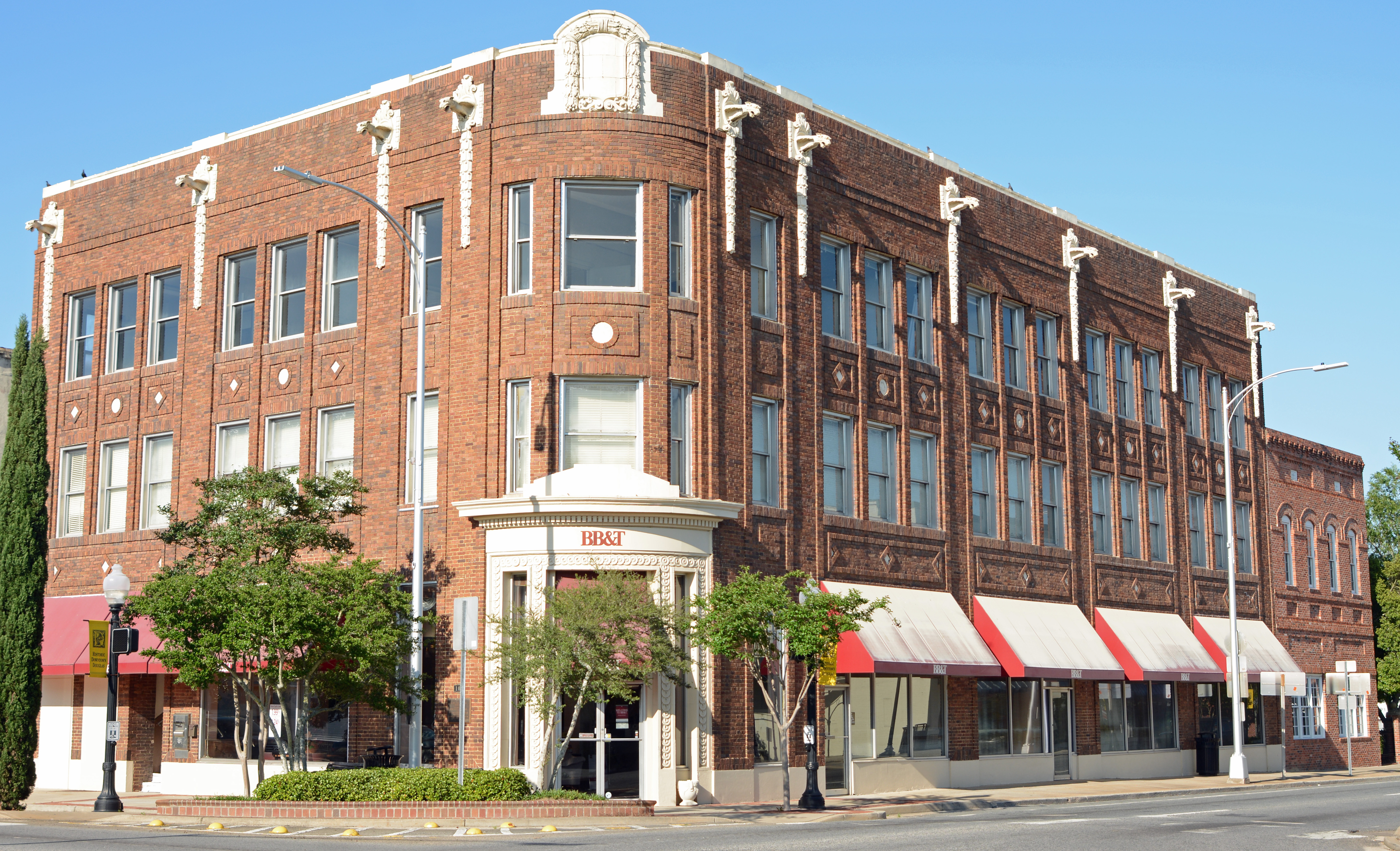

- Location within Georgia Location within the United States
- Location: 102 Peterson Ave., Douglas, Georgia
- Coordinates: 31°30′32.5″N 82°51′0″W
- Area: 0.2 acres (0.081 ha)
- Built: 1910
- Architect: McEachren, R. N.
- Architectural style: Early Commercial
- Part of: Downtown Douglas Historic District (ID93000941)
- NRHP reference No.: 82000144
- Added to NRHP: December 10, 1982

The Union Banking Company Building (also known as the Coffee County Bank) is a historic three-story brick building in Douglas, Georgia. The building was built in 1910-11 and has two facades facing streets, which include ten distinctive terracotta gargoyles. It is located at the intersection of Peterson Avenue (U.S. Route 441 southbound) and Ward Street (Georgia State Route 32 westbound).

== History ==
The building was built by the Union Banking Company, but it closed in 1930, along with many other banks. The Coffee County Bank was started in 1931 and used the building, which it later bought. It is now a BB&T but they will vacate the property moving down the street to their other location in February 2016. The building was added to the National Register of Historic Places (NRHP) on December 10, 1982. It is also a contributing building to the 1993 NRHP Downtown Douglas Historic District.

== Photos ==
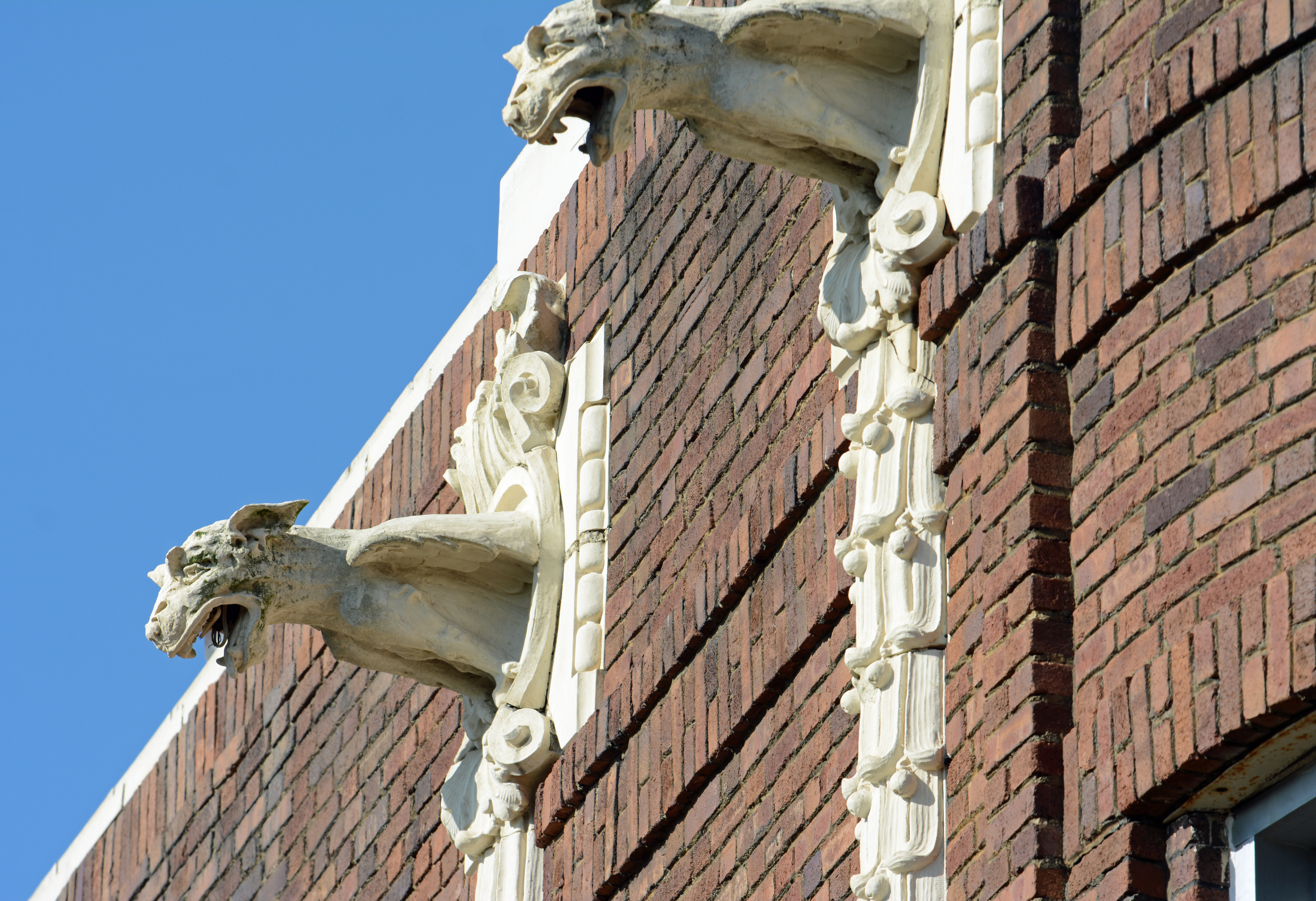
Two gargoyles

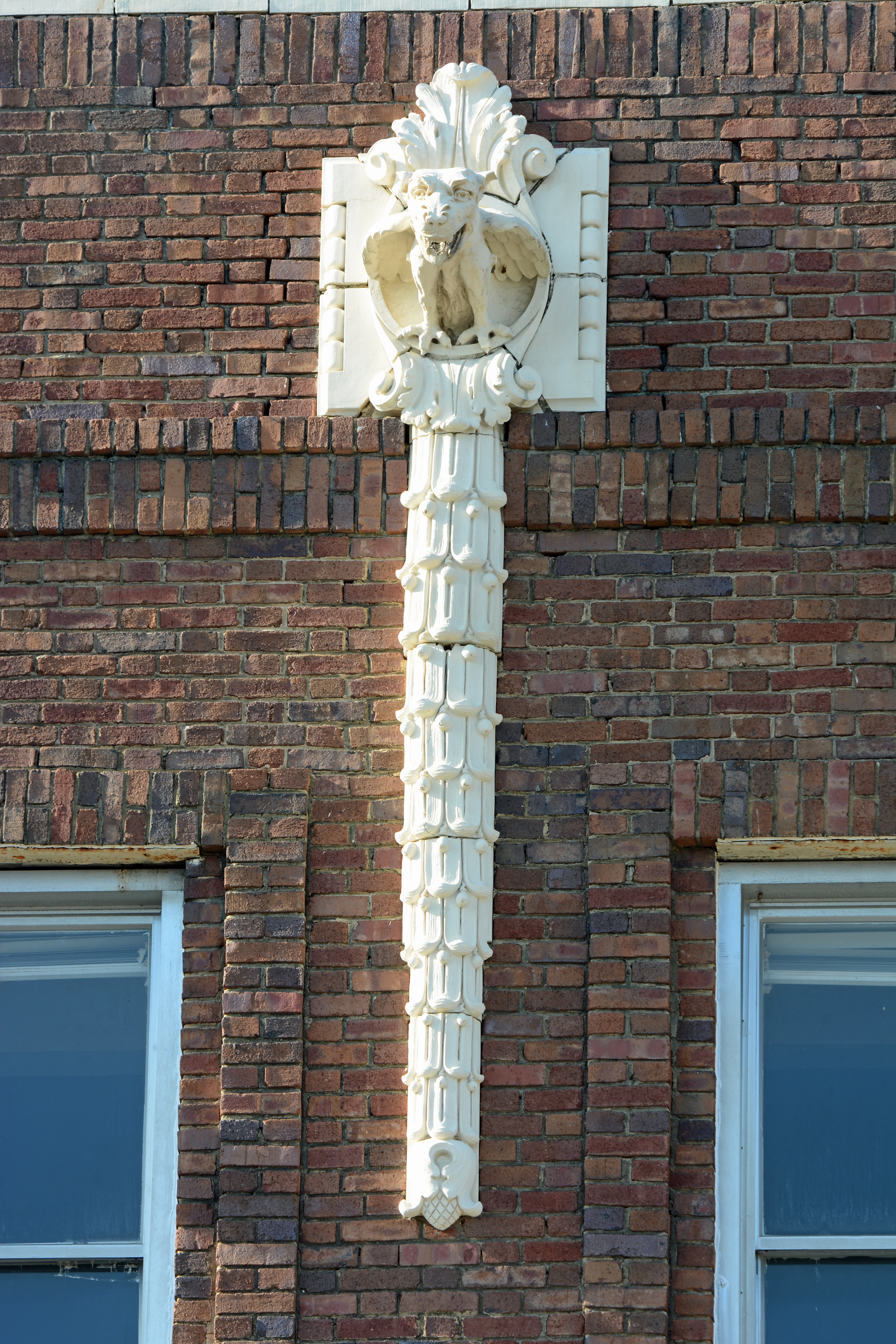
gargoyle

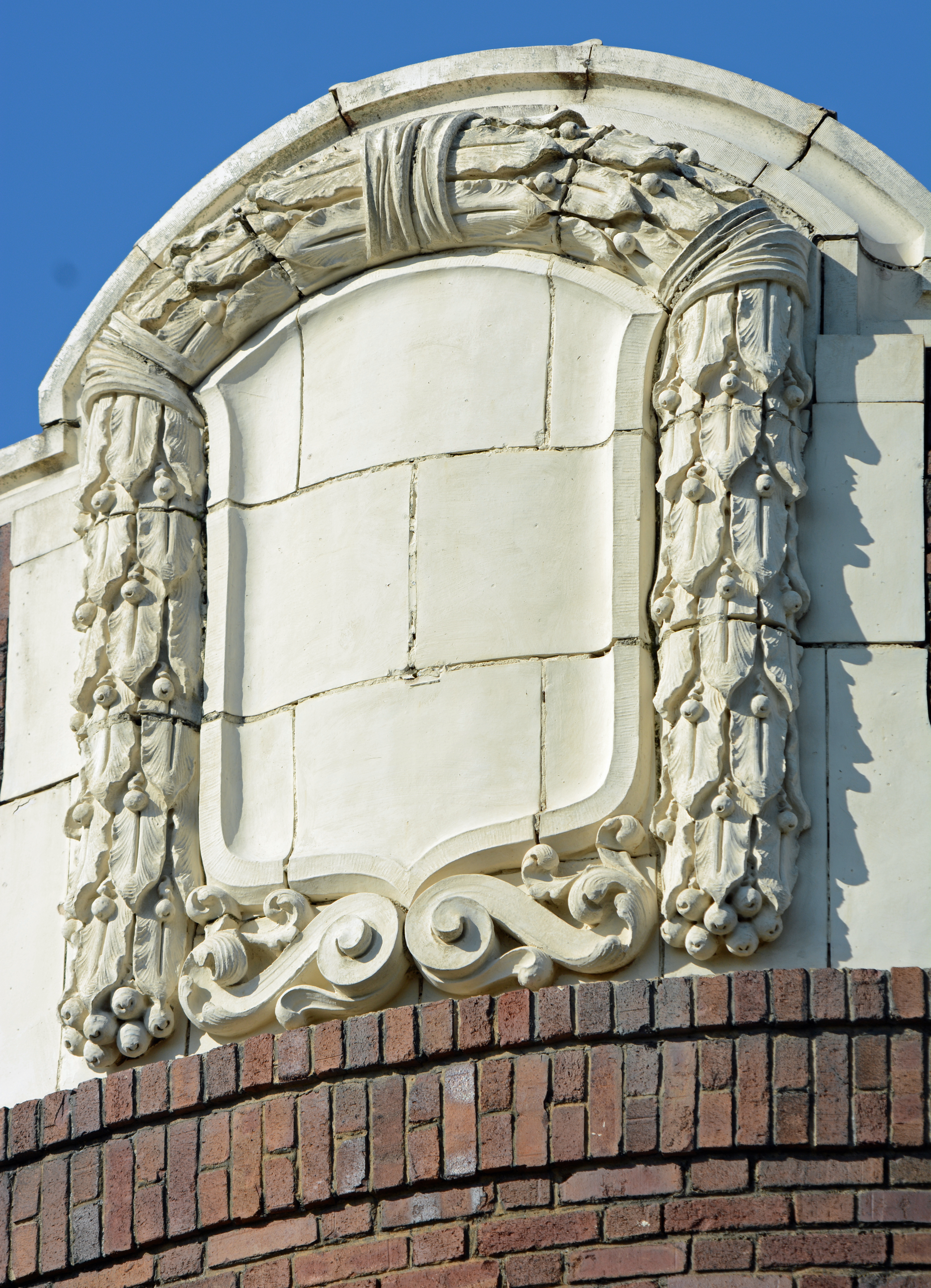
The top corner of the two street facades

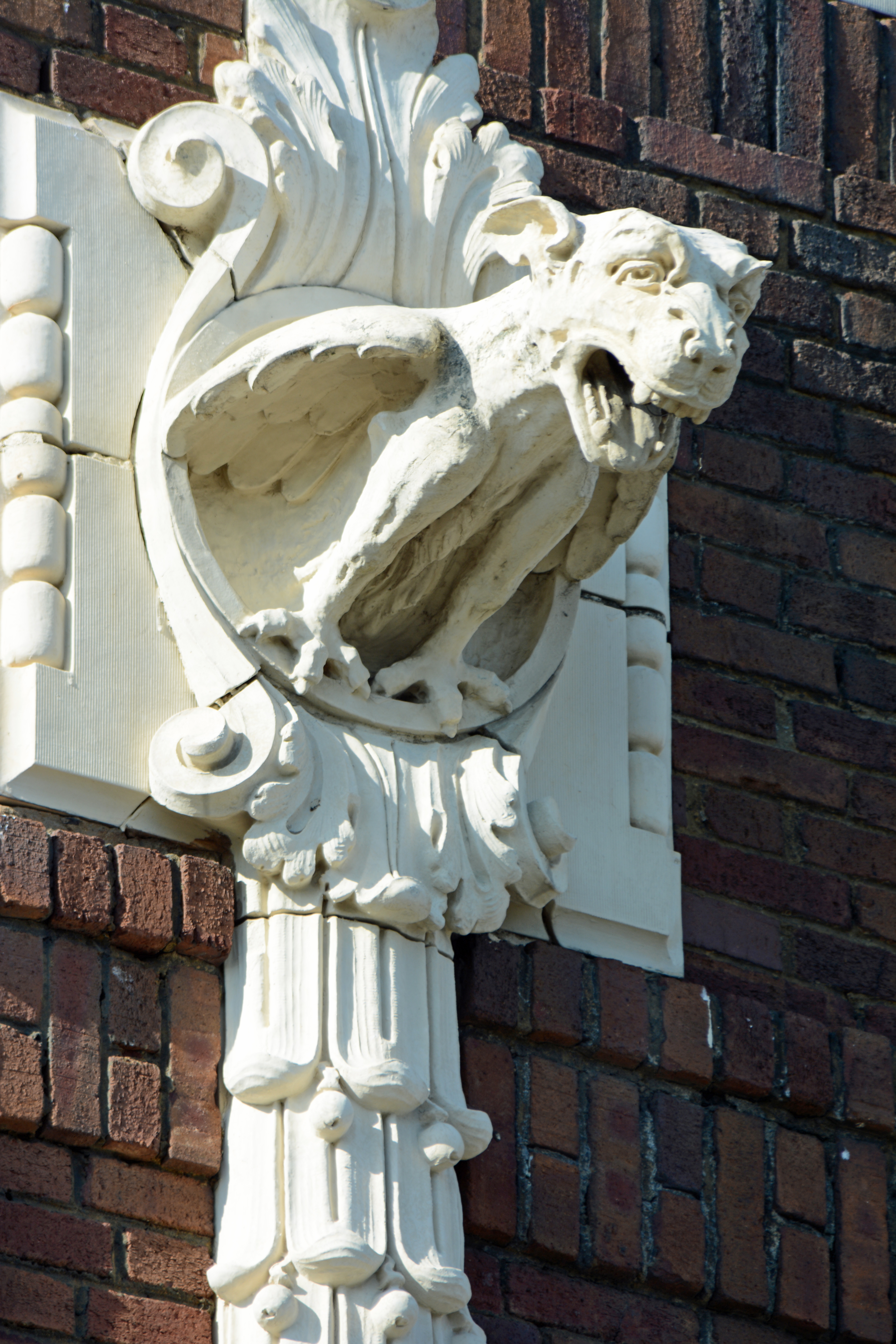
Close-up of a gargoyle

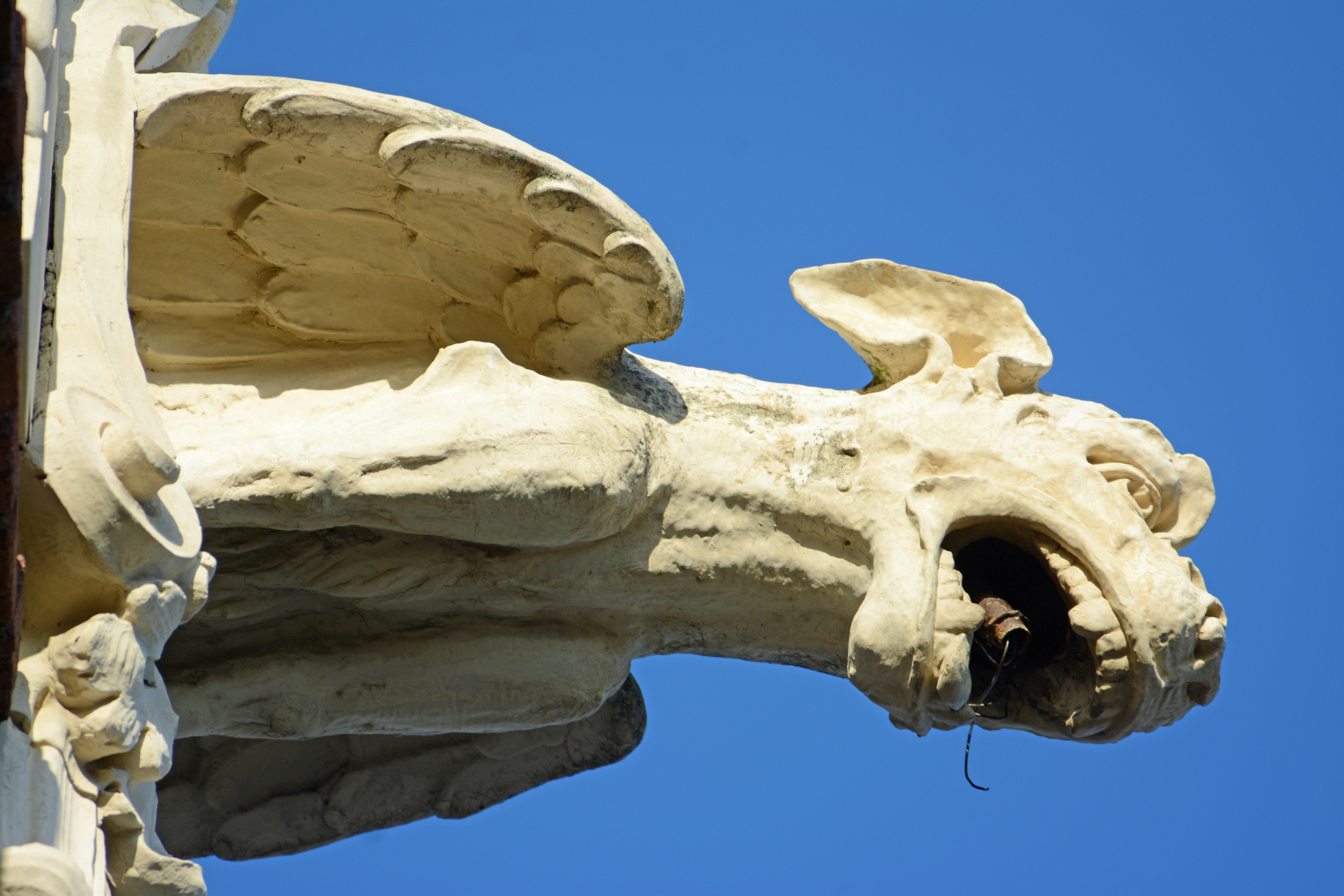
Side view

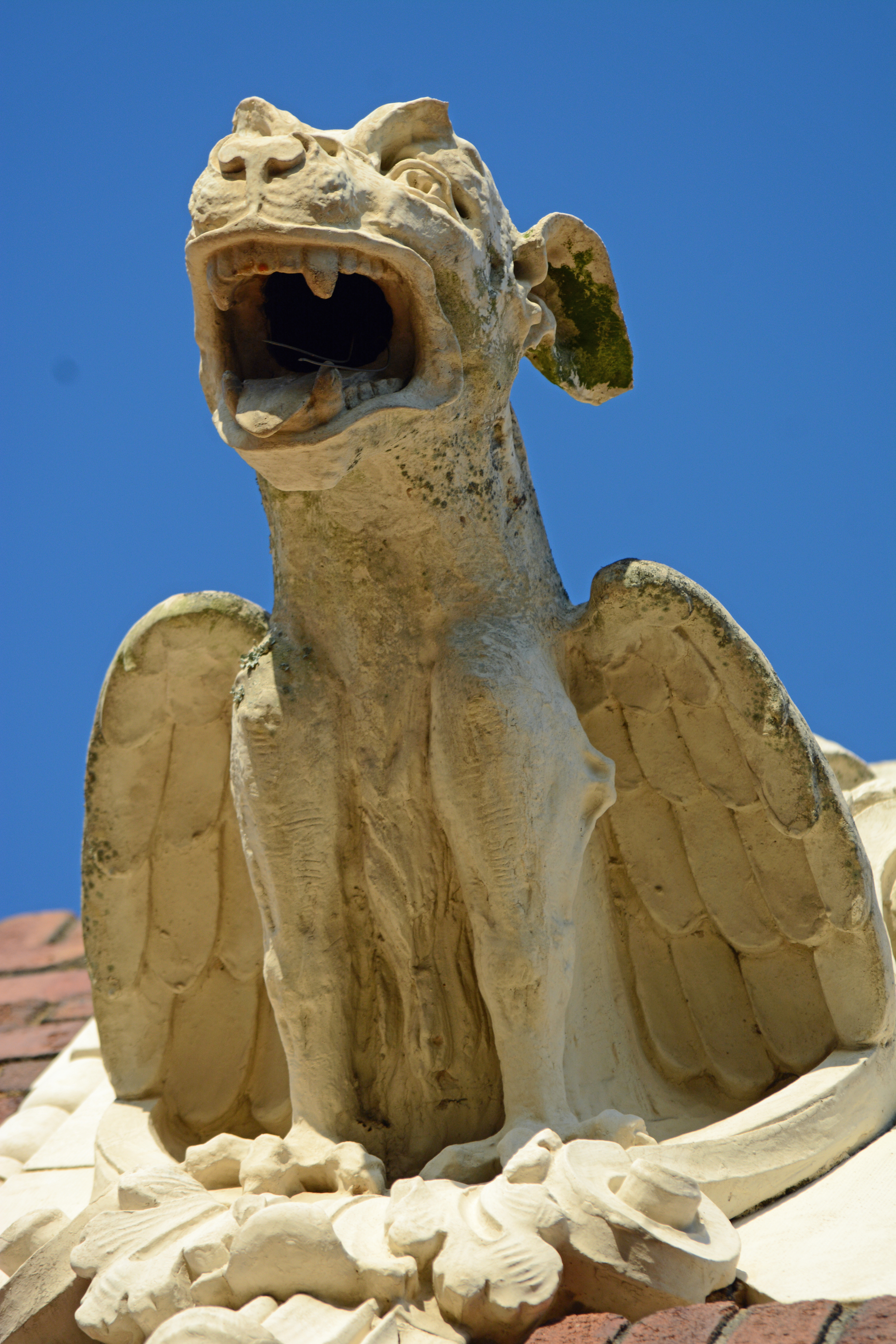
Underneath
