= Coffee County, Georgia =

County in Georgia, United States

- County
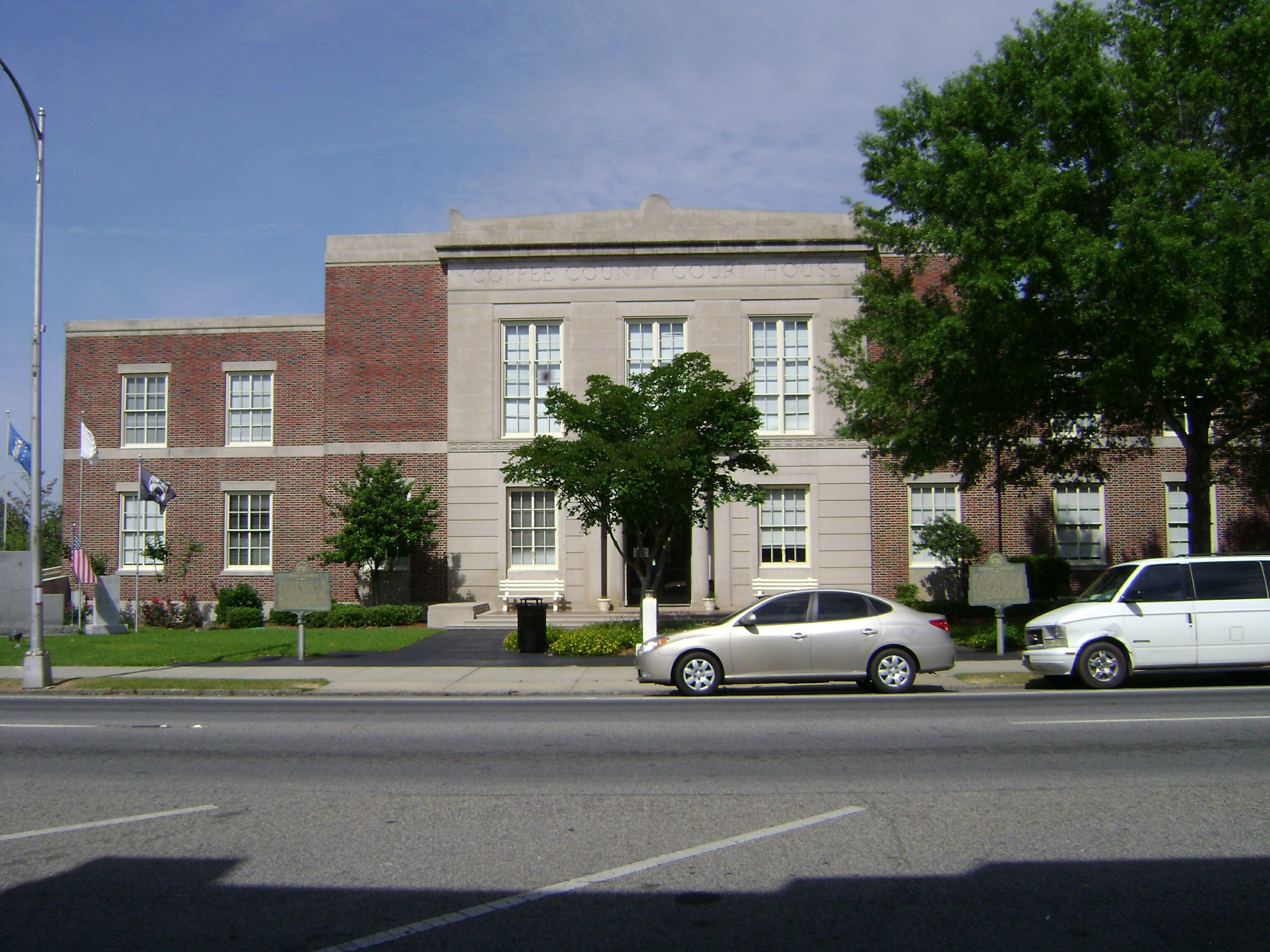
- Coffee County Courthouse in Douglas

- Logo

- Location within the U.S. state of Georgia
- Coordinates: 31°33′N 82°51′W
- Country: United States
- State: Georgia
- Founded: February 9, 1854; 172 years ago
- Named for: John E. Coffee
- Seat: Douglas
- Largest city: Douglas

Area
  - Total: 603 sq mi (1,560 km^{2})
  - Land: 575 sq mi (1,490 km^{2})
  - Water: 28 sq mi (73 km^{2}) 4.6%

Population (2020)
  - Total: 43,092
  - Estimate (2025): 44,407 ▲
  - Density: 74/sq mi (29/km^{2})
- Time zone: UTC−5 (Eastern)
  - Summer (DST): UTC−4 (EDT)
- Congressional district: 8th
- Website: coffeecounty-ga.gov

Coffee County is a county located in the southern portion of the U.S. state of Georgia. As of the 2020 census, the population was 43,092, up from 42,356 at the 2010 census. The county seat is Douglas.

Coffee County comprises the Douglas, Georgia micropolitan statistical area.

== History ==
Coffee County was created by an act of the Georgia General Assembly on February 9, 1854, from portions of Clinch, Irwin, Telfair, and Ware counties. These lands were originally ceded by the Creek in the Treaty of Fort Jackson in (1814) and the Treaty of the Creek Agency (1818) and apportioned to the above counties before becoming Coffee County.

Berrien (1856), Jeff Davis (1905), and Atkinson (1917) counties were subsequently formed from sections of Coffee County.

The county is named for General John E. Coffee, a state legislator and a U.S. representative.

Coffee County Correctional Facility is located in Nicholls, Georgia. It is privately owned and operated by CoreCivic, the largest prison company in the nation.

Many of the early settlers of what is now Coffee County are buried in historic cemeteries across the region, including the cemetery at Lone Hill United Methodist Church—located at 6833 Broxton-West Green Highway, some 10 miles northeast of Douglas. The church and its cemetery date to the 1840s, with the earliest marked grave dated 1848. A majestic Eastern Redcedar has graced the cemetery for generations and is recognized as the nation's largest of this species through American Forests’ Champion Trees program. (see:) In July 2018 the tree was recognized as 2018's Great American Tree by American Grove. (See:) Having been nominated by Mark McClellan of the Georgia Forestry Commission, the tree has been featured in such publications as the Smithsonian Magazine and Janisse Ray's Wild Card Quilt. The circumference of the tree exceeds 20 feet.

== Geography ==
According to the U.S. Census Bureau, the county has a total area of 603 square miles (1,560 km^{2}), of which 575 square miles (1,490 km^{2}) is land and 28 square miles (73 km^{2}) (4.6%) is water.

The vast majority of Coffee County is located in the Satilla River sub-basin of the St. Marys-Satilla River basin. The northern corner of the county, well north of Broxton, an area bisected by State Route 107, is located in the Lower Ocmulgee River sub-basin of the Altamaha River basin. The very southwestern corner of Coffee County, northeast of Alapaha, is located in the Alapaha River sub-basin of the Suwannee River basin.

=== Highways ===
- U.S. Route 221
- U.S. Route 319
- U.S. Route 441 / State Route 31
- State Route 32
- State Route 64
- State Route 90
- State Route 107
- State Route 135
- State Route 158
- State Route 206
  - State Route 206 Connector
- State Route 268

=== Adjacent counties ===
- Telfair County – north
- Jeff Davis County – northeast
- Bacon County – east
- Ware County – southeast
- Atkinson County – south
- Berrien County – southwest
- Irwin County – west
- Ben Hill County – west

=== Communities ===
==== Cities ====
- Ambrose
- Broxton
- Douglas
- Nicholls

==== Unincorporated communities ====
- Bethel
- Blystone
- Bridgetown
- Broxton Junction
- Bushnell
- Chatterton
- Fales (portion)
- Green Acres
- Huffer
- Lax (portion)
- Lehigh
- Lotts
- Mora
- Oak Park
- Pridgen
- Relee
- Saginaw
- Sapps Still
- Stokesville (portion)
- Upton
- West Green
- Wilsonville

== Demographics ==
Historical population
Census	Pop.	Note	%±
1860	2,879		—
1870	3,192		10.9%
1880	5,070		58.8%
1890	10,483		106.8%
1900	16,169		54.2%
1910	21,953		35.8%
1920	18,653		−15.0%
1930	19,739		5.8%
1940	21,541		9.1%
1950	23,961		11.2%
1960	21,953		−8.4%
1970	22,828		4.0%
1980	26,894		17.8%
1990	29,592		10.0%
2000	37,413		26.4%
2010	42,356		13.2%
2020	43,092		1.7%
2025 (est.)	44,407	▲	3.1%
U.S. Decennial Census; 1790-1880 1890-1910; 1920-1930 1930-1940; 1940-1950 1960-1980; 1980-2000 2010 2020

=== Racial and ethnic composition ===
Coffee County, Georgia – Racial and ethnic composition Note: the US Census treats Hispanic/Latino as an ethnic category. This table excludes Latinos from the racial categories and assigns them to a separate category. Hispanics/Latinos may be of any race.
Race / Ethnicity (NH = Non-Hispanic)	Pop 1980	Pop 1990	Pop 2000	Pop 2010	Pop 2020	% 1980	% 1990	% 2000	% 2010	% 2020
White alone (NH)	19,824	21,406	24,701	25,907	24,158	73.71%	72.34%	66.02%	61.16%	56.06%
Black or African American alone (NH)	6,730	7,484	9,629	11,227	11,872	25.02%	25.29%	25.74%	26.51%	27.55%
Native American or Alaska Native alone (NH)	18	31	98	87	62	0.07%	0.10%	0.26%	0.21%	0.14%
Asian alone (NH)	31	109	204	302	299	0.12%	0.37%	0.55%	0.71%	0.69%
Native Hawaiian or Pacific Islander alone (NH)	x	x	9	9	14	x	x	0.02%	0.02%	0.03%
Other race alone (NH)	41	5	14	46	69	0.15%	0.02%	0.04%	0.11%	0.16%
Mixed race or Multiracial (NH)	x	x	208	426	1,188	x	x	0.56%	1.01%	2.76%
Hispanic or Latino (any race)	250	557	2,550	4,352	5,430	0.93%	1.88%	6.82%	10.27%	12.60%
Total	26,894	29,592	37,413	42,356	43,092	100.00%	100.00%	100.00%	100.00%	100.00%

=== 2020 census ===
As of the 2020 census, the county had a population of 43,092; there were 15,277 households and 9,913 families residing in the county. Of the residents, 24.8% were under the age of 18 and 13.9% were 65 years of age or older; the median age was 36.6 years. For every 100 females there were 104.0 males, and for every 100 females age 18 and over there were 104.2 males. 33.1% of residents lived in urban areas and 66.9% lived in rural areas.

The racial makeup of the county was 59.0% White, 27.8% Black or African American, 0.5% American Indian and Alaska Native, 0.7% Asian, 0.1% Native Hawaiian and Pacific Islander, 6.9% from some other race, and 5.0% from two or more races. Hispanic or Latino residents of any race comprised 12.6% of the population.

There were 15,277 households in the county, of which 35.4% had children under the age of 18 living with them and 31.3% had a female householder with no spouse or partner present. About 25.6% of all households were made up of individuals and 10.3% had someone living alone who was 65 years of age or older.

There were 17,331 housing units, of which 11.9% were vacant. Among occupied housing units, 63.9% were owner-occupied and 36.1% were renter-occupied. The homeowner vacancy rate was 1.2% and the rental vacancy rate was 8.9%.

== Education ==
Douglas is home to South Georgia State College, the oldest two-year institution under the University System of Georgia.

== Politics ==
As of the 2020s, Coffee County is a Republican stronghold, voting 72% for Donald Trump in 2024. Like most of the Solid South, Coffee County voted with the Democrats until 1964, when Republican Barry Goldwater carried the county as well as the state. Democrat Jimmy Carter, who came from Georgia, carried the county twice. No Democrat has carried the county since then. Bill Clinton was the last Democrat to get over forty percent of the county's vote, in 1996. His two bids for president are the only times since Carter that a Democrat has kept the margin within single digits, and Michael Dukakis is the only other Democrat since Carter to garner 40 percent of the county's vote.

For elections to the United States House of Representatives, Coffee County is part of Georgia's 8th congressional district, currently represented by Austin Scott. For elections to the Georgia State Senate, Coffee County is part of Districts 13 and 19. For elections to the Georgia House of Representatives, Coffee County is part of Districts 169 and 176.

United States presidential election results for Coffee County, Georgia
Year	Republican		Democratic		Third party(ies)	
Year	No.	%	No.	%	No.	%
1912	28	2.78%	895	88.79%	85	8.43%
1916	120	5.36%	2,091	93.35%	29	1.29%
1920	230	35.06%	426	64.94%	0	0.00%
1924	62	9.54%	510	78.46%	78	12.00%
1928	591	33.45%	1,176	66.55%	0	0.00%
1932	29	1.70%	1,652	97.06%	21	1.23%
1936	116	6.38%	1,702	93.57%	1	0.05%
1940	128	7.56%	1,561	92.15%	5	0.30%
1944	366	18.38%	1,625	81.62%	0	0.00%
1948	309	7.46%	3,168	76.45%	667	16.10%
1952	1,078	24.67%	3,292	75.33%	0	0.00%
1956	574	15.21%	3,199	84.79%	0	0.00%
1960	987	22.62%	3,376	77.38%	0	0.00%
1964	4,392	61.76%	2,719	38.24%	0	0.00%
1968	1,241	19.52%	1,331	20.94%	3,785	59.54%
1972	3,934	86.63%	607	13.37%	0	0.00%
1976	1,417	23.55%	4,601	76.45%	0	0.00%
1980	2,499	37.74%	4,038	60.99%	84	1.27%
1984	4,200	61.47%	2,633	38.53%	0	0.00%
1988	4,019	58.91%	2,777	40.71%	26	0.38%
1992	3,778	45.31%	3,275	39.27%	1,286	15.42%
1996	3,934	48.72%	3,407	42.19%	734	9.09%
2000	5,756	61.04%	3,593	38.10%	81	0.86%
2004	8,306	67.35%	3,979	32.26%	48	0.39%
2008	8,872	64.49%	4,811	34.97%	75	0.55%
2012	9,248	63.89%	5,057	34.94%	169	1.17%
2016	9,588	68.50%	4,094	29.25%	316	2.26%
2020	10,424	69.22%	4,511	29.95%	125	0.83%
2024	11,388	72.47%	4,295	27.33%	32	0.20%

United States Senate election results for Coffee County, Georgia2
Year	Republican		Democratic		Third party(ies)	
Year	No.	%	No.	%	No.	%
2020	10,424	69.54%	4,281	28.56%	286	1.91%
2020	9,154	69.29%	4,058	30.71%	0	0.00%

United States Senate election results for Coffee County, Georgia3
Year	Republican		Democratic		Third party(ies)	
Year	No.	%	No.	%	No.	%
2020	4,853	32.96%	2,455	16.68%	7,414	50.36%
2020	9,137	69.12%	4,082	30.88%	0	0.00%
2022	8,447	71.27%	3,216	27.13%	189	1.59%
2022	7,850	71.37%	3,149	28.63%	0	0.00%

Georgia Gubernatorial election results for Coffee County
Year	Republican		Democratic		Third party(ies)	
Year	No.	%	No.	%	No.	%
2022	8,818	74.07%	3,021	25.38%	66	0.55%

== See also ==
- Coffee Correctional Facility, a prison in Nicholls
- Coffee Regional Medical Center, Douglas
- Coffee Road
- General Coffee State Park
- National Register of Historic Places listings in Coffee County, Georgia
- Sapps Still, Georgia
- Broxton Rocks
- List of counties in Georgia
