= Irwinville, Georgia =

- Unincorporated community
- Location within Georgia Location within the United States
- Coordinates: 31°38′54″N 83°22′58″W
- Country: United States
- State: Georgia
- County: Irwin
- Named for: Jared Irwin
- Time zone: UTC-5 (Eastern (EST))
  - Summer (DST): UTC-4 (EDT)
- ZIP code: 31783
- Area code: 229

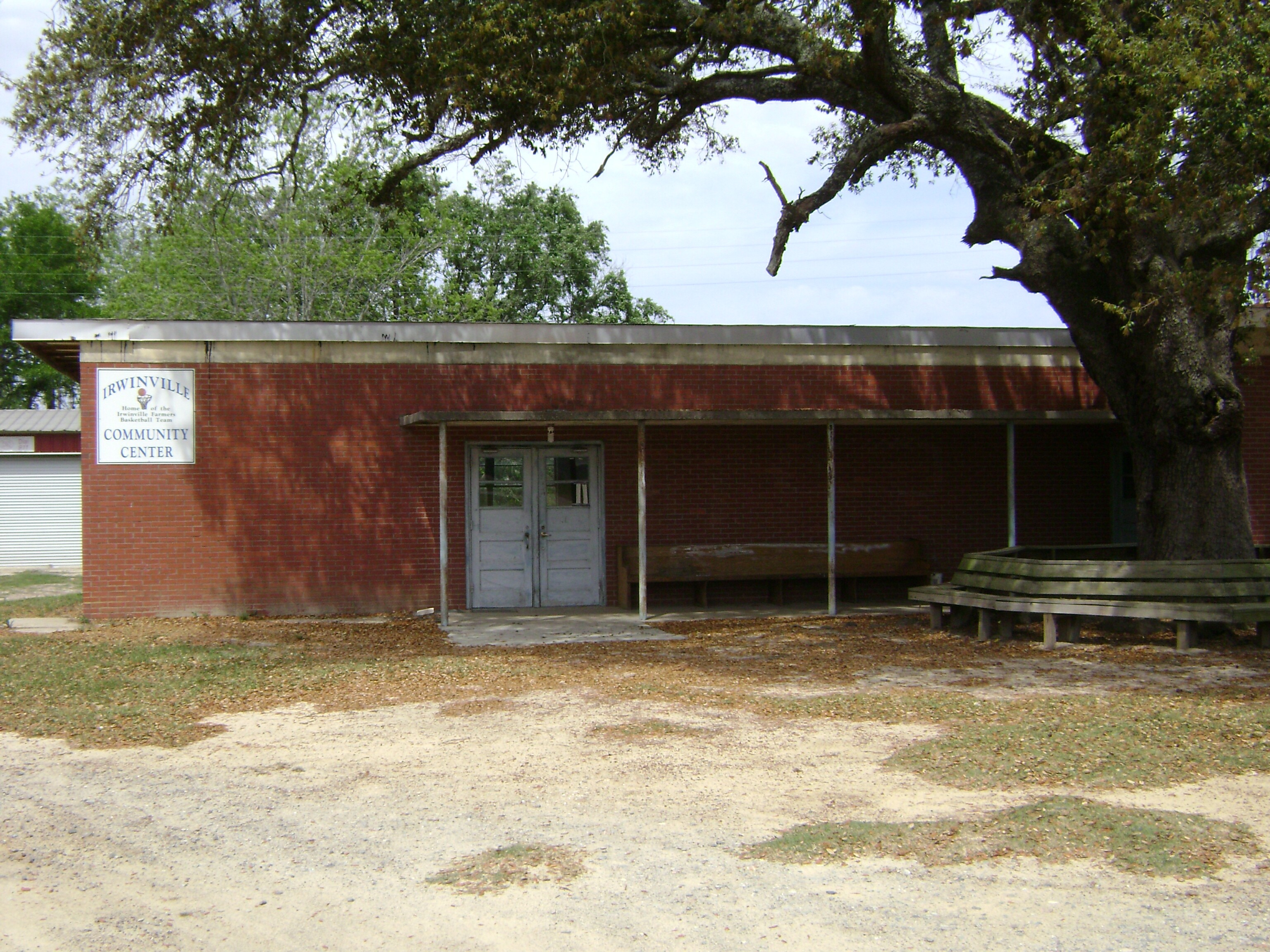
Irwinville Community Center

Irwinville is an unincorporated community in Irwin County, Georgia, United States.

Irwinville was founded as "Irwinsville" in 1831 as the seat for the newly formed Irwin County. The community was named for Georgia governor Jared Irwin. It was renamed to Irwinville (without the S) when it was incorporated as a town in 1857. In 1907, the seat of Irwin County was transferred from Irwinville to Ocilla.

Irwinville is well known for its role in the American Civil War as the site of the capture of Confederate President Jefferson Davis, who was fleeing Union troops. Today, the site of his capture is marked by a monument as well as a museum and park.

It was also a part of the WPA projects in the 1930s. A small water park originally called Crystal Lake (later changed to Crystal Beach) operated just outside there from the middle of the twentieth century to 1998.

== History ==
=== Unionist takeover ===
In mid-February 1865, a group of Southern Unionists, a large number of residents, and deserters led by local miller Willis Jackson Bone assembled in Irwinville. Bone operated a mill on Bone Pond (now Crystal Lake) near the Alapaha River. The group passed a resolution declaring the county's return to the Union. A lieutenant of the local militia protested the action, but was knocked down with a musket by Bone. Three cheers for Abraham Lincoln followed. The assembly then took after the lieutenant and the enrolling officer Gideon Brown. They and other Confederate sympathizers were chased out of town and threatened with death if they should return. Willis Jackson Bone was hanged near his pond in late April 1865 after he killed a local justice of the peace named Jack Walker while Bone was bringing food to an escaped slave named Toney. Walker had tried to take Toney into custody.

=== Capture of Jefferson Davis ===
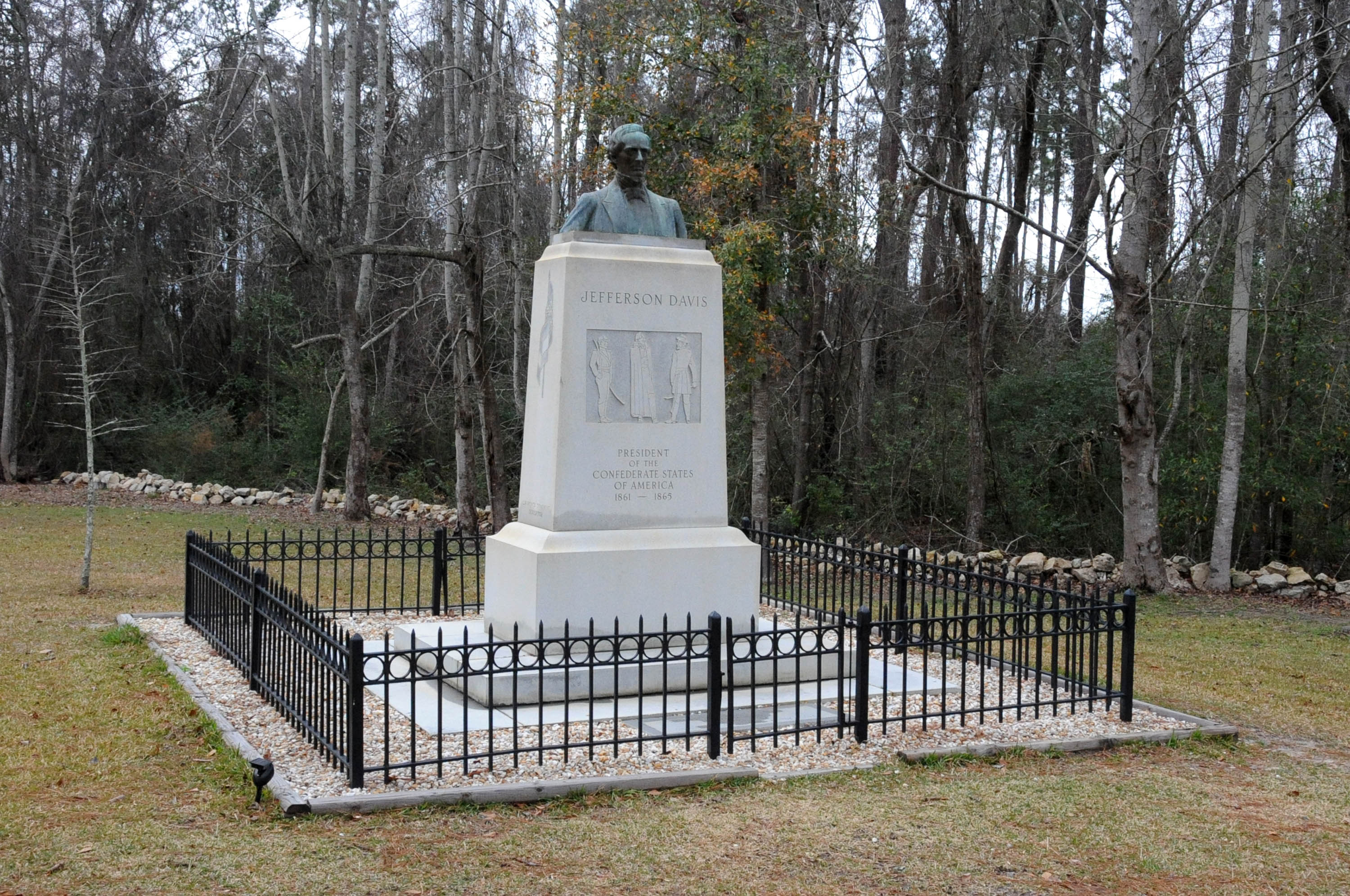
Jefferson Davis Capture Site, a property on the National Register of Historic Places listings in Irwin County, Georgia

A few months later, Irwinville became the site of the capture of Confederate President Jefferson Davis. Davis was on his way from the capital of the Confederacy at Richmond, Virginia to board a ship with his family and flee to safety in Cuba. Davis stopped at a hotel in Irwinville owned by Doctor G.E. White on the evening of May 9, 1865. There he conversed and socialized with the locals and no one had suspected that they were in the presence of a man of such notoriety. Davis and his family moved to an encampment beside a nearby creek bed only a couple of miles from the hotel after they were done talking with the citizens of Irwinville, and sometime in the early morning of May 10, the encampment was alarmed by the sound of gunfire. Davis tried to escape towards the creek wearing an overcoat and his wife had tied her scarf around his shoulders, due to a heavy rainstorm, but members of the First Wisconsin and Fourth Michigan Cavalry Regiments captured him. He was taken to Fortress Monroe, Virginia, and held for two years. J.B. Clements went on to claim in his book The History of Irwinville that had Davis revealed himself, the residents of Irwinville would have happily hidden him from the pursuing Union troops. Among those apprehended was Colonel William P. Johnston, the son of the late Albert Sidney Johnston, Confederate Postmaster General, John H. Reagan and Texas Confederate Governor, Francis R. Lubbock.

Today a monument marks the spot of Davis' arrest. The monument is located at the Jefferson Davis Memorial Historic Site. There is a museum, picnic facilities, and hiking trails. There are also frequent Civil War reenactments near the park.

== Ocilla & Irwinville Railroad ==
The Ocilla & Irwinville Railroad was incorporated on October 4, 1900 or earlier and operated 11 miles of track between Ocilla and Irwinville. The railroad owned one locomotive, one passenger carriage, and 46 freight carriages. The railroad was purchased in either February or March 1903 by the Brunswick & Birmingham Railroad which later leased it to the Fitzgerald, Ocilla, & Broxton Railroad in 1911. The 11 miles of track originally built by the Ocilla & Irwinville Railroad were abandoned in 1916 and later removed.

== As county seat ==
Irwinville served as the official county seat of Irwin County from the formation of the county in 1831 until August 17, 1907. A total of three courthouses were built in Irwinville over its 76-year tenure as county seat. The first courthouse was built by Benjamin Baker at a cost of about $1,500.00. Little is known about the first courthouse other than that it was a story and a half tall. It had a shingle roof, common with rural courthouses during this time.

In 1854, Loam Brown built a new courthouse at a cost of $1,323 to replace the courthouse built by Benjamin Baker. There is no known description available for this courthouse. In August 1883, a notice was placed on the door of the courthouse stating that it and the public square in which it sat would be sold to the highest available bidder within 10 days. John Clements won the courthouse at a sum of $40.50, to which there was significant public outcry because the citizens of Irwinville did not want to see the building go.

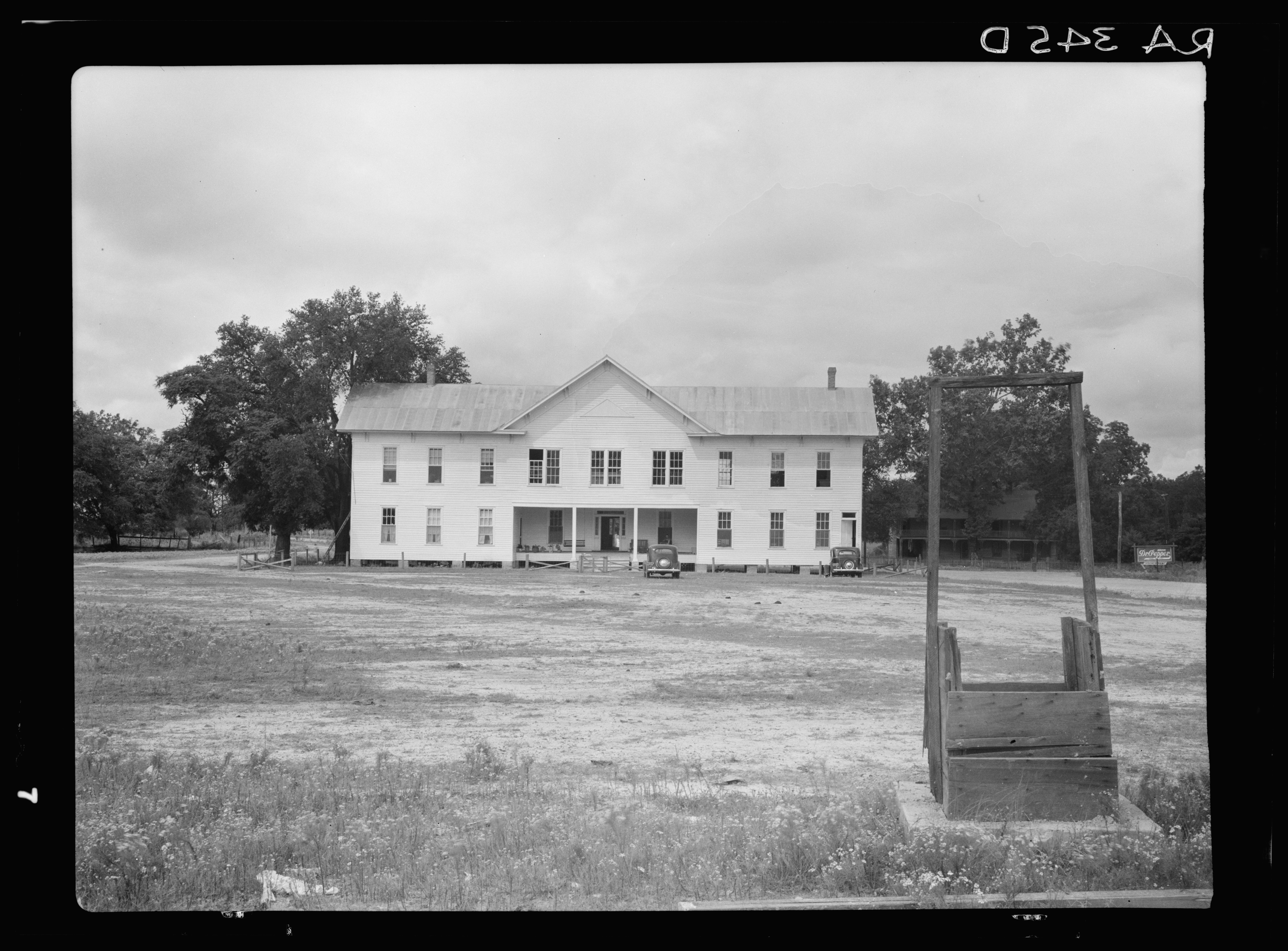
The last courthouse in Irwinville, 1935

During the summer of 1883, the third and final courthouse in Irwinville was commissioned at a cost of $4,080. This courthouse was of an elongated design and would have sat in about the same location as where Moorehead's County Store stands today. It was of plain white siding on the exterior with a tin roof.

In 1897, a petition to move the seat of Irwin County to Fitzgerald, was submitted but not approved. However, in 1905, Irwin County was divided into Irwin, Ben Hill, Turner, and Tift counties. The Spring of 1907 saw the county seat moved to its present location in Ocilla although the courthouse in Irwinville was still used for its original purpose until the new courthouse was completed in 1910.

== As a town ==
Irwinville was once the largest town in Irwin County and contained several stores, a bank, and a jail.

== Jails ==
Similarly to the courthouses, Irwinville had three jails throughout its history. The first jail was built between 1849 and 1850 at a cost of $800.00. The building was of log construction although nothing much is known past that. In 1856, an African-American prisoner named Josh Williams was imprisoned for the murder of two European-American men, Daniel and Bill Luke. On the night that Williams was arrested, someone set fire to the building and although the jailer lived only a mile away, neither the jail nor the prisoner could be saved. Josh Williams' remains are buried in a field cemetery behind the Masonic Lodge.

The jail was rebuilt in nearly the same way and reportedly had not been sealed well. In 1880, R.W. Clements had jailed another African-American man on the basis of a misdemeanor. According to witnesses, the inmate was said to have been "screaming and hollering as if all kinds of demons were after him." When Clements arrived at the jail, a rattlesnake had entered the cell that the prisoner was in. The prisoner was removed and the jail sealed so that nothing else could find its way in.

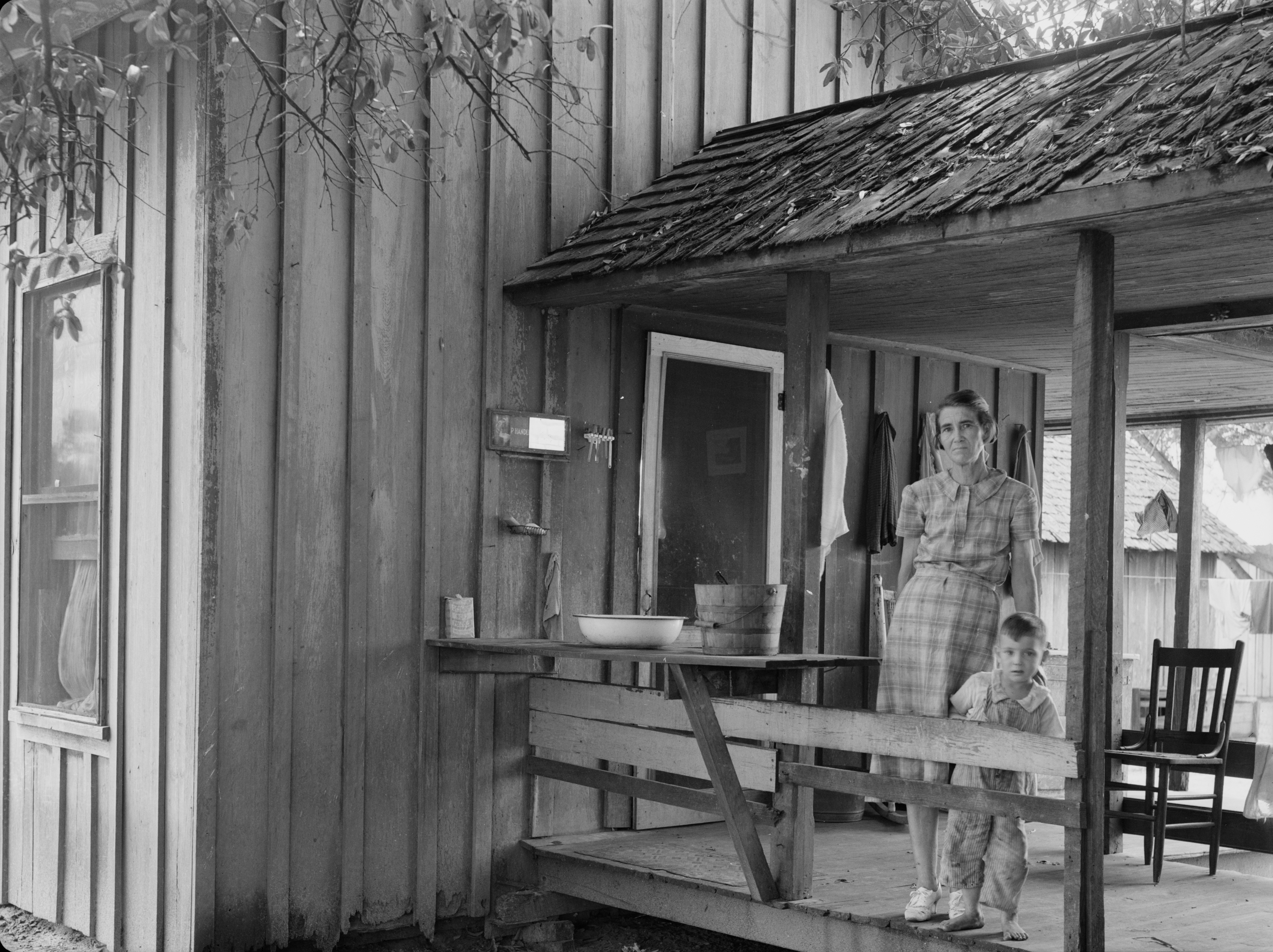
An Irwinville Farms Project family living in the second Irwinville jail during the 1930s.

In 1890, the county built another jail in Irwinville. It was of brick construction, contained eight steel cells, and cost $3,395.00 at the time of construction.

All three jails in Irwinville were built around the same area as the courthouses and where Moorehead's Country Store presently stands. We know from historical records that the Oak trees that stand around Moorehead's were once used for the hangings of criminals jailed at the jailhouses and convicted at the old courthouses.

== Hotel ==
The only surviving hotel building in Irwinville is the one built by Dr. G.E. White in the mid-1800s. Little is known about this building but it once welcomed visitors from many places and had played host to the American Confederacy's first and only president, Jefferson Davis.

== Bank ==
There have been several banks in Irwinville. The original bank operated until sometime near the 1920s or 1930s. The building still exists with the safe still inside, although a newer bank once operated in Irwinville until the 2000s.

== Health Department ==
The Irwinville Farms Project brought a Health Department to Irwinville during the Great Depression era. It was considered to be very useful for the people of Irwinville who visited it. The building, originally the bank, is still standing and is now used as a shop.

== Post office ==
Irwinville had its own post office up until 2012, although it had operated without a postmaster since 2010. The post office was closed by the United States Postal Service due to the cost of keeping it open.

== Irwinville Farms Project ==
Between 1935 and 1939, the Works Progress Administration began a program centered around Irwinville. The project came to be known as the Irwinville Farms Project and its main goal was to rejuvenate the area around Irwinville that had suffered greatly during The Great Depression. The Irwinville Farms Project resulted in the construction of a cooperative cotton gin (at the stoplight in Irwinville, directly across from Quick change #50 store), the monument in the park at the Jefferson Davis Memorial Historic Site, school playground, and a health clinic. The project brought sports and ultimately resulted in the famous Irwinville Farmers basketball team, a May Day-health festival, and it saw the old courthouse converted into apartments for farm families.
