= Julian M. Quarles =

American politician

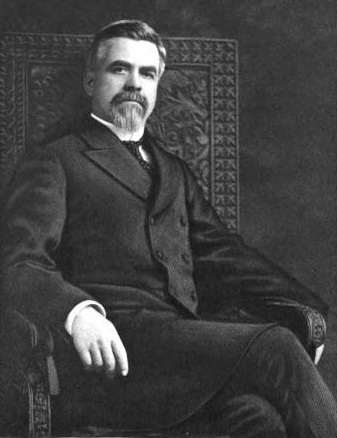

Member of the U.S. House of Representatives from Virginia's 10th district
- In office March 4, 1899 – March 3, 1901
- Preceded by: Jacob Yost
- Succeeded by: Henry D. Flood

Personal details
- Born: September 25, 1848 Ruther Glen, Virginia, U.S.
- Died: November 18, 1929 (aged 81) Staunton, Virginia, U.S.
- Resting place: Thornrose Cemetery
- Party: Democratic
- Spouse(s): Cornelia Stout, Cornelia Taylor
- Education: University of Virginia
- Occupation: Lawyer, judge

Julian Minor Quarles (September 25, 1848 – November 18, 1929) was a lawyer, judge and United States representative from Virginia to the 56th Congress.

== Biography ==
He was born near Ruther Glen, Virginia to Peter and Mary E. (née Waddy) Quarles. Peter Quarles had served as a soldier in the War of 1812.

Quarles received his early education from Pine Hill Academy and Aspen Hill Academy. He graduated from the University of Virginia. He taught school for several years before completing his degree in law at the University of Virginia in 1874. He practiced law in Staunton, Virginia, and served as county court judge for Augusta County, Virginia from 1880 to 1883. He also served on the board of directors of Mary Baldwin College.

Quarles was elected as a Democrat to the United States House of Representatives from Virginia in 1898 and served from March 4, 1899, to March 3, 1901. He was a delegate to the Virginia Constitutional Convention of 1901-1902, and voted to proclaim the constitution without referendum. He died in Staunton, Virginia.

In 1876 Quarles married Cornelia Stout. She died in 1903 and in 1908 Quarles married Cornelia Taylor. He and his second wife were the parents of two daughters and a son.

== Sources ==
Citations

Bibliography

- United States Congress. "Julian M. Quarles (id: Q000004)". Biographical Directory of the United States Congress.
- New River Notes bio of Quarles

U.S. House of Representatives
Preceded by Jacob Yost	Member of the U.S. House of Representatives from Virginia's 10th congressional district 1899–1901	Succeeded by Henry D. Flood
