= William Preston Johnston =

- William Preston Johnston, circa 1890

Assistant Private Secretary to the President of the Confederate States
- In office 1863 – May 1865
- President: Jefferson Davis
- Preceded by: Office established
- Succeeded by: Office abolished

Personal details
- Born: January 5, 1831 Louisville, Kentucky, U.S.
- Died: July 16, 1899 (aged 68) Lexington, Virginia, U.S.

Military service
- Branch/service: Confederate States Army
- Years of service: 1861–1865
- Rank: Colonel
- Battles/wars: American Civil War

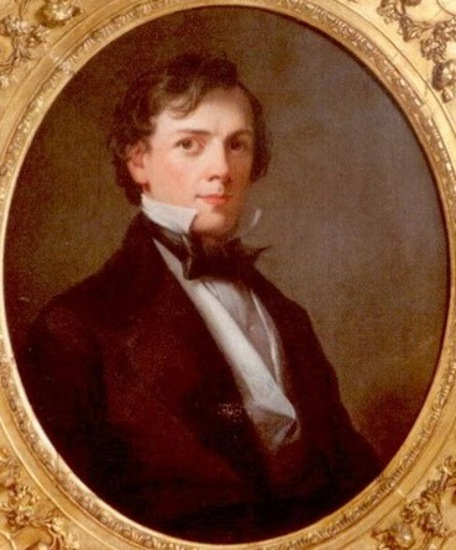
Lt. Col. William Preston Johnston, by Joseph Henry Bush

William Preston Johnston (January 5, 1831 – July 16, 1899) was a lawyer, scholar, poet, and Confederate soldier. He was the son and biographer of Confederate General Albert Sidney Johnston. He was a president of Louisiana State University and the first president of Tulane University from 1884 in the same year that the school was renamed from the University of Louisiana.

== Biography ==
Johnston was born in Louisville, Kentucky in 1831 to General Albert Sidney Johnston and Henrietta Preston Johnston. When he was four years old, his mother died; he was then reared by members of her family. Johnston attended several local schools, including the academy of Samuel Venable Womack in Shelbyville, Centre College in Danville, Western Military Institute in Georgetown, and Yale College. In March 1853, he received his law degree from the Louisville School of Law.

On July 6, 1853, he married his first wife, Rosa Elizabeth Duncan, the daughter of John N. Duncan of New Orleans.

During the American Civil War, Johnston served as an aide-de-camp to Jefferson Davis, president of the Confederate States. Johnston was a colonel in the Confederate Army. Johnston was captured with Jefferson Davis at Irwinville, Georgia, at the end of the war, and was imprisoned for several months at Fort Delaware.

After the war (at the invitation of Robert E. Lee), he became a professor at Washington College in Virginia. In 1880, he became president of Louisiana State University in Baton Rouge, but resigned four years later to become the first president of the new Tulane University in 1884.

Johnston wrote two books of poetry, My Garden Walk (1894) and Pictures of the Patriarchs and Other Poems (1895). He also wrote The Prototype of Hamlet and Other Shakespearean Problems (1890) as well as a biography of his father, The Life of General Albert Sidney Johnston (1878), a "most valuable and exhaustive biography".

Johnston was elected a member of the American Antiquarian Society in 1893.

His first wife died on October 19, 1885, and he married Margaret Henshaw Avery of Avery Island, Louisiana, in April 1888. At the age of 67 on July 16, 1899, he died at the home of his son-in-law, Congressman Henry St. George Tucker in Lexington, Virginia.
