= New Appomattox Court House =

Courthouse in Appomattox, Virginia, U.S.

Appomattox Courthouse
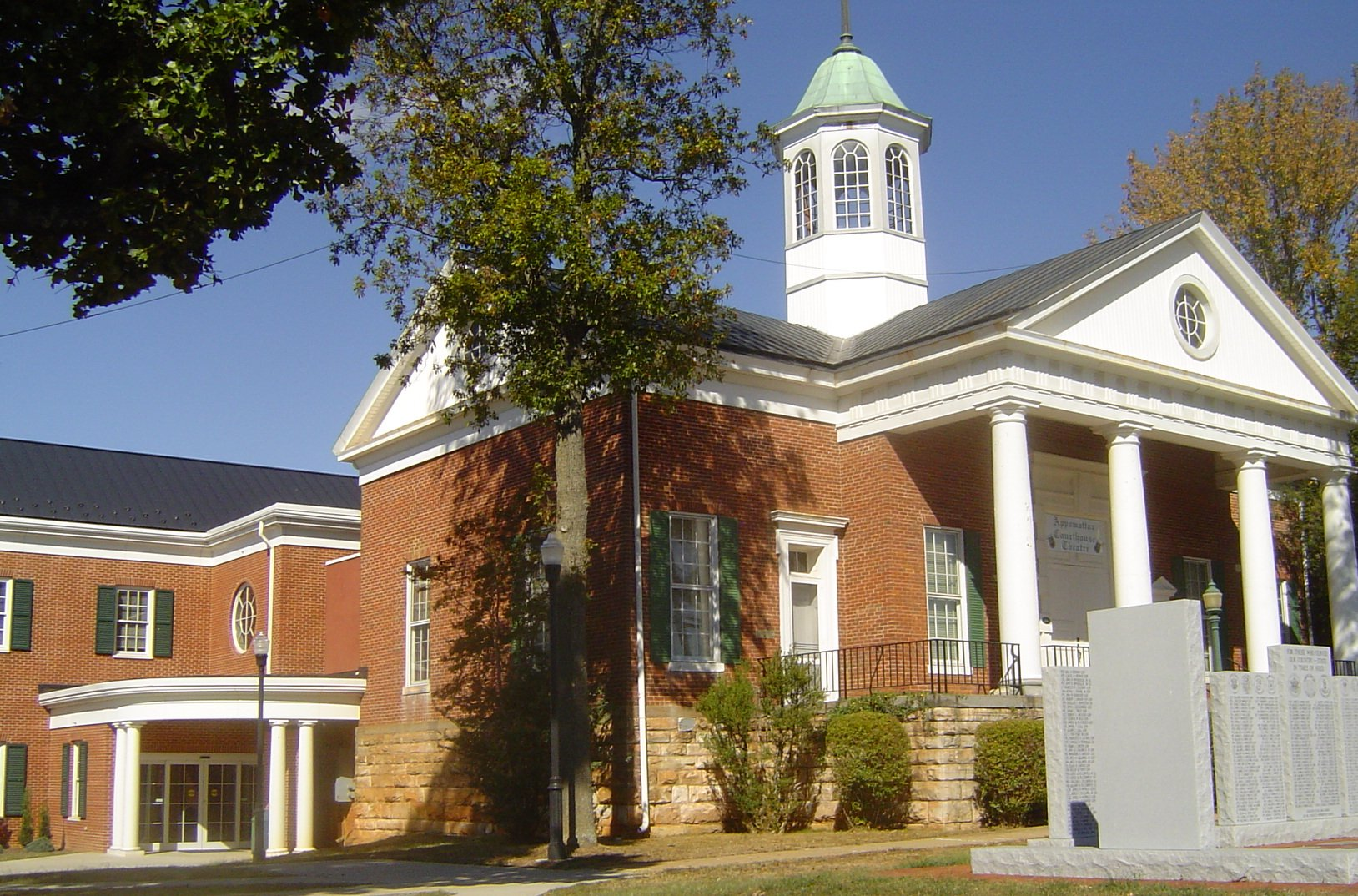
- Current "new" Appomattox Courthouse that was built in 1892
- Interactive map of the Appomattox Courthouse area

General information
- Location: Appomattox, Virginia
- Coordinates: 37°21′20″N 78°49′47″W
- Construction started: 1892
- Completed: 1892

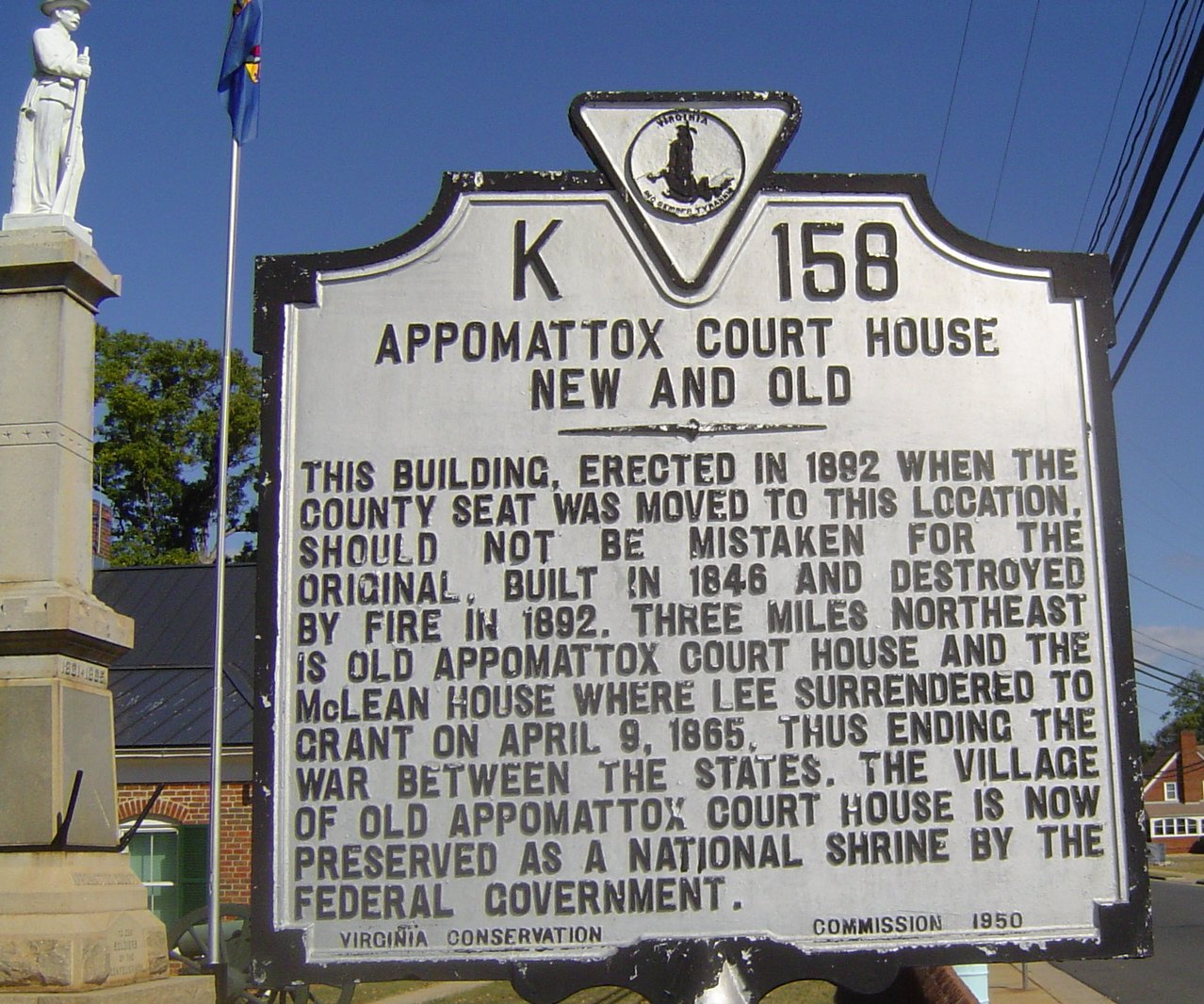
Appomattox Court House historic marker

The Appomattox Courthouse is the current courthouse in Appomattox, Virginia built in 1892. It is located in the middle of the state about three miles (5 km) southwest of the Appomattox Court House National Historical Park, once known as Clover Hill—home of the original Old Appomattox Court House. The "new" Appomattox Courthouse is near the Appomattox Station and where the regional county government is located.

Before the Civil War, the railroad bypassed Clover Hill, now known as the Appomattox Court House National Historical Park. As a result the population of Clover Hill, where the Old Appomattox Courthouse once stood, never grew much over 150 while Appomattox town grew to the thousands. When the courthouse at the village of Clover Hill burned for the second time in 1892, it was not rebuilt and a new courthouse was built in West Appomattox. That sealed the fate of the village of Clover Hill. The county seat was formally moved to the town of West Appomattox in 1894 and the word "West" was dropped in time making the name of the town just Appomattox, Virginia.

There is a marker at the site of the "new" Appomattox Court House explaining the difference between the "new" and "old" court houses.

This building, erected in 1892 when the county seat was moved to this location, should not be mistaken for the original, built in 1846 and destroyed by fire in 1892. Three miles northeast is old Appomattox Court House and the McLean House where Lee surrendered to Grant on April 9, 1865, thus ending the War between the States. The village of Old Appomattox Court House is now preserved as a national shrine by the Federal Government.

Two members of the United States House of Representatives, Henry D. Flood and his half-brother Joel West Flood, are entombed in a mausoleum on the courthouse green.
