= Joel West Flood =

American politician (1894–1964)

Member of the U.S. House of Representatives from Virginia's 10th district
- In office November 8, 1932 – March 3, 1933
- Preceded by: Henry S. Tucker III
- Succeeded by: n/a

Commonwealth's Attorney for Appomattox County
- In office August 15, 1919 – November 8, 1932
- Preceded by: S. L. Ferguson
- Succeeded by: Watkins Abbitt

Personal details
- Born: Joel West Flood; August 2, 1894 Appomattox County, Virginia, U.S.
- Died: April 27, 1964 (aged 69) Richmond, Virginia, U.S.
- Resting place: Flood Mausoleum, Appomattox Courthouse Square
- Party: Democratic
- Spouse: Dorothy
- Education: Washington & Lee University; University of Virginia; Oxford University
- Occupation: Lawyer; judge; politician

Joel West Flood (August 2, 1894 – April 27, 1964), the brother of Henry De La Warr Flood and uncle of Harry Flood Byrd, was a Virginia lawyer and judge and briefly United States Representative from Virginia from November 1932 to March 1933.

== Early and family life ==
He was born near Appomattox, Appomattox County, Virginia on August 2, 1894, to former Confederate States Army major and Virginia General Assembly member Joel Walker Flood (1839-1916) and his second (or third) wife, Sallie Whiteman Delk, whom he had married in Philadelphia in 1892. Joel Flood had an elder half siblings Eleanor Bolling Flood Byrd (1864-1957)) and Henry De La Warr Flood (1866 -1921). He attended public schools in Appomattox and Richmond, Virginia, before receiving an undergraduate degree from Washington and Lee University. He also attended the University of Virginia School of Law (receiving a law degree) and Oxford University.

== Career ==
After his father's death and his own admission to the Virginia bar in 1917, Flood began a legal practice in Appomattox, Virginia.

=== World War I ===
He also took over what remained of the family plantation. During World War I, Flood served from March 29, 1918, until his discharge July 18, 1919, as a private in Company A, Three Hundred and Fifth Engineers, Eightieth Division.

=== Early political career ===
Appomattox County voters elected Flood Commonwealth attorney in 1919, a position once held by his elder half-brother Henry D. Flood. He was re-elected multiple times and served until November 8, 1932. Also, upon returning to Virginia, Flood became a member of the unofficial Byrd Organization created by his nephew Harry F. Byrd upon the demise of Sen. Thomas Staples Martin. Joel Flood also served as an assistant to Governor E. Lee Trinkle of Virginia from 1922 to 1926, and as special assistant to the Attorney General of Virginia from April 1, 1928, to July 1, 1932.

=== Congress ===
Elected to Congress as a Democrat to fill the vacancy caused by the death of Henry St. George Tucker, he served from November 8, 1932, to March 3, 1933 (in the Seventy-second Congress). The seat was eliminated due to restructuring after the 1930 census. Flood was not a candidate for election to the Seventy-third Congress, but returned to his legal practice and agricultural pursuits. He also served as a delegate to the Democratic National Convention in 1936. He was appointed assistant United States attorney for the Western District of Virginia and served from June 1, 1939, to January 28, 1940. Virginia legislators elected him as a judge of the fifth judicial circuit of Virginia in January 1940, in which capacity he served until his death.

== Death and legacy ==
Joel Flood died in the Richmond Veterans Administration hospital Chesterfield, Virginia on April 27, 1964. He is interred in the Flood Mausoleum, Appomattox Courthouse Square.

U.S. House of Representatives
Preceded by Henry St. George Tucker III	Member of the U.S. House of Representatives from Virginia's 10th congressional district 1932–1933	District eliminated
