= Henry D. Flood =

American politician (1865–1921)

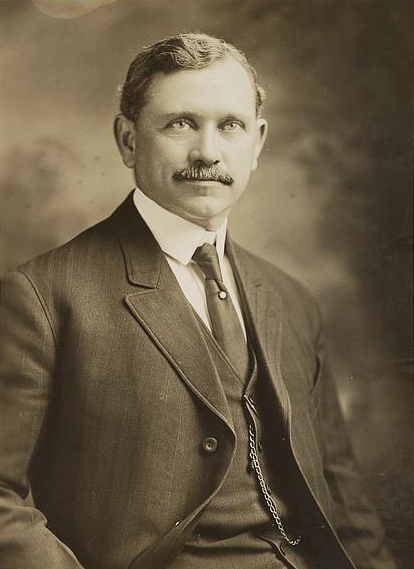

Member of the U.S. House of Representatives from Virginia's 10th district
- In office March 4, 1901 – December 8, 1921
- Preceded by: Julian M. Quarles
- Succeeded by: Henry S. Tucker III

Member of the Virginia Senate from the 18th district
- In office December 2, 1891 – March 4, 1901
- Preceded by: Edmund W. Hubard
- Succeeded by: Frank C. Moon

Member of the Virginia House of Delegates from Appomattox County
- In office December 8, 1887 – December 2, 1891
- Preceded by: W. C. Franklin
- Succeeded by: J. W. Harwood

Personal details
- Born: Henry De La Warr Flood; September 2, 1865 Eldon Appomattox County, Virginia, Virginia, U.S.
- Died: December 8, 1921 (aged 56) Washington, D.C., U.S.
- Party: Democratic
- Education: Washington & Lee University; University of Virginia
- Occupation: Attorney

Henry De La Warr Flood (September 2, 1865 – December 8, 1921) was a representative from the Commonwealth of Virginia to the United States House of Representatives, brother of U.S. Representative Joel West Flood and uncle of U.S. Senator Harry Flood Byrd.

== Early and family life ==
Flood was born September 2, 1865, in "Eldon" in Appomattox County, Virginia, to former Virginia state senator and CSA Major Joel Walker Flood (1839–1916), and his first wife, the former Ella Faulkner (1844–1885). He had an elder sister, Eleanor Bolling Flood Byrd (1864–1957), and a younger half-brother Joel West Flood (1894–1964). Flood attended public schools in Appomattox and Richmond, Virginia. He received his undergraduate degree from Washington and Lee University and his law degree from the University of Virginia.

On April 18, 1914, the middle-aged bachelor married Anna Florence Portner (1888–1966), daughter of German beer brewer and inventor Robert Portner. They married at All Souls Unitarian Church in Washington, D.C., followed by a reception at the Pan American Union Building. His young namesake Henry D. Flood III died in 1920, the year of his birth, as had their daughter Anna Portner Flood in 1916. Their children Bolling Byrd Flood (1915–2000) and Eleanor Faulkner Flood Schoellkopf (1917–1975) survived their parents.

== Career ==
Flood was admitted to the bar in 1886 and commenced practice in Appomattox, Virginia. He was elected Commonwealth's Attorney for Appomattox County in 1891, 1895, and 1899.

Voters also elected Flood as Appomattox County's delegate to the Virginia House of Delegates from 1887 to 1891 (a part-time position). He served as member of the Senate of Virginia from 1891 to 1903. He was a delegate to the Virginia Constitutional Convention of 1901. He was an unsuccessful candidate for election to the Fifty-fifth Congress.

Flood was elected as a Democrat to the Fifty-seventh and to the ten succeeding Congresses and served until his death (March 4, 1901 – December 8, 1921). In his first term, he proposed creation of what ultimately became Shenandoah National Park more than a decade after his death, due to the efforts of his nephew Harry F. Byrd, who became one of Virginia's U.S. Senators in 1933.

Flood served as chair of the Committee on Foreign Affairs (Sixty-second through Sixty-fifth Congresses), Committee on Territories (Sixty-second Congress).

In 1911, he was responsible for the Flood amendment to the enabling act for New Mexico statehood, which provided for a simple majority to ratify amendments to the New Mexico Constitution. In 1917, he helped to bring the United States into World War I as the author of the resolutions declaring a state of war to exist between the United States and Germany and Austria-Hungary.

== Death and legacy ==
Henry died on December 8, 1921, in Washington, D.C.

He was interred in a mausoleum on the courthouse green at Appomattox, Virginia; the courthouse is located in the Appomattox Historic District.

== See also ==
- List of members of the United States Congress who died in office (1900–1949)

U.S. House of Representatives
Preceded by Julian M. Quarles	Member of the U.S. House of Representatives from Virginia's 10th congressional district 1901–1921	Succeeded by Henry S. Tucker III
