= National Register of Historic Places listings in Irwin County, Georgia =

Irwin County, Georgia, has three properties listed on the National Register of Historic Places (NRHP).

This National Park Service list is complete through NPS recent listings posted September 11, 2026.

== Current listings ==
	Name on the Register	Image	Date listed	Location	City or town	Description
1	Jefferson Davis Capture Site	Jefferson Davis Capture Site	April 1, 1980 (#80001094)	N of Irwinville; 31°39′52″N 83°23′12″W	Irwinville	Now a Georgia state historic site
2	Irwin County Courthouse	Irwin County Courthouse	September 18, 1980 (#80001095)	2nd St. 31°35′30″N 83°15′04″W	Ocilla	
3	Ocilla Public School	Ocilla Public School	October 27, 2004 (#04001186)	4th and Alder Sts. 31°35′41″N 83°15′13″W	Ocilla	
