= Henry St. George Tucker III =

American lawyer and politician (1853–1932)

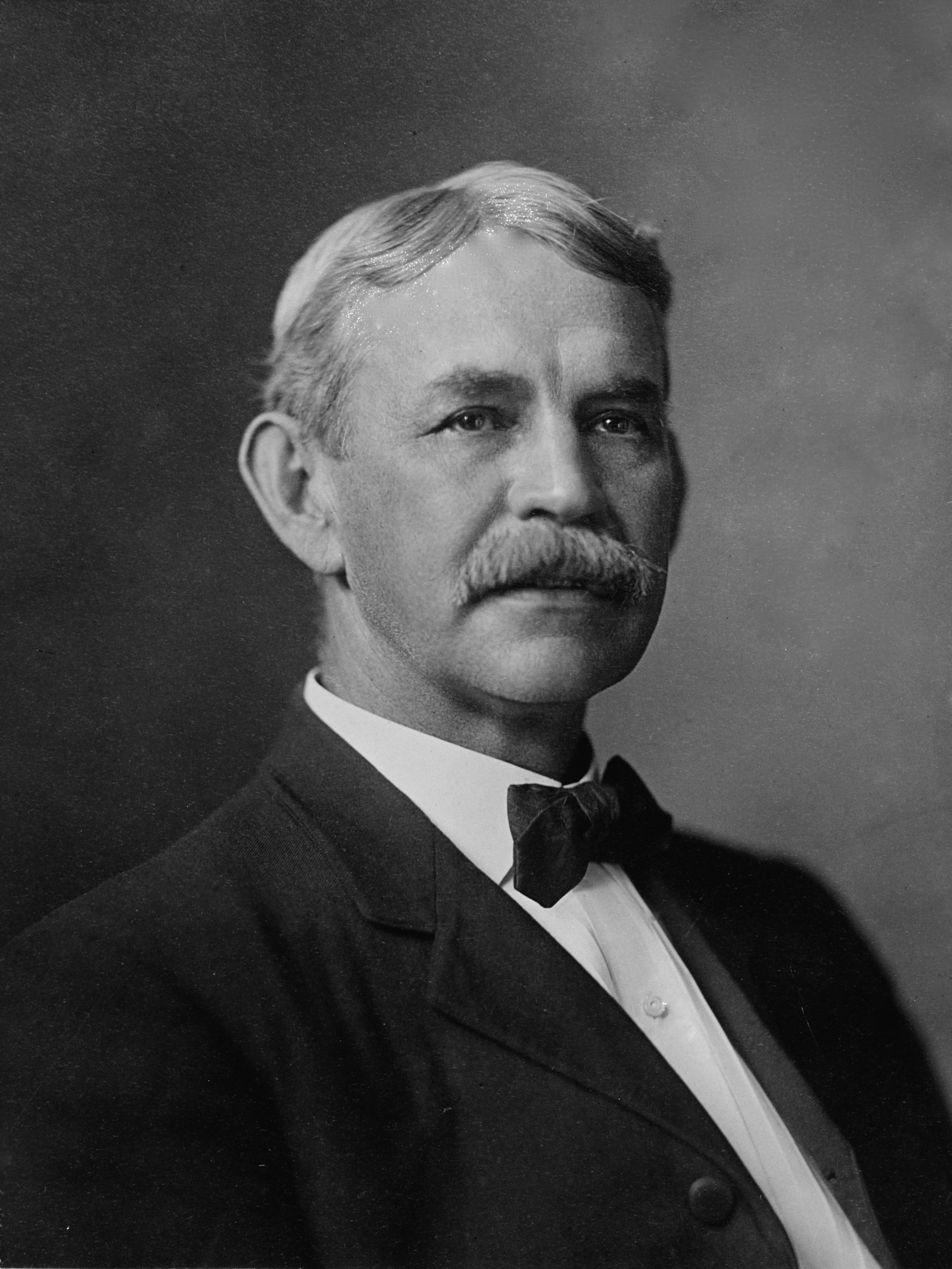
- Tucker in 1923

Member of the U.S. House of Representatives from Virginia's 10th district
- In office March 21, 1922 – July 23, 1932
- Preceded by: Henry D. Flood
- Succeeded by: Joel W. Flood
- In office March 4, 1889 – March 3, 1897
- Preceded by: Jacob Yost
- Succeeded by: Jacob Yost

Personal details
- Born: Henry St. George Tucker III; April 5, 1853 Winchester, Virginia, U.S.
- Died: July 23, 1932 (aged 79) Lexington, Virginia, U.S.
- Resting place: Oak Grove Cemetery
- Party: Democratic
- Spouses: Henrietta Preston Johnston (m. 1877; died 1900); Martha Sharpe (m. 1903; died 1928); Mary Jane Williams (m. 1929)
- Children: 7, including J. Randolph
- Parent: J. Randolph Tucker (father)
- Education: Washington and Lee University (AM, LLB)
- Occupation: Lawyer; politician; professor

Henry St. George Tucker III (April 5, 1853 – July 23, 1932) was a representative from the Commonwealth of Virginia to the United States House of Representatives, professor of law, and president of the American Bar Association.

== Early and family life ==
Tucker was born in Winchester, Virginia to lawyer John Randolph Tucker (1823–1897) and his wife, Laura (née Powell; 1827–1916). He received an LL.B. degree from Washington and Lee University School of Law in 1876. He married Henrietta Preston Johnston, a daughter of William Preston Johnston, on October 25, 1877, and had several children, among them John Randolph Tucker (b. 1879). In 1898, he purchased the Col Alto estate at Lexington, Virginia.

== Career ==
Tucker was elected to the 51st Congress as a Democrat and served four terms. He thereupon returned to Washington and Lee, where he became the professor of constitutional law and equity in 1897. Three years later he was made Dean of the Law School, in 1900.

He moved to Washington, D.C., and became dean of the school of law at Columbian University (now George Washington University) from 1903 to 1905, when he became President of the Jamestown Exposition and of the American Bar Association.

Tucker unsuccessfully sought the Democratic nomination for governor in 1909 and 1921. He returned to Congress in 1922, after a hiatus of nearly 25 years, when he was elected to the 67th Congress upon the death of Henry D. Flood in 1921. He was re-elected several times, serving until his own death in 1932.

== Works ==
- Tucker, Henry St. George III (2003). Woman's suffrage by constitutional amendment. Clark, N.J. : Lawbook Exchange, 2003; Originally published: New Haven : Yale University Press, 1916, in series: Storrs lectures. ISBN 1-58477-342-1.
- Tucker, Henry St. George III (2000). Limitations on the treaty-making power under the Constitution of the United States. Union, N.J. : Lawbook Exchange, 2000; Originally published: Boston : Little, Brown, 1915. ISBN 1-58477-015-5.
- Tucker, John Randolph (1981). The Constitution of the United States : a critical discussion of its genesis, development, and interpretation; edited by Henry St. George Tucker. Littleton, Colo. : F.B. Rothman, 1981; Reprint. Originally published: Chicago : Callaghan, 1899. ISBN 0-8377-1206-8.

== See also ==
- List of members of the United States Congress who died in office (1900–1949)

U.S. House of Representatives
Preceded by Jacob Yost	Member of the U.S. House of Representatives from Virginia's 10th congressional district 1889–1897	Succeeded by Jacob Yost
Preceded by Henry D. Flood	Member of the U.S. House of Representatives from Virginia's 10th congressional district 1922–1932	Succeeded by Joel W. Flood
Academic offices
Preceded by William Lyne Wilson	President of Washington and Lee University; 1900—1901	Succeeded by George H. Denny
