= Ocilla Public School =

- U.S. National Register of Historic Places
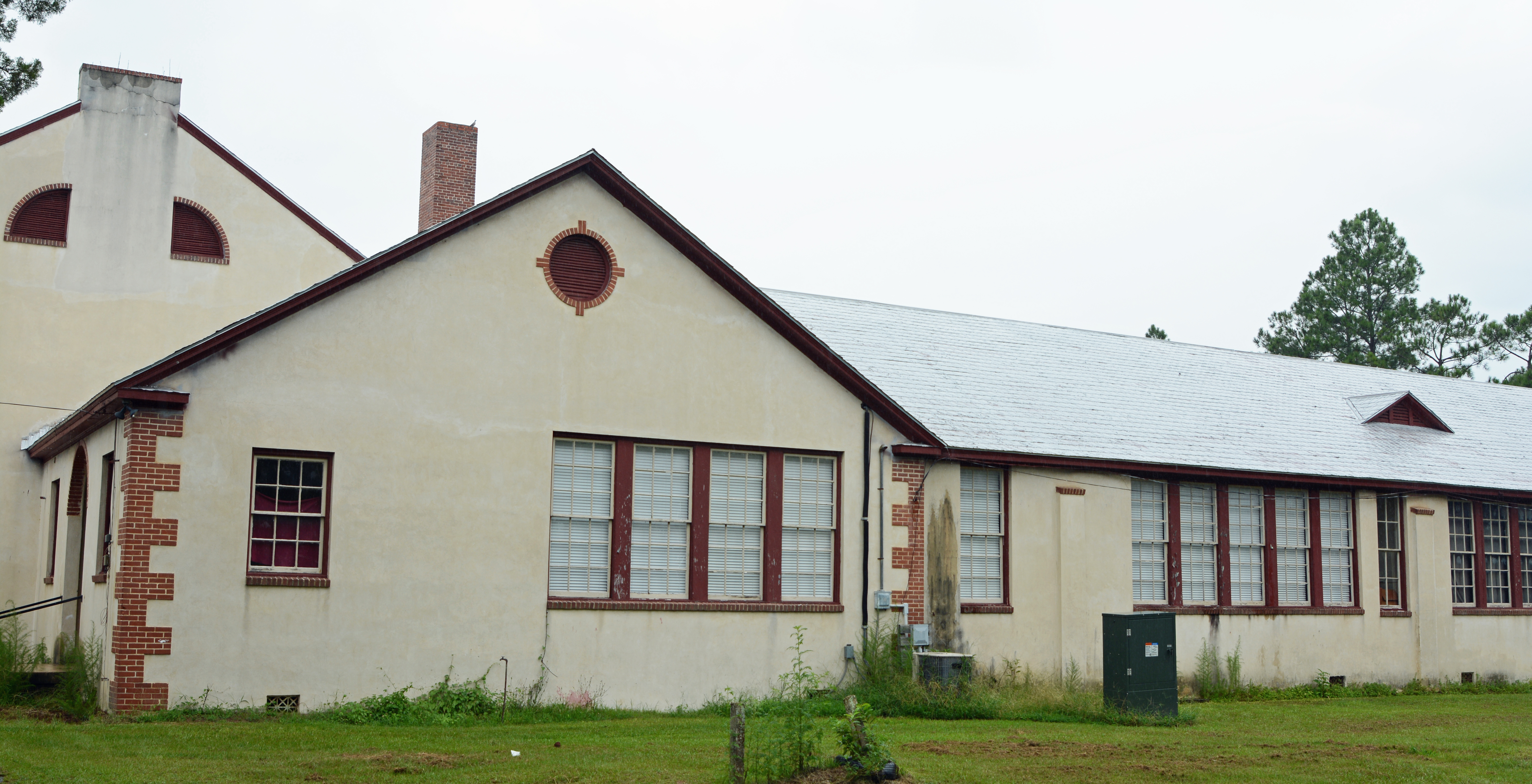

- Location within Georgia Location within the United States
- Location: 4th and Alder Sts., Ocilla, Georgia
- Coordinates: 31°35′40″N 83°15′14″W
- Area: 3.5 acres (1.4 ha)
- Built: 1934
- Architect: Parrott, Lauren
- Architectural style: Colonial Revival, International Style
- NRHP reference No.: 04001186
- Added to NRHP: October 27, 2004

The Ocilla Public School, also known as Irwin County Elementary School, is a historic school building in Ocilla, Georgia, United States, that is listed on the National Register of Historic Places.

== Description ==
The main building is a one-story U-shaped building with 17 classrooms, a library, a 700-seat auditorium, and more. It has Colonial Revival details. It was built in 1934 to serve as both elementary school and high school. In the early 1950s, it became known as the Irwin County Elementary School when a separate high school was built about three blocks away.

A one-story brick cafeteria and classroom building was added in c.1960, and has International Style design.

== See also ==
- National Register of Historic Places listings in Irwin County, Georgia
