= Jacob Yost (Virginia politician) =

American politician

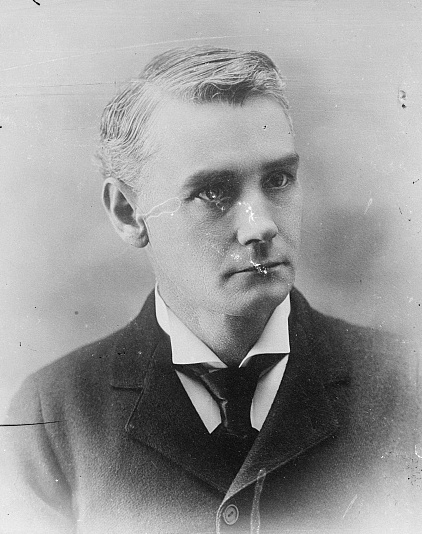

Member of the U.S. House of Representatives from Virginia's 10th district
- In office March 4, 1887 – March 3, 1889
- Preceded by: John R. Tucker
- Succeeded by: Henry S. Tucker III
- In office March 4, 1897 – March 3, 1899
- Preceded by: Henry S. Tucker III
- Succeeded by: Julian M. Quarles

Mayor of Staunton, Virginia
- In office May 1886 – January 1, 1887

Personal details
- Born: April 1, 1853 Staunton, Virginia, US
- Died: January 25, 1933 (aged 79) Palo Alto, California, US
- Resting place: Staunton, Virginia, US
- Party: Republican
- Occupation: printer, civil engineer

Military service
- Allegiance: United States of America

Jacob Yost (April 1, 1853 – January 25, 1933) was an American politician who served as mayor of Staunton, as well as twice represented Virginia's Shenandoah Valley in the United States House of Representatives, from 1887 to 1889 and 1897–1899.

== Early and family life ==
Yost was born in Staunton, Virginia in 1853 to Major Samuel McPherson Yost and his wife Henrietta Cushing Yost. His father became Indian Agent for New Mexico in 1857, and Quartermaster Major in the Confederate States Army (C.S.A.) during the American Civil War. Branches of the Yost family were active in Shenandoah and Rockingham Counties. A cousin was C.S.A. General John R. Jones (son of Samuel's sister Harriet Yost). Samuel's cousins (with the same grandmother, Catharine Miller) included Major Hunter Liggett of the 31st U.S.V. in the Philippine Islands and C.S.A. Lt. Jacob N. Liggett of Harrisonburg, Virginia.

Having lost his mother as an infant, young Jacob Yost was raised by his grandmother Kate D. Yost, aunt Mary and cousin Samuel W.P. Yost. He attended the public schools and Jedediah Hotchkiss's Mossy Creek Academy in Augusta County, where he learned about cartography and mining. After the American Civil War, his father Samuel M. Yost lived with his family (including his second wife, Catherine) in Linville, Rockingham County, Virginia.

Jacob Yost married Mary S. Young Yost on January 13, 1881. They had a daughter Mary born in 1882 and who became a teacher in Staunton but still lived with her parents in the 1910 census, and a son Merrill C. Yost (b. 1900) who survived to adulthood.

== Career ==
Yost learned the printing trade from his father and in 1875 purchased the Valley Virginian. The family enterprise also published various books. He also engaged in civil engineering involving iron and coal (traditional industries in Rockingham County).

Although his father Samuel participated in the National Republican Convention of 1880 and served as Staunton's postmaster under Presidents Grant, Hays, Arthur, Harrison and McKinley, Jacob Yost was an unsuccessful Republican candidate for election in 1884 to the Forty-ninth Congress.

Staunton's voters elected him mayor in May 1886 and he served until January 1887, when he resigned, having been elected to Congress. He was elected as a Republican to the Fiftieth Congress (March 4, 1887 – March 3, 1889) but was an unsuccessful candidate for reelection in 1888 to the Fifty-first Congress. Years later, he was elected to the Fifty-fifth Congress (March 4, 1897 – March 3, 1899) but he declined to be a candidate for renomination in 1898.

== Later life and death ==
After leaving Congress, Yost engaged in the management and development of iron ore and coal lands. He moved to Palo Alto, California in 1925 and lived there in retirement until his death on January 25, 1933. His body was returned to Staunton for burial in historic Thornrose Cemetery.

== See also ==
- List of mayors of Staunton, Virginia

U.S. House of Representatives
Preceded by John R. Tucker	Member of the U.S. House of Representatives from Virginia's 10th congressional district 1887–1889	Succeeded by Henry S. Tucker III
Preceded by Henry S. Tucker III	Member of the U.S. House of Representatives from Virginia's 10th congressional district 1897–1899	Succeeded by Julian M. Quarles
