= Jefferson Davis Memorial Historic Site =

Jefferson Davis Memorial Historic Site Jefferson Davis Capture Site
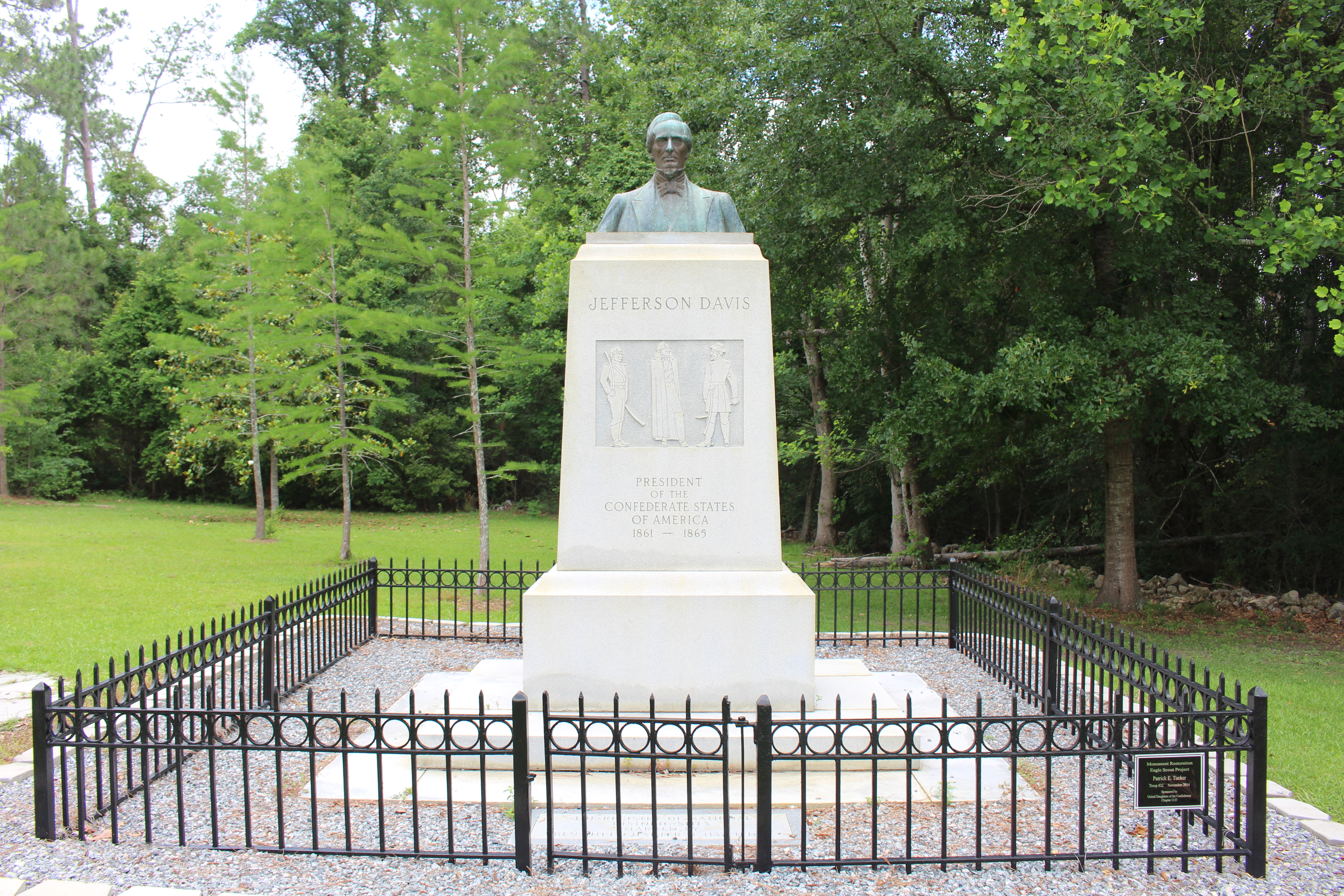
- Monument in 2017

- Location within Georgia Location within the United States
- 31.66455°N 83.38668°W
- Location: Irwin County, Georgia
- Nearest city: Fitzgerald, Georgia

History
- Founded: July 26, 1920
- Founder: James B. Clements

Site notes
- Area: 12.668 acres (5.127 ha)
- Governing body: Irwin County (Georgia) Board of Commissioners
- Visitors: 2,873 (in 2015)
- Website: Jefferson Davis Memorial Historic Site

U.S. National Register of Historic Places
- Official name: Jefferson Davis Capture Site
- Designated: April 1, 1980
- Reference no.: 80001094

Jefferson Davis Memorial Historic Site (also known as the Jefferson Davis Capture Site) is a 12.668-acre (5.127 ha) state historic site located in Irwin County, Georgia that marks the spot where Confederate States President Jefferson Davis was captured by United States Cavalry on Wednesday, May 10, 1865. The historic site features a granite monument with a bronze bust of Davis that is located at the place of capture. The memorial museum, built in 1939 by the Works Progress Administration, features Civil War era weapons, uniforms, artifacts and an exhibit about the president's 1865 flight from Richmond, Virginia to Irwin County, Georgia.

== History ==
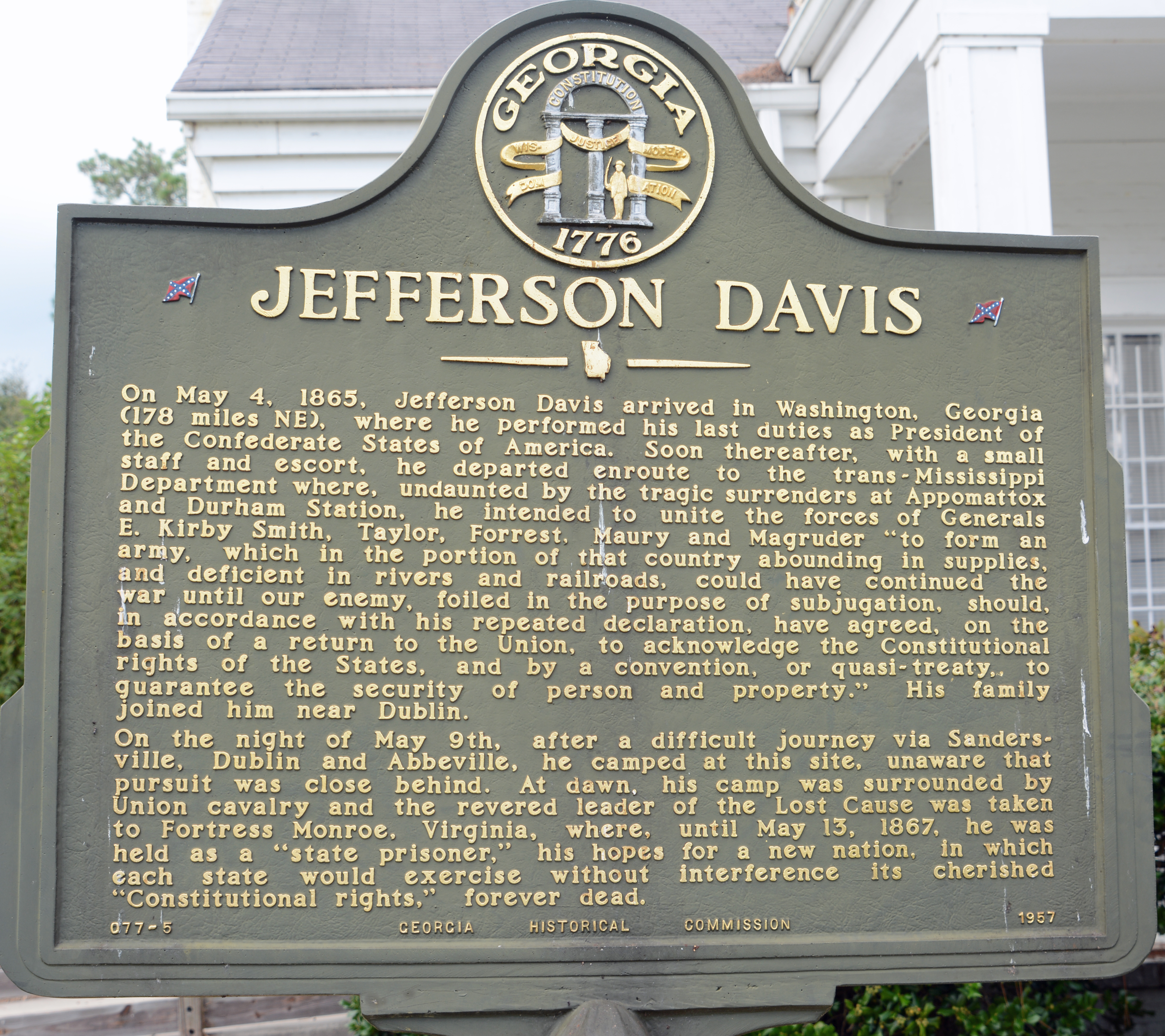
Left marker

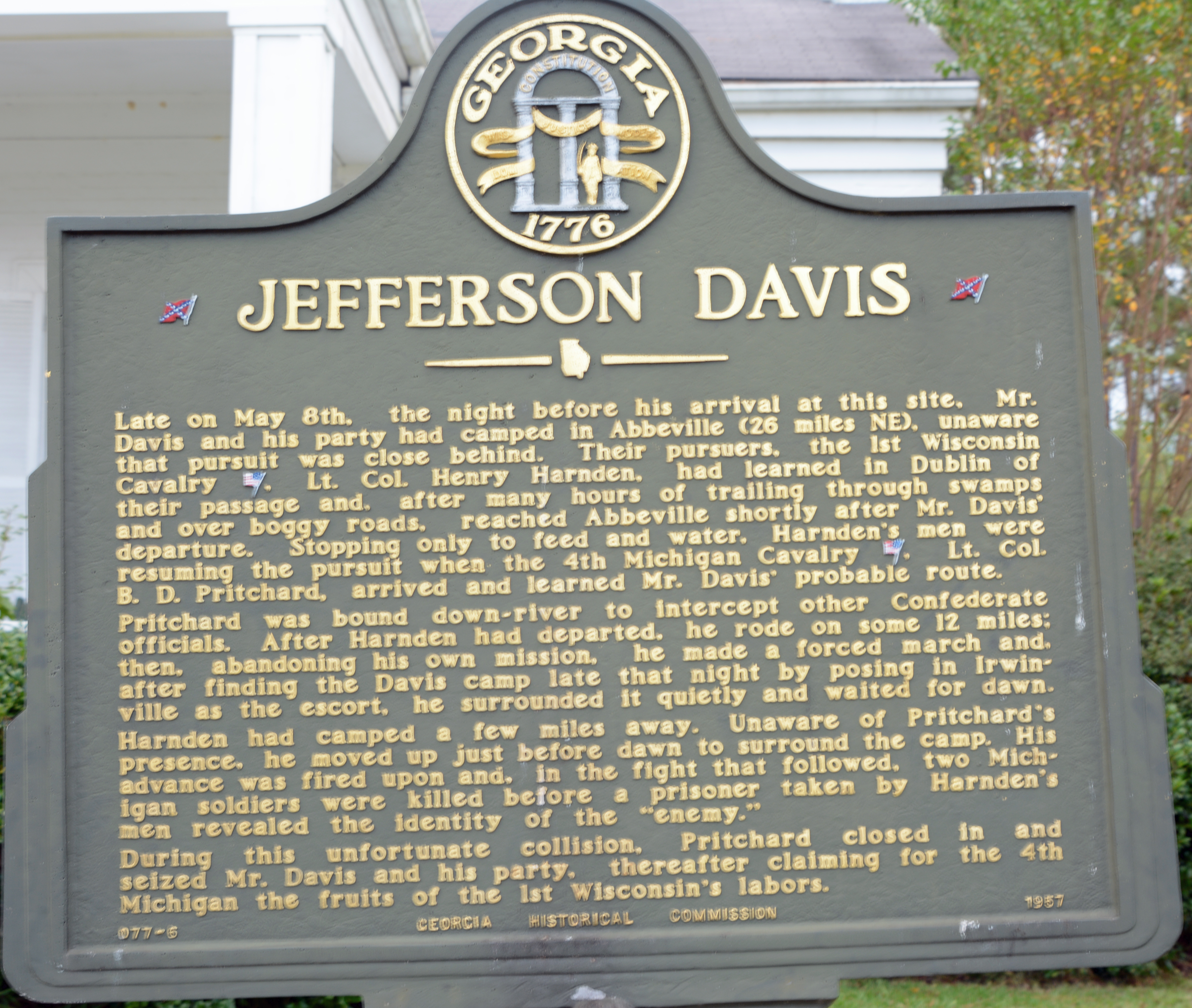
Right marker

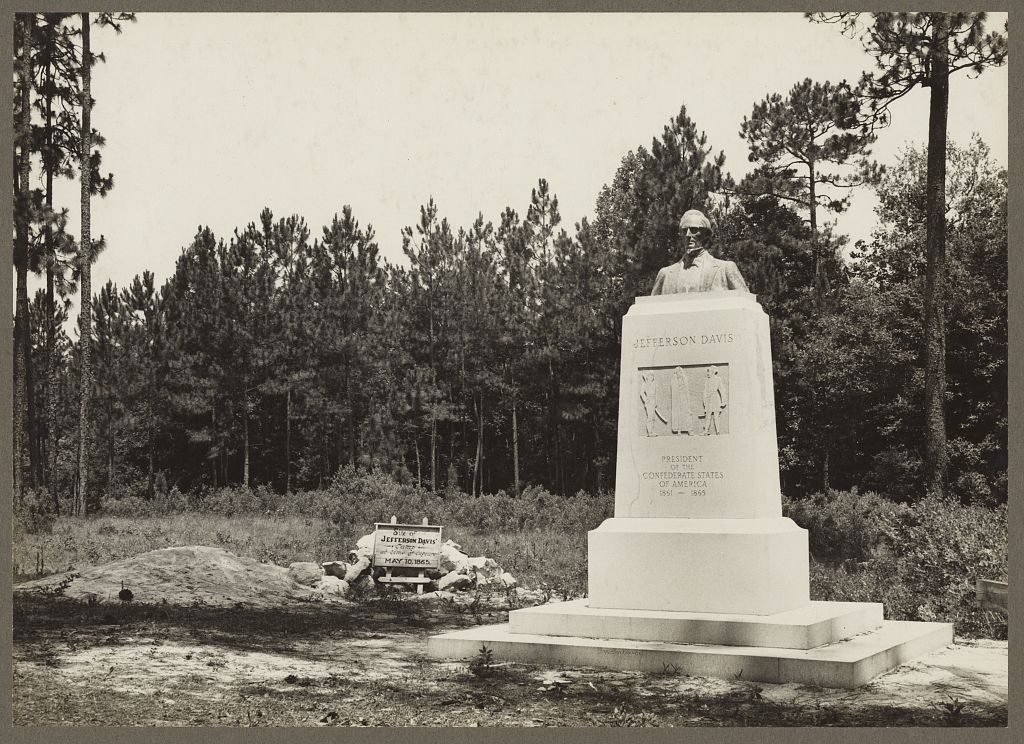
Monument in June 1936

Confederate States President Jefferson Davis fled the Confederate capital of Richmond, Virginia, on April 2. From April 3 through 10, Danville, Virginia served as the capital of the rapidly collapsing Confederacy. Accompanied by several members of his Cabinet (John H. Reagan, Judah P. Benjamin, and John C. Breckinridge), and his aide Burton Harrison, along with a military escort, the remnants of the Confederate government fled further south, passing through Greensboro and Charlotte in North Carolina and Fort Mill, York, Abbeville, and Washington in South Carolina. Davis was informed of the surrender at Appomattox on April 13 and of the assassination of Abraham Lincoln on April 18.

Davis and the remaining members of his party crossed the Savannah River into Georgia on May 3, 1865, headed for the Western and Trans-Mississippi theaters, where Davis hoped to regroup the Confederate military and continue the war. Davis arrived in Washington in Wilkes County on the same day, and dissolved the Confederate government there. By May 6, Davis reached Sandersville, and on May 7 he met his wife, Varina, and their children. With Union troops in close pursuit, Davis and his family fled through Wilcox County.

On the evening of May 9, Davis and his party reached Irwinville, in Irwin County, and camped in a pine forest (present-day Jefferson Davis Memorial Historic Site), unaware that Union soldiers were nearby. At dawn the next day, they were surrounded by the 1st Wisconsin Cavalry and the 4th Michigan Cavalry. The two Union regiments were unaware of each other's presence and engaged in a brief firefight (in which two cavalrymen died) before the forces realized that they had been shooting at one another. Davis attempted to flee to a nearby creek before being arrested by a Michigan cavalryman. Captured along with Davis and his wife were his private secretary Harrison, Postmaster General John Henninger Reagan, several other aides, and supply weapons and ambulances.

Davis was charged with treason and held in Fort Monroe, Virginia for two years, before being released.

=== Jefferson Davis Capture Site ===
The site was owned by Judge James Bagley Clements (1869–1936), who deeded four acres to the State of Georgia in 1920, "for the purposes of creating a state park." His father had bought the land after the war to ensure that "no Yankee would ever own it." Clements wrote a history of Irwin County, which included a chapter on the Davis capture and site.

The United Daughters of the Confederacy erected a monument on the exact spot where Davis was captured. It consists of a granite stele set upon a stepped granite base, the stele features relief panels and inscriptions, and atop it is a bronze bust of Davis modeled by Atlanta sculptor Laurence Tompkins. The relief on the front depicts a captured Davis flanked by two Union soldiers; the relief on the back depicts a battle scene; the reliefs on the sides depict the Confederate flag. The monument was dedicated on June 3, 1936.

The Works Progress Administration built the memorial's Civil War Museum, completed in 1939. Additional parcels of land were added, bringing the size of the park to nearly 13 acres by 1952.

The site ceased to be a Georgia state park in the mid-1970s, and was deeded to Irwin County in 1976. It was added to the National Register of Historic Places in 1980.

The monument is now surrounded by a square bed of gravel and enclosed by a low iron fence.

== Facilities ==
- Civil War Museum – film and artifacts
- Thirteen picnic sites
- Group shelter (seats 100)
- Nature trail, 1/3 mile long
- Monument
- Gift shop
- Playground

== Gallery ==
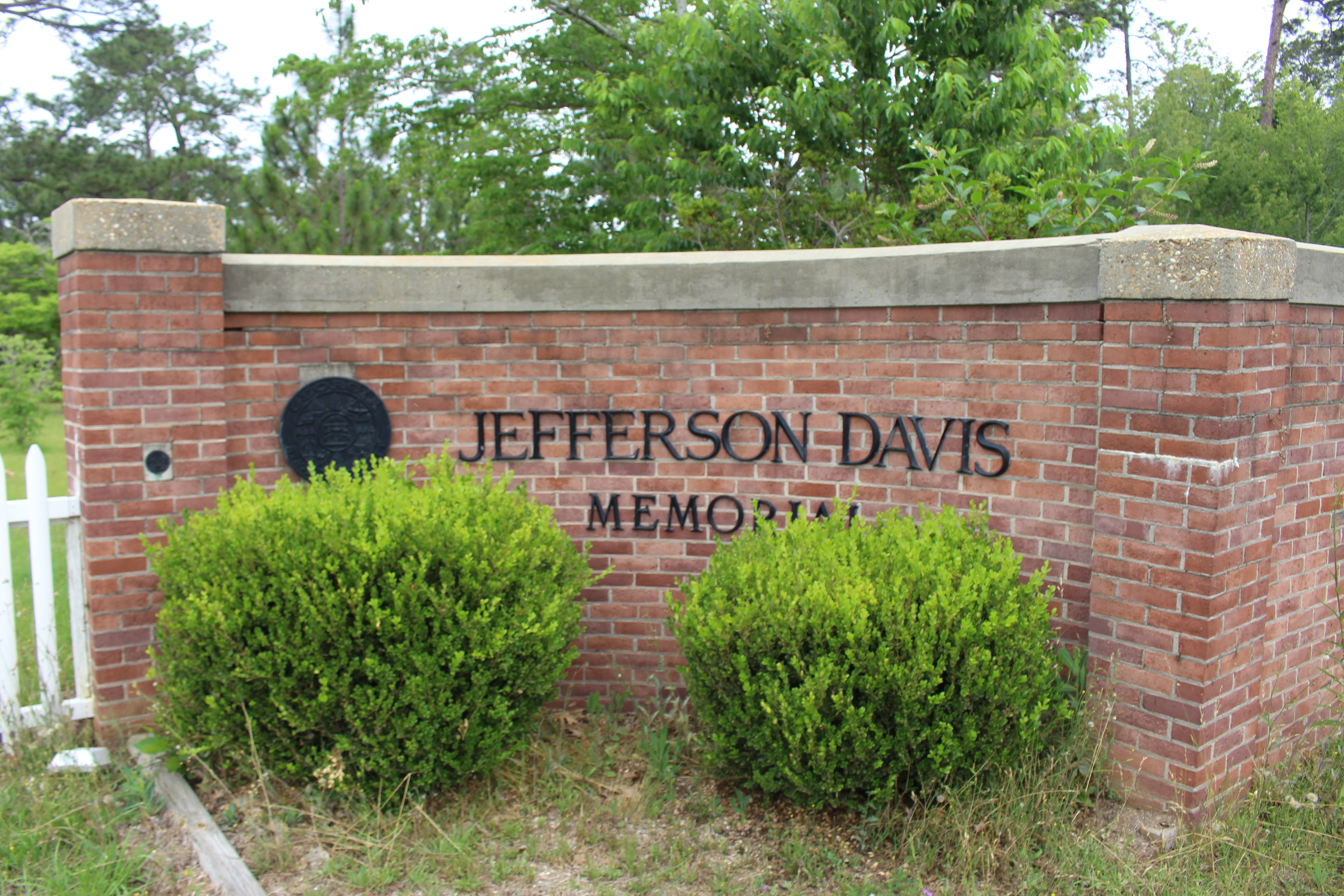
Entrance to the site from Jeff Davis Park Road

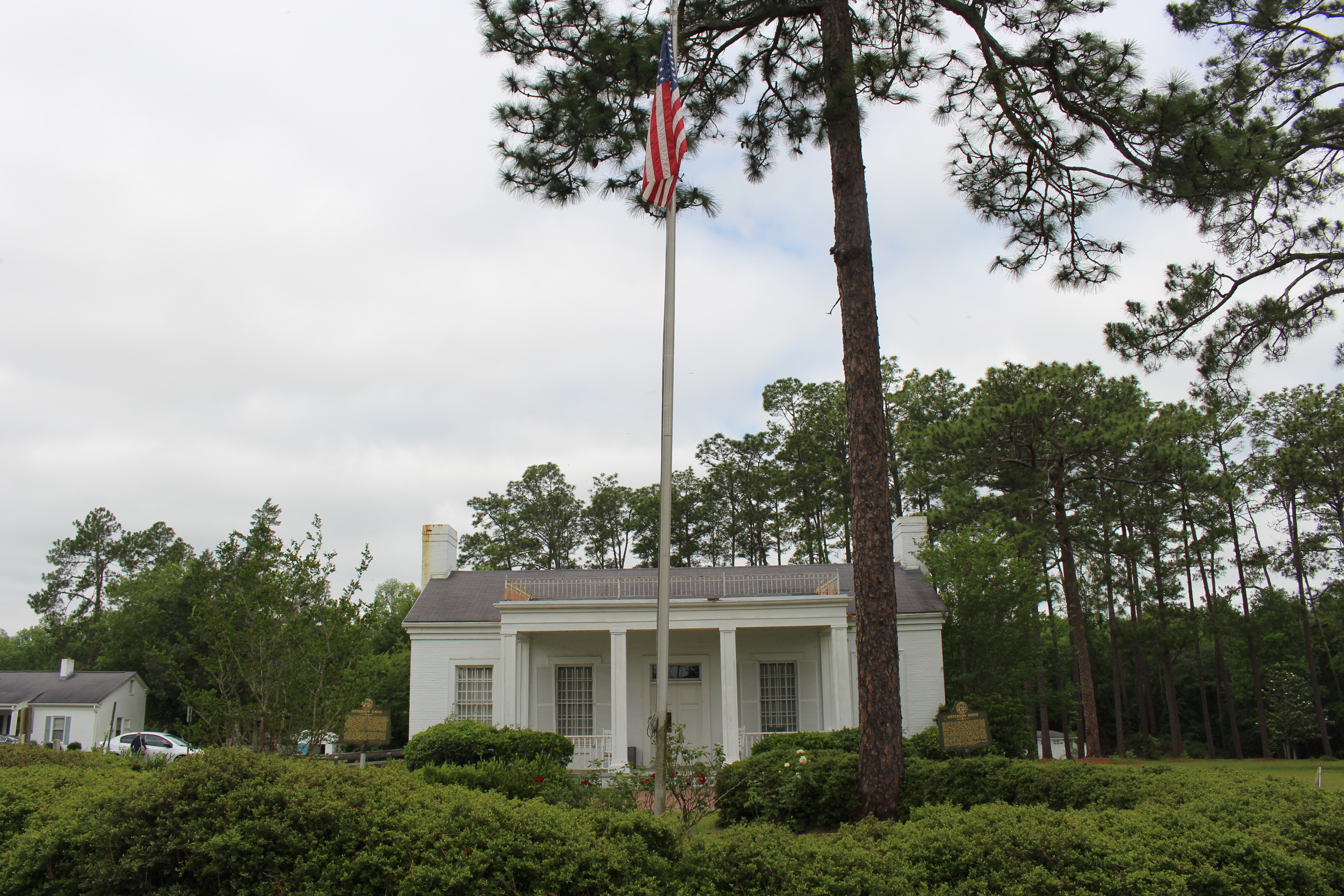
Civil War Museum at the Jefferson Davis Memorial

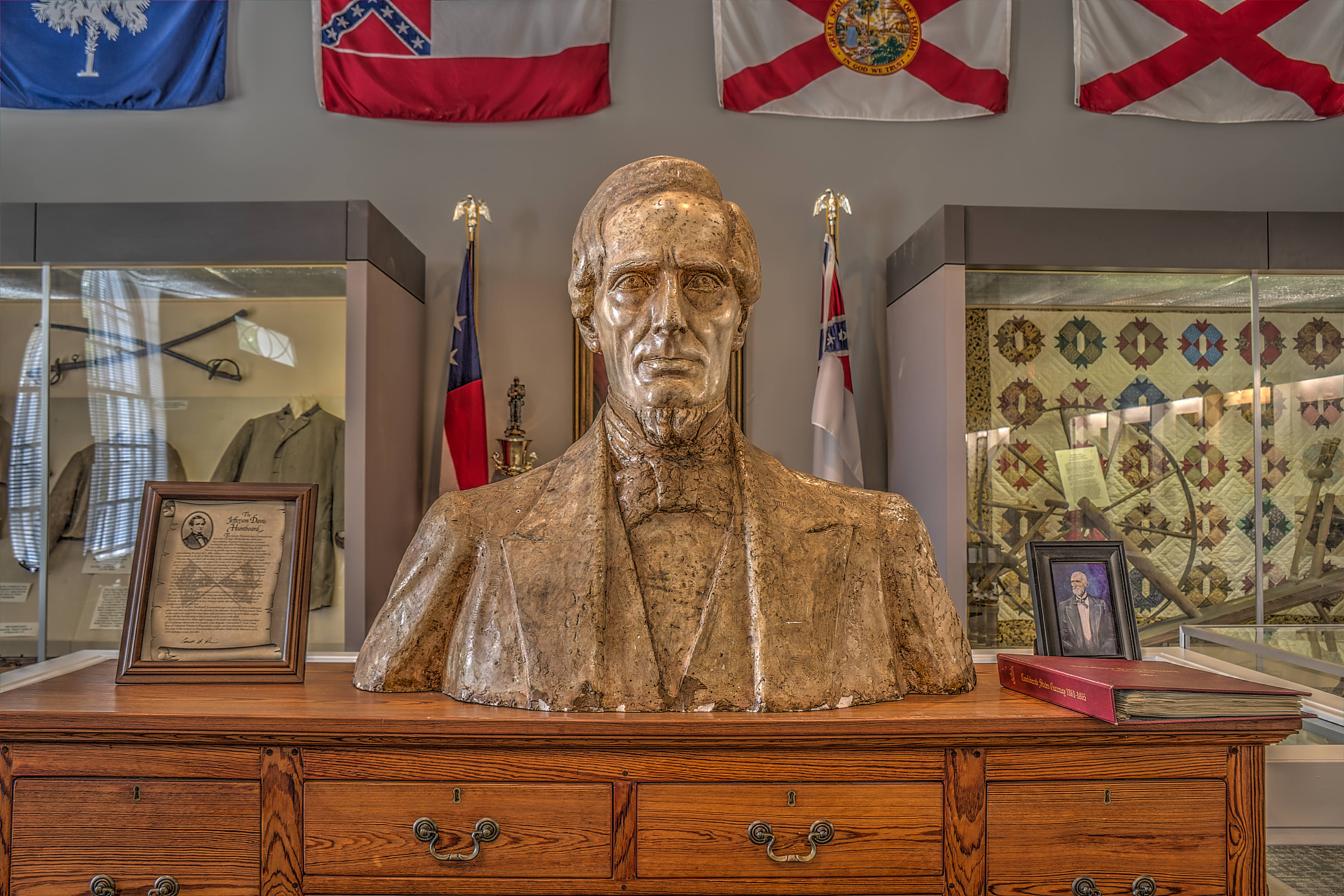
Bust of Davis inside the museum

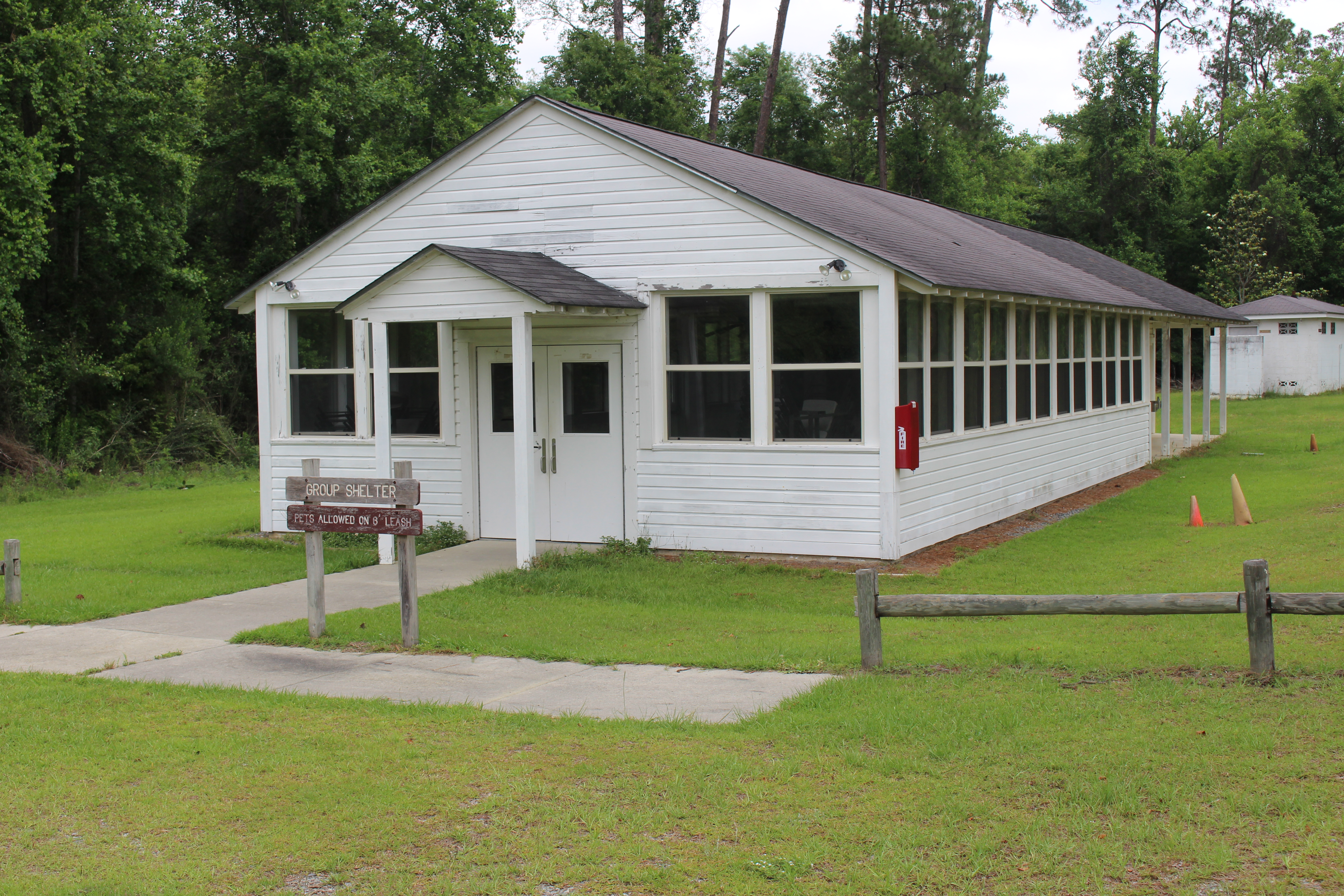
Group shelter at the Jefferson Davis Memorial

== See also ==
- List of Georgia state parks
- List of memorials to Jefferson Davis
- National Register of Historic Places listings in Irwin County, Georgia
