= 2017 Albany tornado =

Tornado in Georgia, United States

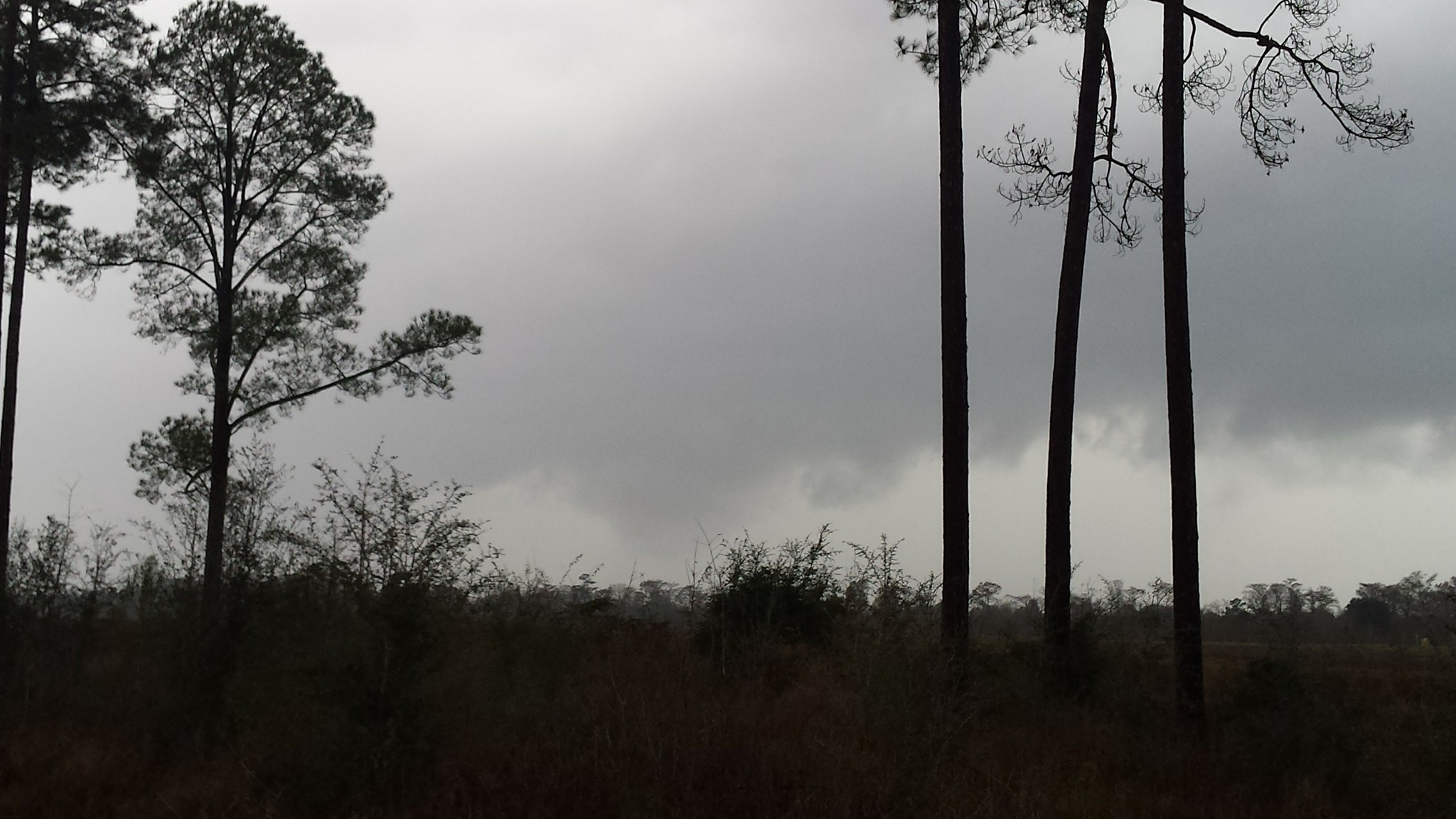
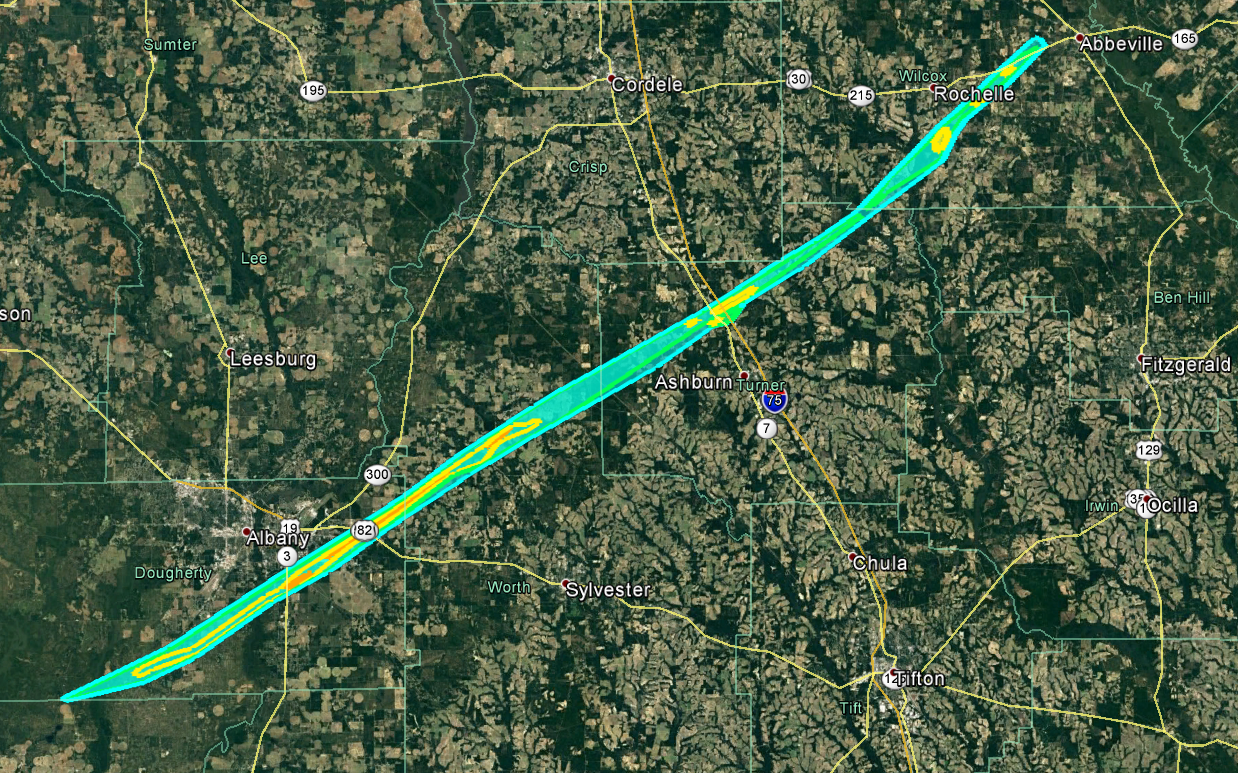
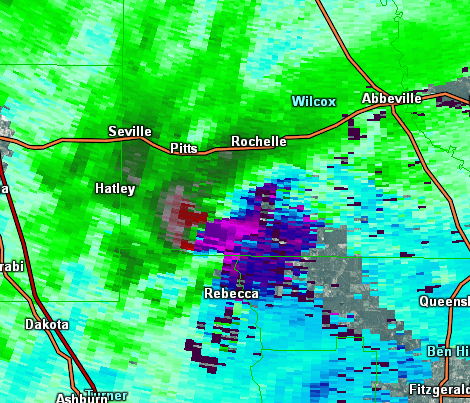
- Clockwise from top: Photo of the tornado developing in Baker County; radar imagery of the tornado entering Wilcox County at 4:09 p.m.; track of the tornado through Albany,

Meteorological history
- Formed: January 22, 2017, 3:15 p.m. EST (UTC–05:00)
- Dissipated: January 22, 2017, 4:27 p.m. EST (UTC–05:00)
- Duration: 1 hour, 12 minutes

EF3 tornado
- on the Enhanced Fujita scale
- Max width: 2,200 yards (1.3 mi; 2.0 km)
- Path length: 70.73 miles (113.83 km)
- Highest winds: 150 mph (240 km/h)

Overall effects
- Fatalities: 5
- Injuries: >40
- Missing: 1
- Damage: $310 million (2017 USD)
- Areas affected: Dougherty County (including the town of Albany, Worth County, Turner County and Wilcox County, Georgia
- Part of the Tornado outbreak of January 21–23, 2017 and Tornadoes of 2017

On January 22, 2017, a large, deadly, and destructive EF3 tornado tracked through four counties in southern Georgia, particularly causing significant damage in the city of Albany. It killed 5 people and injured at least 40 people across its 70.73 mile (113.83 kilometer) track. Lasting over an hour, the tornado began at 3:15 P.M. EDT and ended at 4:27 P.M. EDT. The tornado reached a peak width of 1.25 miles (2.01 kilometers). The tornado had a peak of 150 miles per hour (241 kilometers per hour).

At 3:15 P.M. EDT, the tornado began in southern Dougherty County. The tornado turned northeast at Cooleewahee Creek. The tornado intensified to EF2 intensity, while expanding in width. The tornado tracked into Albany, causing EF3 level damage. Continuing northeastward, it heavily damaged the west side of the Marine Corps Logistics Base within Albany. The tornado sustained EF3 winds into Worth County, damaging multiple homes and trees. The tornado weakened, but then intensified to EF3 intensity. Multiple structures were destroyed, along with a large church. It tracked south of Doles, before later entering Turner County. The tornado was mostly rural in Turner County, but still forcing a large framed home to partially slide off of its foundation at EF3 intensity, directly south of Dakota. The tornado went over rural forests near Double Run, before entering Wilcox County. A small barn was destroyed at EF2 intensity, along with structures nearby sustaining damage. The tornado began fluctuating in intensity before lifting at 4:27 P.M. EDT.

Alongside the five deaths, the tornado caused an estimated $310 million (2017 USD) in damages. Cleanup efforts began immediately afterward, and a state of emergency declared for the affected counties.

== Meteorological synopsis ==
=== Forecast ===
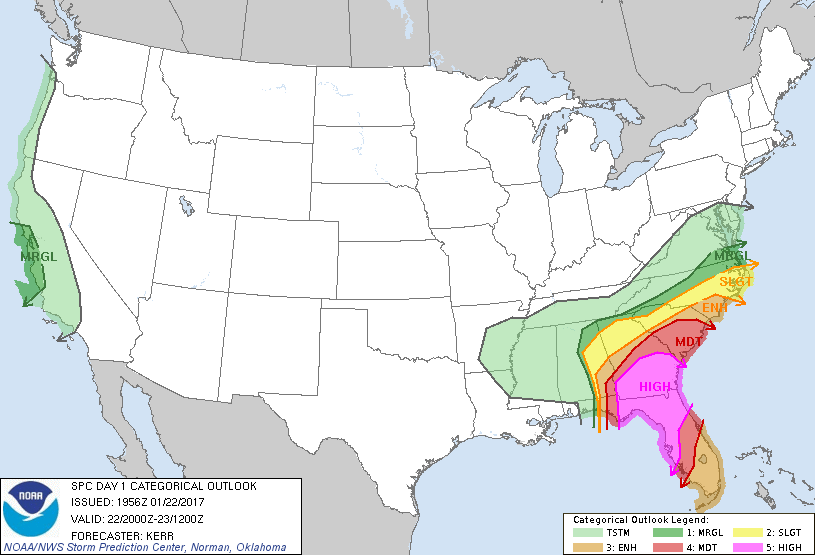
The SPC's convective outlook for January 22

A week prior to the tornado, forecasters at the Storm Prediction Center (SPC) noted the potential of severe weather on January 22. Multiple models indicated that a strong low pressure system would move across the southern United States. On January 16, the SPC outlined a 15% risk of severe weather that extended from southern Mississippi to the Florida panhandle. On January 17, 2017, the SPC noted the potential for a high-end severe weather event to occur in the Southern United States on January 21 and 22. On January 20, a large-scale, negatively tilted (aligned northwest to southeast) trough moved from the Western United States over the Great Plains, Broad cyclonic flow soon became established over much of the United States, with multiple shortwave troughs embedded within. Later in the day, a warm front—separating moisture-rich Gulf air and modified continental-polar air—developed over the southern Mississippi Valley within an environment of steep lapse rates and modest wind shear; this became the focal point for potentially tornadic storms.

=== Event narrative ===
After sunrise on January 22, the SPC issued a high risk for a major severe weather and tornado outbreak across central Florida and southeastern Georgia, including a 30% risk area for tornadoes. Strong, long-track tornadoes were expected in the threat area, and it was the first time a high risk was issued since June 3, 2014. In Florida and Georgia, a Particularly Dangerous Situation tornado watch was issued. Meteorologists at the Jacksonville, Florida branch of the National Weather Service stated that the event "had the potential to be one of the most severe weather outbreaks since the 1993 super storm" for northeastern Florida and southeastern Georgia.

“...An outbreak of severe storms and tornadoes is expected to unfold over the watch area this afternoon. Storms currently over AL and the FL panhandle will track rapidly northeastward, posing a risk of long-track significant tornadoes and widespread damaging winds.” -NWS Storm Prediction Center (SPC) January 22, 2017, 12:45 EDT Tornado watch 21

Instability and moisture grew ahead of the upper level trough allowed for the potential of showers and supercells. High CAPE, up to 1,000 J/kg, and steep lapse rates that were up to 7.5 C/km. Temperatures were near 70°F (21°C) and dew points were in the 60s F (15s C). Wind shear was up to 50 knots. These ingredients allowed for long-tracked supercells to form.

== Tornado summary ==
=== Formation in Dougherty County ===
The tornado touched down at 3:15 p.m. EST (20:15 UTC) north of Newton. The first evidence of damage was at the intersection of Tarvis Road and Tarvis Lane, where the trunks of softwood trees were snapped (consistent with an EF1 tornado). From there, the tornado moved northeast at an average of 59 mph (95 km/h), causing EF2-level tree damage adjacent to Newton Road. Hundreds of large trees were snapped, twisted, and denuded in this area. Two homes sustained minor damage to their siding, gutters, and roofs. EF2 damage continued as the tornado entered Radium Springs, where several houses lost significant portions of their roofs and sustained damage to their porches. Many trees were snapped and uprooted, a poorly constructed home on stilts was mostly collapsed, and a second house was shifted completely off its foundation and was severely damaged. The tornado then entered the eastern part of Albany, and a retail building along the Liberty Expressway had cinder block exterior walls blown out, and wooden power poles were snapped.

The tornado reached EF3 strength just past the Liberty Expressway as it impacted a one-story brick home, removing the roof and collapsing several exterior walls, snapping or uprooting almost all surrounding mature trees, and tossing a vehicle in the area. A few other homes in nearby neighborhoods also sustained significant structural damage. It then quickly weakened back to EF2 intensity as it completely destroyed the canopy of a service station, snapped large trees, tore the entire roof off of a restaurant, and severely damaged a large Procter & Gamble plant in Albany. Multiple anchored double-wide trailers were completely destroyed at the Marine Corp Logistics Base, and concrete light poles were snapped. Several semi-trailers were tossed and piled atop each other, and multiple other large metal industrial buildings sustained heavy damage in this area as well. A mobile home park community in this area was severely impacted, with multiple homes destroyed or twisted and rolled off their lots.

=== Track into Albany and peak intensity ===
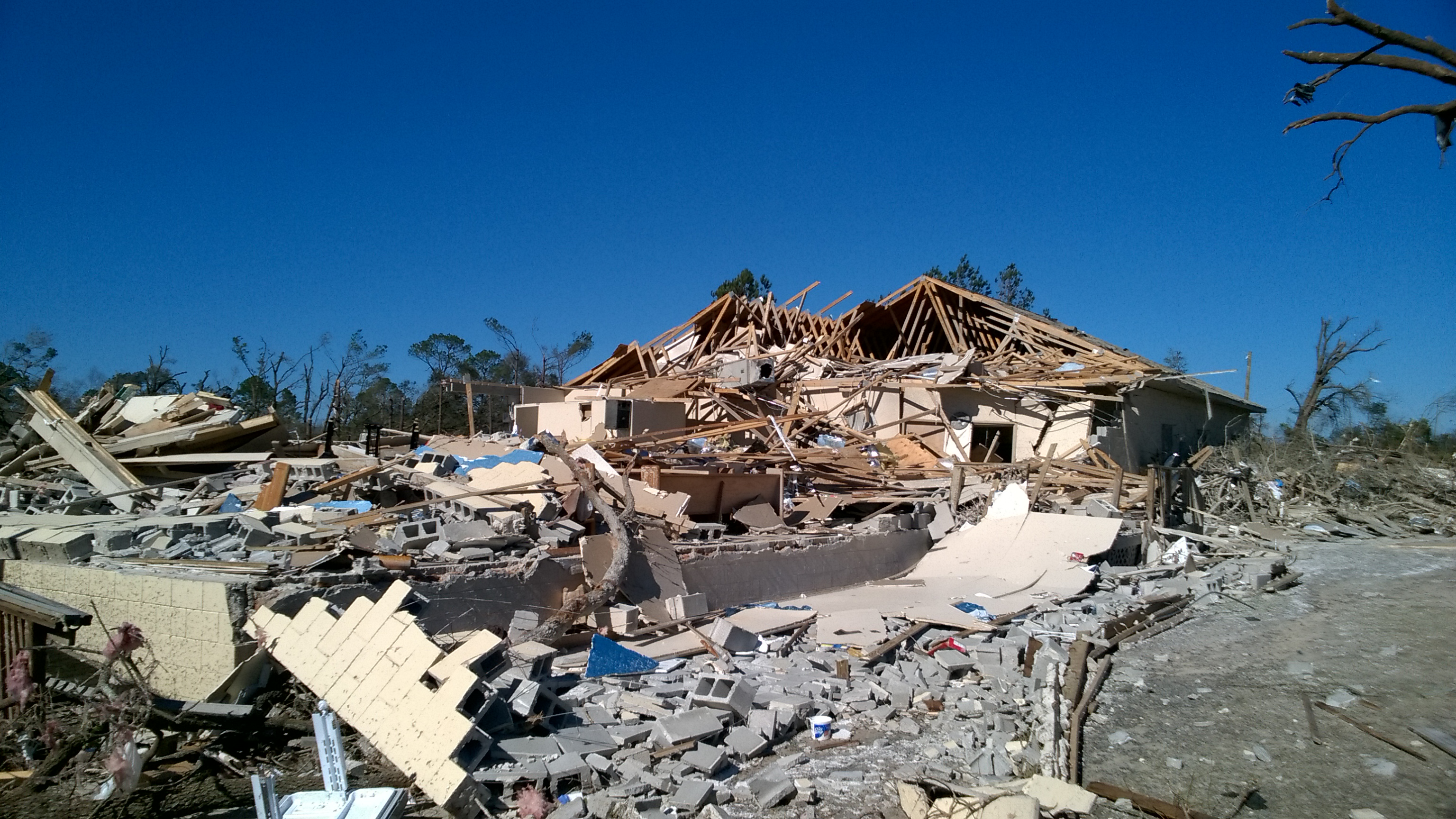
Mid-range EF3 damage to a well-constructed church in Albany.

By 3:26 p.m. EST (20:26 UTC), the large and destructive tornado continued through the eastern outskirts of Albany, prompting a Tornado Emergency for Dougherty County. It re-attained EF3 as it caused significant damage to multiple structures. A well-constructed cement block church with hurricane straps and rebar reinforcement, as well as a well-constructed frame home, both had their exterior walls collapsed; damage at these locations was consistent with winds of approximately 150 mph (240 km/h), marking the tornado's peak strength. EF2 damage was inflicted to a small residence farther northeast, where large sections of the roof was ripped off. Near the intersection of North County Line Road and Harris Road, the wedge tornado once again regained EF3 intensity as it moved through several mobile home parks, destroying numerous manufactured houses; associated debris was tossed approximately 35 yd (32 m) downwind, and four fatalities were observed. A well-anchored triple-wide mobile home was completely swept away in this area, and a cinder block business was almost entirely flattened. A small church was leveled as well. In Worth County, north of Jewell Crowe Road, several homes sustained significant damage and many large trees were twisted and snapped. A large, well-built brick home sustained low-end EF3 damage in this area as it had much of its roof ripped off and sustained some failure of exterior walls.

=== Ashburn, Wilcox County and dissipation ===
As the tornado continued northeast, it completely destroyed an outbuilding and continued to snap or uproot hundreds of hardwood trees. EF1 damage was inflicted to a double-wide mobile home that had its roof ripped off, and to another outbuilding that had its walls collapsed. Despite the tornado's abrupt weakening, it again intensified to EF3 intensity near the intersection of Zion Church Road and Blue Springs Road, where a concrete block church was leveled after its mortar failed between the blocks. After crossing into Turner County, the tornado passed near Ashburn. High-end EF2 damage was inflicted to residences that sustained roof and exterior wall loss, and evidence of a multiple-vortex structure was found. A large home on King Burgess Circle sustained EF3 damage, with two portions of the house completely collapsed and one portion completely slid off the foundation; this was the final instance of EF3 damage associated with the tornado. Mobile homes in this area were damaged or destroyed, and another frame home sustained EF2 roof damage. Tree damage became less prevalent and less severe thereafter in extreme southeastern Crisp County and northwestern Turner County.

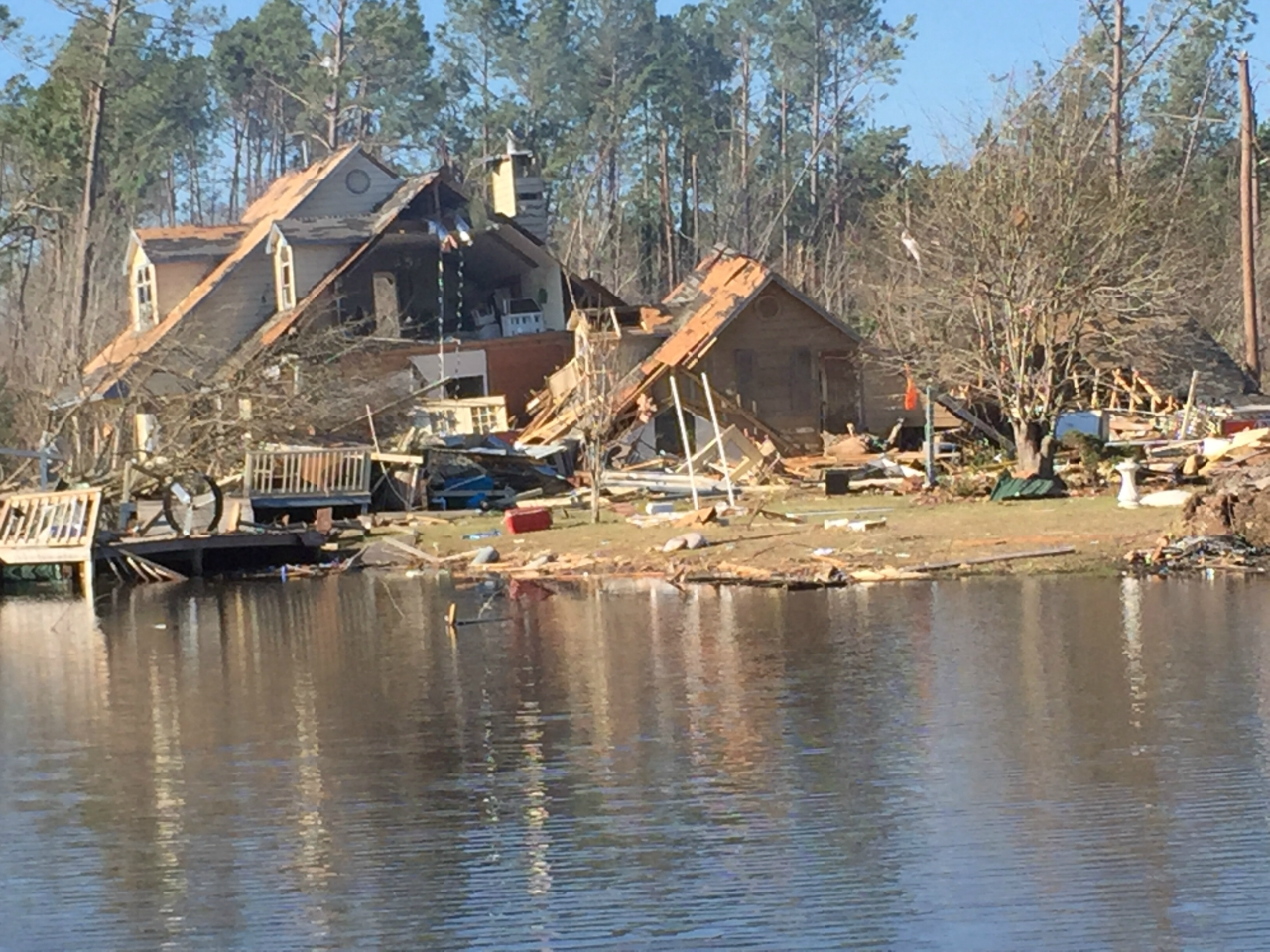
A partially collapsed home northwest of Ashburn; damage here was rated as low-end EF3.

Damage intensity varied from EF1 to EF2 in intensity as the tornado entered Wilcox County and passed near the town of Rochelle. Off Double Run Road and CR 41, a small farm building was completely destroyed. Two residences had their windows broken, and a metal building structure was severely damaged, with several anchored metal trusses ripped from the concrete foundation; this resulted in total collapse of the building. Additional metal barns and outbuildings nearby were severely damaged. Along Crawford Dairy Road, several large wooden electrical transmission towers were snapped. Farther northeast, a semi-truck trailer was flipped, flattened, and pushed across the road. Another metal building structure had its southeast corner completely destroyed, and it had a few 2 ft (0.61 m) deep concrete support beams ripped out of the ground. A small home sustained minor roof and siding damage, and several single to double-wide mobile homes were completely destroyed, with debris thrown up to 100 yd (91 m) downstream. Damage to some of the manufactured homes was consistent with a high-end EF2 tornado. The storm crossed Highway 280, destroying several small wooden sheds and fences, and downing numerous trees before finally lifting along Kingfisher Road west of Abbeville at 4:27 p.m. EST (21:27 UTC).

In total, the tornado was on the ground for 70.73 miles (113.83 km) and 72 minutes. The damage path was very wide in some areas, at times expanding to 1.25 miles (2.01 km) in width. It killed five people—including an elderly woman who succumbed to head injuries days later—and injured over 40 others.

== Aftermath ==
=== Fatalities and injuries ===
Over 40 people were injured, and 5 people were killed, over half of them in Paradise Village Mobile Home Park.

Fatalities
Name	Age	Location of death	Refs.
Patricia Ann Gohman	77	Holly Drive	
James Mosley	59	Paradise Village Mobile Home Park	
Cathy Mosley	59	Paradise Village Mobile Home Park	
Oscar Reyna	39	Paradise Village Mobile Home Park	
Paul Freeman	82	Newcomb Road	

Detrez Green, a 2-year-old boy, was separated from his mother during the tornado in Albany when a tree crashed into their home. Rescuers drained a nearby pond to attempt to find the boy, but to no avail. The search was made even more difficult per the guardians of Detrez did not possess any photos of the boy. Cadaver dogs and helicopters were also brought in for the search. Over 200 rescuers were present in the half mile search area. Rescuers searched for the boy for nearly a week before calling it off with no signs of him. Later investigations were opened into the validity of this claim as the story began to develop weak points. It is possible the child was missing before the storms came through and foul play became a strong possibility. Twenty-four firefighters from central Georgia assisted with search-and-rescue efforts in Albany in the two days following the tornado. As of January 2022, the child remained missing. The search cost for Green totaled $1,000,000 (2017 USD). The parents of Green have since refused to interact with media regarding the boy. 9 years after the disappearance of Detrez Green, on April 15, 2026, a photo of the boy was released.

=== Damage ===
At the Marine Corps Logistics Base, the tornado impacted the industrial district of the property. Multiple trailers were destroyed, and multiple light poles were snapped. Water leaked into the damaged facilities located in the base. A concrete building at the base had its concrete roof shifted 2 inches (5 centimeters). Debris was found next to armored vehicles, but the vehicles survived. One truck at the base had its back window shattered. Buildings damaged at the Marine Logistics Base totaled sixty four structures. 2 “major” buildings were totally destroyed. Gates along the perimeter of the base were blown away. Electricity was lost. Multiple vehicles were overturned. Over 700 acres of forest was impacted. The tornado’s highest rated damage occurred at a church in Dougherty County. The church was well built, yet only a few walls remained after the tornado. The tornado impacted another church in Worth County where it destroyed another church. In all, the tornado destroyed 2 churches. In the tornadoes path, 90-100% of the trees were either snapped or uprooted. In Dougherty County the tornado inflicted $300,000,000 (2017 USD) in damages. In Worth County, it caused $5,000,000 (2017 USD) in damage, and in Turner County, it also caused an estimated $5,000,000 (2017 USD) in damages. Damage totaled $310,000,000 (2017 USD).

=== Recovery efforts ===
President Trump offered his condolences and vowed to provide assistance to Georgia. Liaison officers from the Federal Emergency Management Agency were deployed to several states including Georgia. The Red Cross began mobilizing relief efforts during the afternoon of January 22 in Georgia. Georgia Governor Nathan Deal declared a state of emergency in seven impacted counties and promised to provide the aid to affected areas. Georgia Lieutenant Governor Casey Cagle estimated damage across southwestern areas of the state at $400 million. President Trump declared a major disaster for Dougherty County on January 25, supplementing a prior declaration covering straight-line wind damage incurred on January 2 in Baker, Calhoun, Dougherty, Early, Mitchell, Turner, and Worth counties. Former Governor Deal came to Albany to survey the damage. The Salvation Army set up multiple mobile feeding canteens in Albany and Columbus, where necessities were distributed. Drones were used to find debris and locate structures. In 2018, 140,000 trees were replanted. Damage, repair, and cleanup on base totaled $88,000,000 (2017 USD). By February 9, two million cubic yards of debris were cleaned up. Multiple trees were used to make wooden crosses as to symbolize faith. At the Albany Museum of Art, a new art show was set up to celebrate surviving the tornado. By June 2017, over 19,500 meals, snacks, and drinks from the Salvation Army were provided to those affected.In late October of 2020, a memorial was established in Radium Springs.

== See also ==
- List of tornado emergencies
- List of Storm Prediction Center high risk days
- 2021 Western Kentucky tornado – Another large, and long-tracked tornado in winter
- 2008 Atkins–Clinton tornado – Another long-tracked tornado early in the year
