= Turner County Jail =

Historic jail in Georgia, US

- U.S. National Register of Historic Places
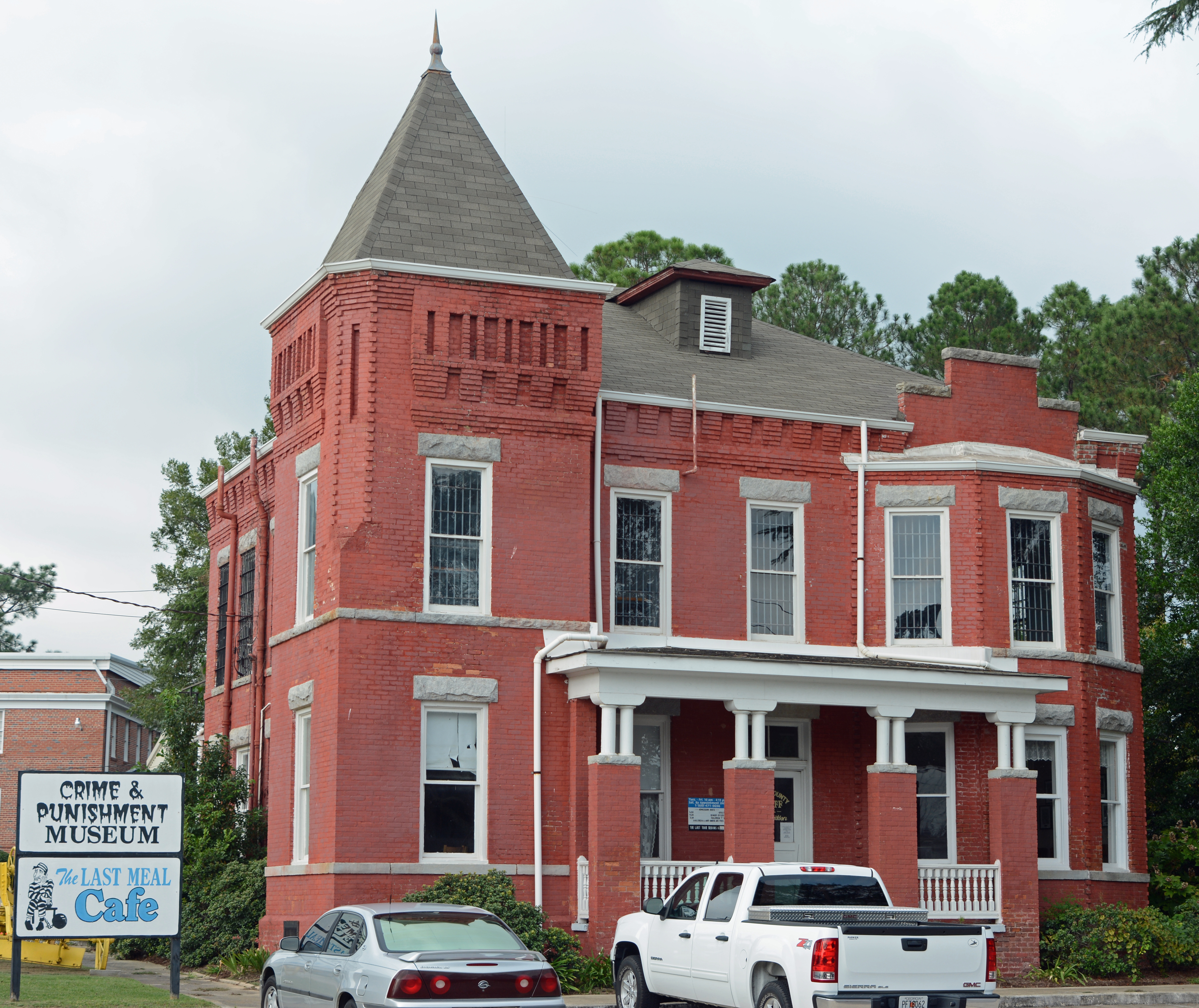
- Turner County Jail

- Location within Georgia
- Location: 243 College St., Ashburn, Georgia
- Coordinates: 31°42′29″N 83°39′8″W
- Area: less than one acre
- Built: 1906
- Architect: Wagoner & Dobson
- Architectural style: Romanesque
- MPS: County Jails of Ben Hill, Berrien, Brooks, and Turner Counties TR
- NRHP reference No.: 82002490
- Added to NRHP: August 26, 1982

Turner County Jail, also known as Turner Castle and now the Crime and Punishment Museum, and home to The Last Meal Cafe, is a historic jail building in Ashburn, Georgia. It was added to the National Register of Historic Places in 1982. The building is located at 243 College Street.

It was built in 1906-07 as the county jail for the newly formed Turner County, Georgia. It cost $10,855 and was designed by Wagoner and Dobson of Montgomery, Alabama. It is a 44 feet (13 m) by 46 feet (14 m) brick building with "elaborately corbeled entablature-like cornices". Its interior has arched corrugated metal and concrete ceilings.

== See also ==
- National Register of Historic Places listings in Turner County, Georgia
