= Turner County School District =

School district in Georgia (U.S. state)

Address
- 423 North Cleveland Street Ashburn, Georgia, 31714-5323; United States
- Coordinates: 31.709285°N 83.648552°W

District information
- Grades: Pre-school - 12
- Superintendent: Mr. Craig Matthews
- Accreditations: Southern Association of Colleges and Schools; Georgia Accrediting Commission

Students and staff
- Enrollment: 1,914
- Faculty: 126

Other information
- Telephone: (229) 567-3338
- Fax: (229) 567-3285
- Website: www.turner.k12.ga.us

The Turner County School District is a public school district in Turner County, Georgia, United States, based in Ashburn. It serves the communities of Ashburn, Rebecca, and Sycamore.

== Schools ==
The Turner County School District has one elementary school, one middle school, one high school, and one specialty school.

=== Elementary school ===
- Turner County Elementary School

=== Middle school ===
- Turner County Middle School

=== High school ===
- Turner County High School

=== Specialty school ===
- Turner County Specialty School
