= Ben Thomas (American football) =

American football player (born 1961)

No. 99, 92, 69, 72, 94
- Positions: Defensive end, nose tackle

Personal information
- Born: July 2, 1961 (age 65); Ashburn, Georgia, U.S.
- Listed height: 6 ft 4 in (1.93 m)
- Listed weight: 280 lb (127 kg)

Career information
- High school: Turner County (Ashburn)
- College: Auburn
- NFL draft: 1985: 2nd round, 56th overall pick

Career history
- New England Patriots (1985–1986); Green Bay Packers (1986-1987); Pittsburgh Steelers (1988); Atlanta Falcons (1989); Los Angeles Rams (1991)

Awards and highlights
- First-team All-SEC (1984)

Career NFL statistics
- Sacks: 3.5
- Fumble recoveries: 1
- Stats at Pro Football Reference

Benjamin Thomas Jr. (born July 2, 1961) is an American former professional football player who was a defensive lineman in the National Football League (NFL) for the Green Bay Packers, the New England Patriots, the Pittsburgh Steelers, the Atlanta Falcons and the Los Angeles Rams. Thomas played college football for the Auburn Tigers before being selected by New England in the second round of the 1985 NFL draft. He played professionally in the NFL for five seasons and retired in 1991.
