= National Register of Historic Places listings in Turner County, Georgia =

This is a list of properties and districts in Turner County, Georgia that are listed on the National Register of Historic Places (NRHP).

This National Park Service list is complete through NPS recent listings posted May 1, 2026.

== Current listings ==
	Name on the Register	Image	Date listed	Location	City or town	Description
1	Ashburn Commercial Historic District	Ashburn Commercial Historic District	August 18, 1992 (#92001042)	Roughly, Main St. between Murray and Monroe Aves. 31°42′23″N 83°39′13″W	Ashburn	
2	Ashburn Heights-Hudson-College Avenue Historic District	Ashburn Heights-Hudson-College Avenue Historic District	October 22, 1992 (#92001411)	Roughly bounded by McLendon, Phillips, Monnie, Hudson and College Aves. 31°42′41″N 83°38′59″W	Ashburn	
3	Shingler Heights Historic District	Shingler Heights Historic District	November 12, 1992 (#92001571)	N. Main St. (US 41) between Murray and Hill Aves. 31°42′48″N 83°39′26″W	Ashburn	
4	Turner County Courthouse	Turner County Courthouse	September 18, 1980 (#80001247)	Courthouse Sq. 31°42′28″N 83°39′11″W	Ashburn	Built 1907-08
5	Turner County Jail	Turner County Jail	August 26, 1982 (#82002490)	200 College St. 31°42′29″N 83°39′08″W	Ashburn	Built 1906-07
6	Wesleyan Methodist Campground and Tabernacle	Wesleyan Methodist Campground and Tabernacle	December 12, 1998 (#98001485)	321 Gordon St. 31°42′12″N 83°39′00″W	Ashburn	
