= Clay Pirkle =

American politician

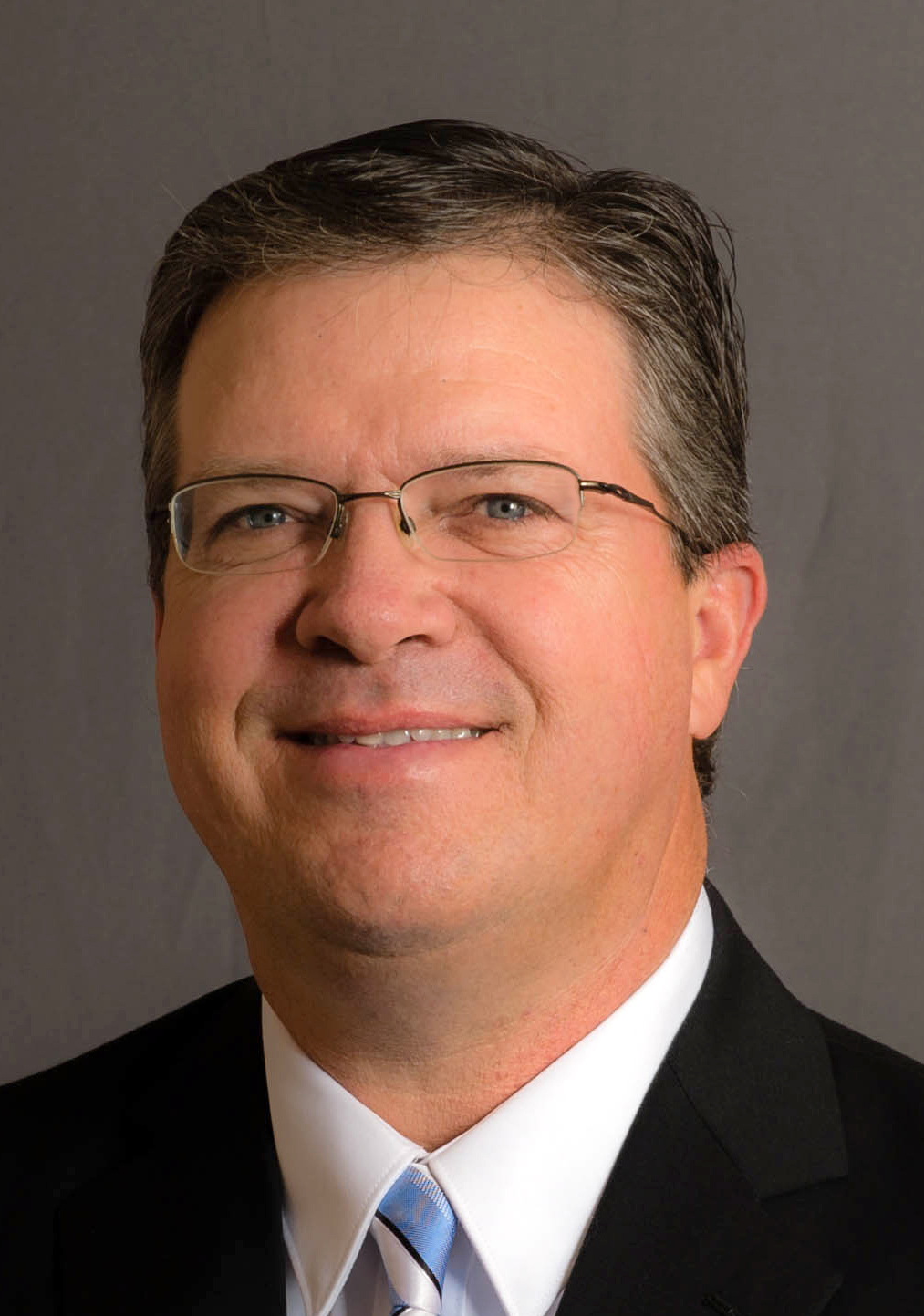

Member of the Georgia House of Representatives
- In office August 21, 2015 – January 13, 2025
- Preceded by: Jay Roberts
- Succeeded by: Angie O'Steen
- Constituency: 155th District (2015–2023); 169th District (2023–Present)

Personal details
- Born: December 28, 1967 (age 58) Sycamore, Georgia, U.S.
- Party: Republican
- Spouse: Sharon
- Children: 3
- Education: Georgia Institute of Technology University of Georgia
- Website: claypirkle.com

Clay Pirkle is an American politician. He was a Republican member of Georgia House of Representatives from District 169, representing Ben Hill, Irwin, Turner, and portions of Tift and Coffee counties.

== Personal life and education ==
Clay was raised on the family farm in Sycamore, Georgia, which has the slogan, “Christianity Is Our Business, We Farm To Pay Expenses.” Clay continues to work as a farmer on the family farm.

Clay Pirkle graduated from Georgia Institute of Technology with a Bachelor of Science degree in Economics in 1989 and from the University of Georgia with a Masters of Business Administration in Accounting and Finance in 1990.

Clay is married to his wife Sharron and together they live in Sycamore, Georgia. They have three children, Andrew, DeAnna, and Nathan.

Clay Pirkle is a member of Bethel Baptist Church, where he also serves as Deacon and Treasurer. Clay also serves as a Director for the Scott Dawson Evangelistic Association based in Birmingham, AL.

== Career ==
Clay has held positions as an Economist with the US Government, a Commercial Banker at a local bank, and an Economics Instructor at Darton State College.

Pirkle was elected into the Georgia State House of Representative in July 2015 and was sworn in on August 21, 2015. Representative Pirkle is a member of the following standing House Committees:

- Agriculture & Consumer Affairs
- Science & Technology
- State Properties.

He retired at the 2024 Georgia House of Representatives election.

Georgia House of Representatives
Preceded by Jay Roberts	Member of the Georgia House of Representatives from the 155th district 2015–2023	Succeeded by Matt Hatchett
Preceded by Dominic LaRiccia	Member of the Georgia House of Representatives from the 169th district 2023–Present	Incumbent
