= Georgia's 169th House of Representatives district =

State district in Georgia, USA

Georgia's 169th State House of Representatives district
Representative
Angie O'Steen; R–Ambrose
- Demographics: 62.2% White; 24.3% Black; 11.6% Hispanic; 0.7% Asian
- Population: 55,479

District 169 elects one member of the Georgia House of Representatives. It contains the entirety of Irwin County and Turner County, as well as parts of Coffee County and Tift County.

== Members ==
- Clay Pirkle (2023–2025)
- Angie O'Steen (since 2025)
