= Dominic LaRiccia =

American politician

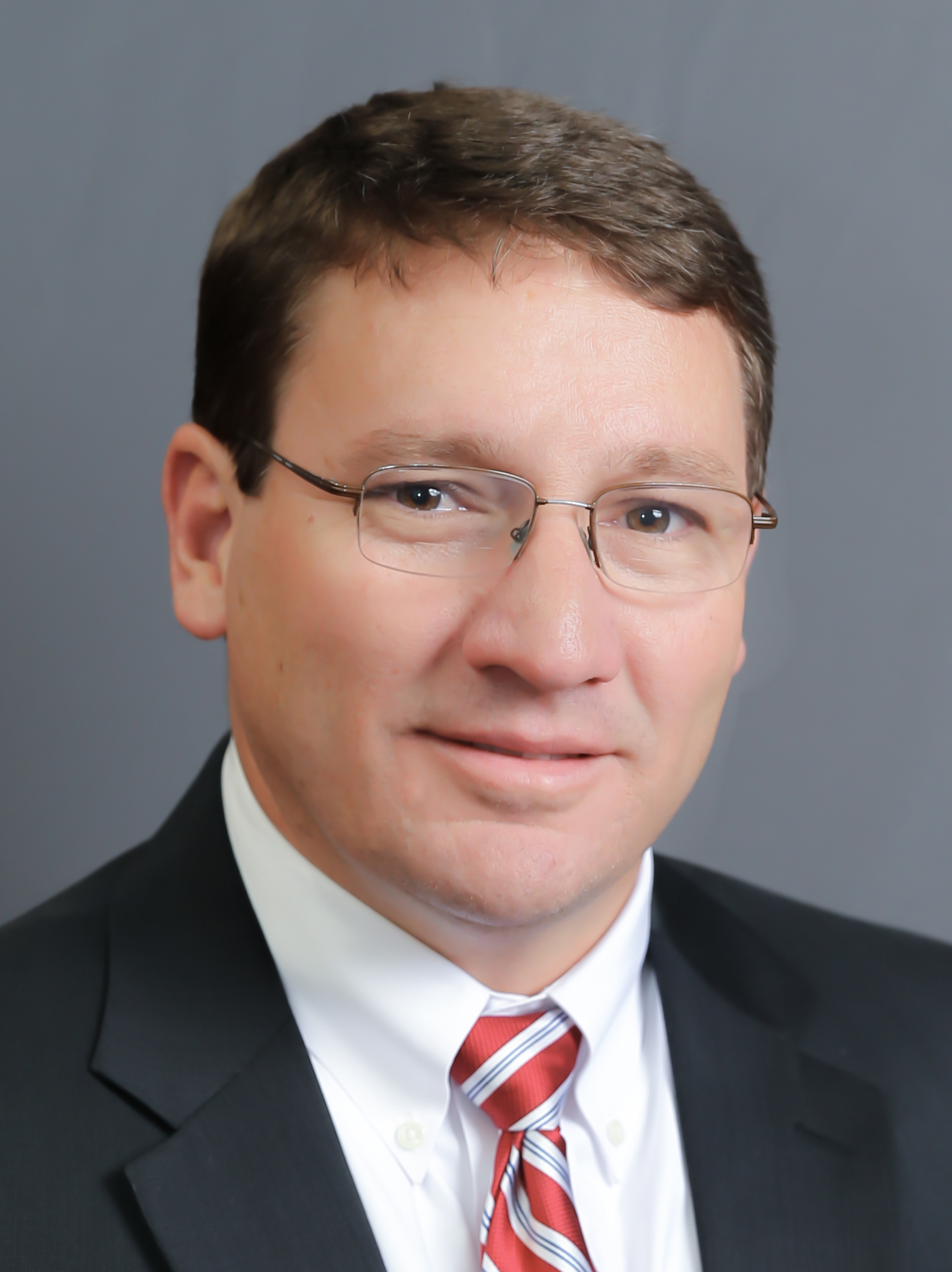

Member of the Georgia House of Representatives from the 169th district
- In office January 12, 2015 – January 9, 2023
- Preceded by: Chuck Sims
- Succeeded by: Clay Pirkle

Personal details
- Born: May 23, 1971 (age 55) Douglas, Georgia
- Party: Republican

Dominic LaRiccia (born May 23, 1971) is an American politician who served as a member of the Georgia House of Representatives for the 169th district from 2015 to 2023.

Georgia House of Representatives
Preceded by Chuck Sims	Member of the Georgia House of Representatives from the 169th district 2015–2023	Succeeded by Clay Pirkle
