= Angie O'Steen =

American politician

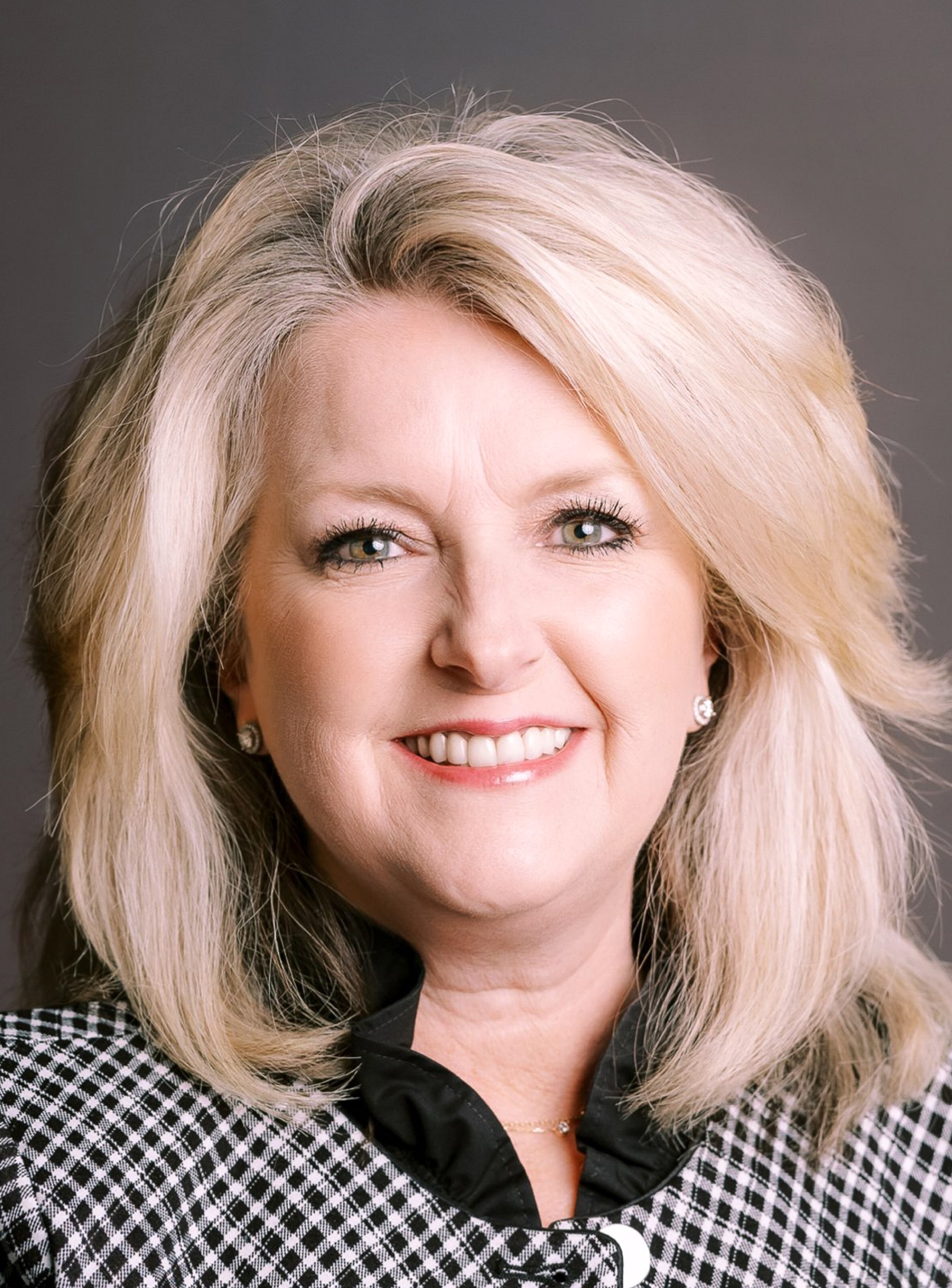
- Official headshot

Member of the Georgia House of Representatives from the 169th district
- Incumbent
- Assumed office January 13, 2025
- Succeeded by: Clay Pirkle

Personal details
- Party: Republican
- Education: Jeff Davis High School, South Georgia College
- Website: https://angieosteen.com/

Angela Butler O'Steen is an American politician who was elected a member of the Georgia House of Representatives for the 169th district in 2024.

O'Steen is a registered nurse, mother of 3 and grandmother of 1, family farmer, and community leader.
