= Dakota, Georgia =

Unincorporated community in Georgia, U.S.

Coordinates: 31°46′34″N 83°41′36″W

Dakota is an unincorporated community in Turner County, in the U.S. state of Georgia.

== History ==
Variant names were "Ada" and "Dakota Station". A post office called Ada was established in 1889, the name was changed to Dakota in 1913, and remained in operation until 1931. Besides the post office, the community had a railroad station.
