= Turner County High School =

Location
- 316 Lamar Street; Ashburn, Georgia; United States
- Coordinates: 31.7057°N 83.6416°E

Information
- Type: Public
- Established: 1957
- School district: Turner County School District
- Superintendent: Craig Matthews
- NCES School ID: 130519001712
- Principal: Jason Clark
- Staff: 29.70 (FTE)
- Grades: 9–12
- Enrollment: 342 (2023–2024)
- Student to teacher ratio: 11.52
- Colors: Royal blue, orange, white and black
- Mascot: Titan
- Website: www.turner.k12.ga.us

Turner County High School is a public high school located in Ashburn, Georgia. It is the only high school in Turner County, Georgia.

== History ==
Turner County initially had two separate high schools. In 1957, the two schools consolidated to form the current Turner County High School. At the time the school was founded, only whites were permitted to attend. Black students attended the nearby Eureka School. Shortly before the school year started, future students and teachers chose the Rebel as their mascot.

In 1954, the Supreme Court of the United States ruled in Brown v. Board of Education that segregation in public schools was unconstitutional. However, Turner County High School did not integrate until 1970. Nonetheless, the school continued to host segregated proms until 2007. In 2021, 70% of students voted in favor of changing the school's mascot to the Titan, citing ties to Confederate ideology.

== Demographics ==
The demographic breakdown by race/ethnicity of the 339 students enrolled for the 2021–2022 school year was:

- Asian – 0.3%
- Black – 64.9%
- Hispanic – 6.5%
- White – 24.5%

== Notable alumni ==
- Ontaria Wilson, professional gridiron football wide receiver
