= Double Run, Georgia =

Unincorporated community in Georgia, U.S.

Coordinates: 31°51′30″N 83°33′30″W

Double Run is an unincorporated community in Wilcox County, in the U.S. state of Georgia.

== History ==
A variant name was "Doublerun". A post office called Doublerun was established in 1902, and remained in operation until 1919. The community was so named on account of a railroad junction near the original town site.
