= Sycamore, Georgia =

- City
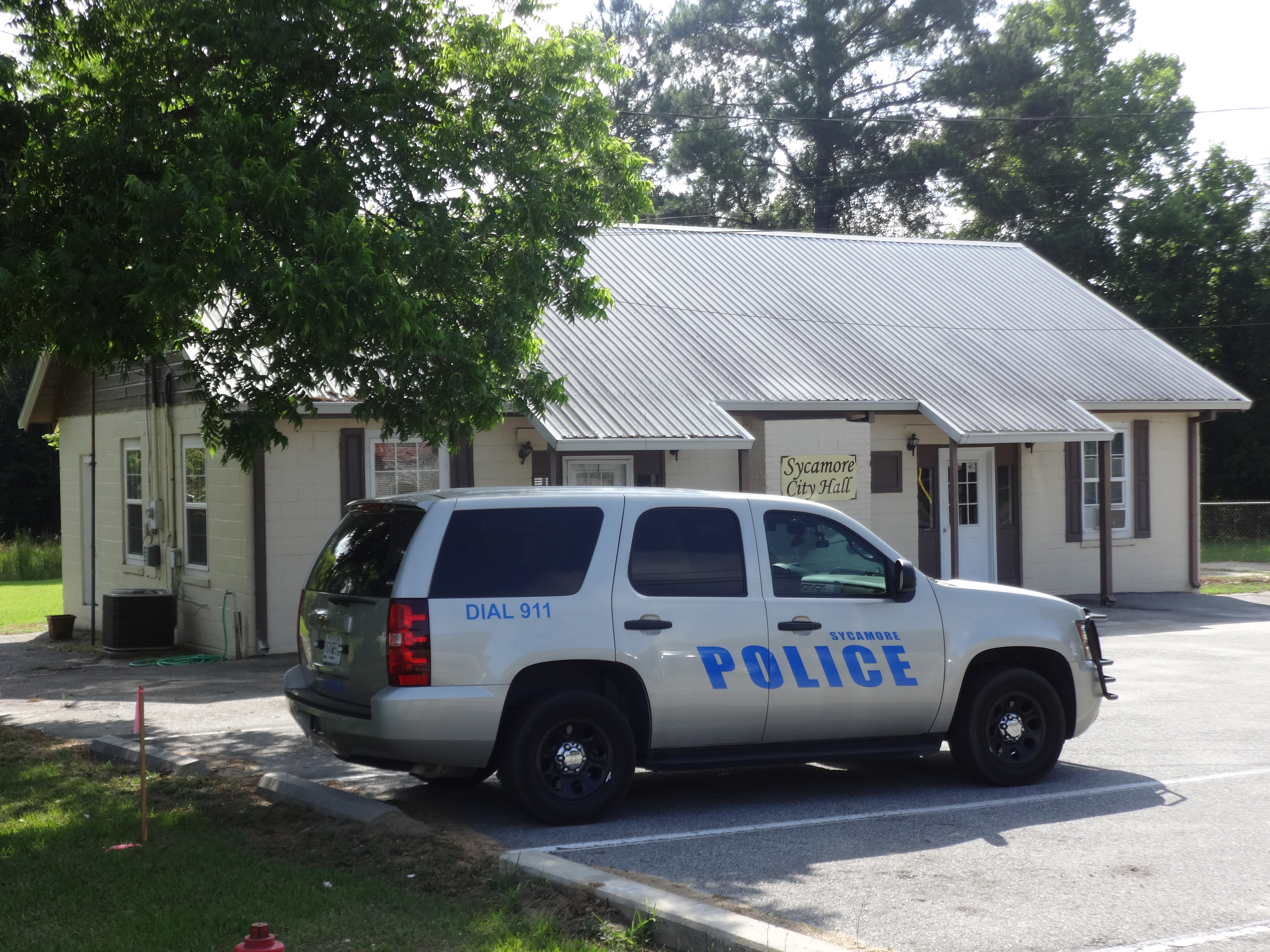
- Sycamore City Hall and Police Station

- Location in Turner County and the state of Georgia
- Coordinates: 31°40′15″N 83°38′2″W
- Country: United States
- State: Georgia
- County: Turner

Government
  - Mayor: Wayne Wooddruff

Area
  - Total: 1.02 sq mi (2.63 km^{2})
  - Land: 0.99 sq mi (2.57 km^{2})
  - Water: 0.023 sq mi (0.06 km^{2})
- Elevation: 390 ft (119 m)

Population (2020)
  - Total: 692
  - Density: 697.7/sq mi (269.37/km^{2})
- Time zone: UTC-5 (Eastern (EST))
  - Summer (DST): UTC-4 (EDT)
- ZIP code: 31790
- Area code: 229
- FIPS code: 13-75104
- GNIS feature ID: 0333176
- Website: www.sycamorega.com

Sycamore is a city in Turner County, Georgia, United States. The population was 692 in 2020.

== History ==
The Georgia General Assembly incorporated Sycamore as a town in 1891. The community was named for the American sycamore trees near the original town site.

== Geography ==
Sycamore is located at 31°40′15″N 83°38′2″W (31.670810, -83.633871). According to the United States Census Bureau, the city has a total area of 1.0 square mile (2.6 km^{2}), all land.

The climate in this area is characterized by relatively high temperatures and evenly distributed precipitation throughout the year. According to the Köppen Climate Classification system, Sycamore has a humid subtropical climate, abbreviated "Cfa" on climate maps.

== Demographics ==
Historical population
Census	Pop.	Note	%±
1900	274		—
1910	296		8.0%
1920	562		89.9%
1930	559		−0.5%
1940	601		7.5%
1950	624		3.8%
1960	501		−19.7%
1970	547		9.2%
1980	474		−13.3%
1990	417		−12.0%
2000	496		18.9%
2010	711		43.3%
2020	692		−2.7%
U.S. Decennial Census

As of the census of 2010, there were 711 people, 191 households, and 131 families residing in the city. The population density was 711 inhabitants per square mile (275/km^{2}). There were 218 housing units at an average density of 218 units per square mile (84 units/km^{2}). The racial makeup of the city was 61.7% White, 35.9% African American, 0.6% American Indian and Alaska Native, 1.81% from other races, and 0% from two or more races. Hispanic or Latino of any race were 2.8% of the population.

There were 191 households, out of which 29.3% had children under the age of 18 living with them, 52.9% were married couples living together, 10.5% had a female householder with no husband present, and 31.4% were non-families. 23.6% of all households were made up of individuals, and 10.8% had someone living alone who was 65 years of age or older. The average household size was 2.61 and the average family size was 3.11.

In the city, the population was spread out, with 21.2% under the age of 20, 11.4% from 10 to 24, 34.4% from 25 to 44, 22.4% from 45 to 64, and 10.5% who were 65 years of age or older. The median age was 33.3 years. For every 100 females, there were 189 males. For every 100 females age 18 and over, there were 214 males.

As of the census of 2010, the median income for a household in the city was $19,063, and the median income for a family was $23,750. Males had a median income of $23,750 versus $17,143 for females. The per capita income for the city was $12,346. About 14.4% of families and 25.8% of the population were below the poverty line, including 30.3% of those under age 18 and 30.9% of those age 65 or over.

== Notable people ==
- Clay Pirkle - Georgia House of Representatives, elected in 2015
- Thomas Creekmore- Entertainer and innovator of the “Creekmore Stomp”.
