= Ashburn, Georgia =

- City
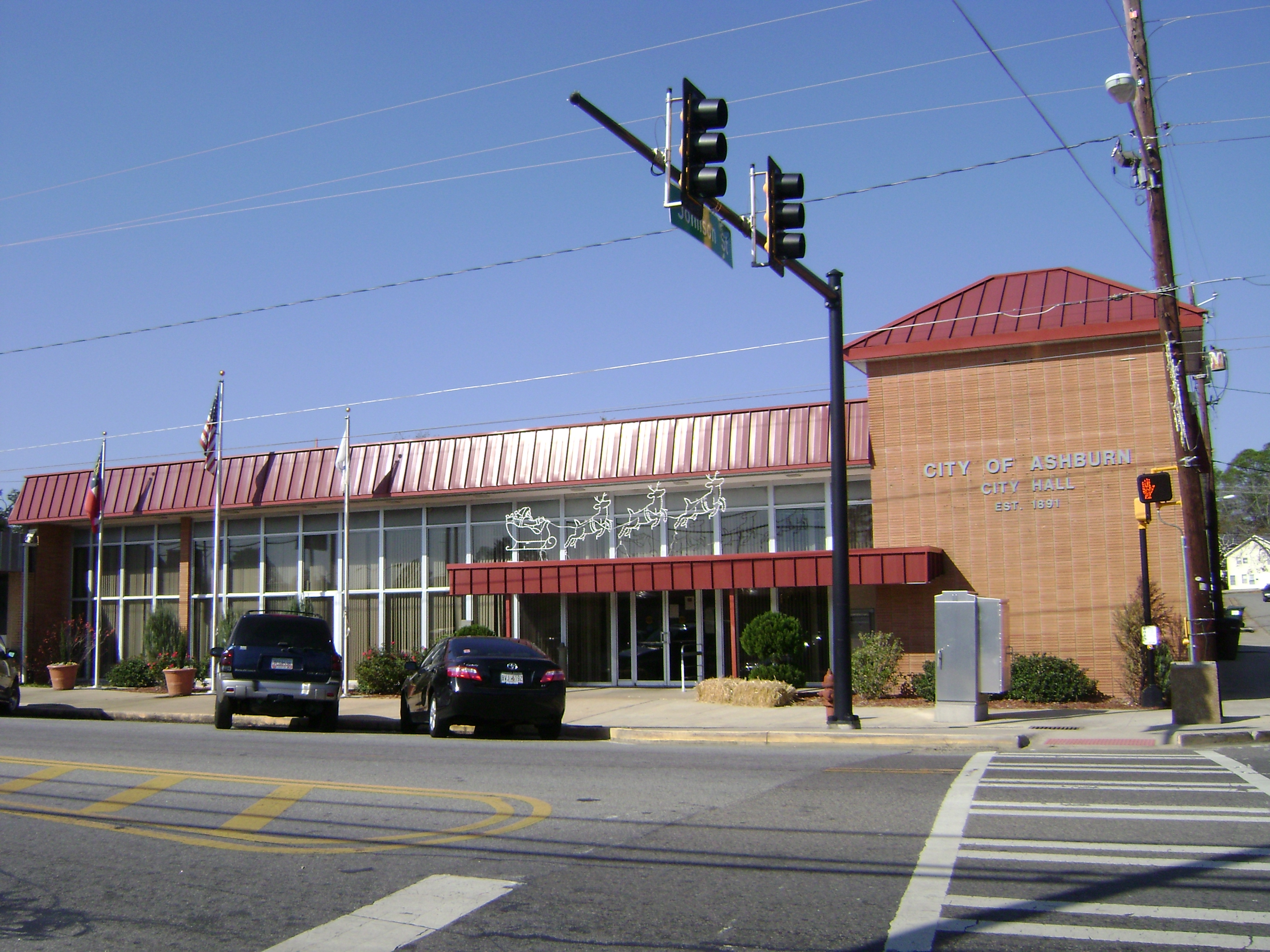
- Ashburn City Hall
- Nickname: Peanut Capital of the World
- Location in Turner County and the state of Georgia
- Coordinates: 31°42′16″N 83°39′14″W
- Country: United States
- State: Georgia
- County: Turner

Government
  - Mayor: Sandra Lumpkin

Area
  - Total: 4.80 sq mi (12.43 km^{2})
  - Land: 4.75 sq mi (12.29 km^{2})
  - Water: 0.054 sq mi (0.14 km^{2})
- Elevation: 430 ft (130 m)

Population (2020)
  - Total: 4,291
  - Density: 904.2/sq mi (349.12/km^{2})
- Time zone: UTC−5 (EST)
  - Summer (DST): UTC−4 (EDT)
- ZIP Code: 31714
- Area code: 229
- FIPS code: 13-03236
- GNIS feature ID: 0354404
- Website: https://www.cityofashburn.net

The city of Ashburn is the county seat of Turner County, Georgia, United States. As of 2020, its population was 4,291. Ashburn's government is classified as a council/manager form of municipal government.

Ashburn is noted for its peanuts and a fire ant festival.

== History ==
The town of Marion was founded in 1888, and changed its name to Ashburn when it was incorporated in 1890. Ashburn was designated seat of Turner County when it was established in 1905. The community was named after W. W. Ashburn, a pioneer citizen.

== Peanut Statue ==
In 1975, the Peanut Statue was constructed in Ashburn and was then considered an official state monument in 1998. In the year 2018 it was destroyed by Hurricane Michael. The newer peanut statue appears smaller than the original peanut statue, although the exact measurements are unknown. The woods that the original peanut was next to was cleared out, and the small picnic table as seen in the first image was presumably destroyed by Hurricane Michael, the same hurricane that destroyed the original peanut statue.

The small tower constructed of brick was reused for the newer peanut statue, as was the crown. The original peanut statue was made of fiberglass. The brick tower is 15 feet tall and has a crown attached to it.

Legal Publications for the City of Ashburn is The Wiregrass Farmer.

== Geography ==
Ashburn is located at 31°42′16″N 83°39′14″W (31.704378, -83.653786).

According to the United States Census Bureau, the city has a total area of 4.6 square miles (12 km^{2}), of which 4.5 square miles (12 km^{2}) is land and 0.04 square miles (0.10 km^{2}) (0.66%) is water.

== Demographics ==
Historical population
| Census | Pop. | Note | %± |
|---|---|---|---|
| 1890 | 403 | | — |
| 1900 | 1,301 | | 222.8% |
| 1910 | 2,214 | | 70.2% |
| 1920 | 2,116 | | −4.4% |
| 1930 | 2,073 | | −2.0% |
| 1940 | 2,266 | | 9.3% |
| 1950 | 2,918 | | 28.8% |
| 1960 | 3,291 | | 12.8% |
| 1970 | 4,209 | | 27.9% |
| 1980 | 4,766 | | 13.2% |
| 1990 | 4,827 | | 1.3% |
| 2000 | 4,419 | | −8.5% |
| 2010 | 4,152 | | −6.0% |
| 2020 | 4,291 | | 3.3% |
U.S. Decennial Census; 1850-1870 1870-1880; 1890-1910 1920-1930; 1940 1950 1960; 1970 1980 1990; 2000 2010

=== 2020 census ===
As of the 2020 census, Ashburn had a population of 4,291. The median age was 38.9 years. 25.2% of residents were under the age of 18 and 18.0% of residents were 65 years of age or older. For every 100 females there were 85.3 males, and for every 100 females age 18 and over there were 80.4 males age 18 and over.

93.8% of residents lived in urban areas, while 6.2% lived in rural areas.

There were 1,736 households, including 1,061 family households, in Ashburn. Of all households, 32.8% had children under the age of 18 living in them, 28.3% were married-couple households, 20.2% were households with a male householder and no spouse or partner present, and 44.4% were households with a female householder and no spouse or partner present. About 34.4% of all households were made up of individuals, and 15.5% had someone living alone who was 65 years of age or older.

There were 1,933 housing units, of which 10.2% were vacant. The homeowner vacancy rate was 3.0% and the rental vacancy rate was 7.7%.

Ashburn racial composition as of 2020
| Race | Num. | Perc. |
|---|---|---|
| White (non-Hispanic) | 1,109 | 25.84% |
| Black or African American (non-Hispanic) | 2,831 | 65.98% |
| Native American | 3 | 0.07% |
| Asian | 37 | 0.86% |
| Other/Mixed | 119 | 2.77% |
| Hispanic or Latino | 192 | 4.47% |

== Education ==
=== Schools ===
Ashburn residents are served by the Turner County School District which offers pre-school through grade twelve education, and has one elementary school, a middle school, a high school, and a speciality school. The district has 126 full-time teachers and over 1,145 students.

- Turner County Elementary School
- Turner County Middle School
- Turner County High School

=== Library ===
Ashburn is served by a public library, the Victoria Evans Memorial Library.

== Events ==
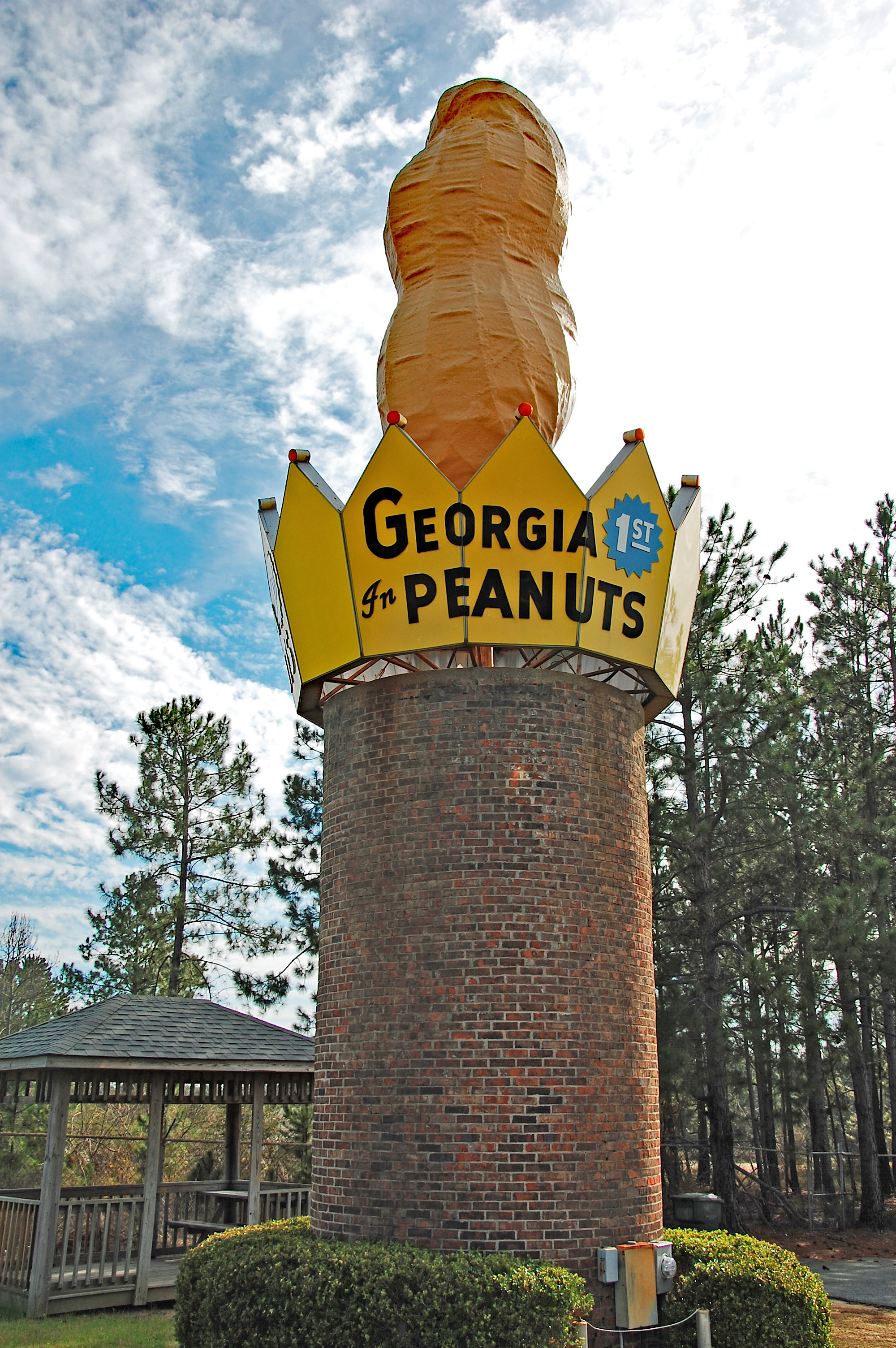
The original peanut statue

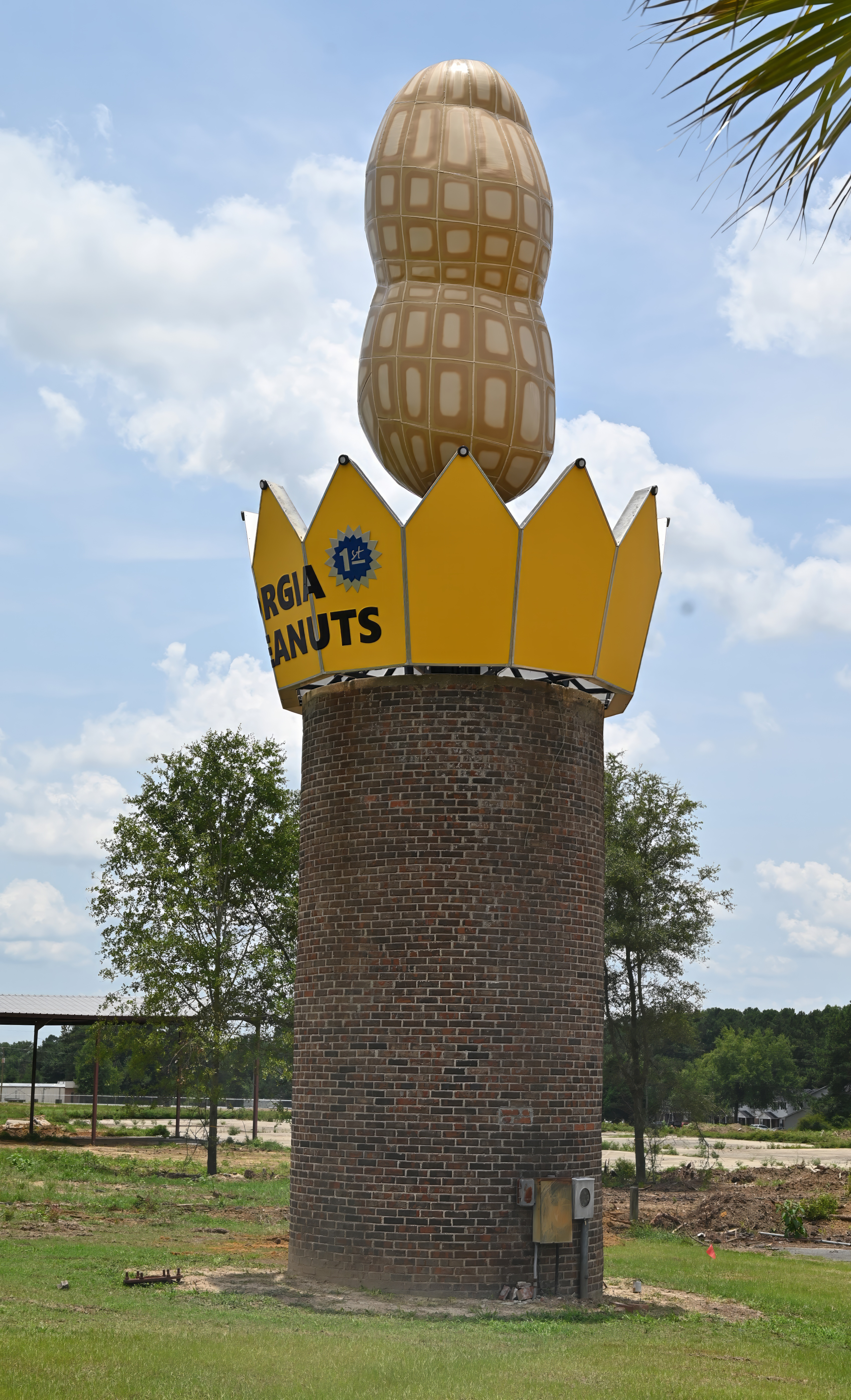
Peanut statue rebuilt in 2023

Every fourth weekend in March, Ashburn holds the Fire Ant Festival. This offers an art show, carnival rides, a car show, strawberry cook off, BBQ competition, health show, and fireworks. Some events are tailored to the festival itself, such as the Fire Ant Call, Find the Fire Ant, Fire Ant 5k, and Miss Fire Ant Pageant.

== Notable people ==
- Henry T. Elrod - World War II fighter pilot posthumously awarded the Medal of Honor
- Nora Lawrence Smith - editor and publisher of Wiregrass Farmer for decades
- Betty Shingler Talmadge - First Lady of Georgia
- Ben Thomas - former Auburn University and National Football League defensive lineman
