= Turner County, Georgia =

County in Georgia, United States

- County
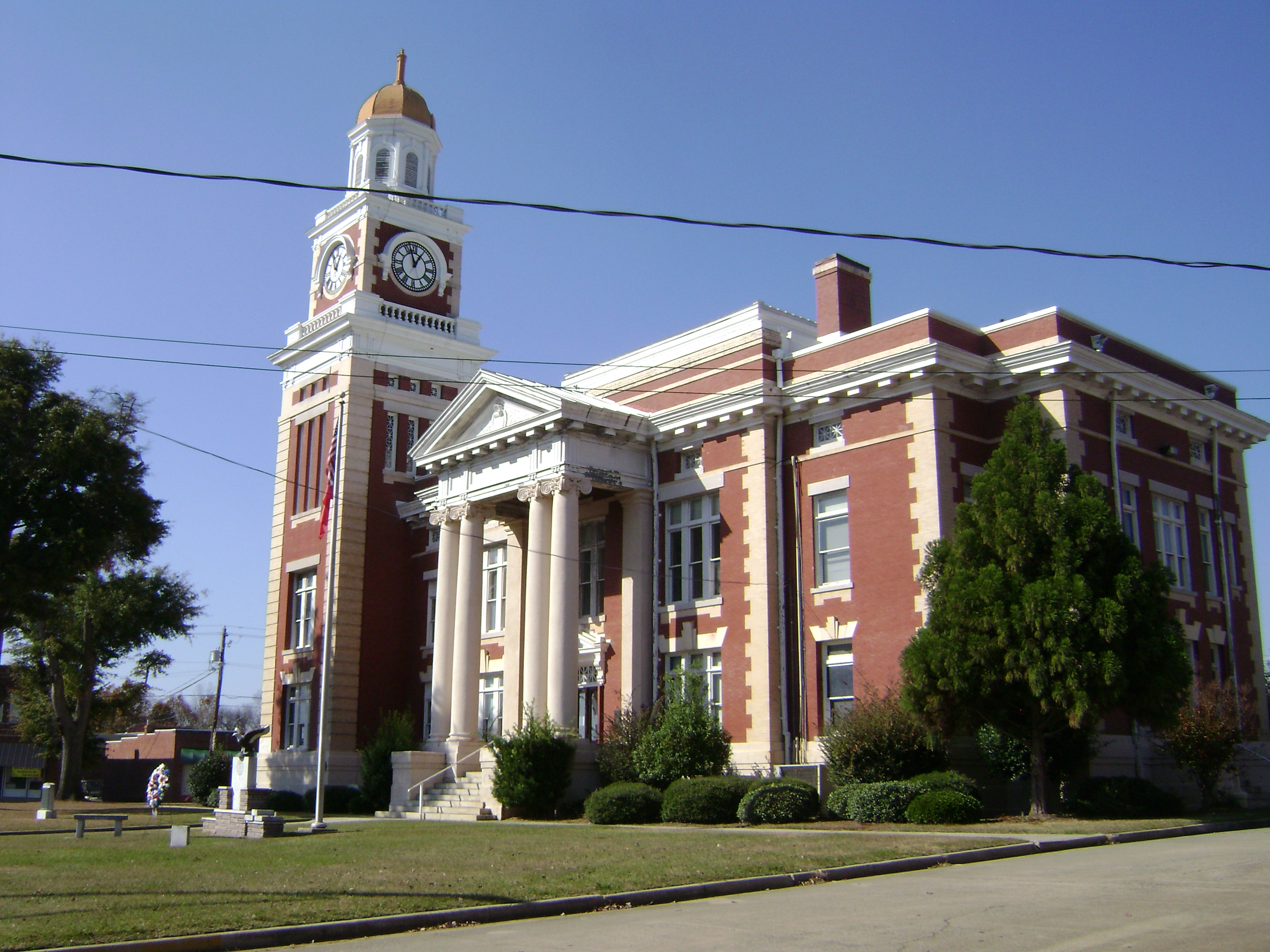
- Turner County Courthouse (Built 1907), Ashburn

- Flag

- Location within the U.S. state of Georgia
- Coordinates: 31°43′N 83°38′W
- Country: United States
- State: Georgia
- Founded: August 18, 1905; 121 years ago
- Named for: Henry G. Turner
- Seat: Ashburn
- Largest city: Ashburn

Area
  - Total: 290 sq mi (750 km^{2})
  - Land: 285 sq mi (740 km^{2})
  - Water: 4.6 sq mi (12 km^{2}) 1.6%

Population (2020)
  - Total: 9,006
  - Estimate (2054): 8,983 ▼
  - Density: 31.6/sq mi (12.2/km^{2})
- Time zone: UTC−5 (Eastern)
  - Summer (DST): UTC−4 (EDT)
- Congressional district: 8th
- Website: www.turnercountygeorgia.com

Turner County is a county located in the south central portion of the U.S. state of Georgia. As of the 2020 census, the population was 9,006. The county seat is Ashburn. The county was created on August 18, 1905, and named for Henry G. Turner, U.S. representative and Georgia state Supreme Court justice.

== Geography ==
According to the U.S. Census Bureau, the county has a total area of 290 square miles (750 km^{2}), of which 285 square miles (740 km^{2}) is land and 4.6 square miles (12 km^{2}) (1.6%) is water.

The eastern two-thirds of Turner County, from just west of Interstate 75 heading east, are located in the Alapaha River sub-basin of the Suwannee River basin. The southern and western portion of the county are located in the Little River sub-basin of the same Suwannee River basin. The entire western edge of Turner County is located in the Middle Flint River sub-basin of the ACF River Basin (Apalachicola-Chattahoochee-Flint River Basin).

=== Major highways ===
- Interstate 75 / State Route 401 (unsigned)
- U.S. Route 41 / State Route 7
- State Route 32
  - State Route 32 Connector
- State Route 90
- State Route 107
- State Route 112
- State Route 159

=== Adjacent counties ===
- Wilcox County (northeast)
- Ben Hill County (east)
- Irwin County (east)
- Tift County (southeast)
- Worth County (southwest)
- Crisp County (northwest)

== Communities ==
=== Cities/Unincorporated Communities ===
- Ashburn (county seat)
- Rebecca
- Dakota
- Amboy
- Coverdale
- Sycamore
- Live Oak
- Sibley

== Demographics ==
Historical population
Census	Pop.	Note	%±
1910	10,075		—
1920	12,466		23.7%
1930	11,196		−10.2%
1940	10,846		−3.1%
1950	10,479		−3.4%
1960	8,439		−19.5%
1970	8,790		4.2%
1980	9,510		8.2%
1990	8,703		−8.5%
2000	9,504		9.2%
2010	8,930		−6.0%
2020	9,006		0.9%
2025 (est.)	8,983	▼	−0.3%
U.S. Decennial Census; 1790-1880 1890-1910; 1920-1930 1930-1940; 1940-1950 1960-1980; 1980-2000 2010

=== Racial and ethnic composition ===
Troup County, Georgia – Racial and ethnic composition Note: the US Census treats Hispanic/Latino as an ethnic category. This table excludes Latinos from the racial categories and assigns them to a separate category. Hispanics/Latinos may be of any race.
Race / Ethnicity (NH = Non-Hispanic)	Pop 1980	Pop 1990	Pop 2000	Pop 2010	Pop 2020	% 1980	% 1990	% 2000	% 2010	% 2020
White alone (NH)	5,968	5,118	5,315	4,820	4,700	62.75%	58.81%	55.92%	53.98%	52.19%
Black or African American alone (NH)	3,446	3,525	3,868	3,697	3,644	36.24%	40.50%	40.70%	41.40%	40.46%
Native American or Alaska Native alone (NH)	3	5	14	19	7	0.03%	0.06%	0.15%	0.21%	0.08%
Asian alone (NH)	11	20	31	40	49	0.12%	0.23%	0.33%	0.45%	0.54%
Native Hawaiian or Pacific Islander alone (NH)	x	x	0	0	0	x	x	0.00%	0.00%	0.00%
Other race alone (NH)	0	0	3	22	25	0.00%	0.00%	0.03%	0.25%	0.28%
Mixed race or Multiracial (NH)	x	x	29	50	209	x	x	0.31%	0.56%	2.32%
Hispanic or Latino (any race)	82	35	244	282	372	0.86%	0.40%	2.57%	3.16%	4.13%
Total	9,510	8,703	9,504	8,930	9,006	100.00%	100.00%	100.00%	100.00%	100.00%

=== 2020 census ===
As of the 2020 census, the county had a population of 9,006, 3,512 households, and 2,297 families, and the median age was 40.7 years. 22.7% of residents were under the age of 18 and 18.2% of residents were 65 years of age or older. For every 100 females there were 95.7 males, and for every 100 females age 18 and over there were 93.7 males age 18 and over. 52.6% of residents lived in urban areas, while 47.4% lived in rural areas.

The racial makeup of the county was 53.4% White, 40.7% Black or African American, 0.1% American Indian and Alaska Native, 0.6% Asian, 0.0% Native Hawaiian and Pacific Islander, 1.9% from some other race, and 3.3% from two or more races. Hispanic or Latino residents of any race comprised 4.1% of the population.

Of the 3,512 households in the county, 32.5% had children under the age of 18 living with them and 34.4% had a female householder with no spouse or partner present. About 28.4% of all households were made up of individuals and 12.6% had someone living alone who was 65 years of age or older.

There were 3,916 housing units, of which 10.3% were vacant. Among occupied housing units, 64.7% were owner-occupied and 35.3% were renter-occupied. The homeowner vacancy rate was 2.0% and the rental vacancy rate was 6.9%.

== Notable people ==
- Henry T. Elrod, Medal of Honor recipient.

== Politics ==
As of the 2020s, Turner County is a Republican stronghold, voting 64% for Donald Trump in 2024. For elections to the United States House of Representatives, Turner County is part of Georgia's 8th congressional district, currently represented by Austin Scott. For elections to the Georgia State Senate, Turner County is part of District 13. For elections to the Georgia House of Representatives, Turner County is part of District 169.

United States presidential election results for Turner County, Georgia
Year	Republican		Democratic		Third party(ies)	
Year	No.	%	No.	%	No.	%
1912	54	11.54%	382	81.62%	32	6.84%
1916	172	23.99%	400	55.79%	145	20.22%
1920	182	31.65%	393	68.35%	0	0.00%
1924	166	30.97%	338	63.06%	32	5.97%
1928	526	61.59%	328	38.41%	0	0.00%
1932	59	6.04%	909	93.04%	9	0.92%
1936	188	17.94%	860	82.06%	0	0.00%
1940	351	30.60%	791	68.96%	5	0.44%
1944	334	29.51%	797	70.41%	1	0.09%
1948	147	12.86%	774	67.72%	222	19.42%
1952	402	22.85%	1,357	77.15%	0	0.00%
1956	354	20.21%	1,398	79.79%	0	0.00%
1960	328	17.51%	1,545	82.49%	0	0.00%
1964	1,672	69.93%	719	30.07%	0	0.00%
1968	419	15.66%	412	15.40%	1,845	68.95%
1972	2,120	82.91%	437	17.09%	0	0.00%
1976	416	15.52%	2,265	84.48%	0	0.00%
1980	898	30.74%	1,990	68.13%	33	1.13%
1984	1,329	51.14%	1,270	48.86%	0	0.00%
1988	1,312	50.52%	1,122	43.20%	163	6.28%
1992	936	30.95%	1,669	55.19%	419	13.86%
1996	924	37.64%	1,272	51.81%	259	10.55%
2000	1,258	51.22%	1,169	47.60%	29	1.18%
2004	1,815	61.21%	1,135	38.28%	15	0.51%
2008	2,096	58.94%	1,427	40.13%	33	0.93%
2012	2,028	56.85%	1,510	42.33%	29	0.81%
2016	2,095	61.53%	1,246	36.59%	64	1.88%
2020	2,349	61.96%	1,409	37.17%	33	0.87%
2024	2,457	64.10%	1,365	35.61%	11	0.29%

United States Senate election results for Turner County, Georgia2
Year	Republican		Democratic		Third party(ies)	
Year	No.	%	No.	%	No.	%
2020	2,334	62.39%	1,345	35.95%	62	1.66%
2020	2,105	61.73%	1,305	38.27%	0	0.00%

United States Senate election results for Turner County, Georgia3
Year	Republican		Democratic		Third party(ies)	
Year	No.	%	No.	%	No.	%
2020	1,310	35.21%	866	23.27%	1,545	41.52%
2020	2,349	62.49%	1,410	37.51%	0	0.00%
2022	1,892	61.31%	1,152	37.33%	42	1.36%
2022	1,745	62.48%	1,048	37.52%	0	0.00%

Georgia Gubernatorial election results for Turner County
Year	Republican		Democratic		Third party(ies)	
Year	No.	%	No.	%	No.	%
2022	1,994	64.34%	1,083	34.95%	22	0.71%

== Education ==
The Turner County School District includes the Turner County Elementary School, Turner County Middle School, and Turner County High School.

== See also ==
- National Register of Historic Places listings in Turner County, Georgia
- List of counties in Georgia
