= List of diplomatic missions of Japan =

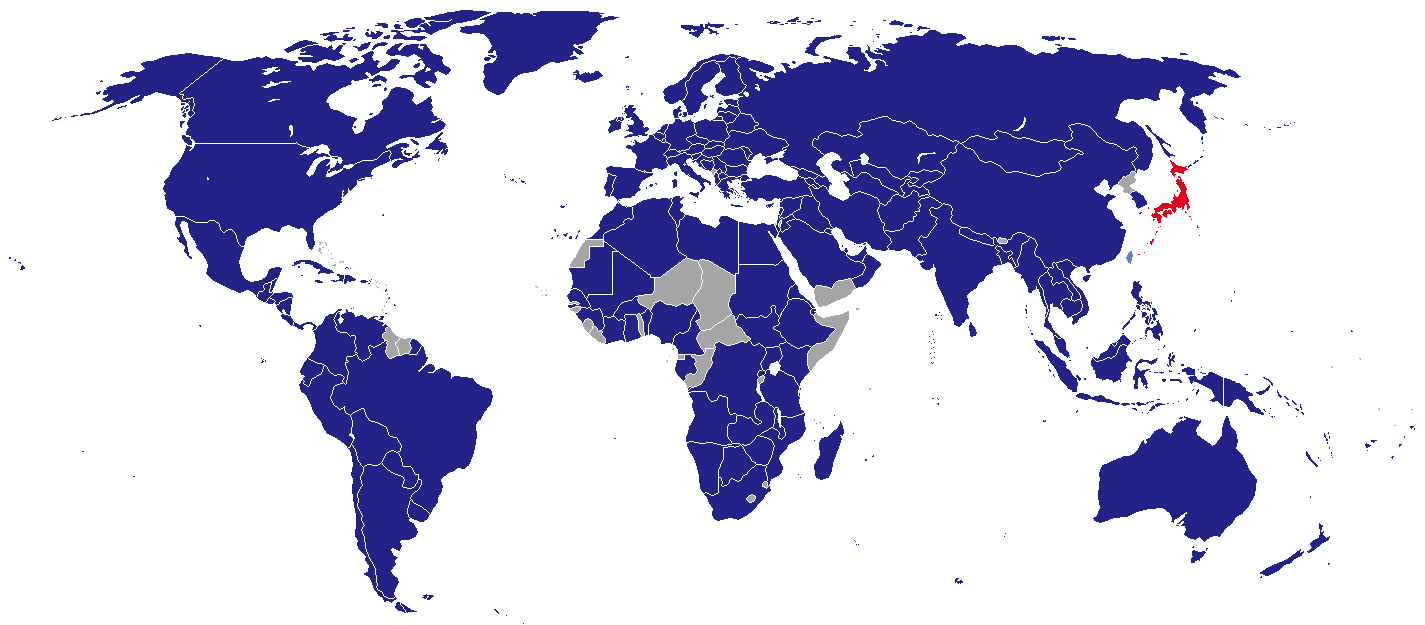
Diplomatic missions of Japan

This is a list of diplomatic missions of Japan. Japan sent ambassadors to the Tang Chinese court in Xi'an since 607 AD, as well as to the Koryo and Joseon dynasties of early Korea. For centuries, early modern Japan did not actively seek to expand its foreign relations. The first Japanese ambassadors to a Western country travelled to Spain in 1613.

Honorary consulates are excluded from this listing.

== Current missions ==
=== Africa ===
Host country	Host city	Mission	Concurrent accreditation	Ref.
Algeria	Algiers	Embassy		
Angola	Luanda	Embassy		
Benin	Cotonou	Embassy		
Botswana	Gaborone	Embassy	International Organizations: Southern African Development Community (Note: Accredited as an observer mission.)	
Burkina Faso	Ouagadougou	Embassy		
Cameroon	Yaoundé	Embassy	Countries: Central African Republic; Chad	
Congo-Kinshasa	Kinshasa	Embassy	Countries: Congo-Brazzaville	
Djibouti	Djibouti City	Embassy		
Egypt	Cairo	Embassy	Countries: Sudan	
Eritrea	Asmara	Embassy		
Ethiopia	Addis Ababa	Embassy		
Gabon	Libreville	Embassy	Countries: Equatorial Guinea; São Tomé and Príncipe	
Ghana	Accra	Embassy	Countries: Liberia; Sierra Leone	
Guinea	Conakry	Embassy		
Ivory Coast	Abidjan	Embassy	Countries: Niger; Togo	
Kenya	Nairobi	Embassy	Countries: Burundi; Somalia; International Organizations: United Nations; United Nations Environment Programme; United Nations Human Settlements Programme	
Libya	Tripoli	Embassy		
Madagascar	Antananarivo	Embassy	Countries: Comoros	
Malawi	Lilongwe	Embassy		
Mali	Bamako	Embassy		
Mauritania	Nouakchott	Embassy		
Mauritius	Port Louis	Embassy		
Morocco	Rabat	Embassy		
Mozambique	Maputo	Embassy		
Namibia	Windhoek	Embassy		
Nigeria	Abuja	Embassy		
Rwanda	Kigali	Embassy	Countries: Burundi	
Senegal	Dakar	Embassy	Countries: Cape Verde; Gambia; Guinea-Bissau	
Seychelles	Victoria	Embassy		
South Africa	Pretoria	Embassy	Countries: Eswatini; Lesotho	
South Africa	Cape Town	Consular office	Countries: Eswatini; Lesotho	
South Sudan	Juba	Embassy		
Tanzania	Dar es Salaam	Embassy		
Tunisia	Tunis	Embassy		
Uganda	Kampala	Embassy		
Zambia	Lusaka	Embassy		
Zimbabwe	Harare	Embassy		

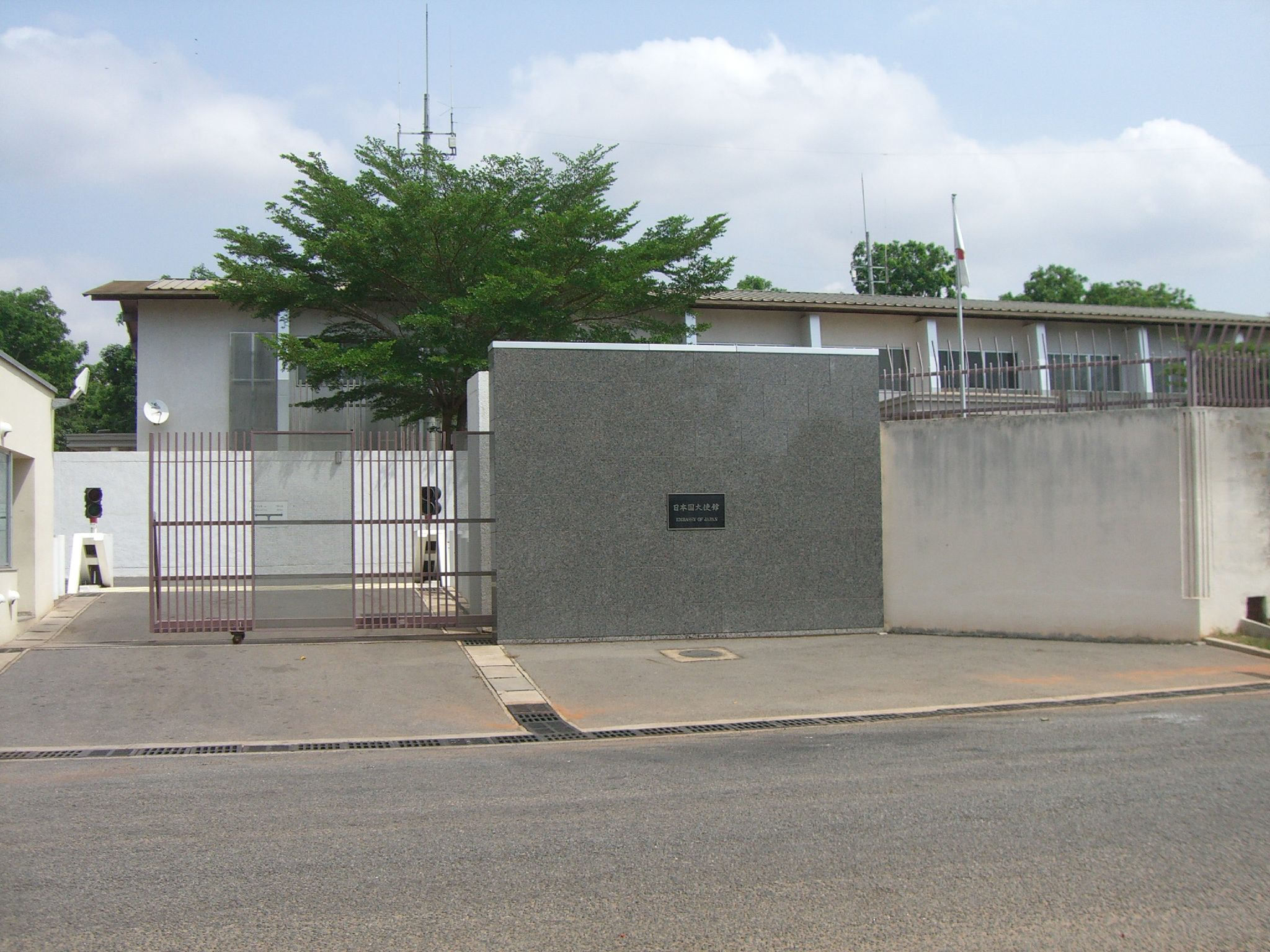
Embassy in Accra

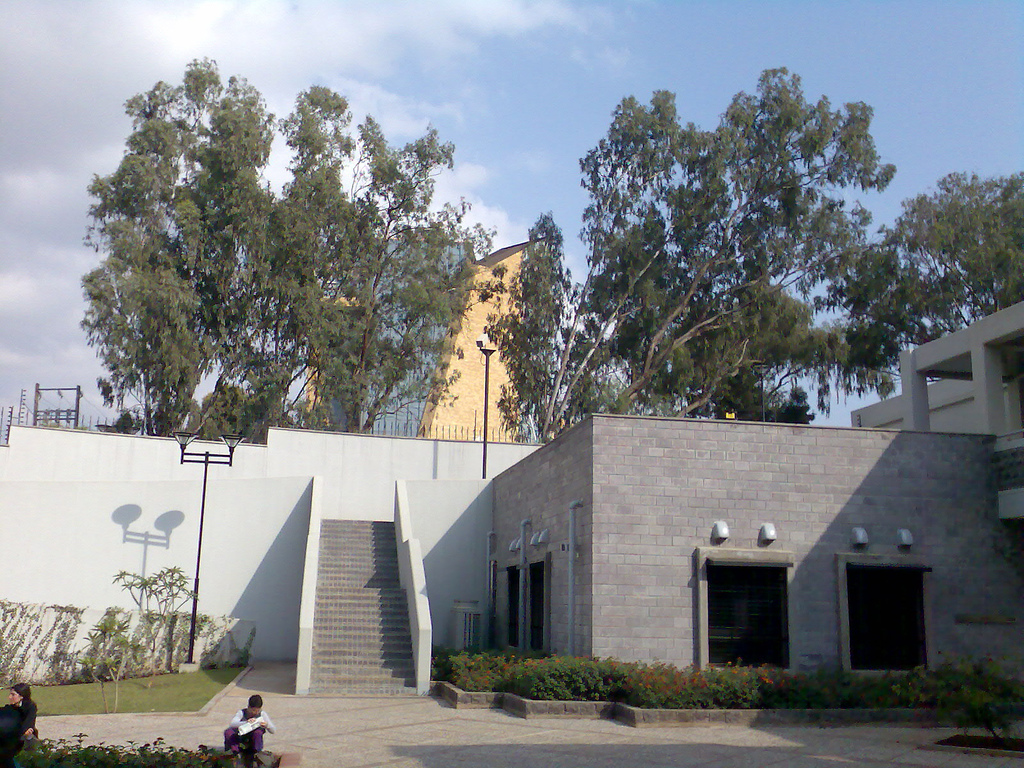
Embassy in Nairobi

=== Americas ===
Host country	Host city	Mission	Concurrent accreditation	Ref.
Argentina	Buenos Aires	Embassy		
Barbados	Bridgetown	Embassy	Countries: Antigua and Barbuda; Dominica; Saint Kitts and Nevis	
Belize	Belmopan	Embassy		
Bolivia	La Paz	Embassy		
Bolivia	Santa Cruz de la Sierra	Consular office		
Brazil	Brasília	Embassy		
Brazil	Curitiba	Consulate-General		
Brazil	Manaus	Consulate-General		
Brazil	Recife	Consulate-General		
Brazil	Rio de Janeiro	Consulate-General		
Brazil	São Paulo	Consulate-General		
Brazil	Belém	Consulate		
Brazil	Porto Alegre	Consular office		
Canada	Ottawa	Embassy		
Canada	Calgary	Consulate-General		
Canada	Montreal	Consulate-General		
Canada	Toronto	Consulate-General		
Canada	Vancouver	Consulate-General		
Chile	Santiago de Chile	Embassy		
Colombia	Bogotá	Embassy		
Costa Rica	San José	Embassy		
Cuba	Havana	Embassy		
Dominican Republic	Santo Domingo	Embassy		
Ecuador	Quito	Embassy		
El Salvador	San Salvador	Embassy		
Guatemala	Guatemala City	Embassy		
Haiti	Port-au-Prince	Embassy		
Honduras	Tegucigalpa	Embassy		
Jamaica	Kingston	Embassy	Countries: Bahamas; International Organizations: International Seabed Authority	
Mexico	Mexico City	Embassy		
Mexico	León	Consulate-General		
Nicaragua	Managua	Embassy		
Panama	Panama City	Embassy		
Paraguay	Asunción	Embassy		
Paraguay	Encarnación	Consular office		
Peru	Lima	Embassy		
Trinidad and Tobago	Port of Spain	Embassy	Countries: Grenada; Guyana; Saint Lucia; Saint Vincent and the Grenadines; Suriname; International Organizations: Caribbean Community	
United States	Washington, D.C.	Embassy	International Organizations: Organization of American States	
United States	Atlanta (Georgia)	Consulate-General	International Organizations: Organization of American States	
United States	Boston (Massachusetts)	Consulate-General	International Organizations: Organization of American States	
United States	Chicago (Illinois)	Consulate-General	International Organizations: Organization of American States	
United States	Denver (Colorado)	Consulate-General	International Organizations: Organization of American States	
United States	Detroit (Michigan)	Consulate-General	International Organizations: Organization of American States	
United States	Hagåtña (Guam)	Consulate-General	International Organizations: Organization of American States	
United States	Honolulu (Hawaii)	Consulate-General	International Organizations: Organization of American States	
United States	Houston (Texas)	Consulate-General	International Organizations: Organization of American States	
United States	Los Angeles (California)	Consulate-General	International Organizations: Organization of American States	
United States	Miami (Florida)	Consulate-General	International Organizations: Organization of American States	
United States	Nashville (Tennessee)	Consulate-General	International Organizations: Organization of American States	
United States	New York City (New York)	Consulate-General	International Organizations: Organization of American States	
United States	San Francisco (California)	Consulate-General	International Organizations: Organization of American States	
United States	Seattle (Washington)	Consulate-General	International Organizations: Organization of American States	
United States	Anchorage (Alaska)	Consular office	International Organizations: Organization of American States	
United States	Portland (Oregon)	Consular office	International Organizations: Organization of American States	
United States	Saipan (Northern Mariana Islands)	Consular office	International Organizations: Organization of American States	
Uruguay	Montevideo	Embassy		
Venezuela	Caracas	Embassy		

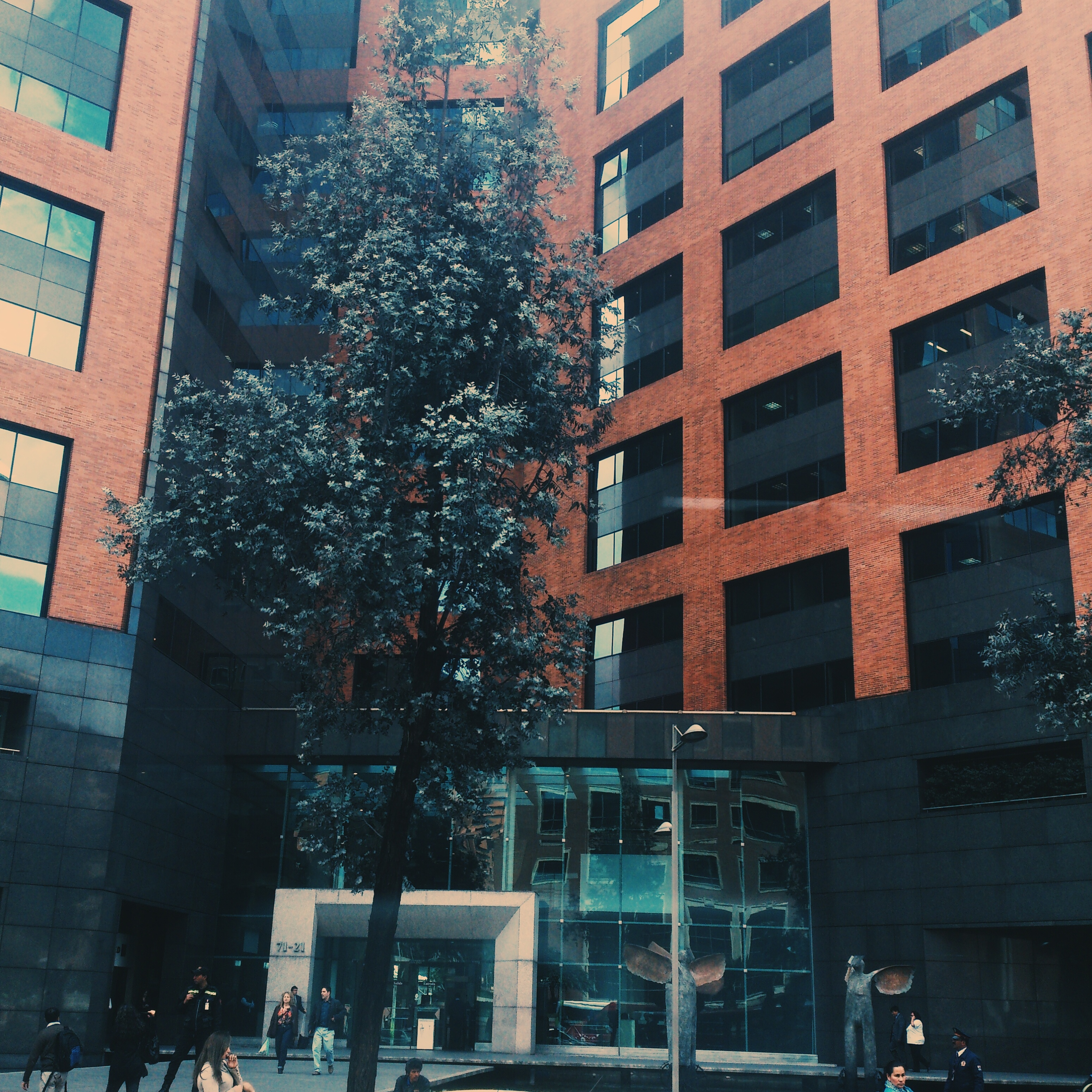
Building hosting the embassy in Bogotá

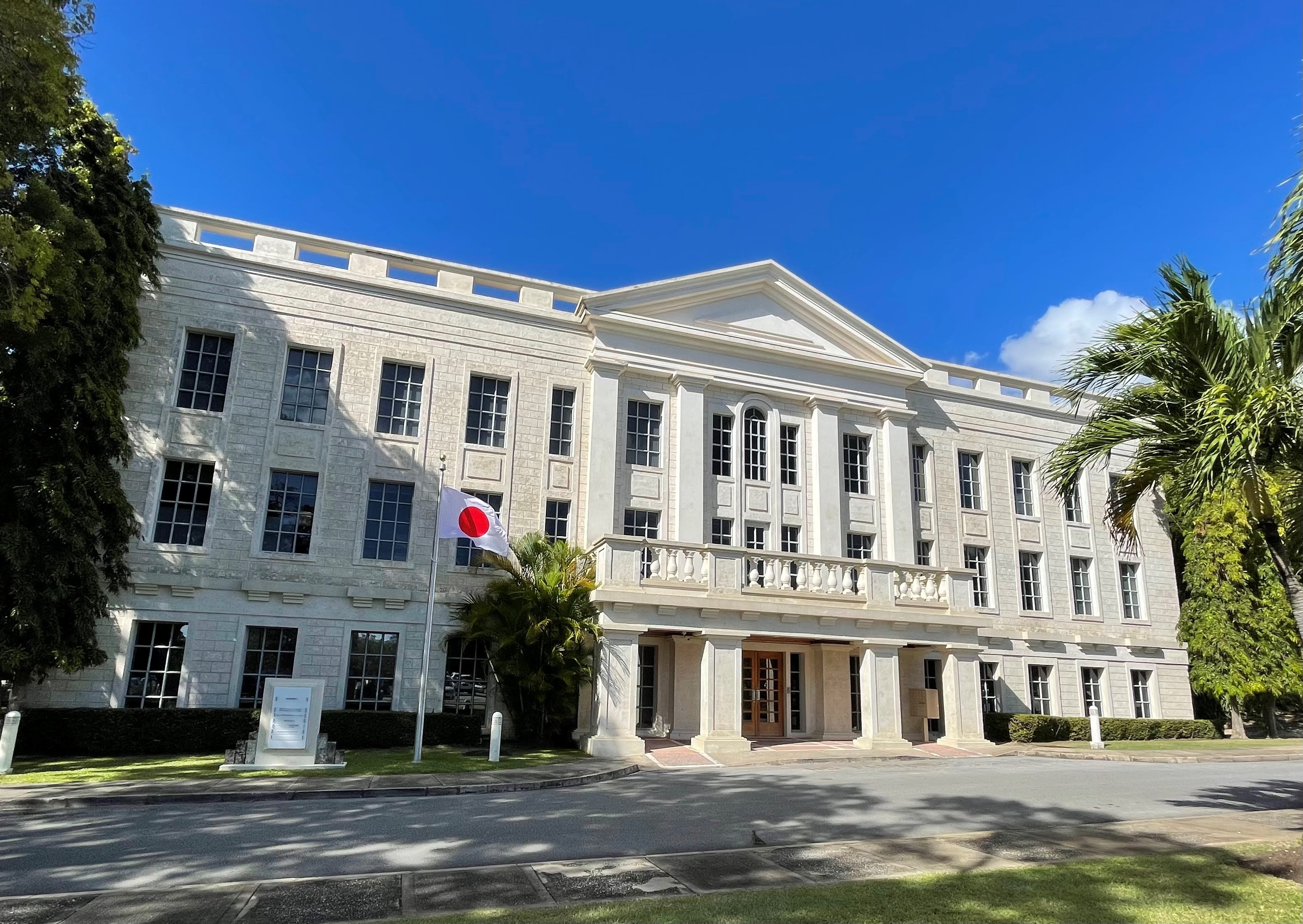
Embassy in Bridgetown

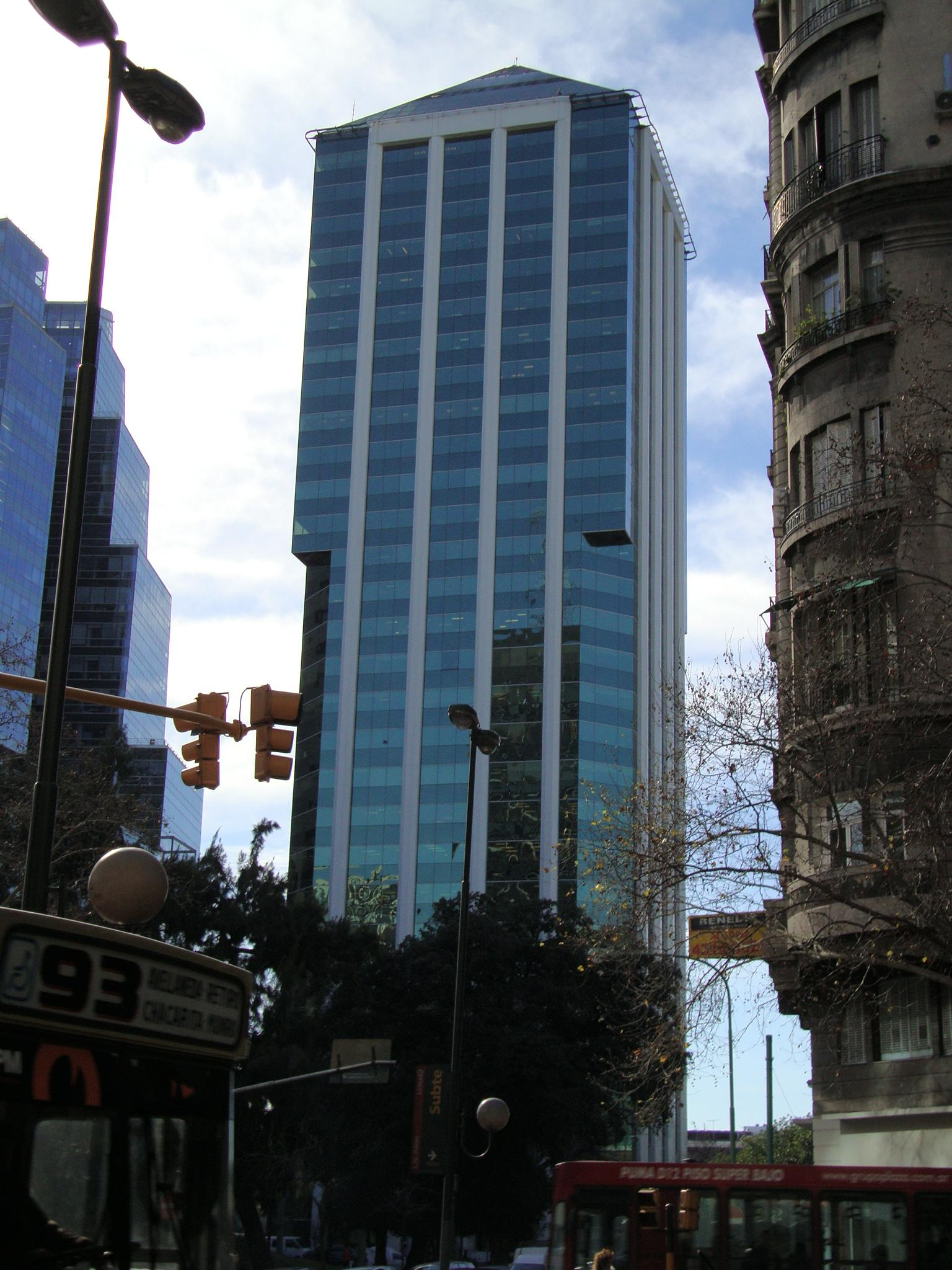
Building hosting the embassy in Buenos Aires

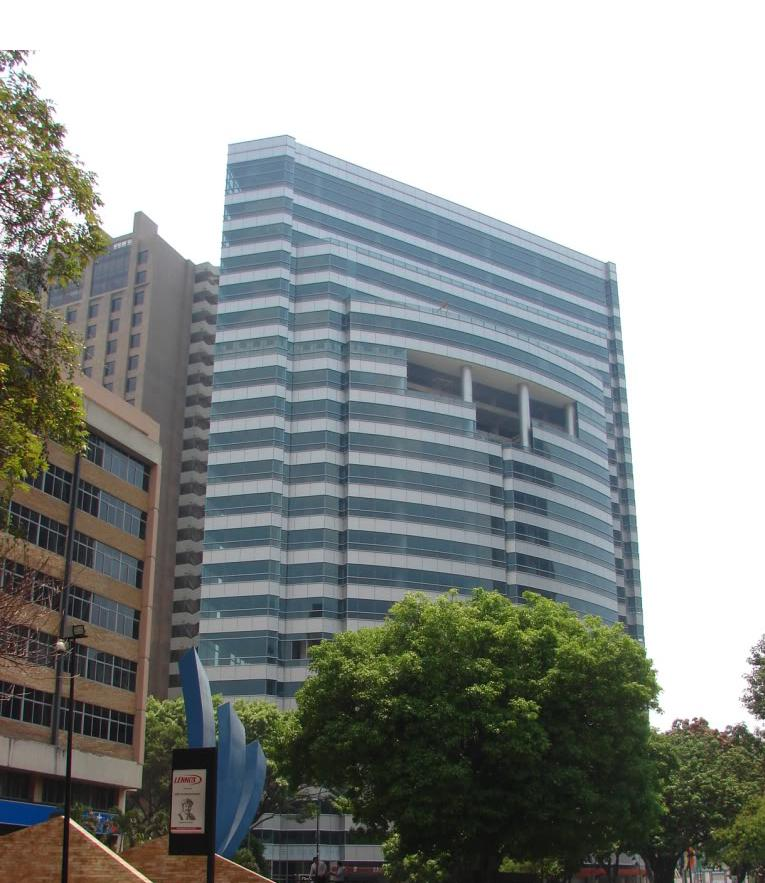
Building hosting the embassy in Caracas

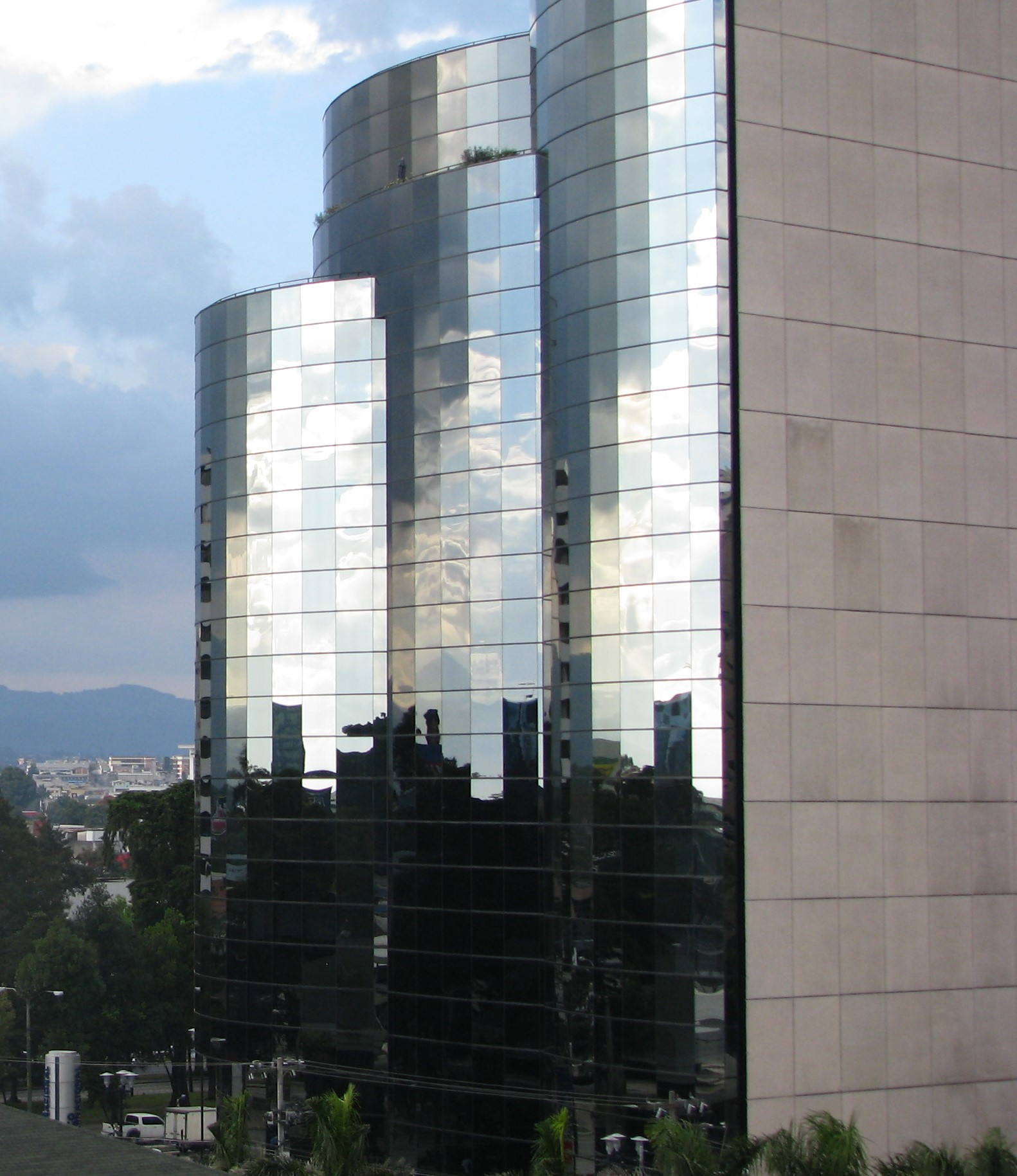
Building hosting the Embassy in Guatemala City

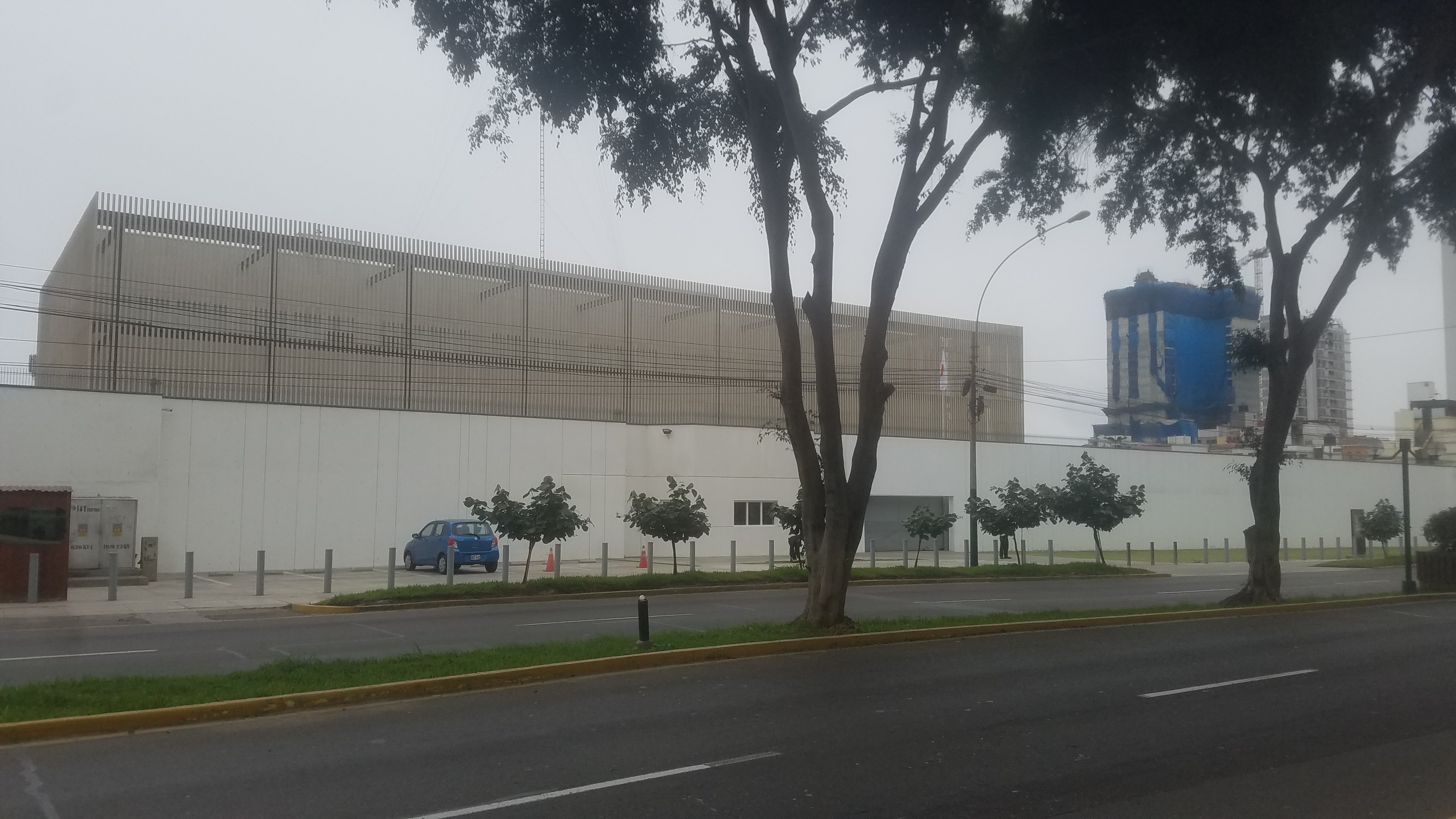
Emsbassy in Lima

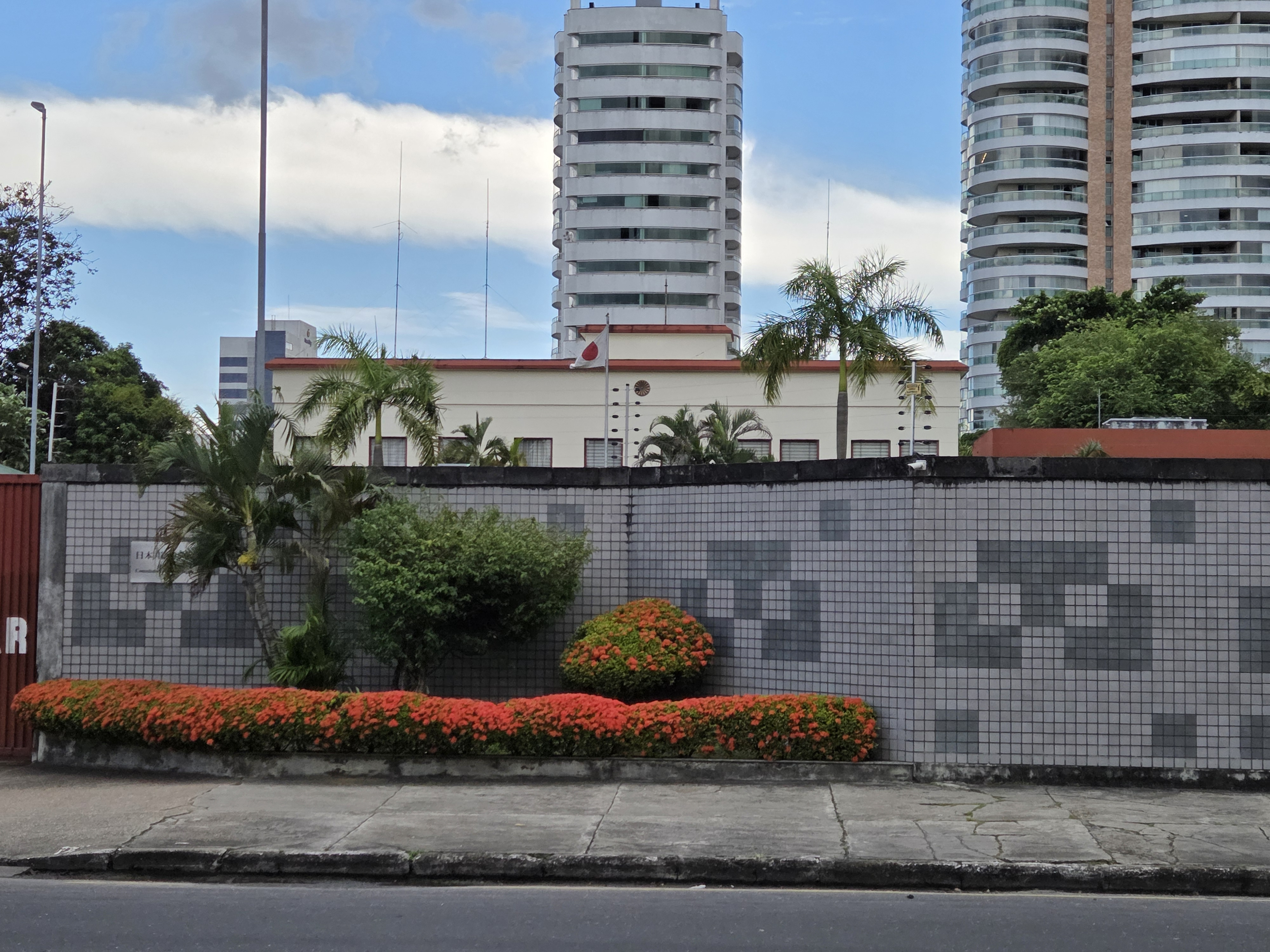
Consulate-General in Manaus

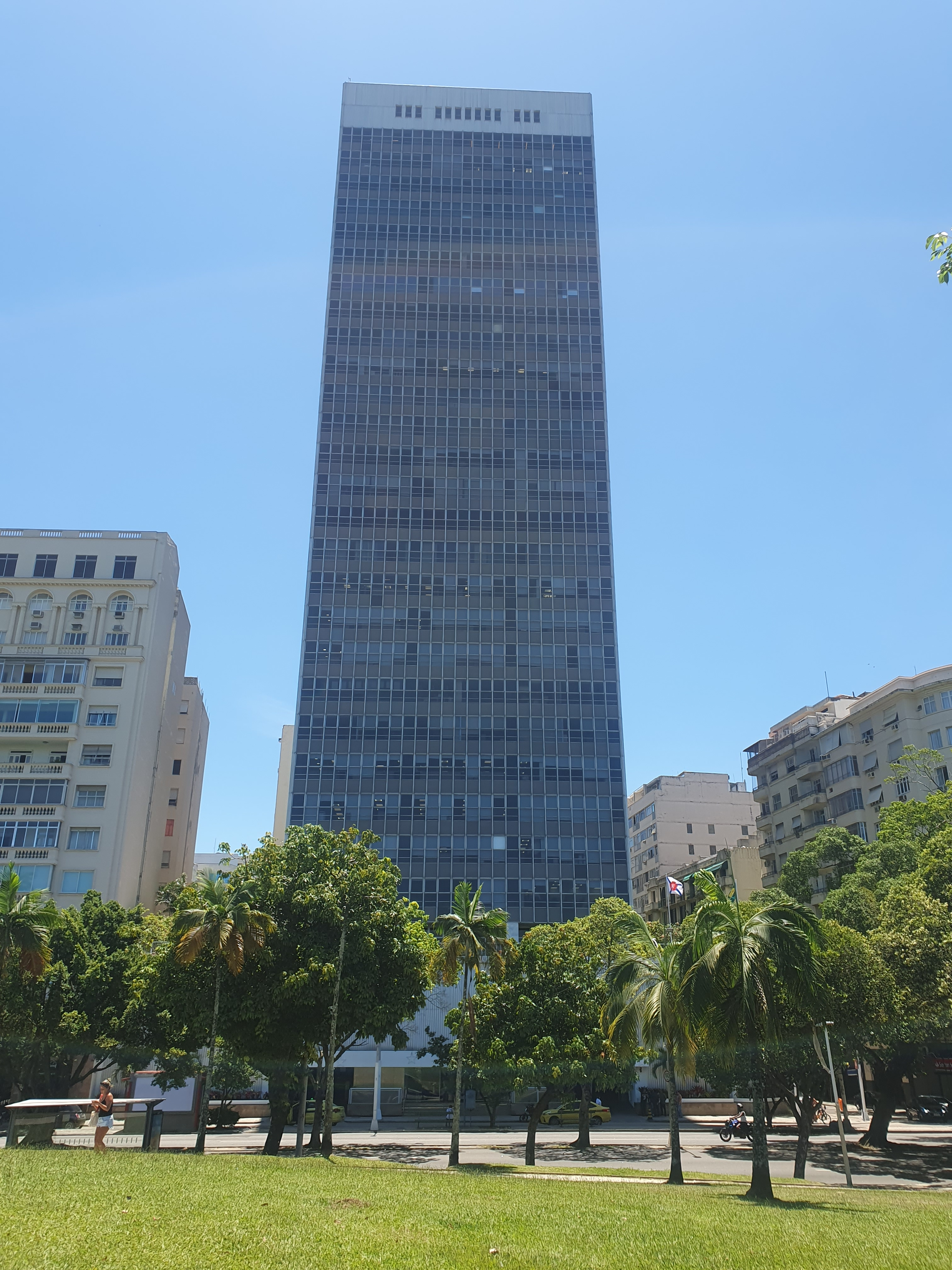
Building hosting the Consulate-General in Rio de Janeiro

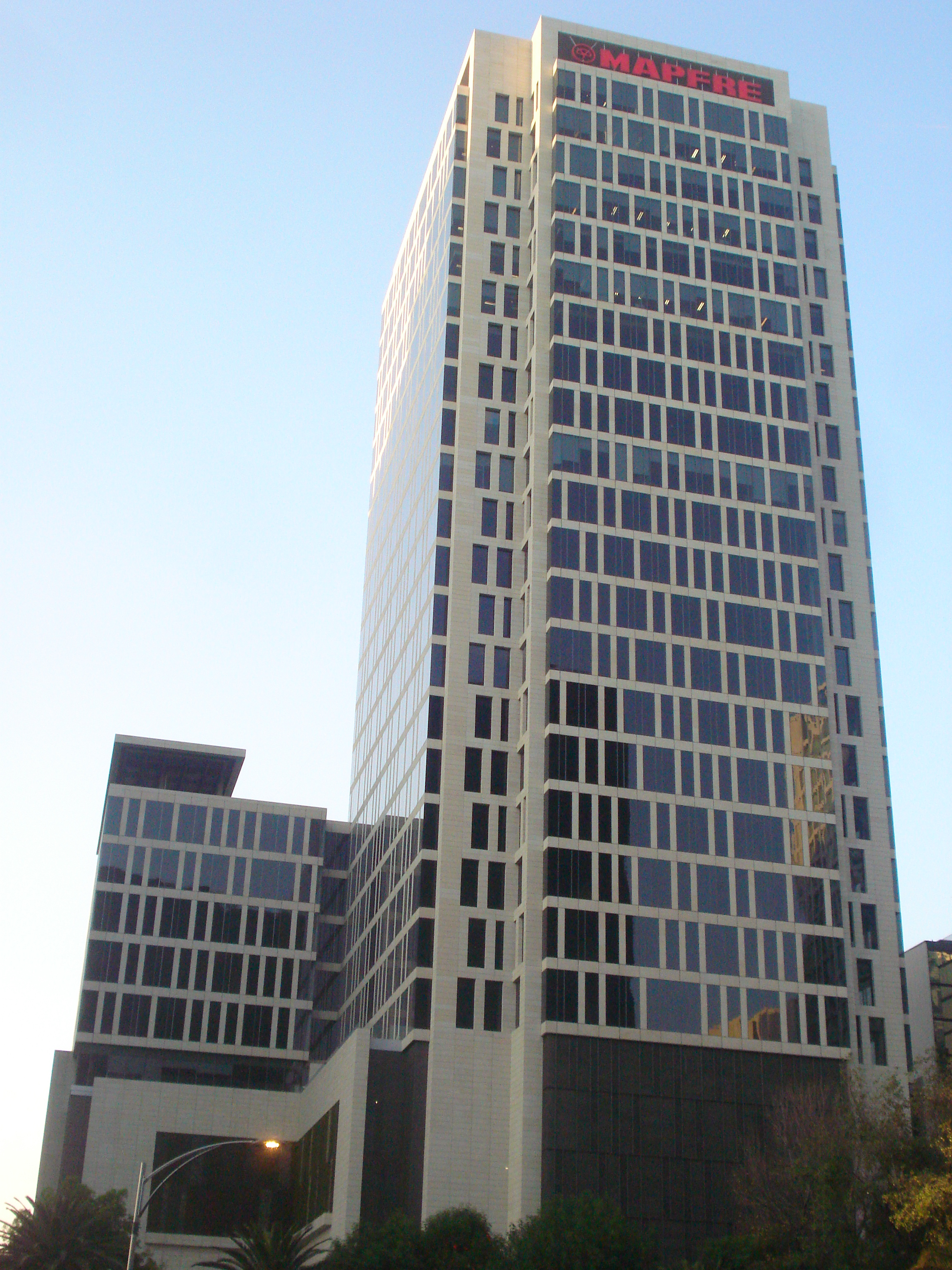
Building hosting the embassy in Mexico City

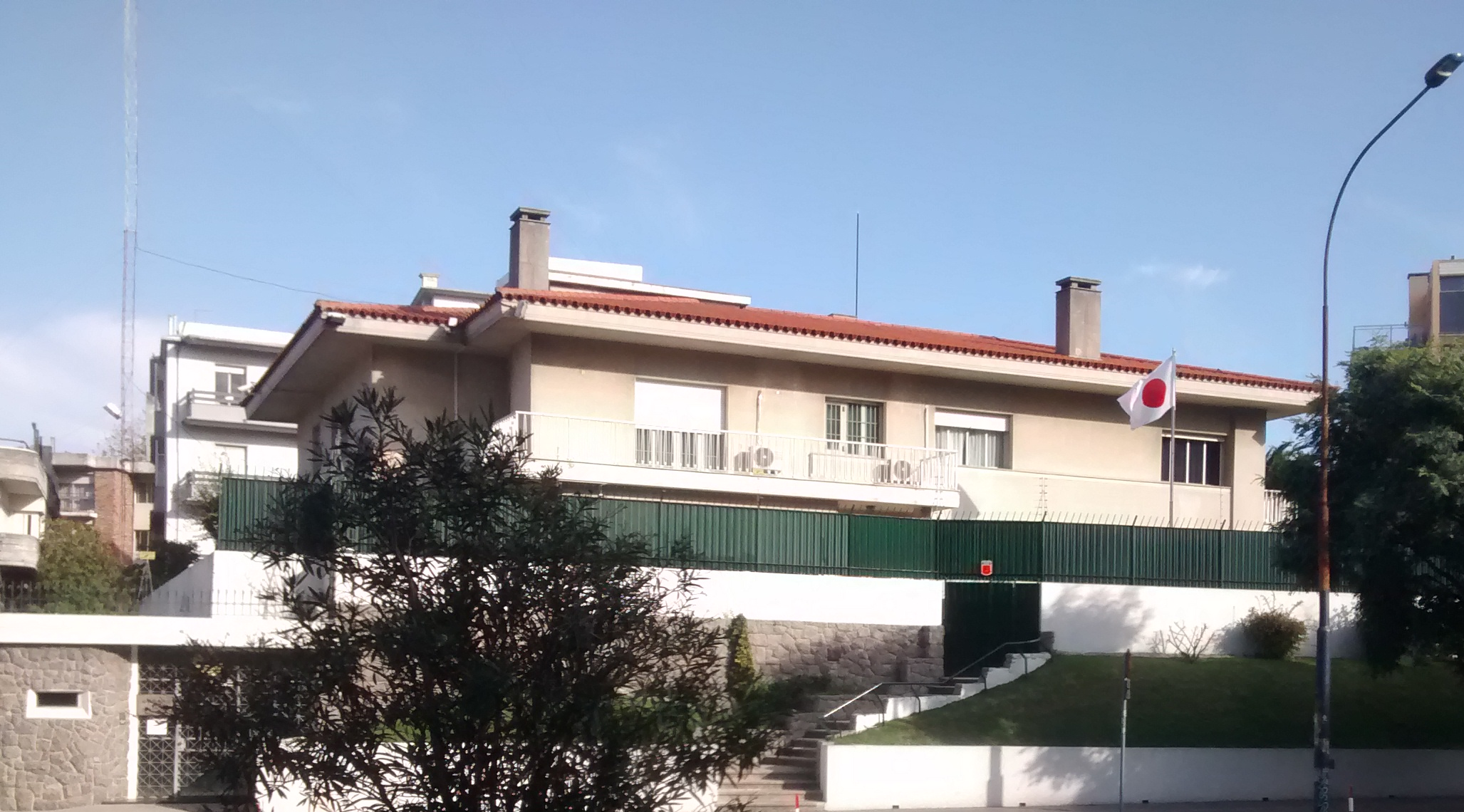
Embassy in Montevideo

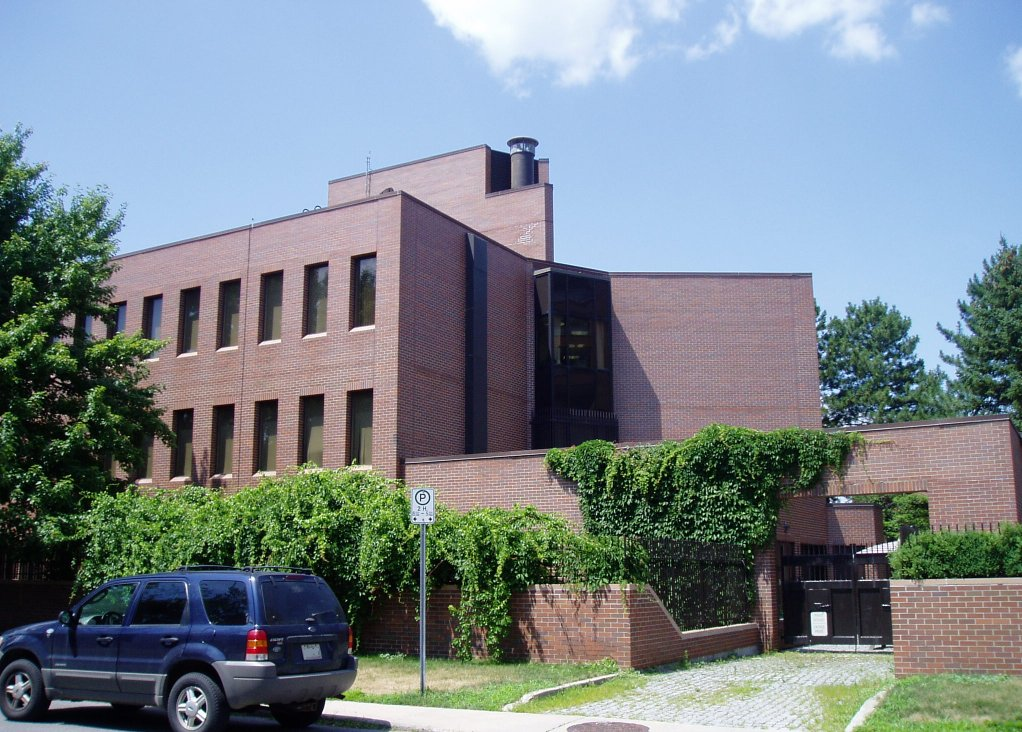
Embassy in Ottawa

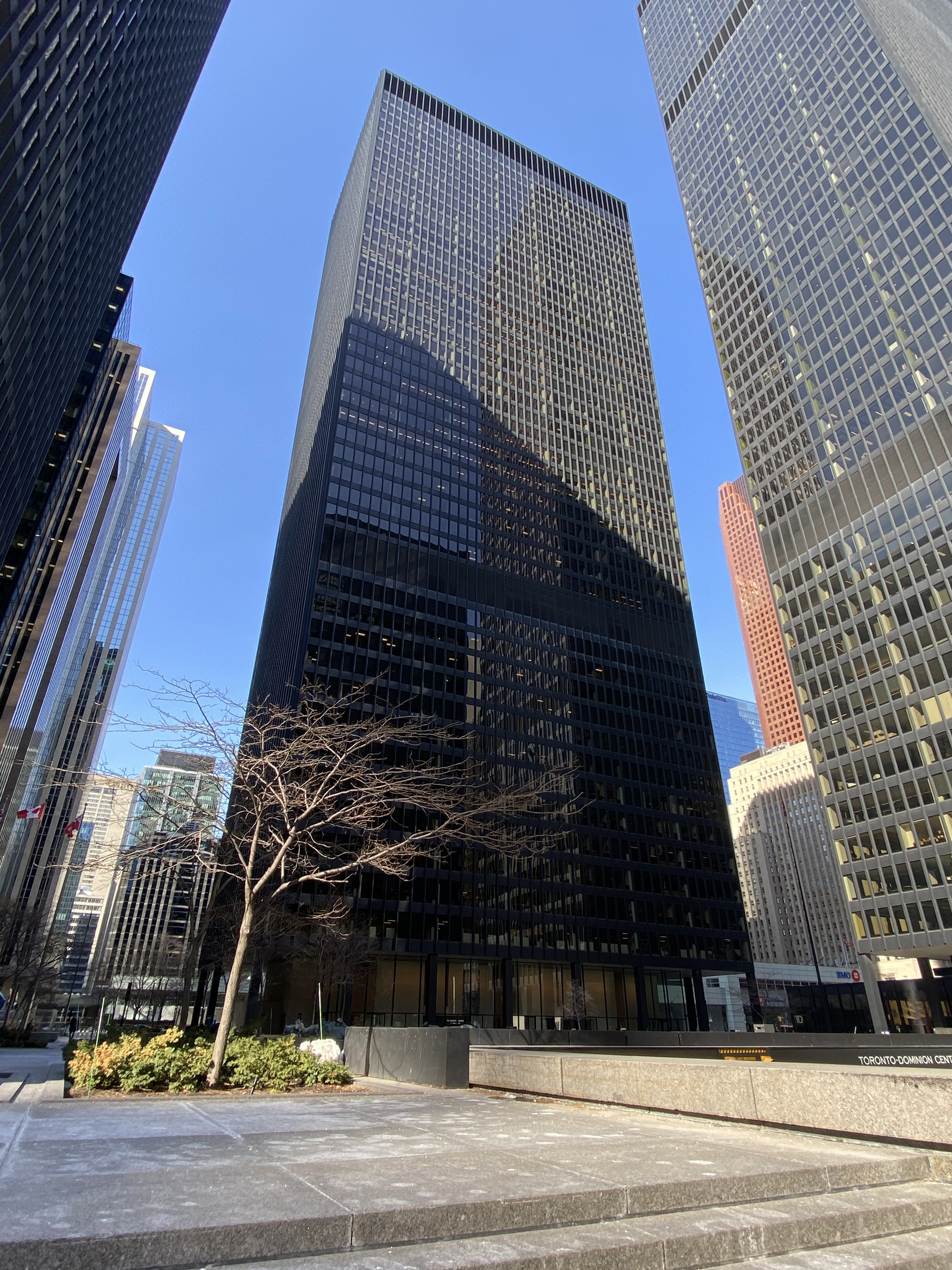
Building hosting the consulate-general in Toronto

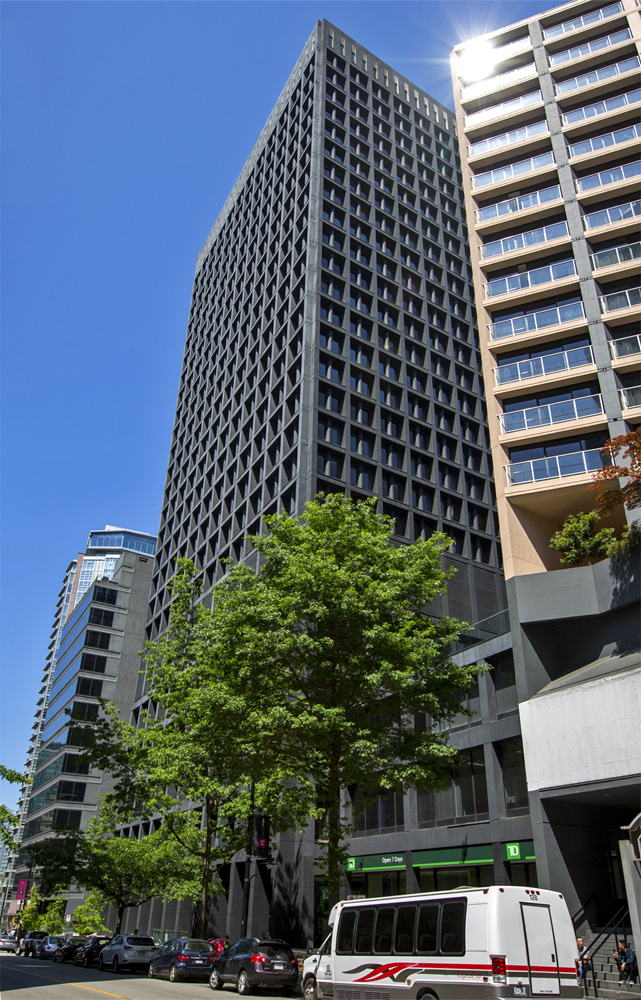
Building hosting the consulate-general in Vancouver

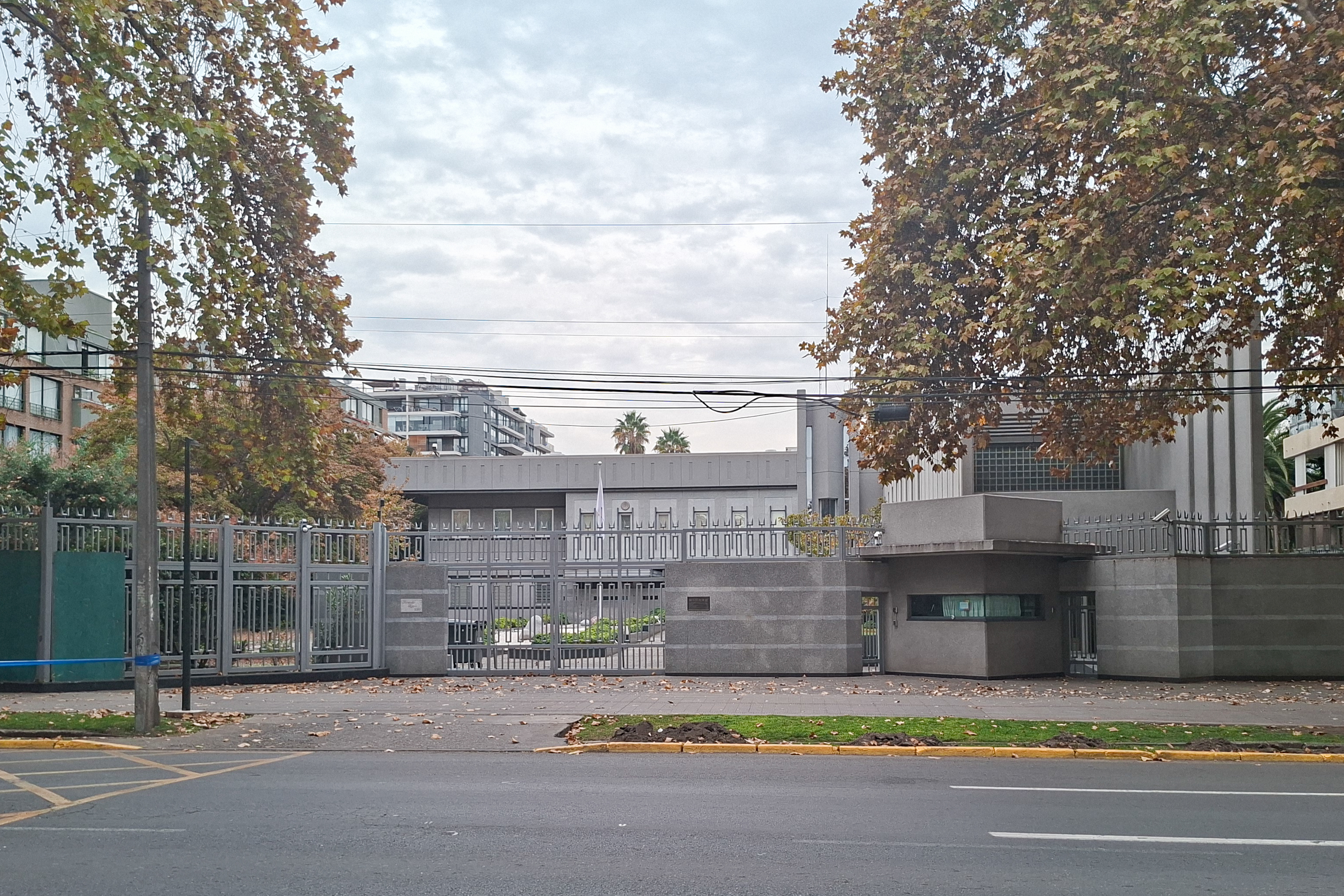
Embassy in Santiago de Chile

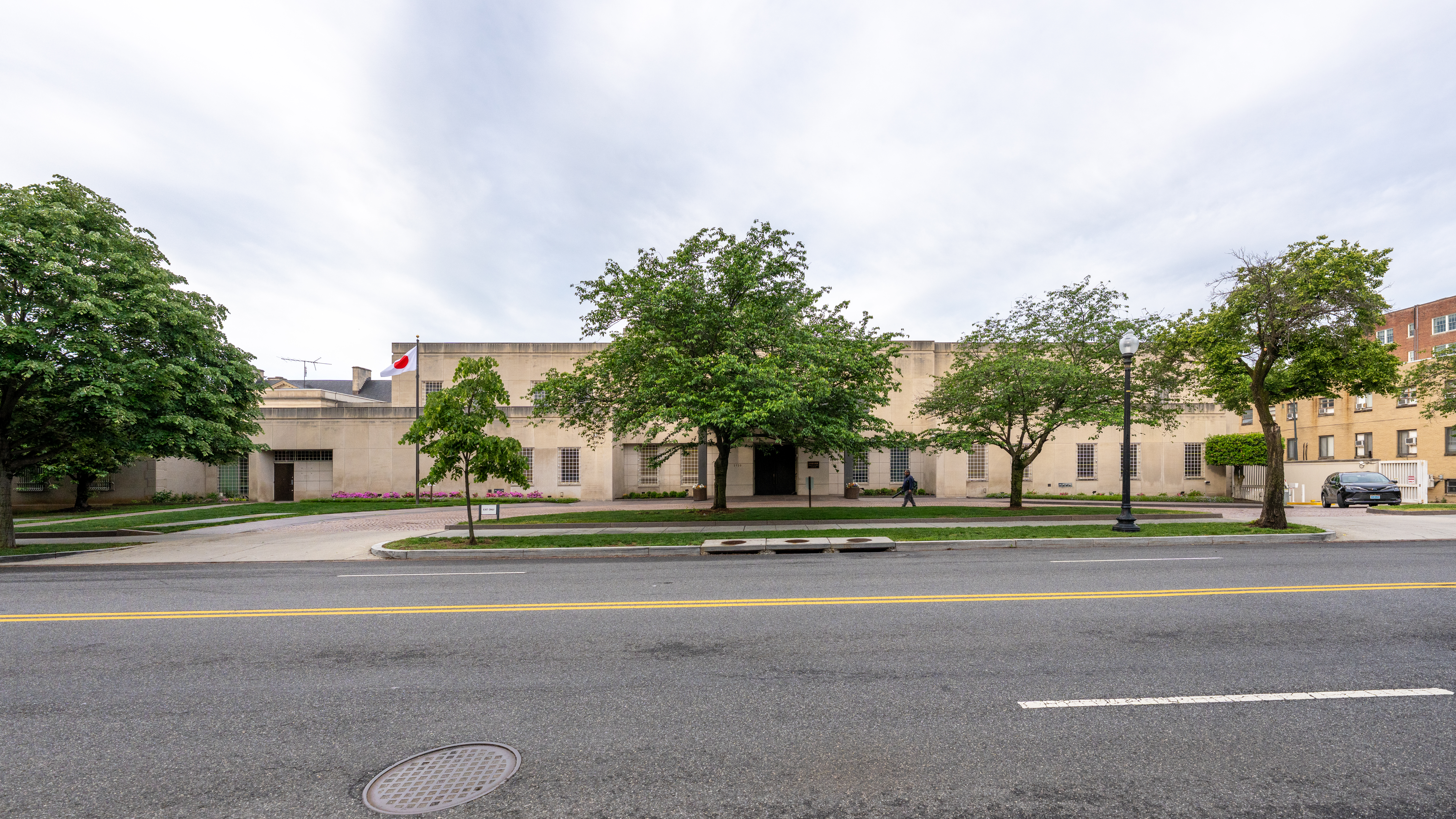
Embassy in Washington, D.C.

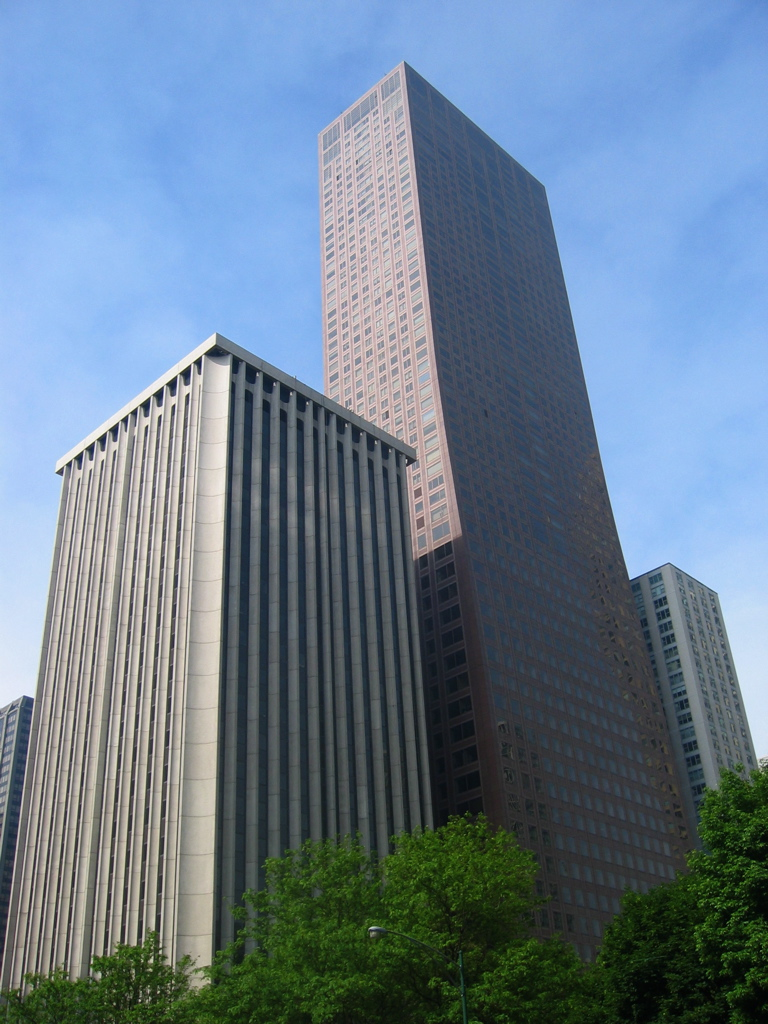
Building hosting the consulate-general in Chicago

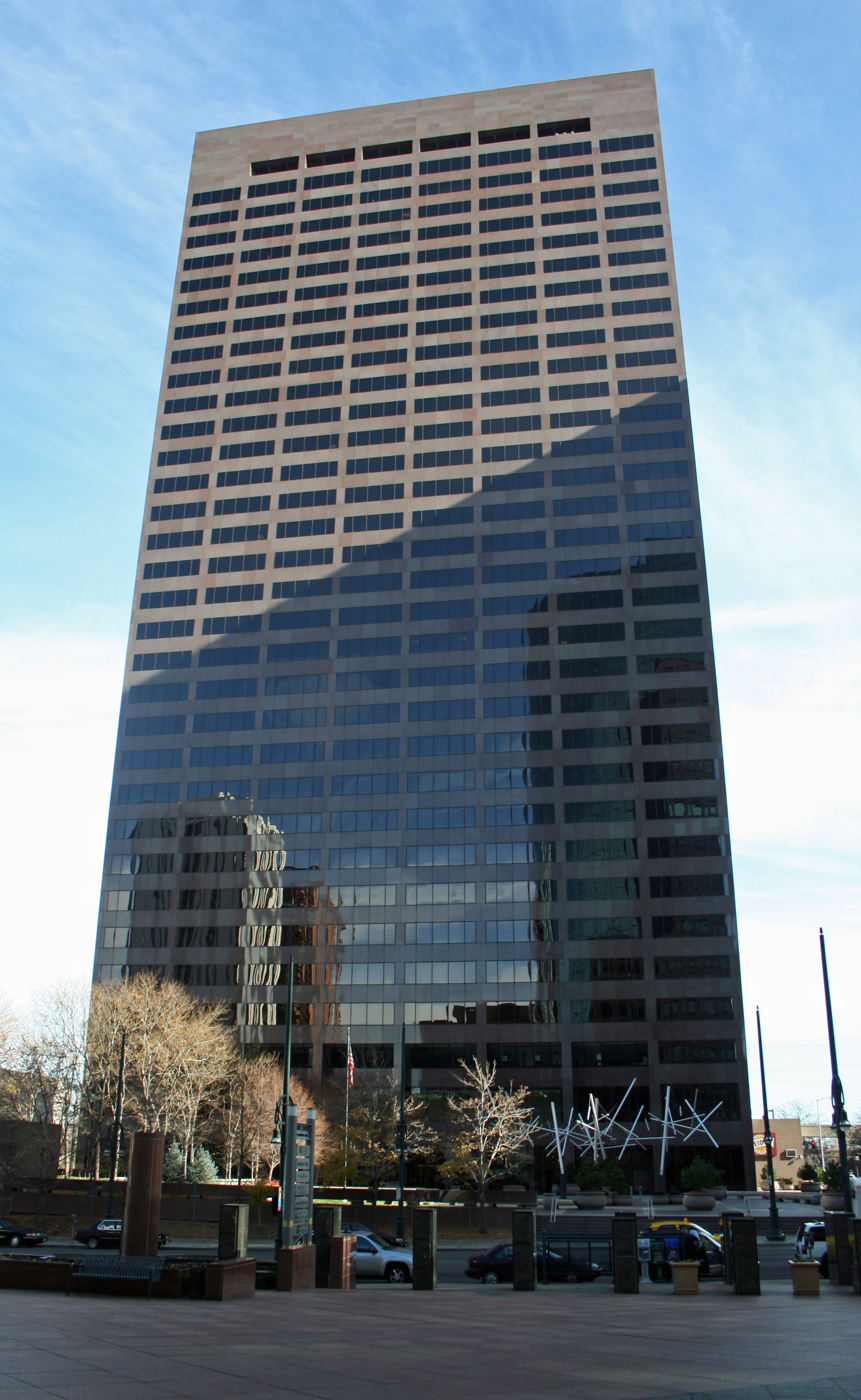
Building hosting the consulate-general in Denver

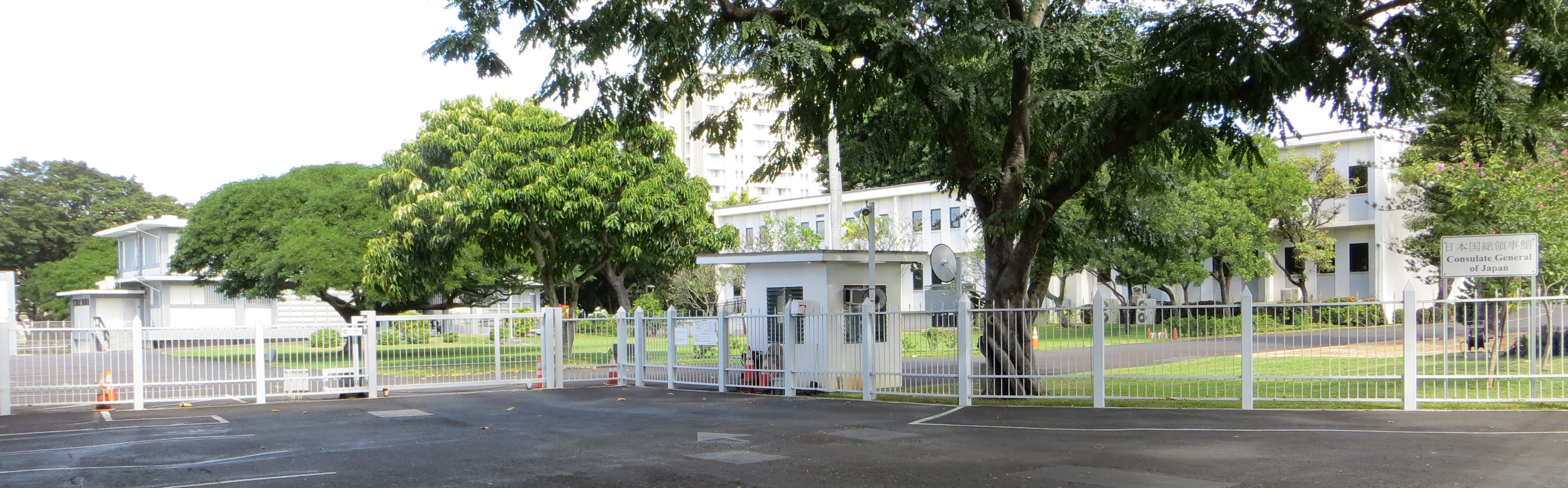
Consulate-General in Honolulu

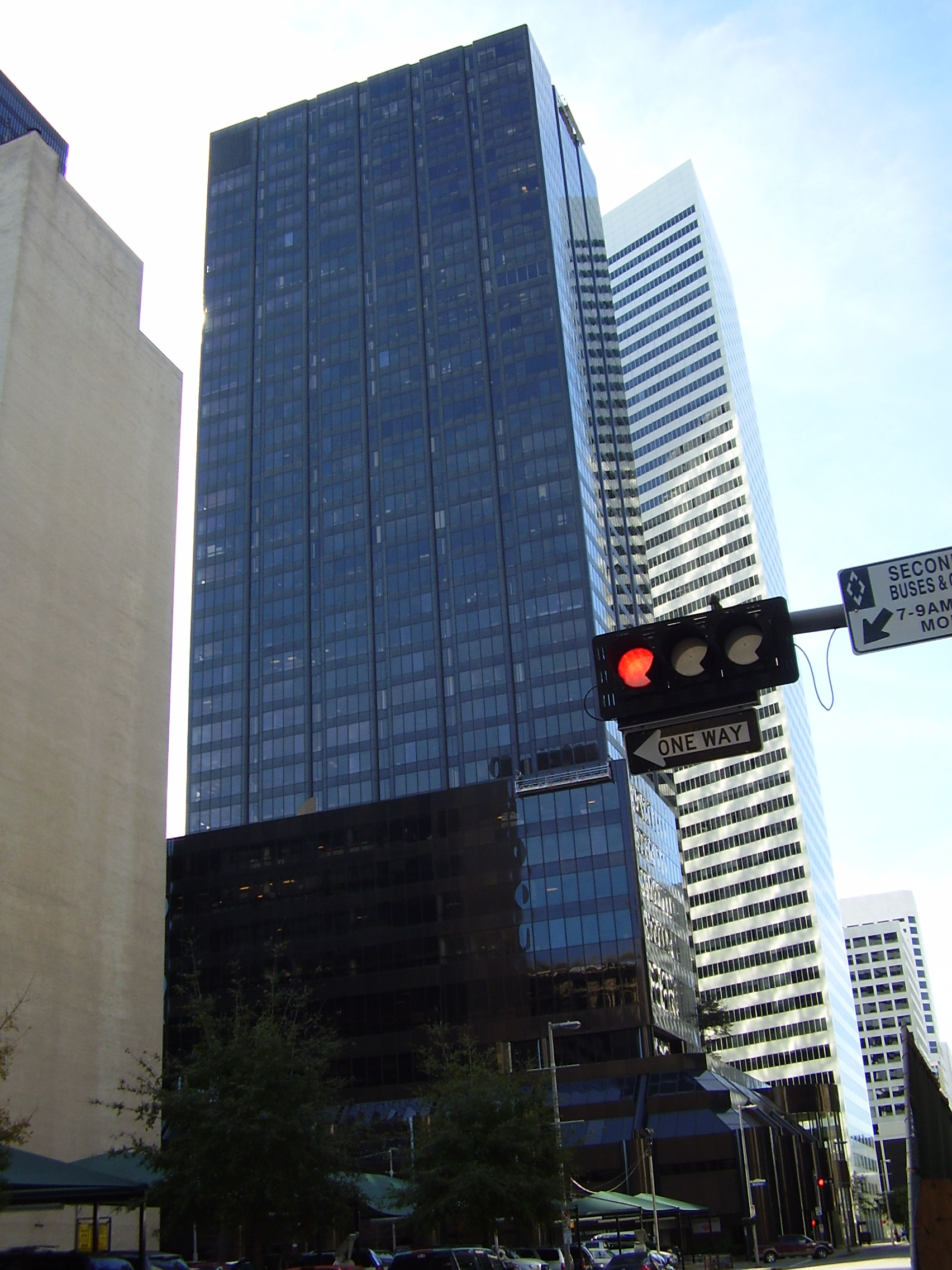
Building hosting the Consulate-General in Houston

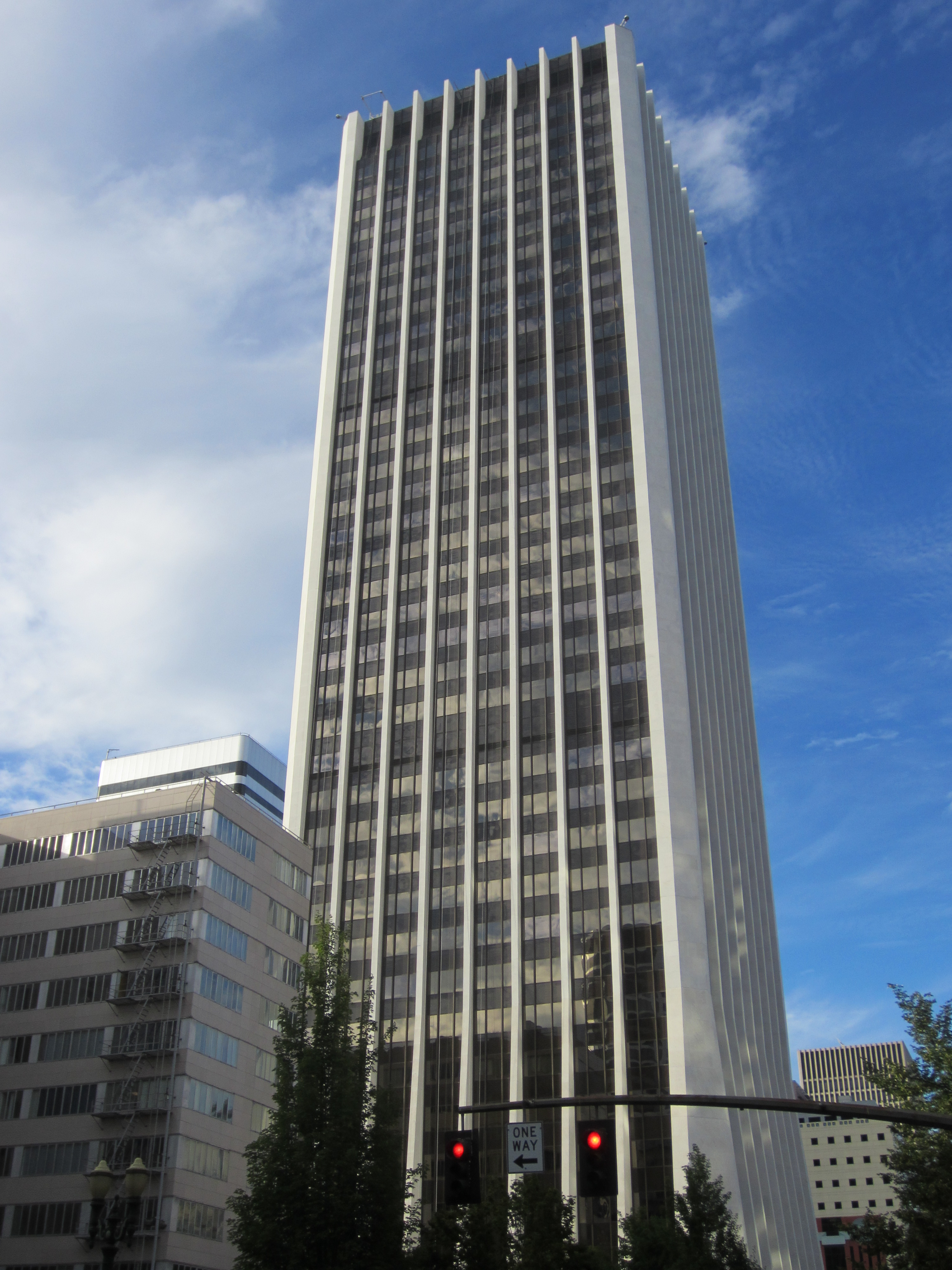
Building hosting the consular office in Portland

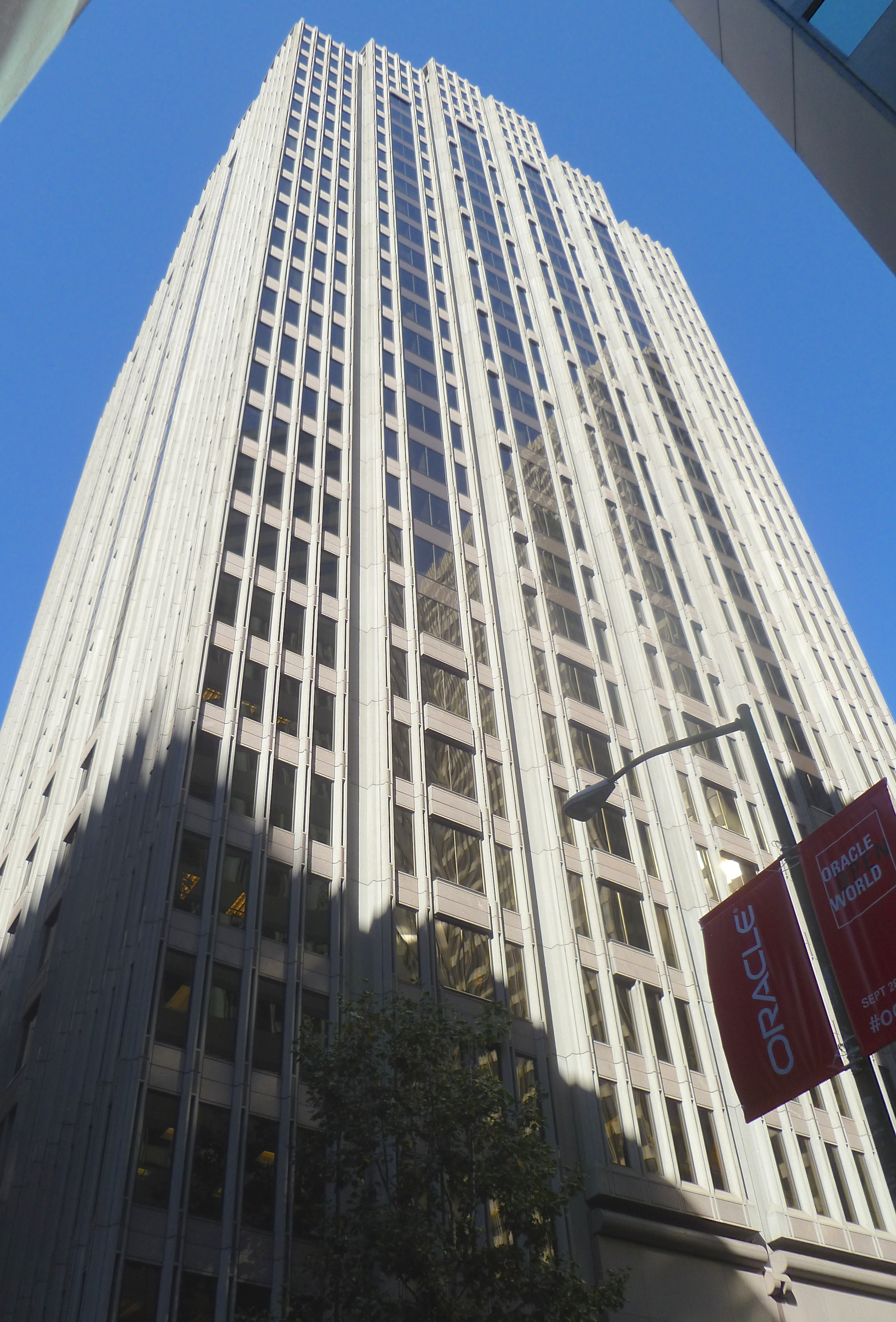
Building hosting the consulate-general in San Francisco

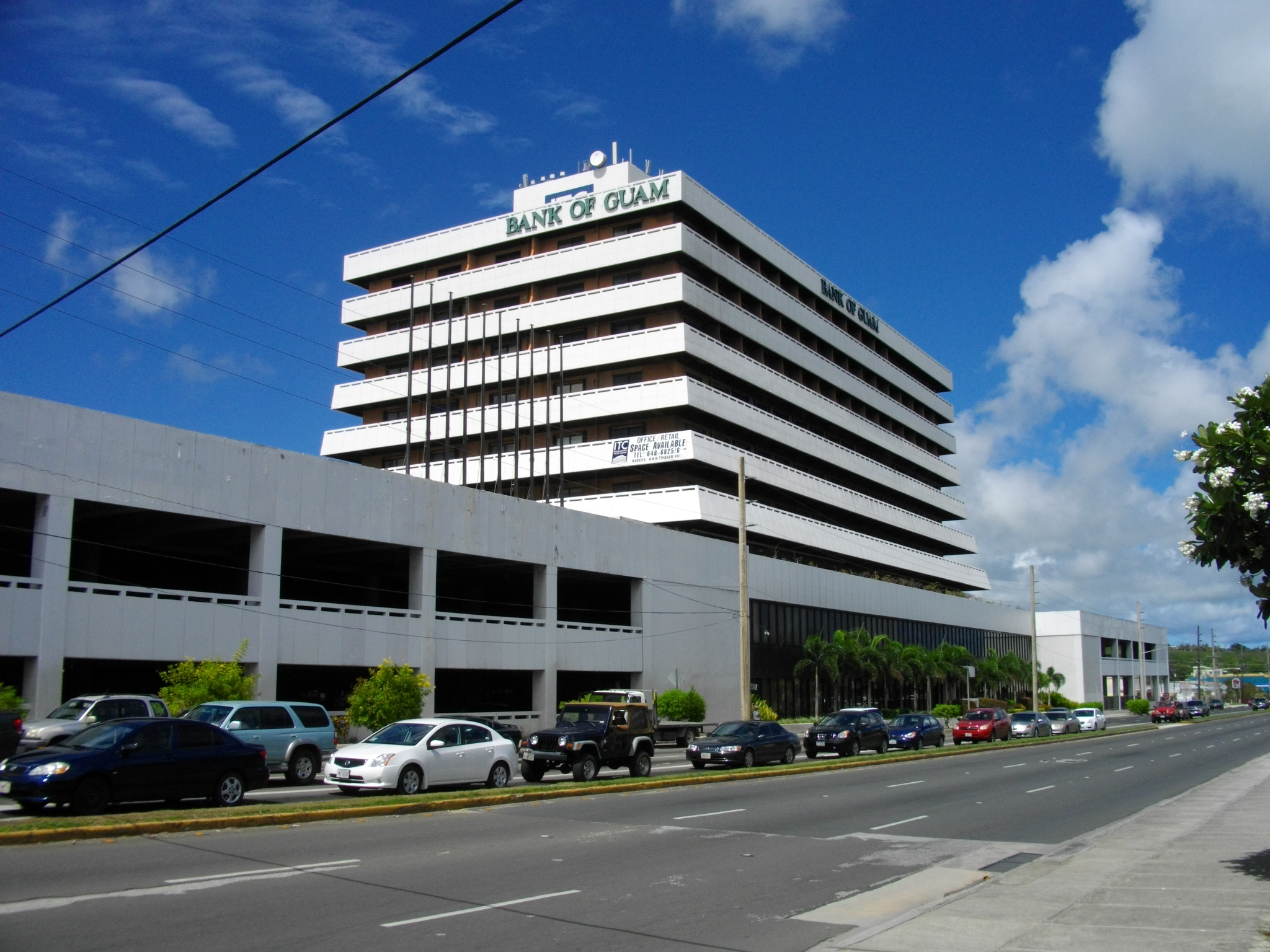
Building hosting the consular office in Tamuning

=== Asia ===
Host country	Host city	Mission	Concurrent accreditation	Ref.
Afghanistan	Kabul	Embassy		
Armenia	Yerevan	Embassy		
Azerbaijan	Baku	Embassy		
Bahrain	Manama	Embassy		
Bangladesh	Dhaka	Embassy		
Brunei	Bandar Seri Begawan	Embassy		
Cambodia	Phnom Penh	Embassy		
Cambodia	Siem Reap	Consular office		
China	Beijing	Embassy		
China	Chongqing	Consulate-General		
China	Guangzhou	Consulate-General		
China	Hong Kong	Consulate-General		
China	Qingdao	Consulate-General		
China	Shanghai	Consulate-General		
China	Shenyang	Consulate-General		
China	Dalian	Consular office		
Georgia	Tbilisi	Embassy		
India	New Delhi	Embassy	Countries: Bhutan	
India	Bengaluru	Consulate-General	Countries: Bhutan	
India	Chennai	Consulate-General	Countries: Bhutan	
India	Kolkata	Consulate-General	Countries: Bhutan	
India	Mumbai	Consulate-General	Countries: Bhutan	
Indonesia	Jakarta	Embassy		
Indonesia	Denpasar	Consulate-General		
Indonesia	Medan	Consulate-General		
Indonesia	Surabaya	Consulate-General		
Indonesia	Makassar	Consular office		
Iran	Tehran	Embassy		
Iraq	Baghdad	Embassy		
Iraq	Erbil	Consular office		
Israel	Tel Aviv	Embassy		
Jordan	Amman	Embassy		
Kazakhstan	Astana	Embassy		
Kuwait	Kuwait City	Embassy		
Kyrgyzstan	Bishkek	Embassy		
Laos	Vientiane	Embassy		
Lebanon	Beirut	Embassy		
Malaysia	Kuala Lumpur	Embassy		
Malaysia	George Town	Consulate-General		
Malaysia	Kota Kinabalu	Consular office		
Maldives	Malé	Embassy		
Mongolia	Ulaanbaatar	Embassy		
Myanmar	Yangon	Embassy		
Nepal	Kathmandu	Embassy		
Oman	Muscat	Embassy		
Pakistan	Islamabad	Embassy		
Pakistan	Karachi	Consulate-General		
Palestine	Ramallah	Representative office		
Philippines	Manila	Embassy		
Philippines	Cebu City	Consulate-General		
Philippines	Davao City	Consulate-General		
Qatar	Doha	Embassy		
Republic of China (Taiwan)	Taipei	Exchange Association office		
Republic of China (Taiwan)	Kaohsiung	Exchange Association office		
Saudi Arabia	Riyadh	Embassy	Countries: Yemen	
Saudi Arabia	Jeddah	Consulate-General	Countries: Yemen	
Singapore	Singapore	Embassy		
South Korea	Seoul	Embassy		
South Korea	Busan	Consulate-General		
South Korea	Jeju City	Consulate-General		
Sri Lanka	Colombo	Embassy		
Syria	Damascus	Embassy		
Tajikistan	Dushanbe	Embassy		
Thailand	Bangkok	Embassy		
Thailand	Chiang Mai	Consulate-General		
Timor-Leste	Dili	Embassy		
Turkey	Ankara	Embassy		
Turkey	Istanbul	Consulate-General		
Turkmenistan	Ashgabat	Embassy		
United Arab Emirates	Abu Dhabi	Embassy		
United Arab Emirates	Dubai	Consulate-General		
Uzbekistan	Tashkent	Embassy		
Vietnam	Hanoi	Embassy		
Vietnam	Da Nang	Consulate-General		
Vietnam	Ho Chi Minh City	Consulate-General		

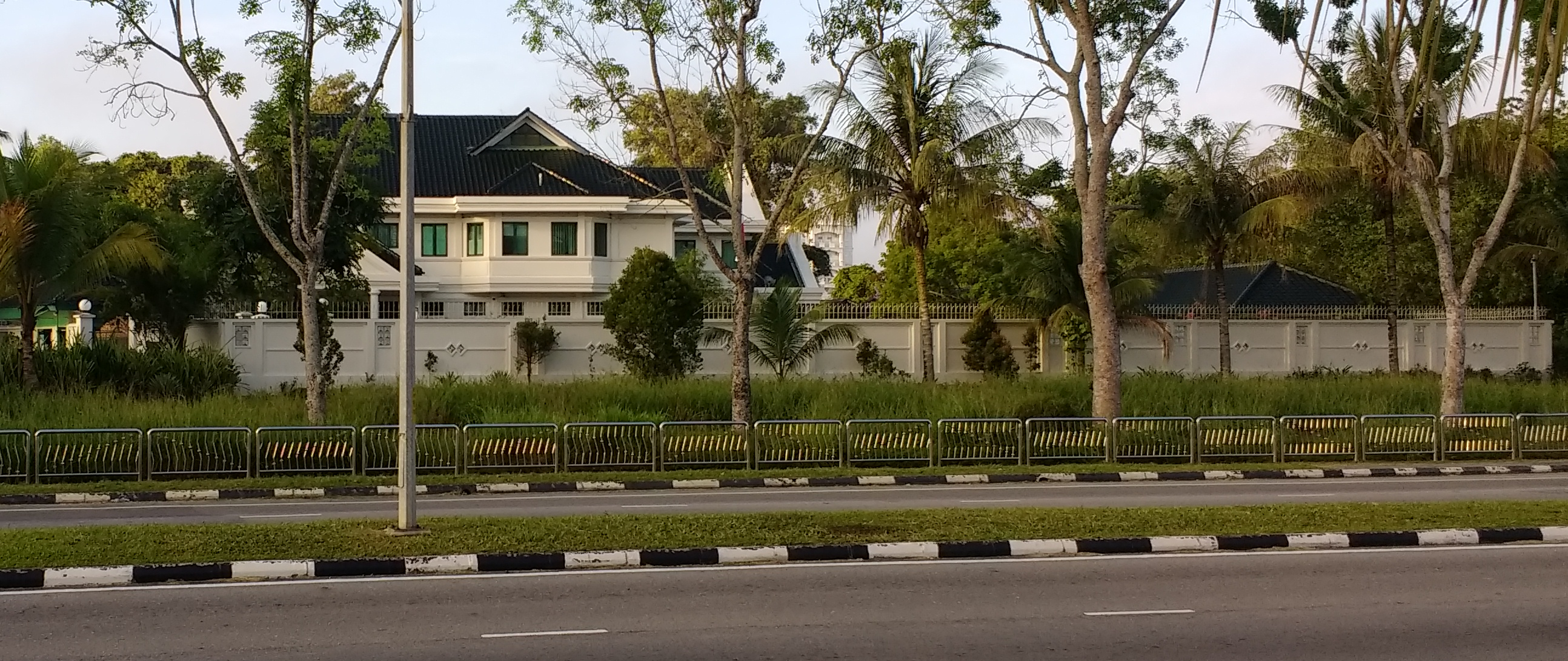
Embassy in Bandar Seri Begawan

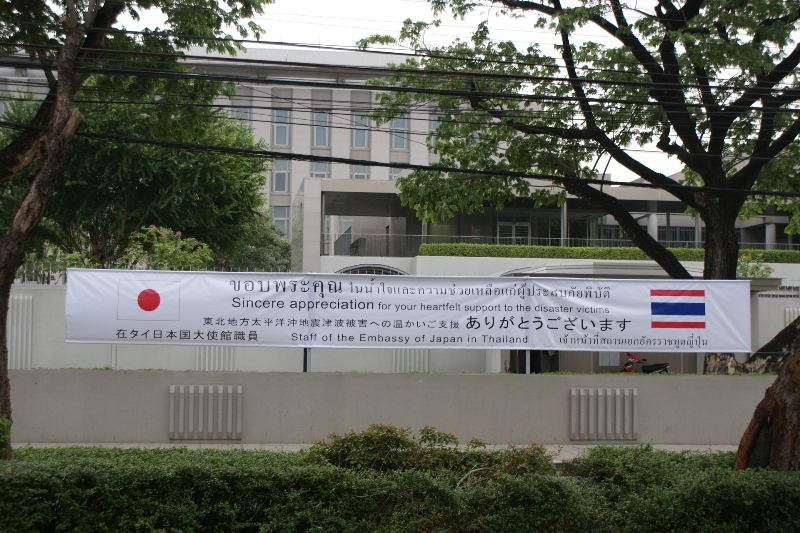
Embassy in Bangkok

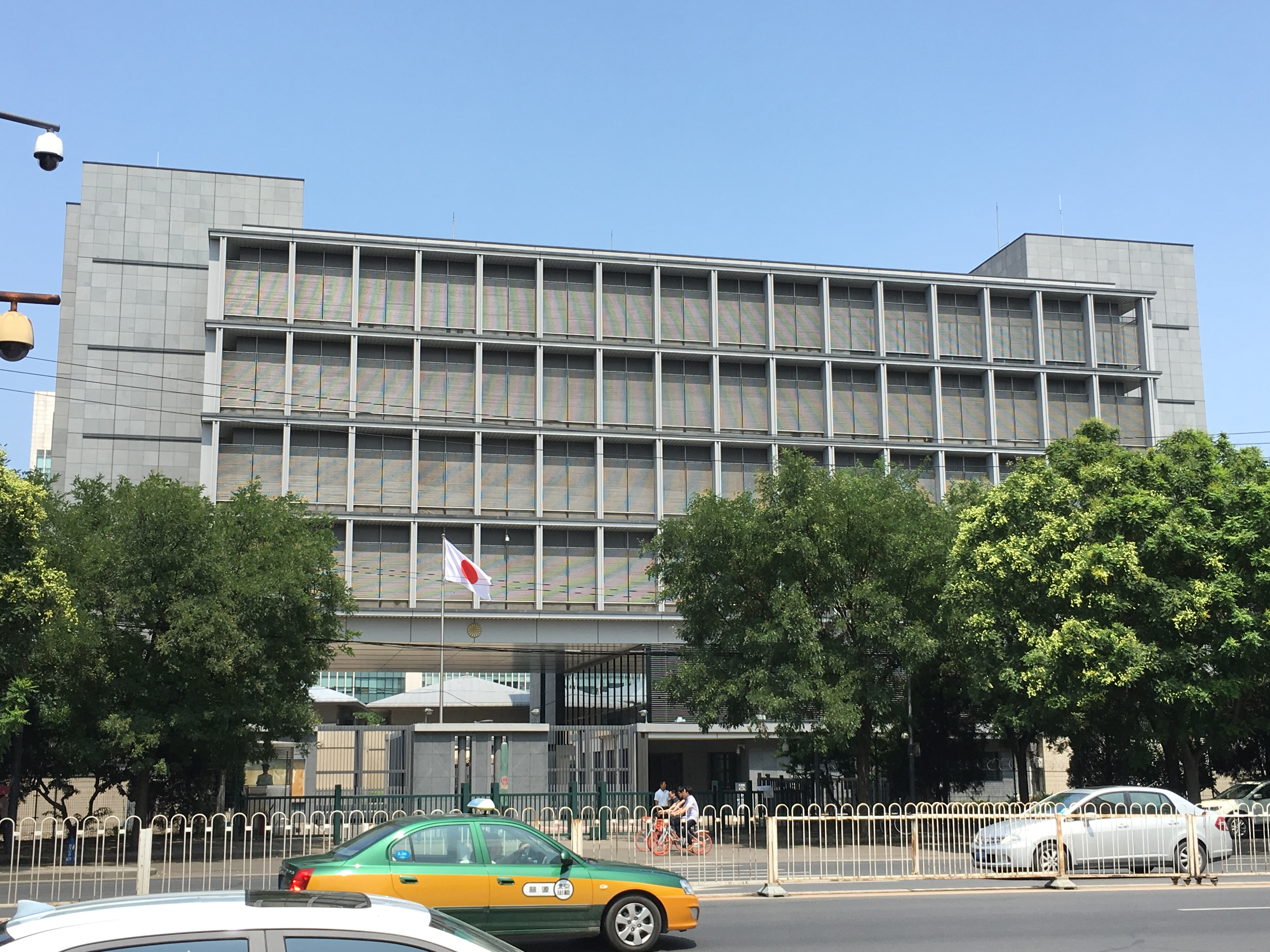
Embassy in Beijing

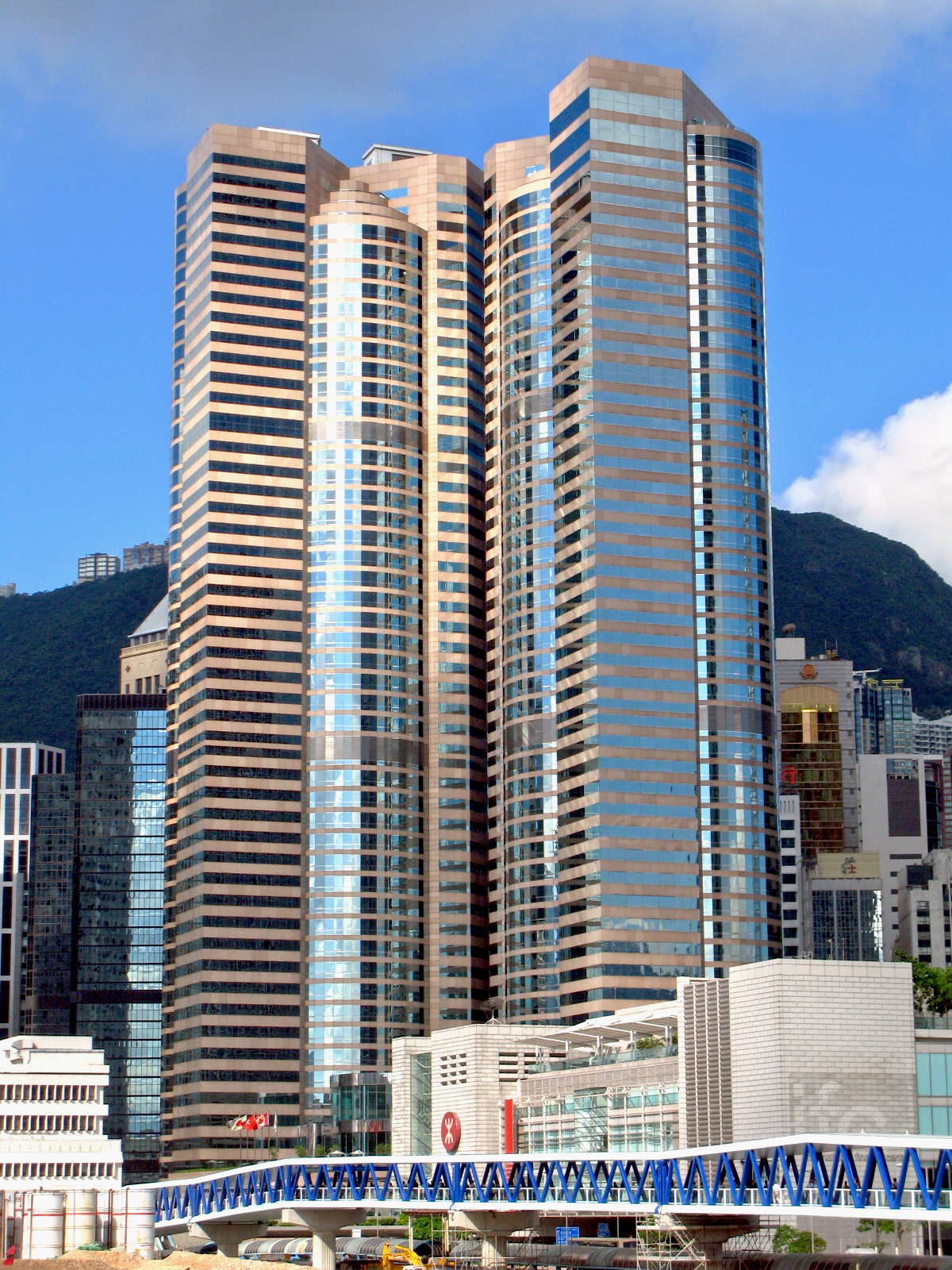
Building hosting the consulate-general in Hong Kong

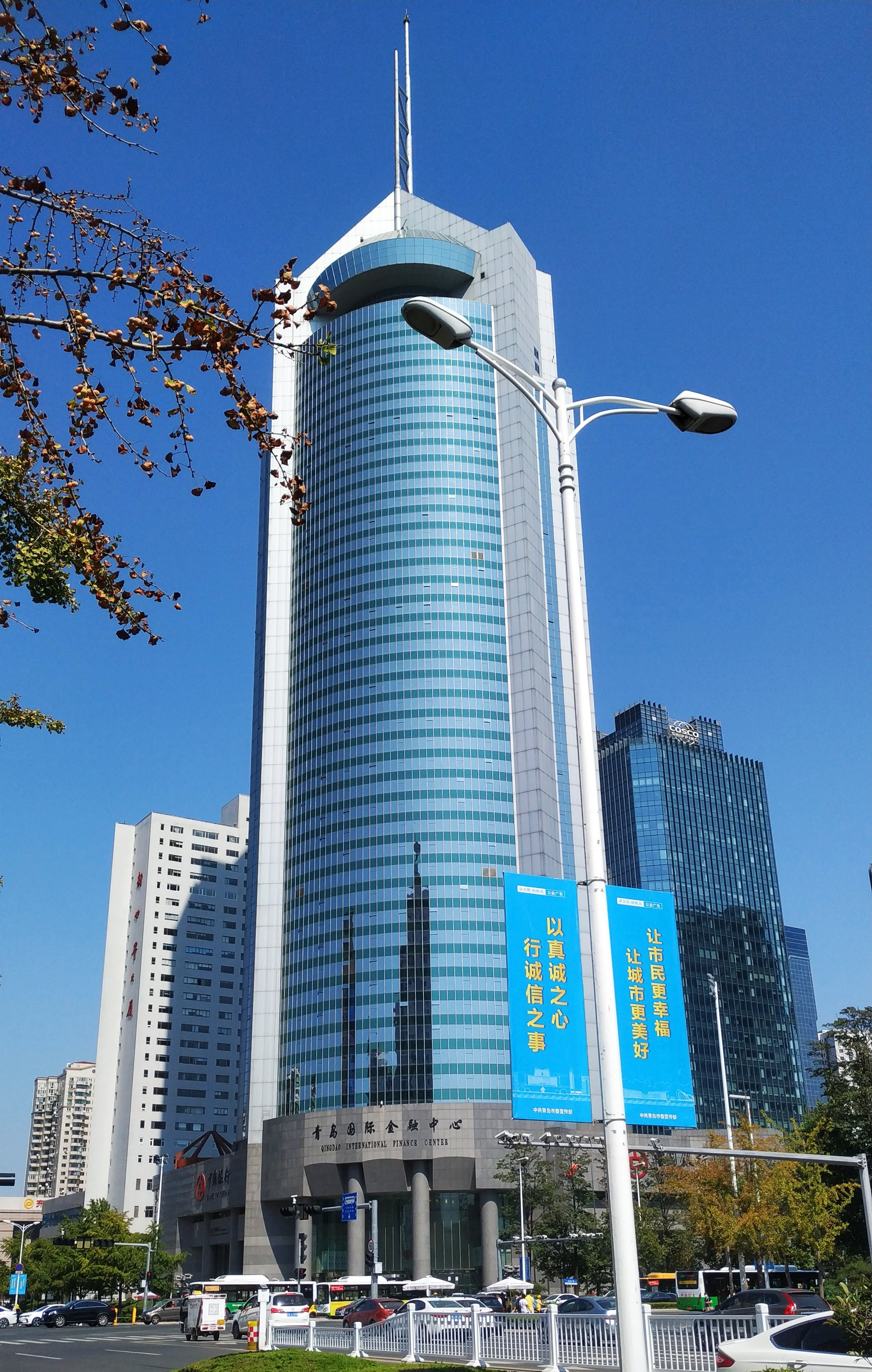
Building hosting the consulate-general in Qingdao

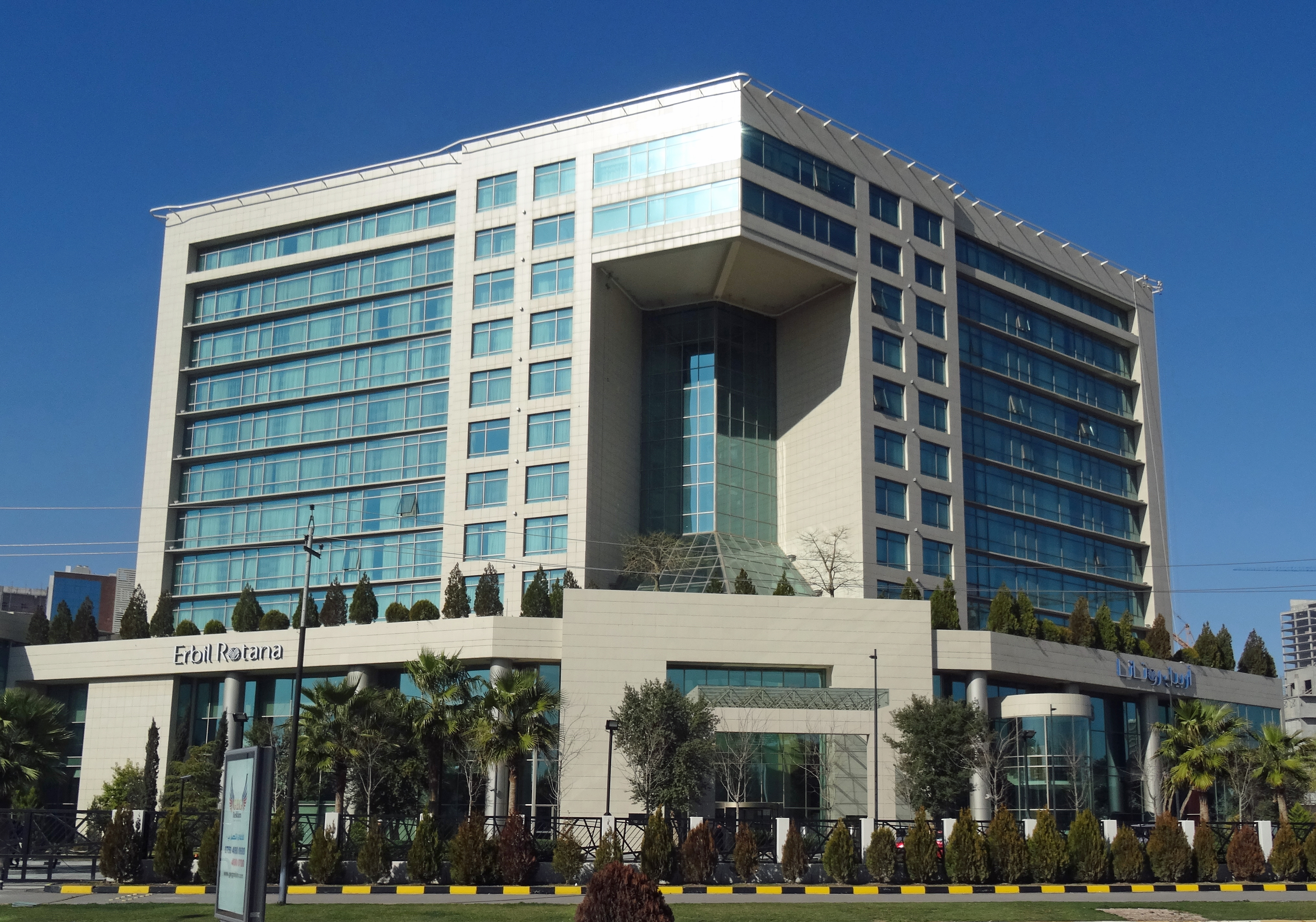
Building hosting the consular office in Erbil

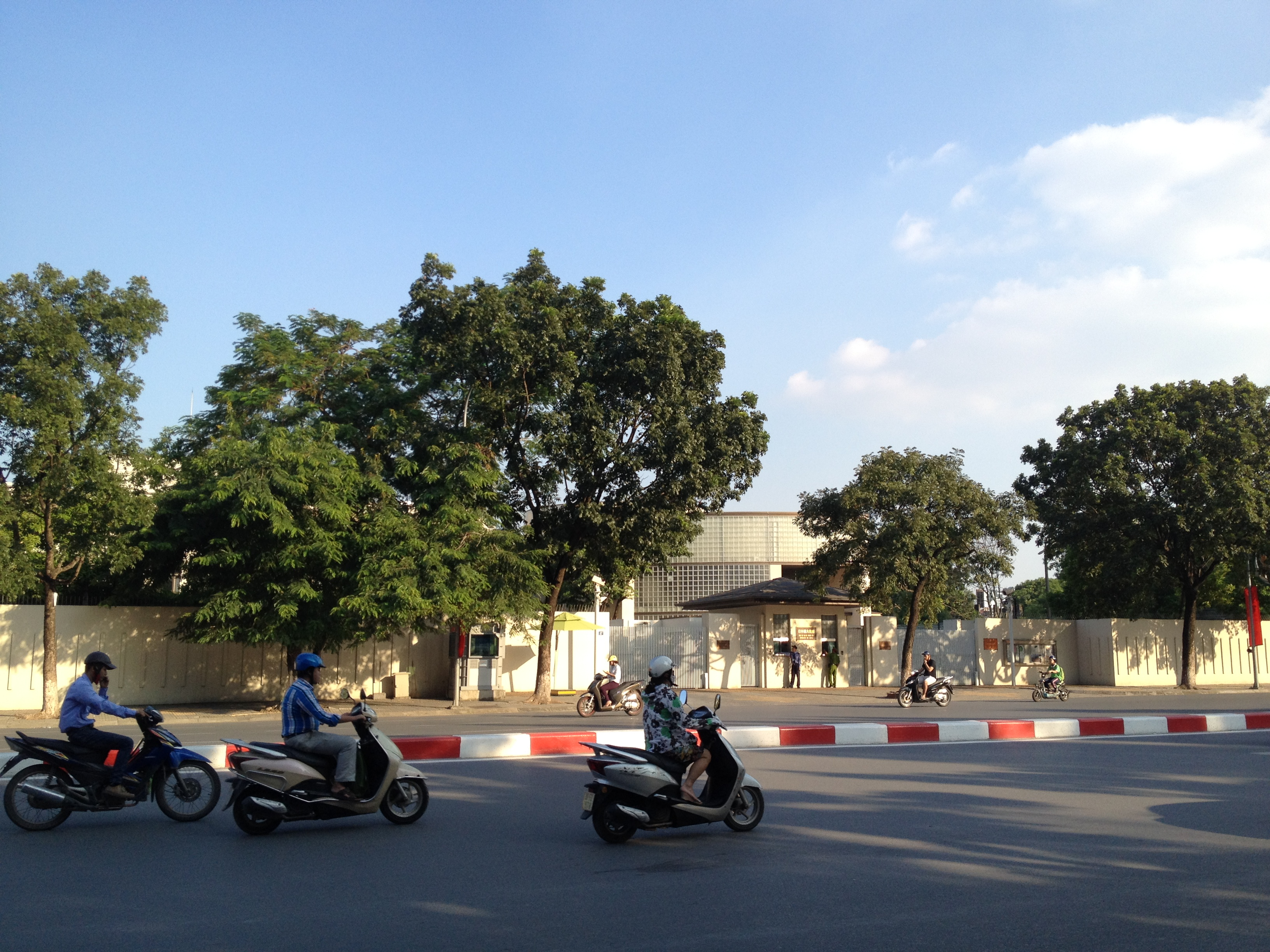
Embassy in Hanoi

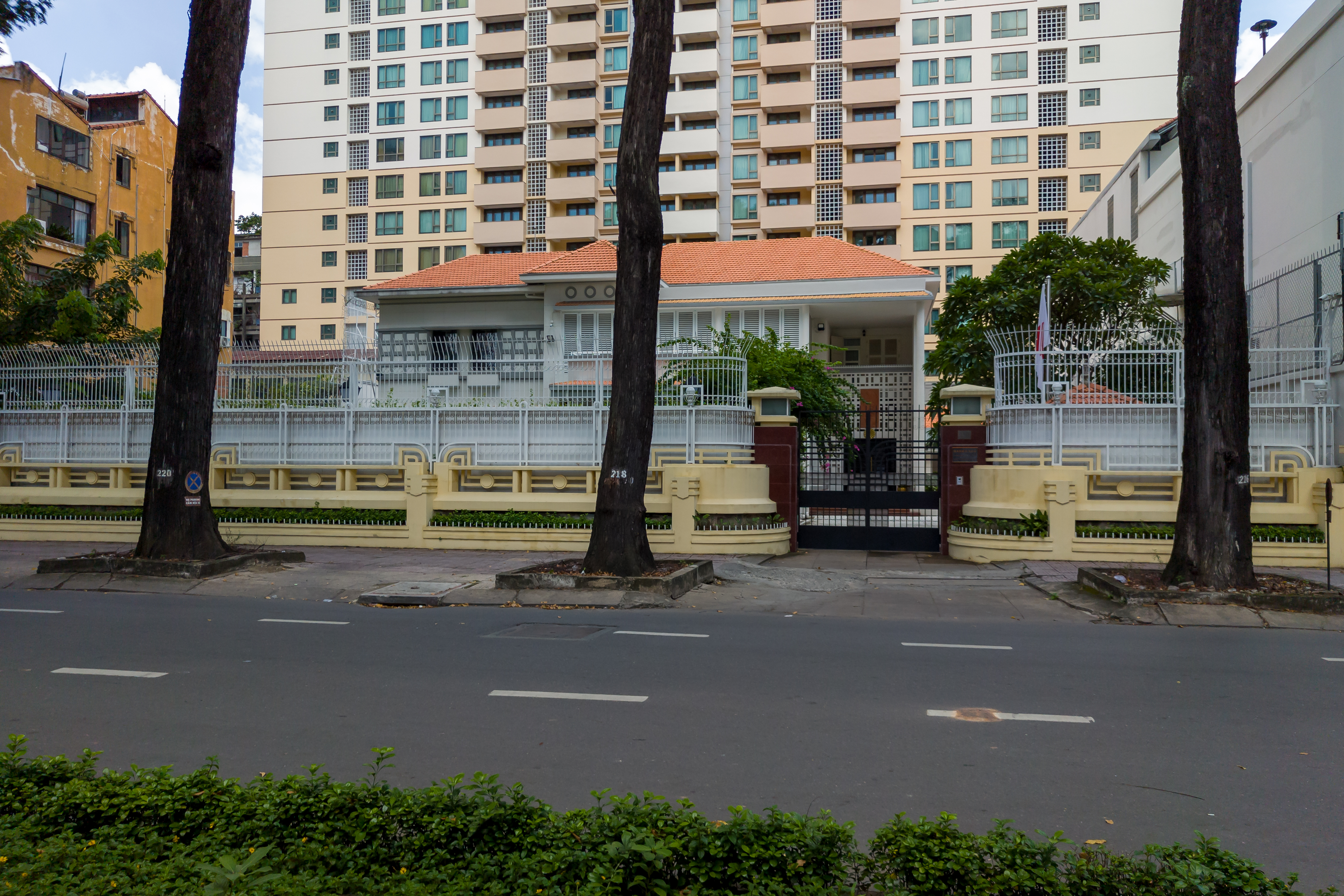
Consulate-General in Ho Chi Minh City

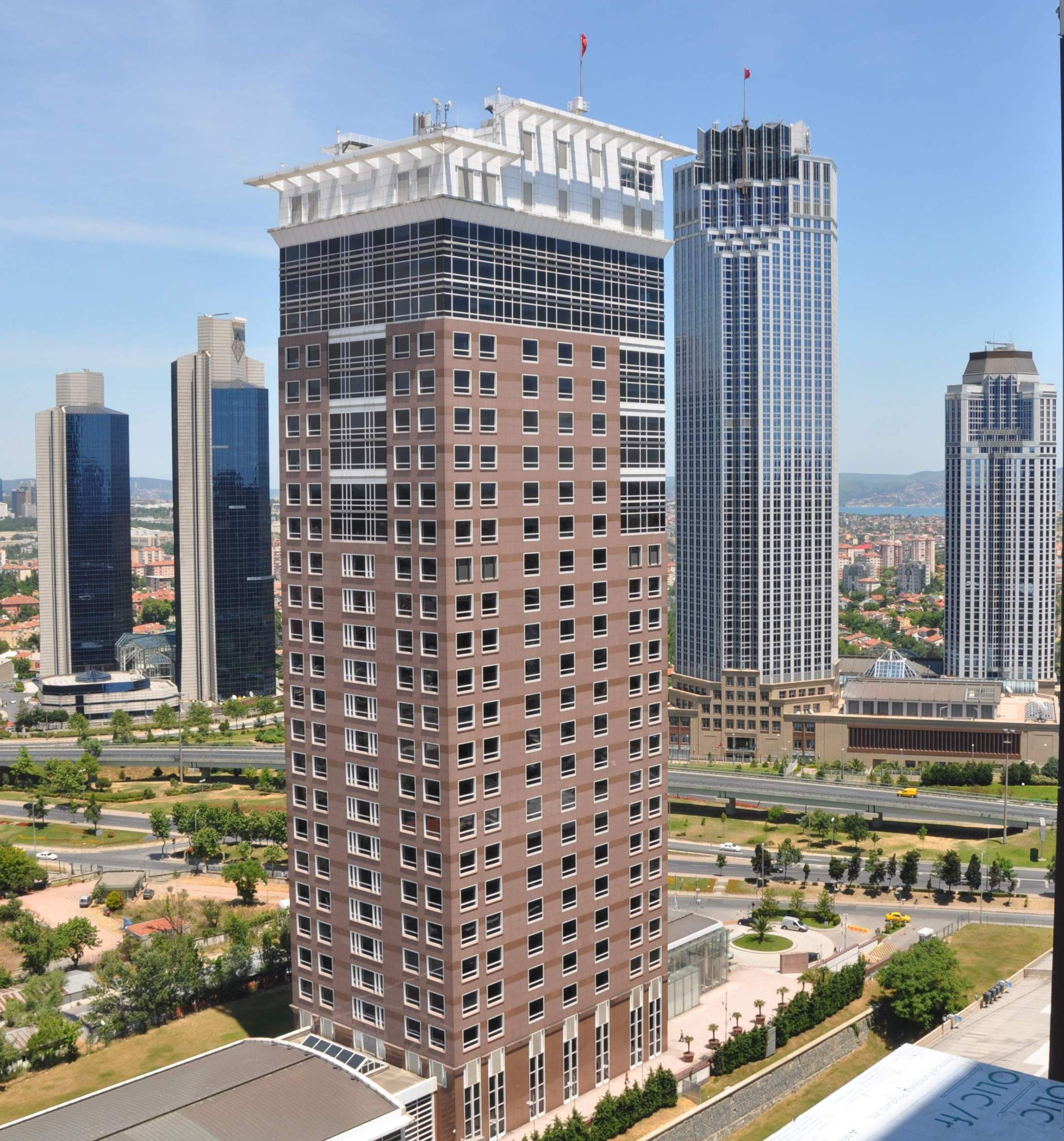
Building hosting the consulate-general in Istanbul

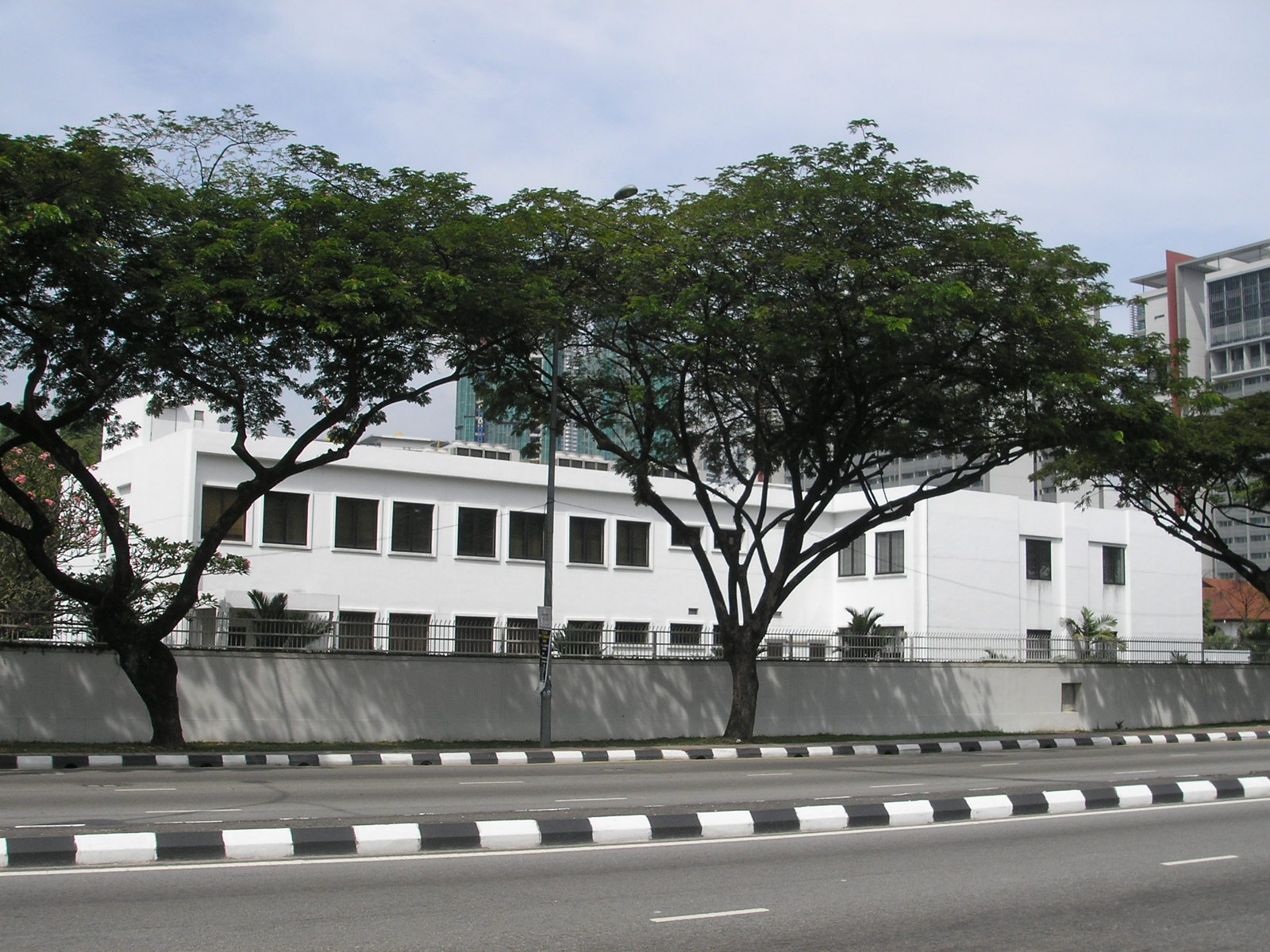
Embassy in Kuala Lumpur

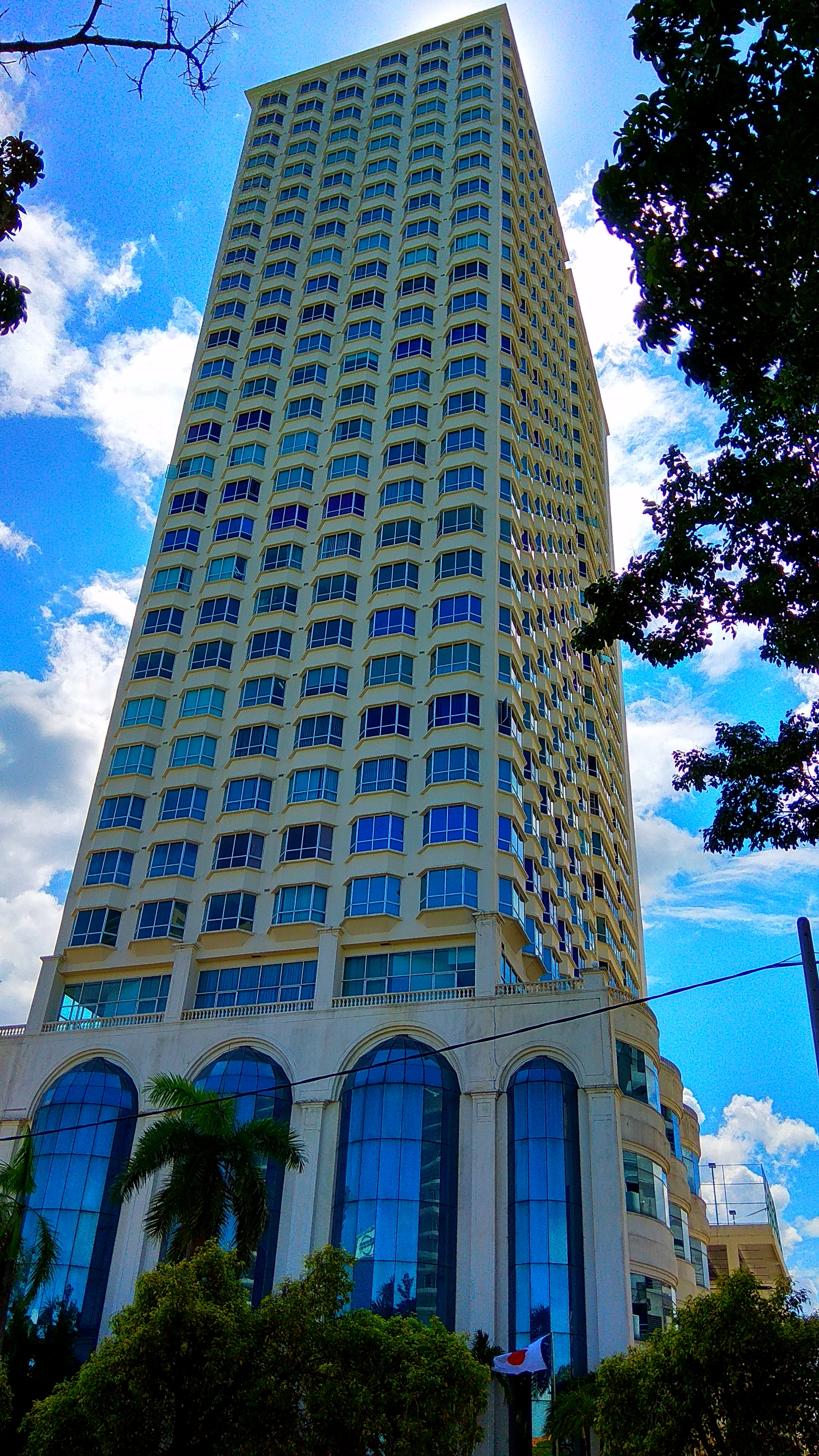
Building hosting the consulate-general in George Town, Penang

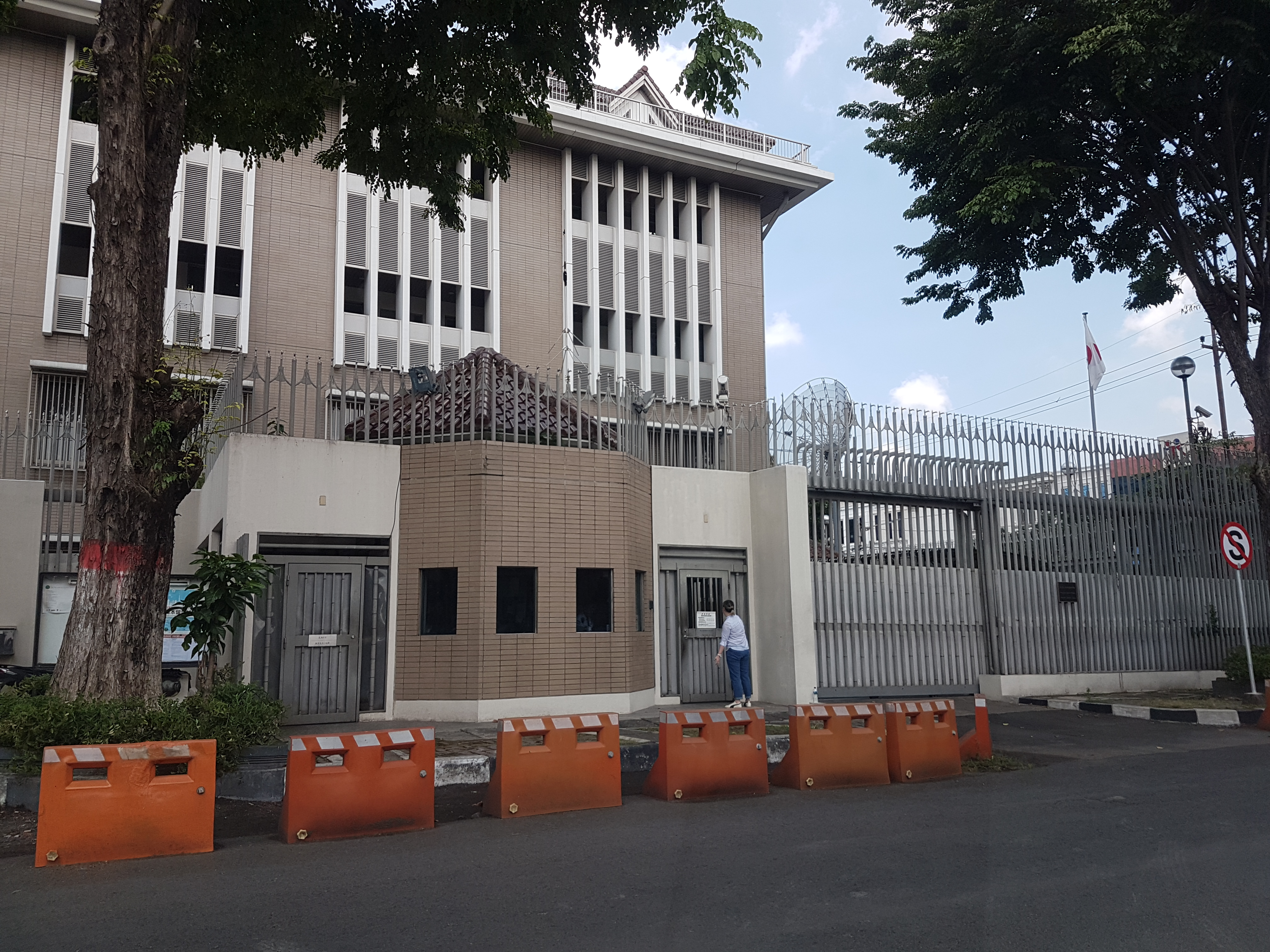
Consulate-General in Surabaya

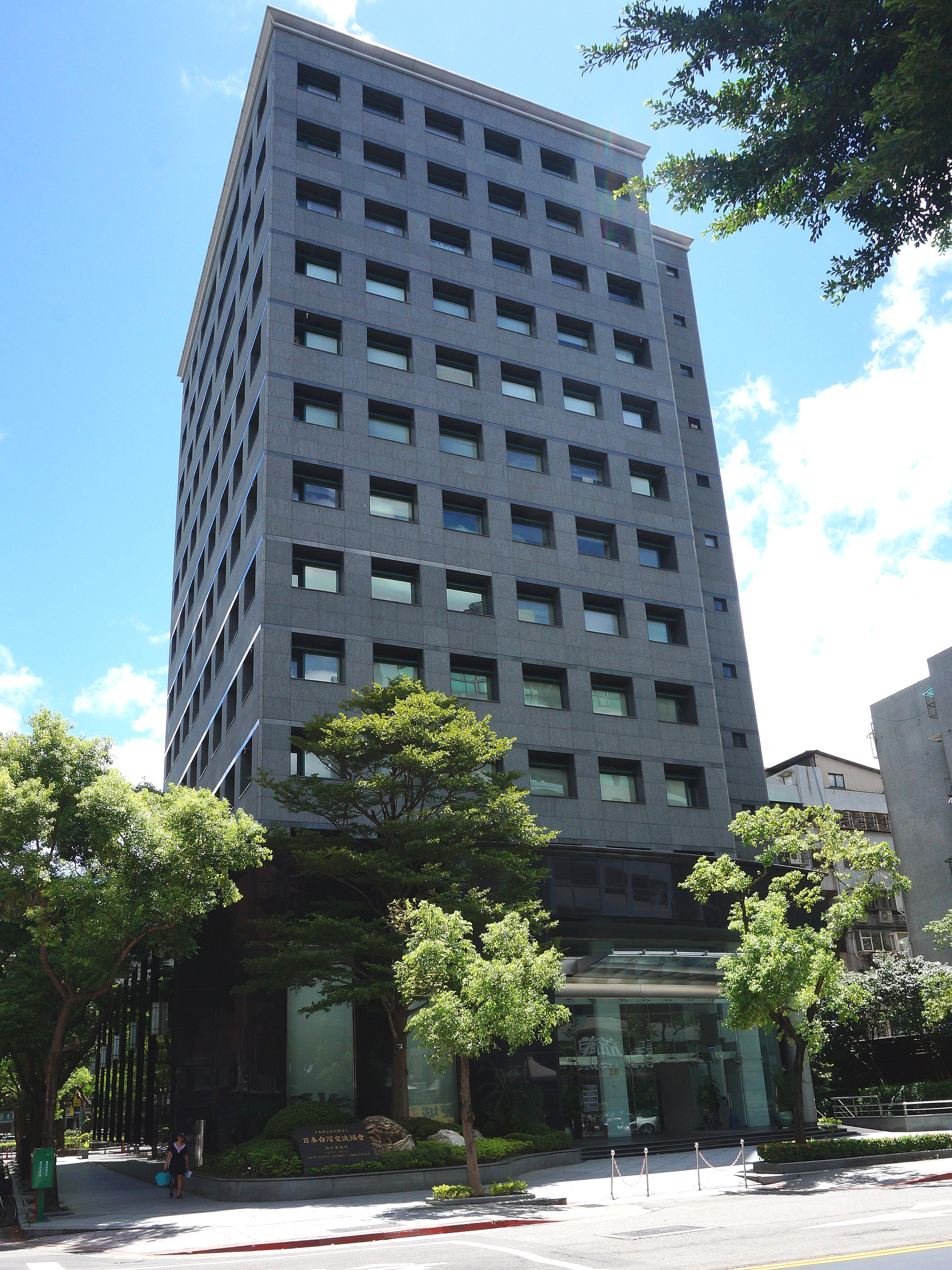
Building hosting the Exchange Association in Taipei

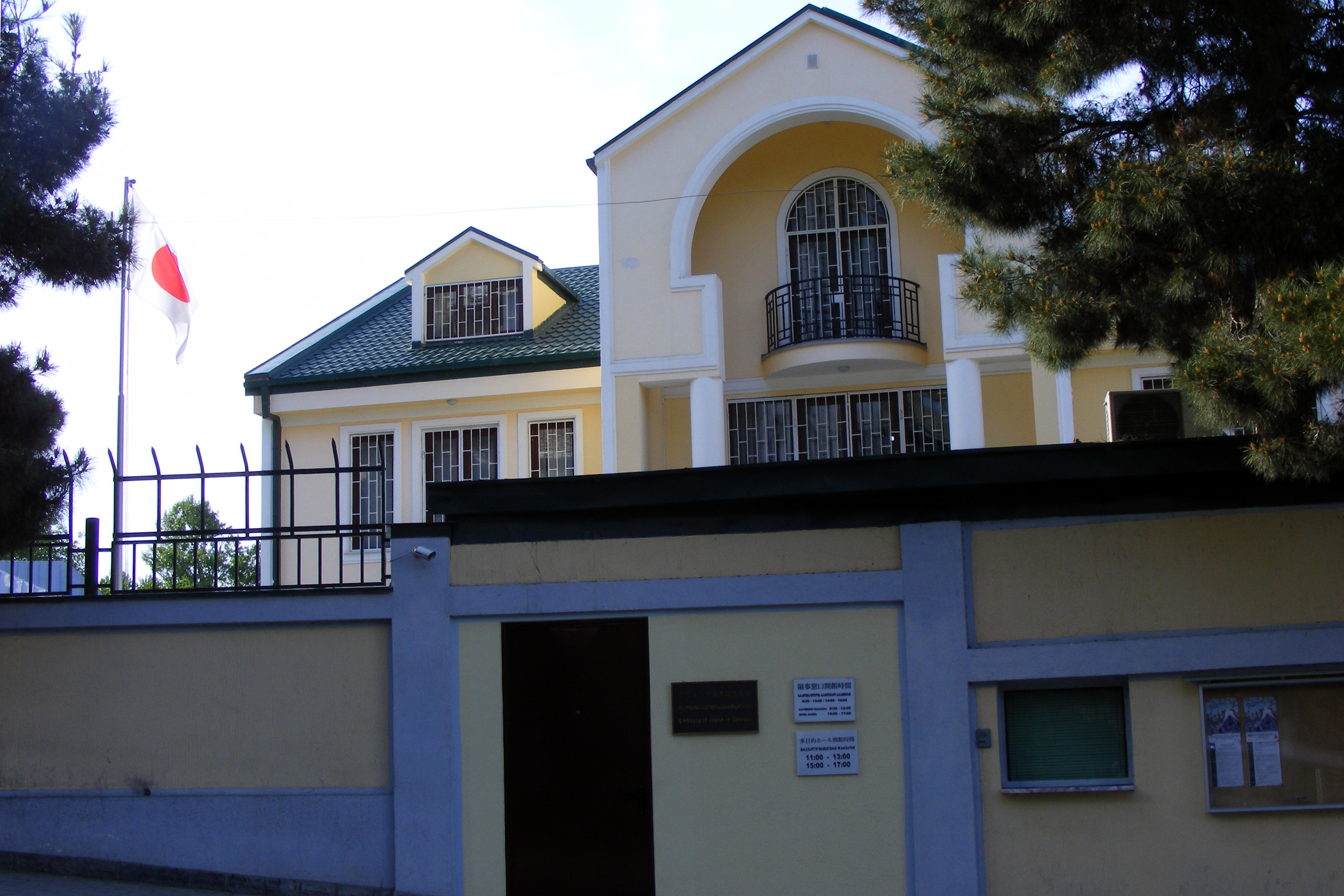
Embassy in Tbilisi

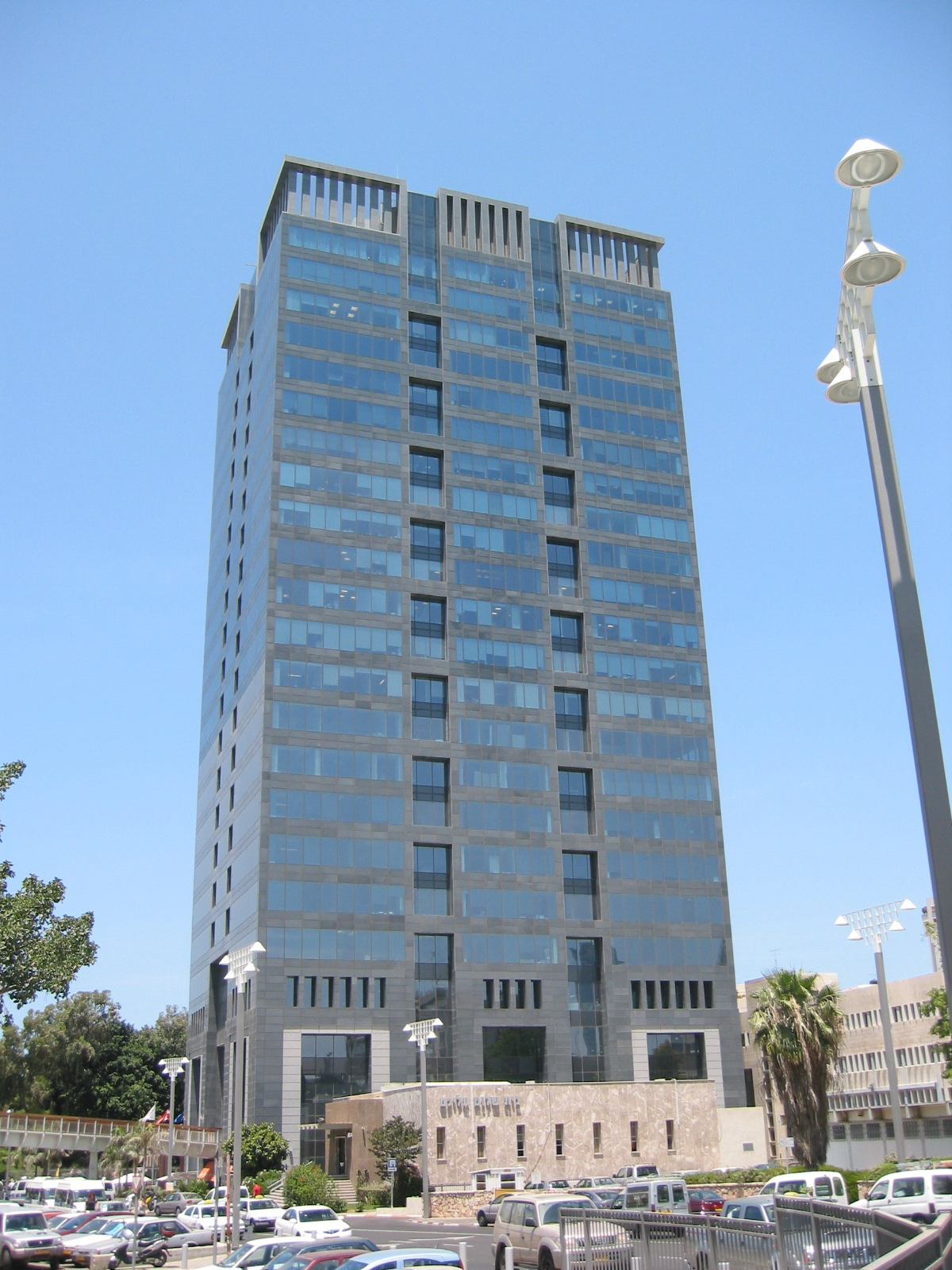
Building hosting the embassy in Tel Aviv

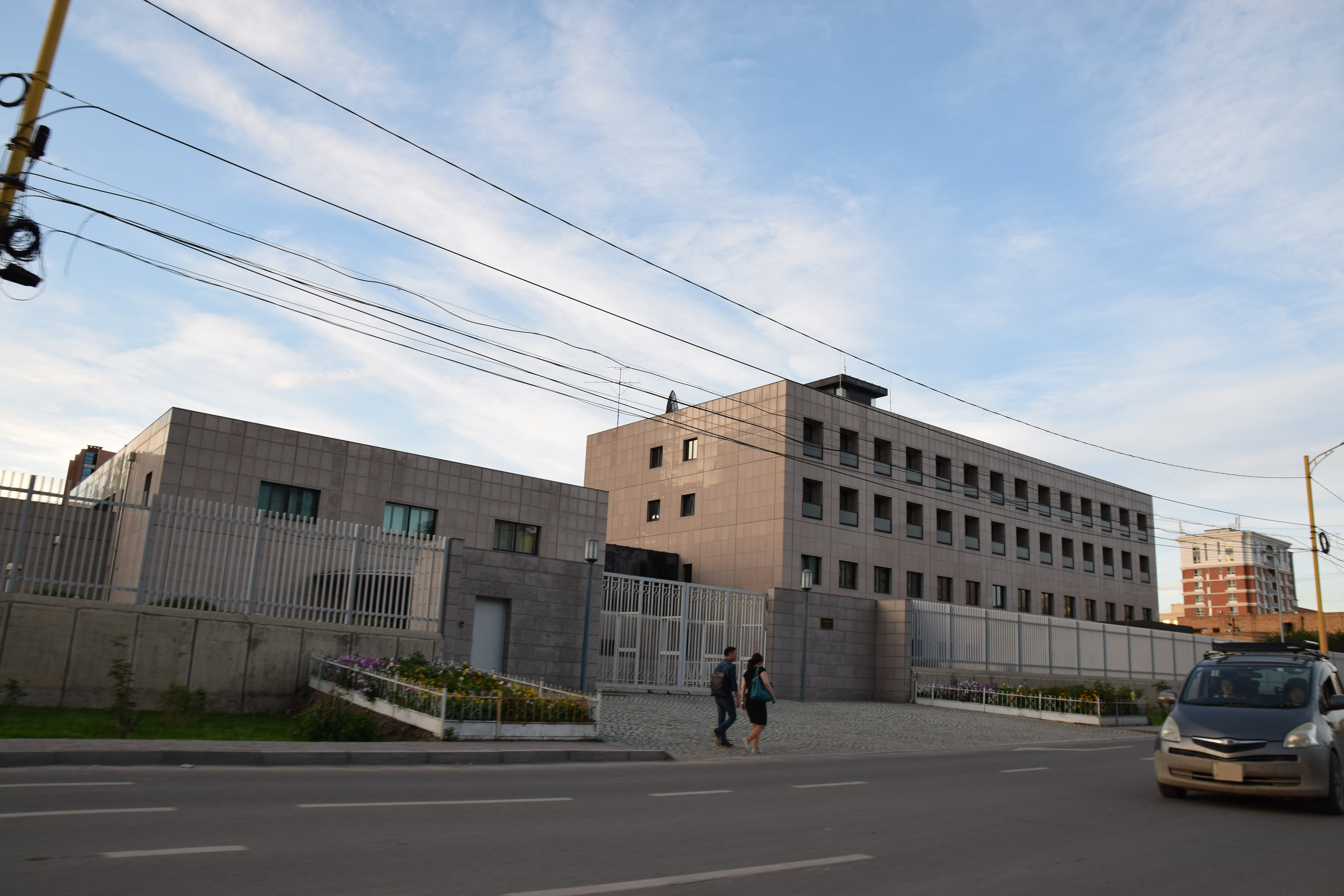
Embassy in Ulaanbaatar

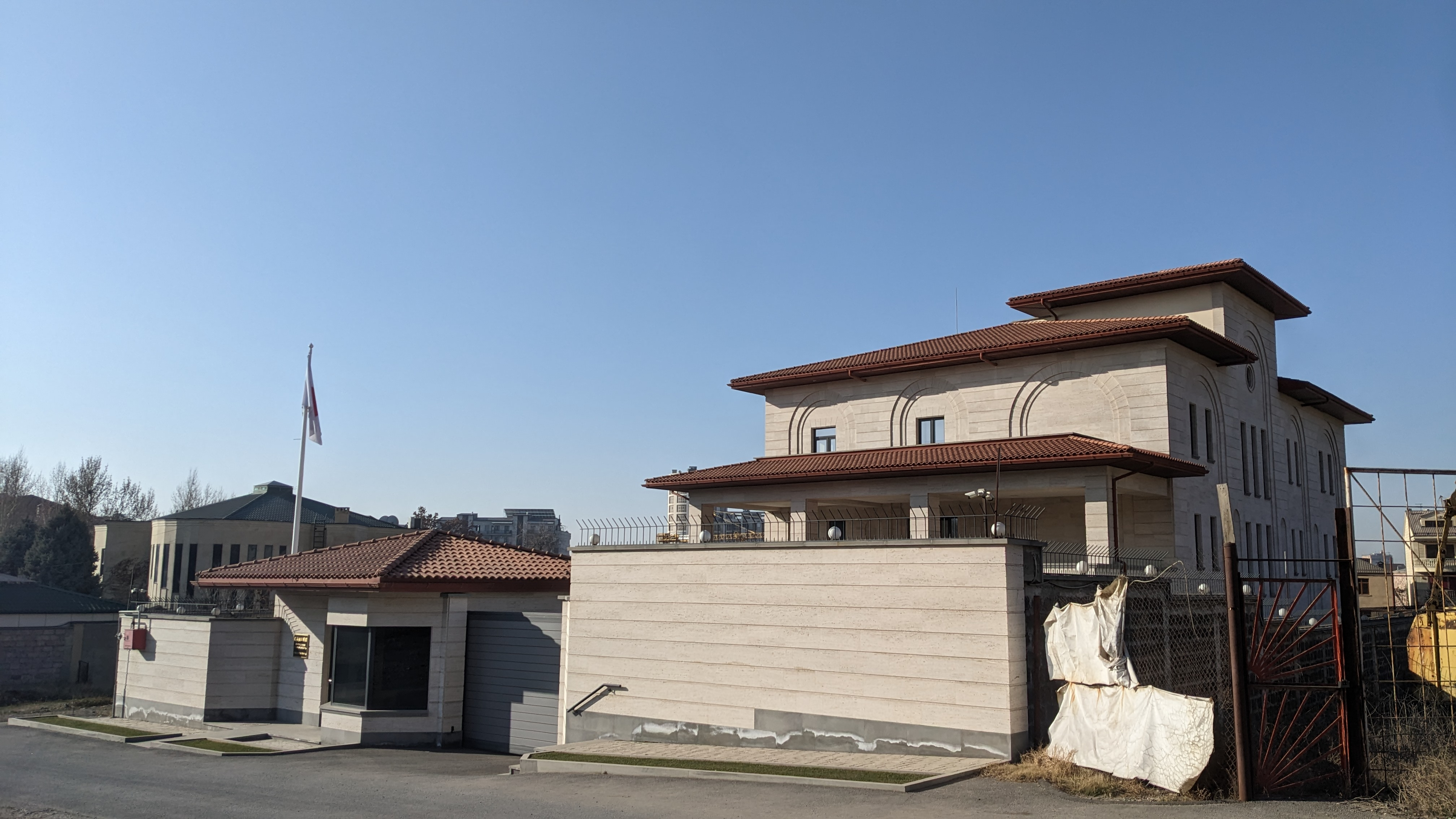
Embassy in Yerevan

=== Europe ===
Host country	Host city	Mission	Concurrent accreditation	Ref.
Albania	Tirana	Embassy		
Austria	Vienna	Embassy		
Belarus	Minsk	Embassy		
Bosnia and Herzegovina	Sarajevo	Embassy		
Belgium	Brussels	Embassy		
Bulgaria	Sofia	Embassy		
Croatia	Zagreb	Embassy		
Cyprus	Nicosia	Embassy		
Czech Republic	Prague	Embassy		
Denmark	Copenhagen	Embassy		
Estonia	Tallinn	Embassy		
Finland	Helsinki	Embassy		
France	Paris	Embassy	Countries: Andorra; Monaco	
France	Marseille	Consulate-General	Countries: Andorra; Monaco	
France	Strasbourg	Consulate-General	Countries: Andorra; Monaco	
France	Lyon	Consular Office	Countries: Andorra; Monaco	
France	Nouméa, New Caledonia	Consular Office	Countries: Andorra; Monaco	
Germany	Berlin	Embassy		
Germany	Düsseldorf	Consulate-General		
Germany	Frankfurt	Consulate-General		
Germany	Hamburg	Consulate-General		
Germany	Munich	Consulate-General		
Greece	Athens	Embassy		
Holy See	Rome (Note: The Japanese Embassy to the Holy See is located outside Vatican territory in Rome.)	Embassy		
Hungary	Budapest	Embassy		
Iceland	Reykjavík	Embassy		
Ireland	Dublin	Embassy		
Italy	Rome	Embassy	Countries: San Marino; International Organizations: Food and Agriculture Organization; International Fund for Agricultural Development; World Food Programme	
Italy	Milan	Consulate-General	Countries: San Marino; International Organizations: Food and Agriculture Organization; International Fund for Agricultural Development; World Food Programme	
Kosovo	Pristina	Embassy		
Latvia	Riga	Embassy		
Lithuania	Vilnius	Embassy		
Luxembourg	Luxembourg City	Embassy		
Malta	Sliema	Embassy		
Moldova	Chișinău	Embassy		
Netherlands	The Hague	Embassy	International Organizations: Organisation for the Prohibition of Chemical Weapons	
North Macedonia	Skopje	Embassy		
Norway	Oslo	Embassy		
Poland	Warsaw	Embassy		
Portugal	Lisbon	Embassy		
Romania	Bucharest	Embassy		
Russia	Moscow	Embassy		
Russia	Khabarovsk	Consulate-General		
Russia	Saint Petersburg	Consulate-General		
Russia	Vladivostok	Consulate-General		
Russia	Yuzhno-Sakhalinsk	Consulate-General		
Serbia	Belgrade	Embassy	Countries: Montenegro	
Slovakia	Bratislava	Embassy		
Slovenia	Ljubljana	Embassy		
Spain	Madrid	Embassy		
Spain	Barcelona	Consulate-General		
Spain	Las Palmas de Gran Canaria	Consular office		
Sweden	Stockholm	Embassy		
Switzerland	Bern	Embassy	Countries: Liechtenstein	
Switzerland	Geneva	Consular office	Countries: Liechtenstein	
Ukraine	Kyiv	Embassy		
United Kingdom	London	Embassy	International Organizations: International Maritime Organization	
United Kingdom	Edinburgh	Consulate-General	International Organizations: International Maritime Organization	

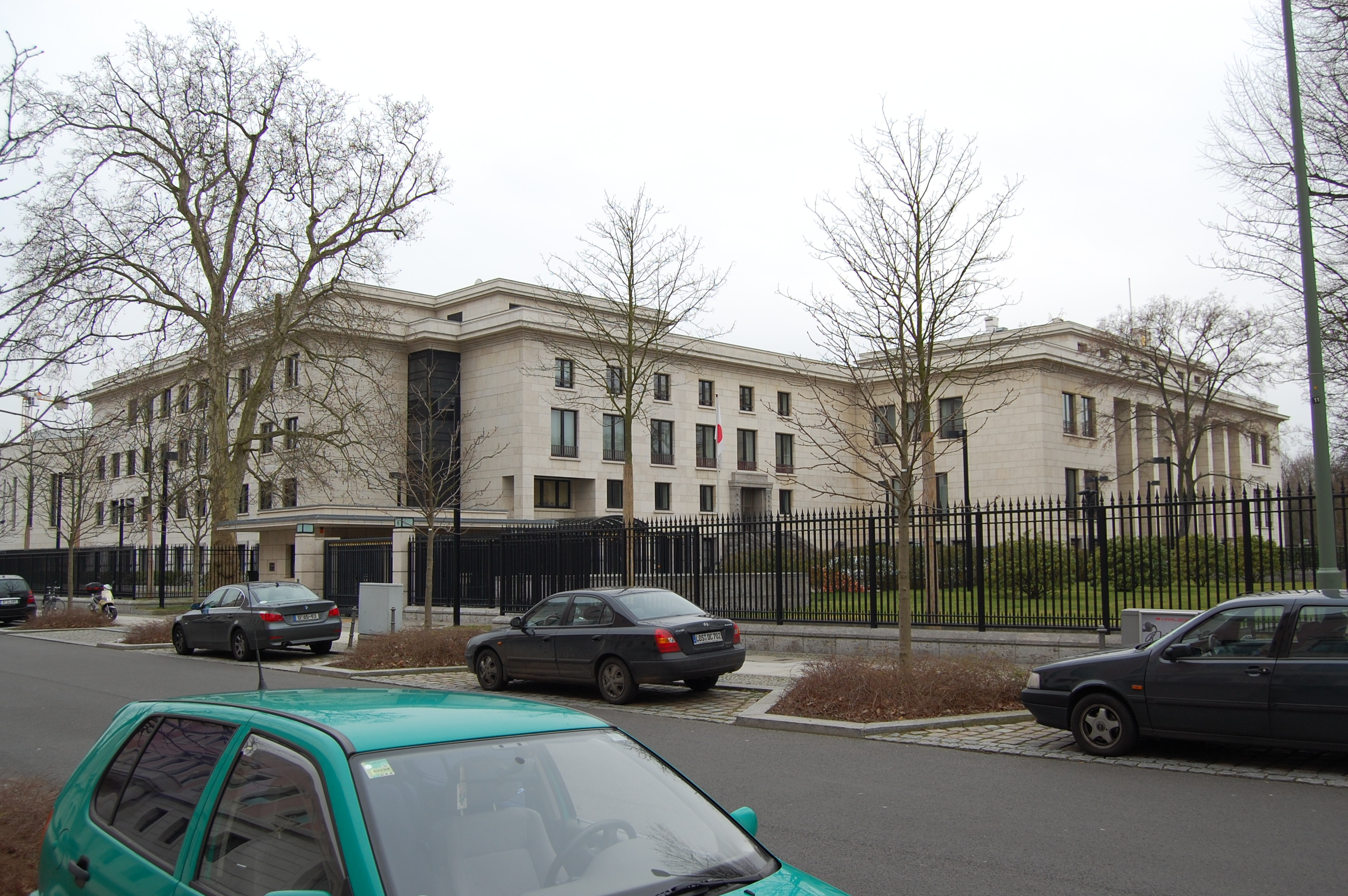
Embassy in Berlin

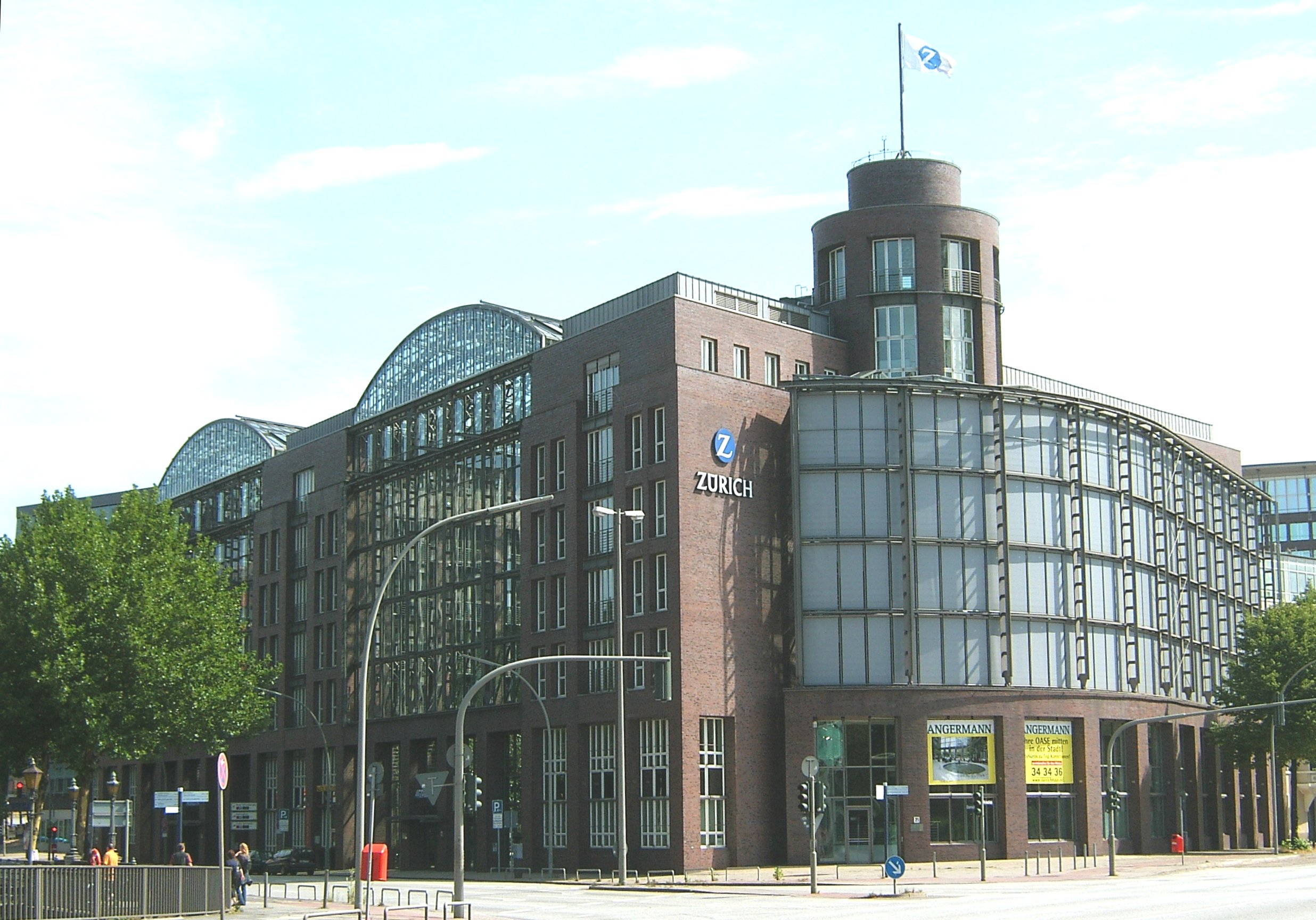
Consulate-General in Hamburg

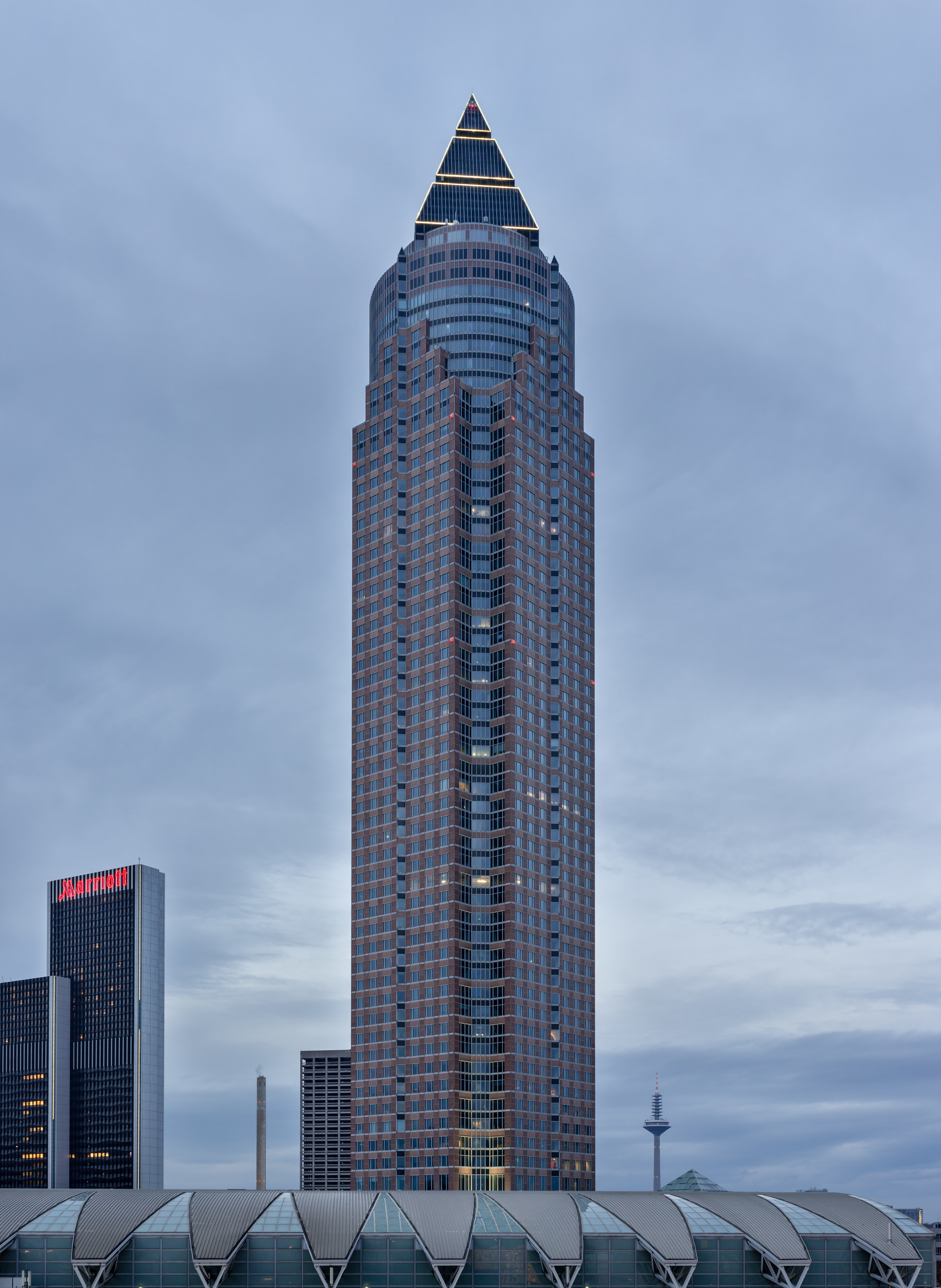
Building hosting the consulate-general in Frankfurt

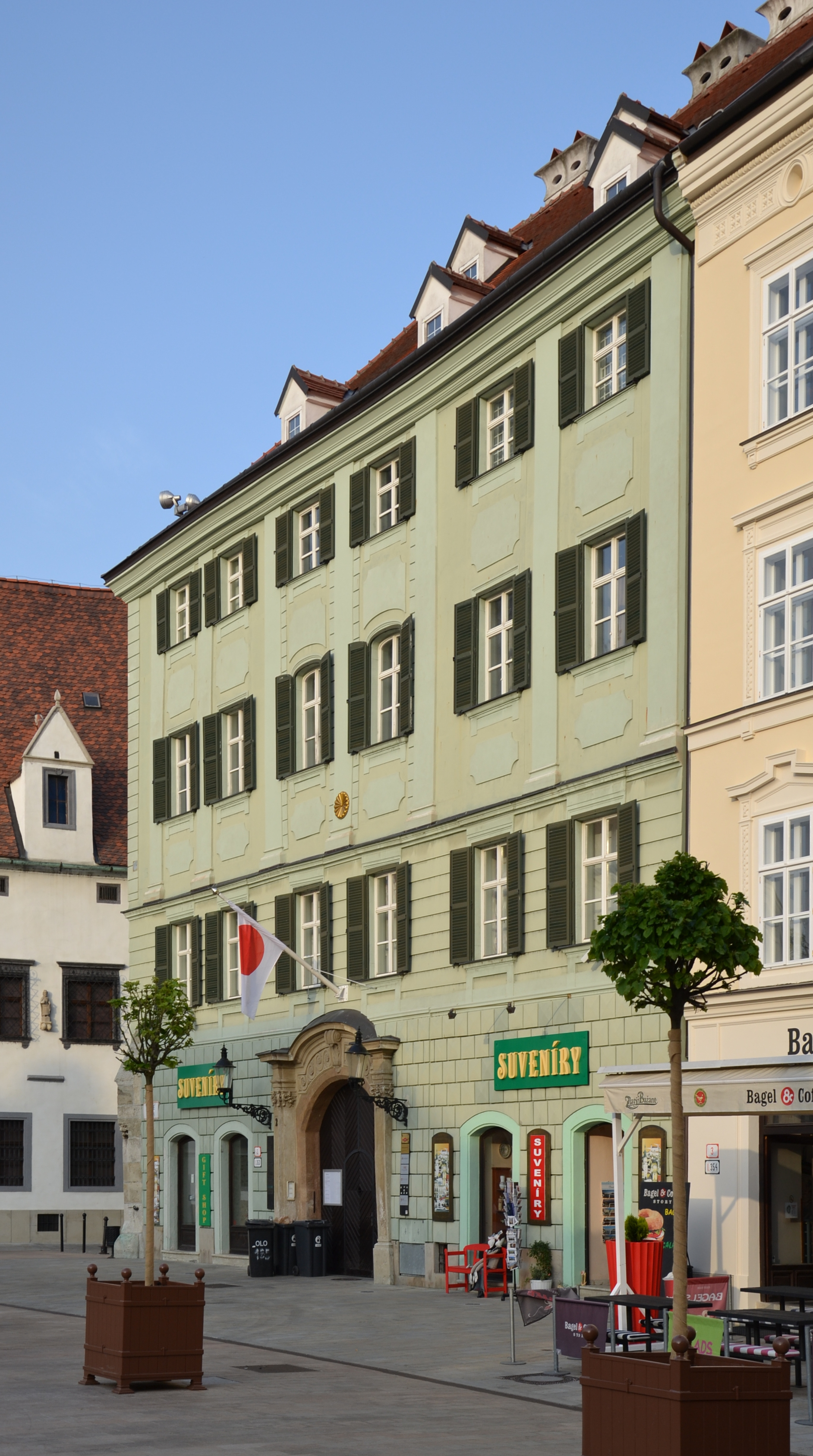
Building hosting the embassy in Bratislava

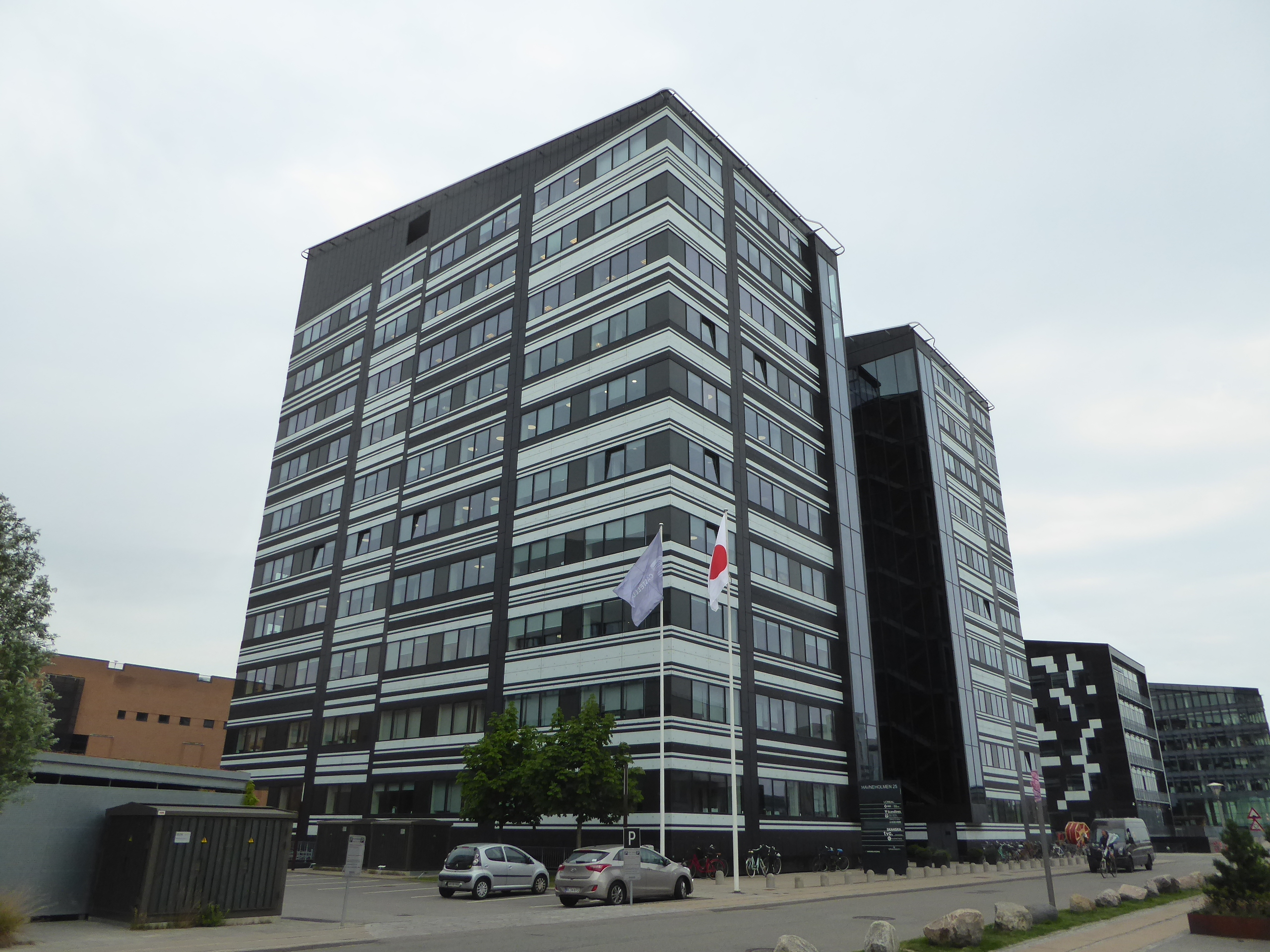
Embassy in Copenhagen

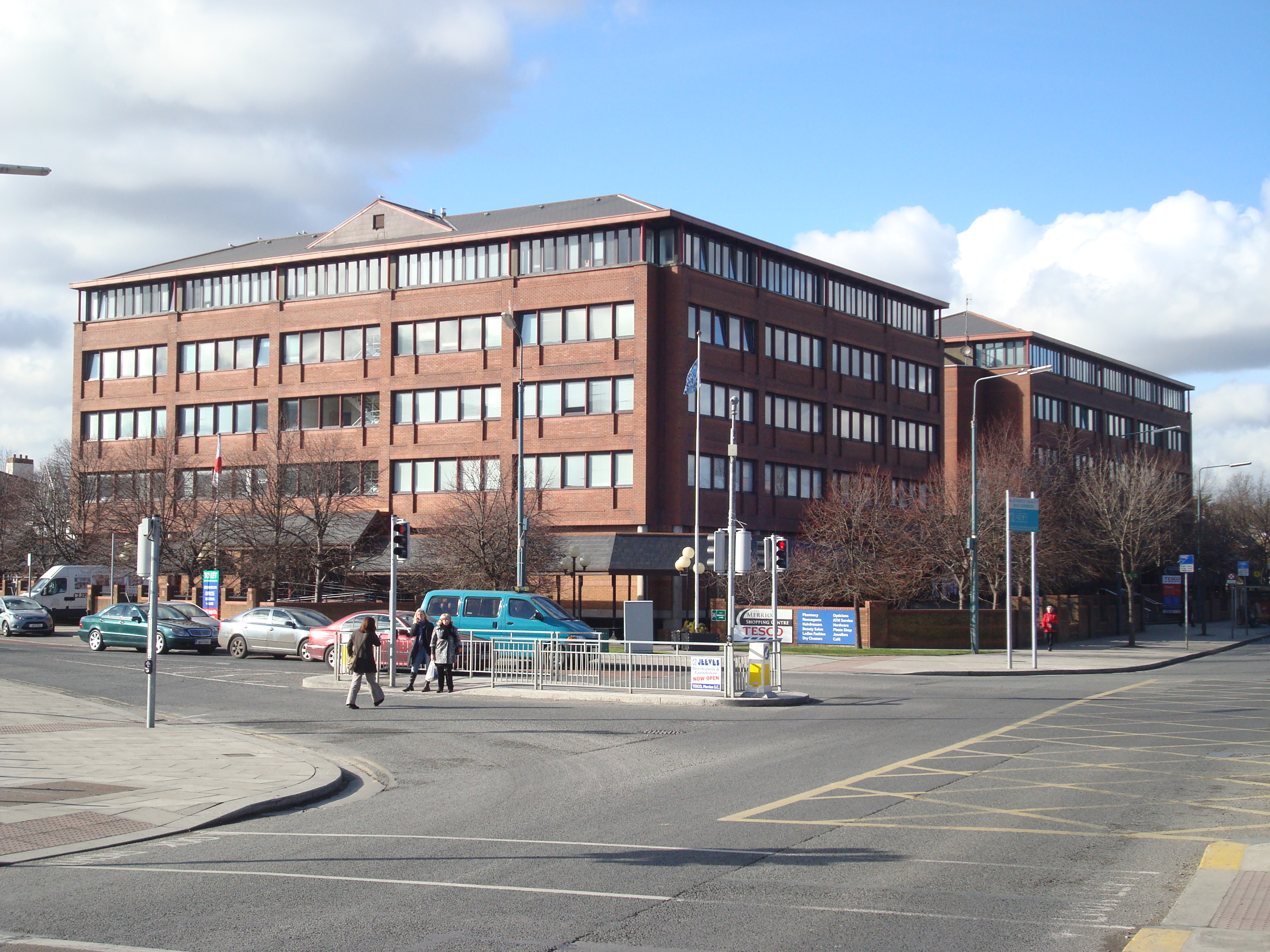
Building hosting the embassy in Dublin

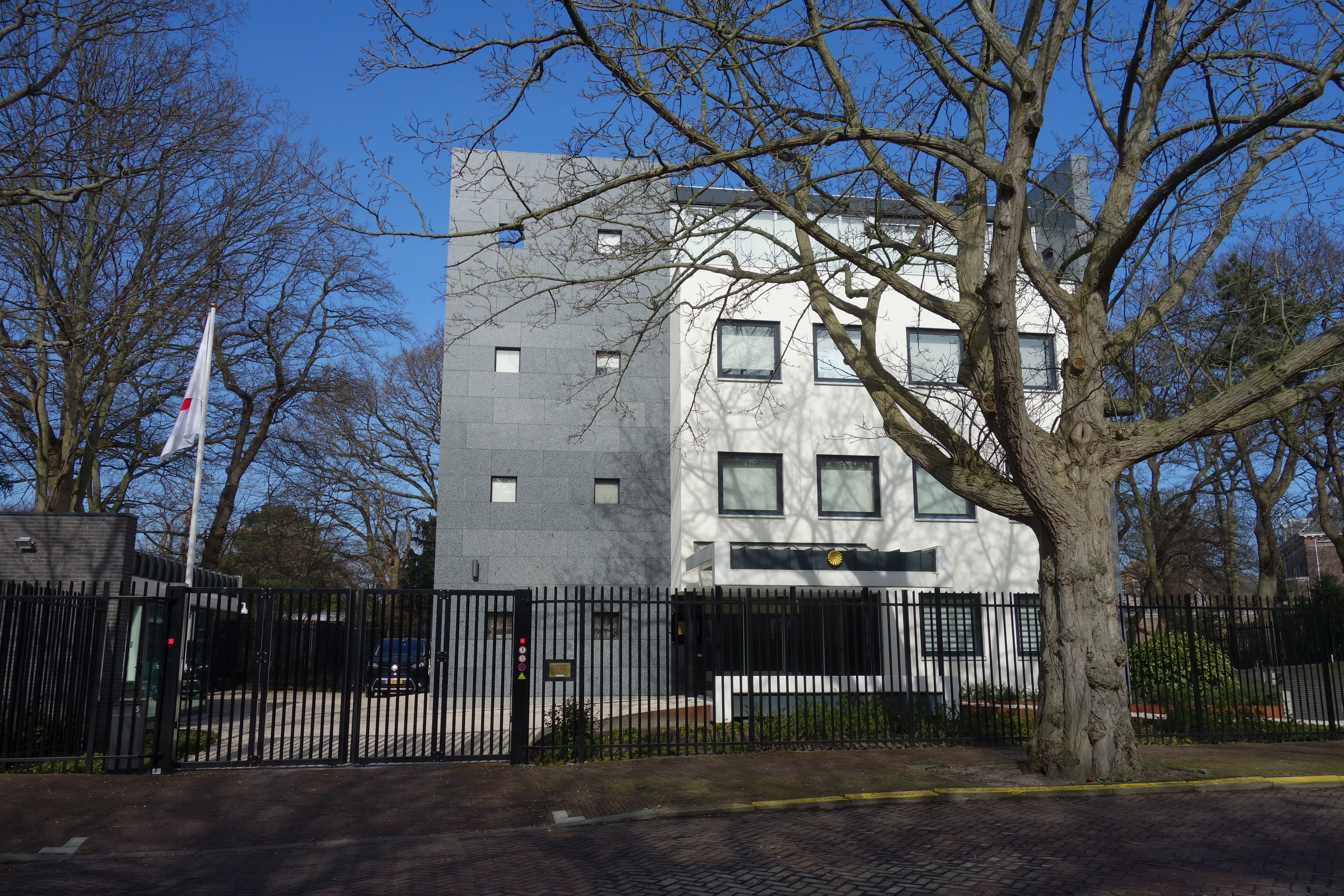
Embassy in The Hague

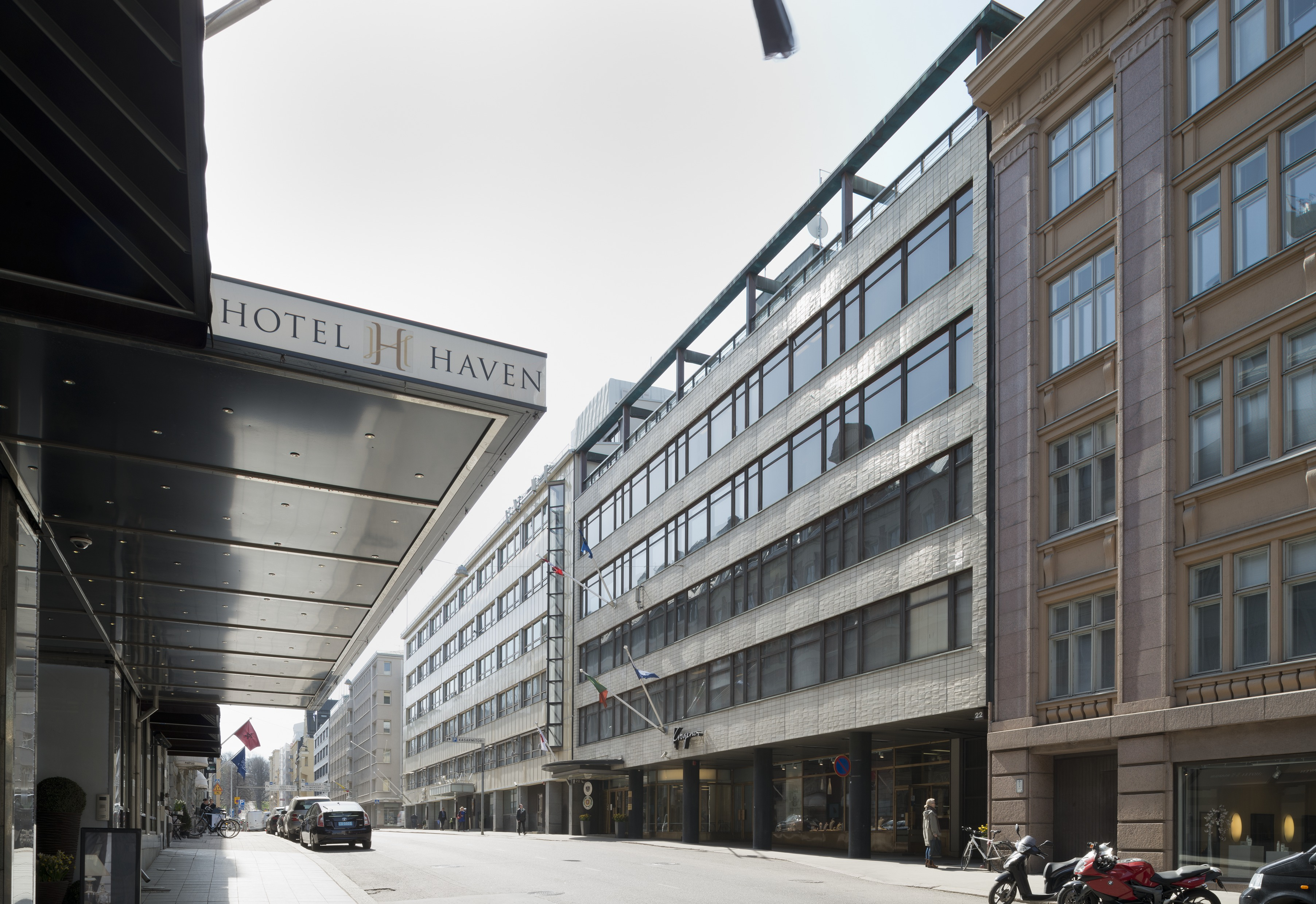
Building hosting the Embassy in Helsinki

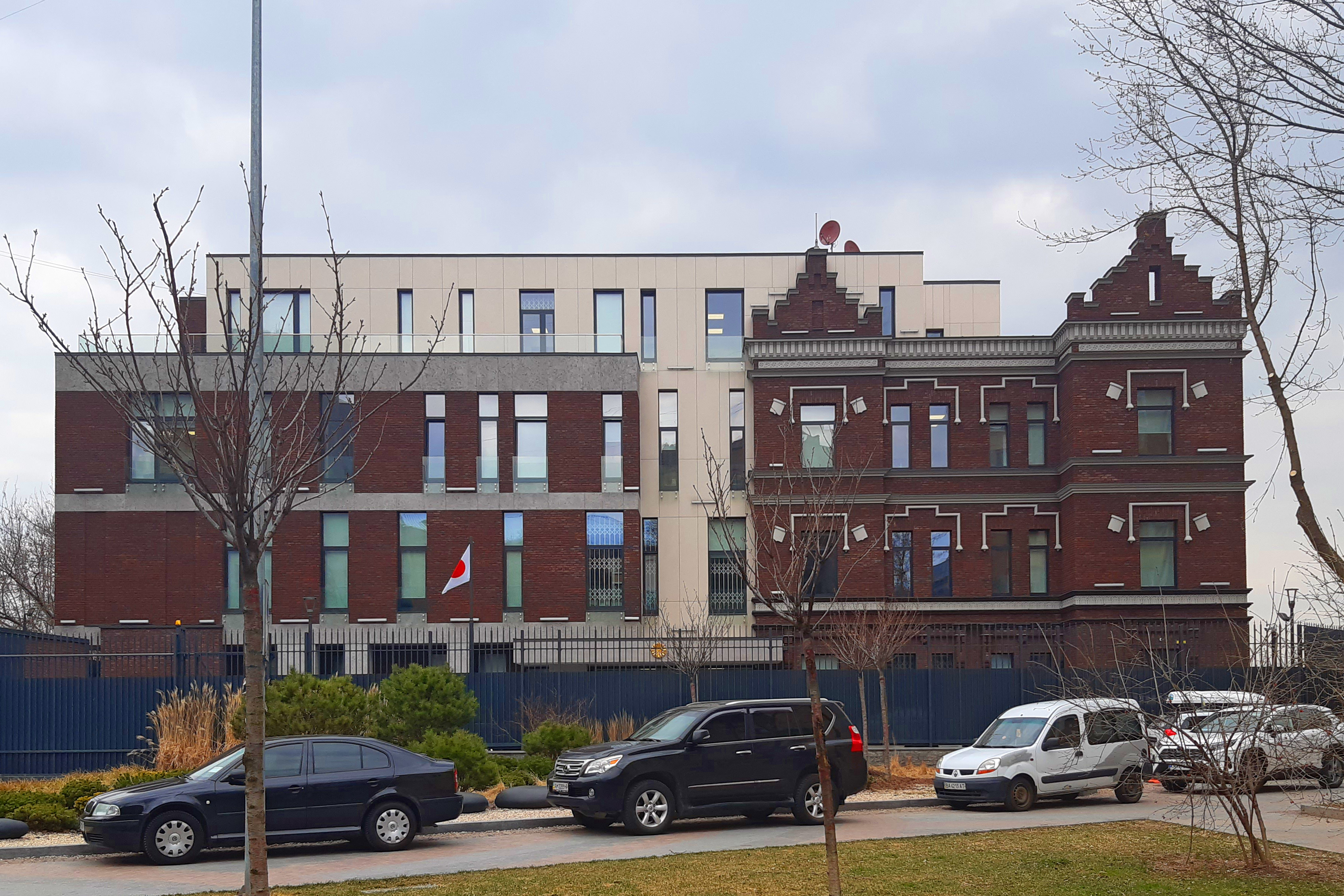
Embassy in Kyiv

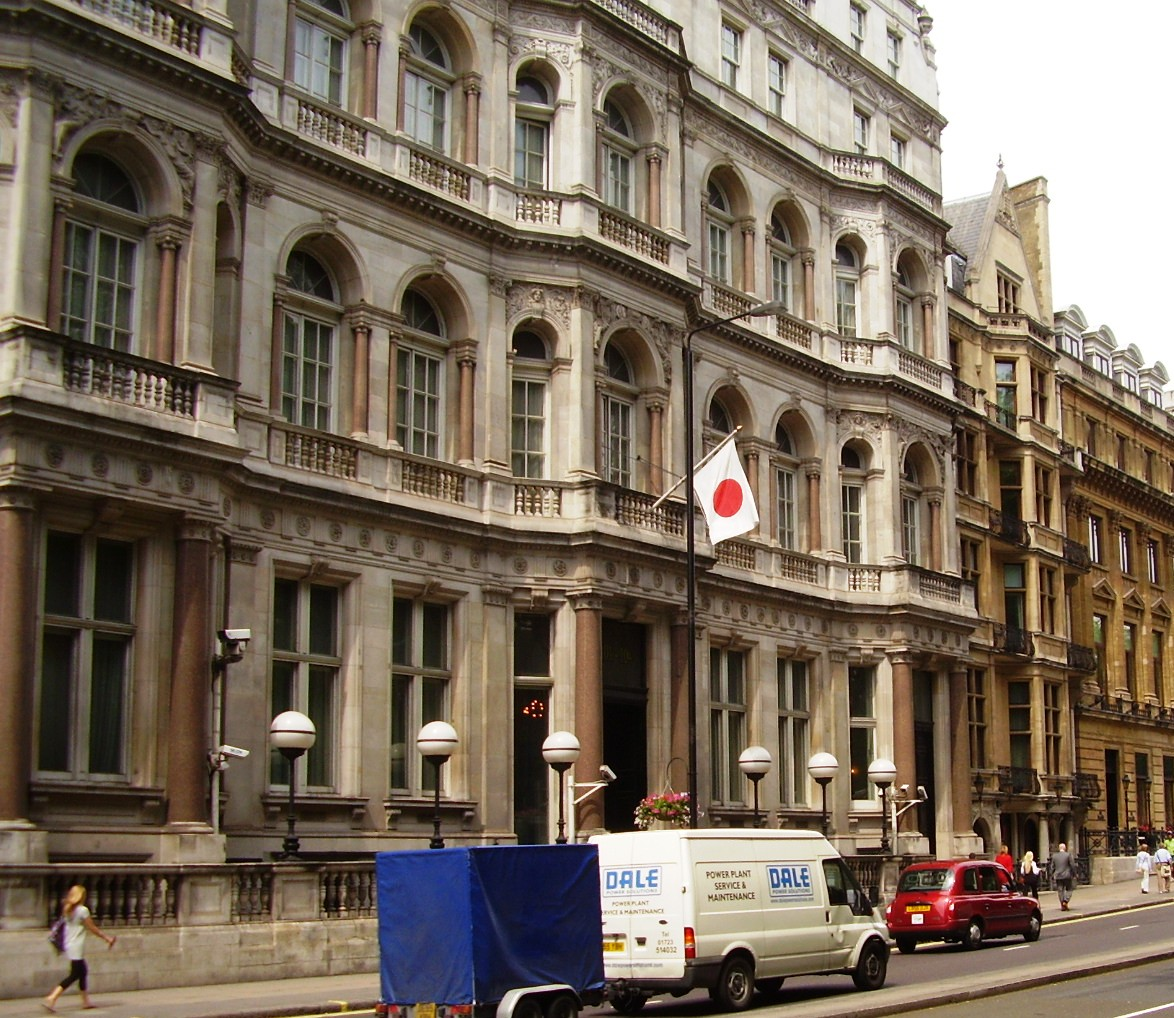
Embassy in London

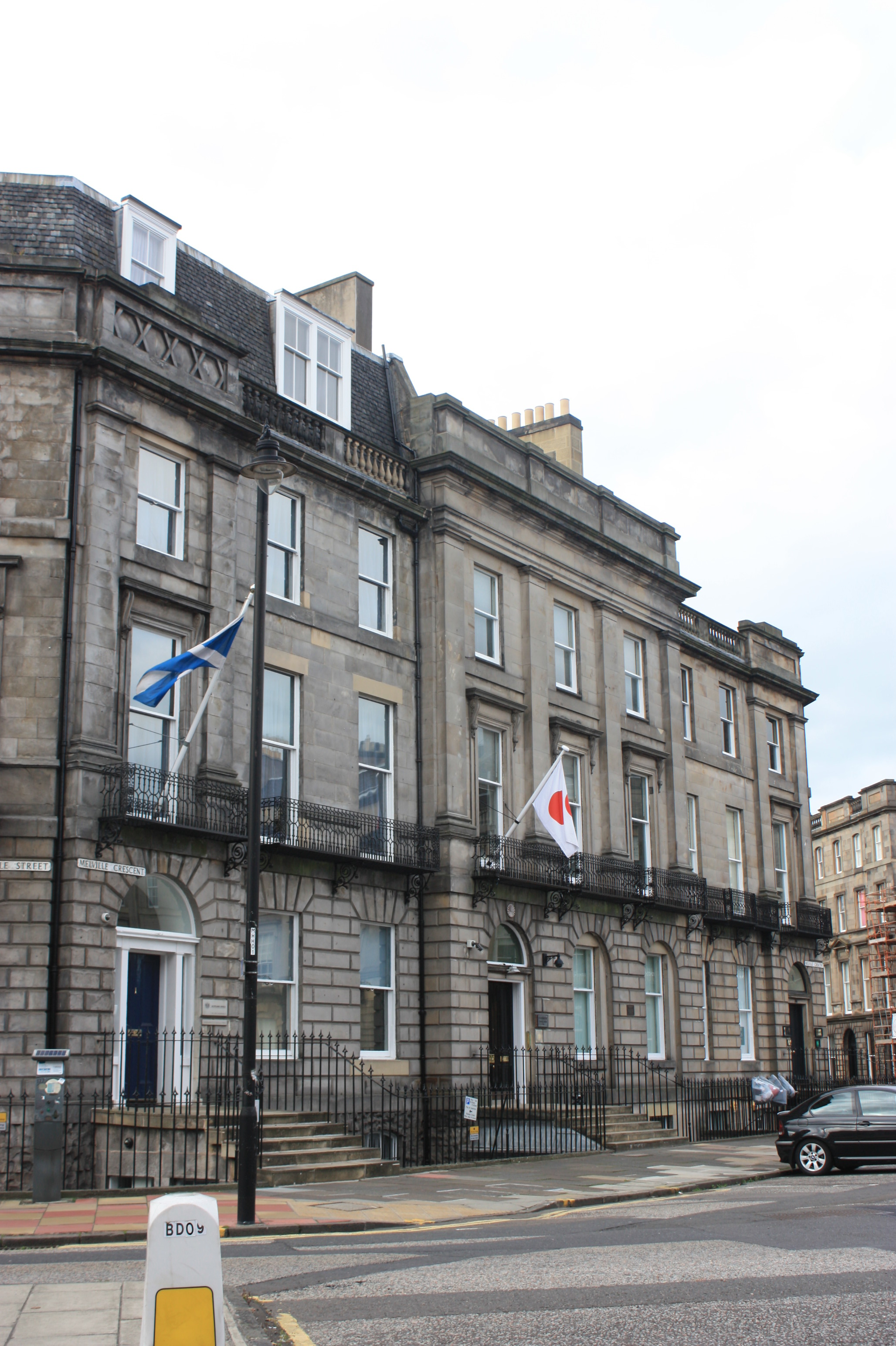
Consulate-General in Edinburgh

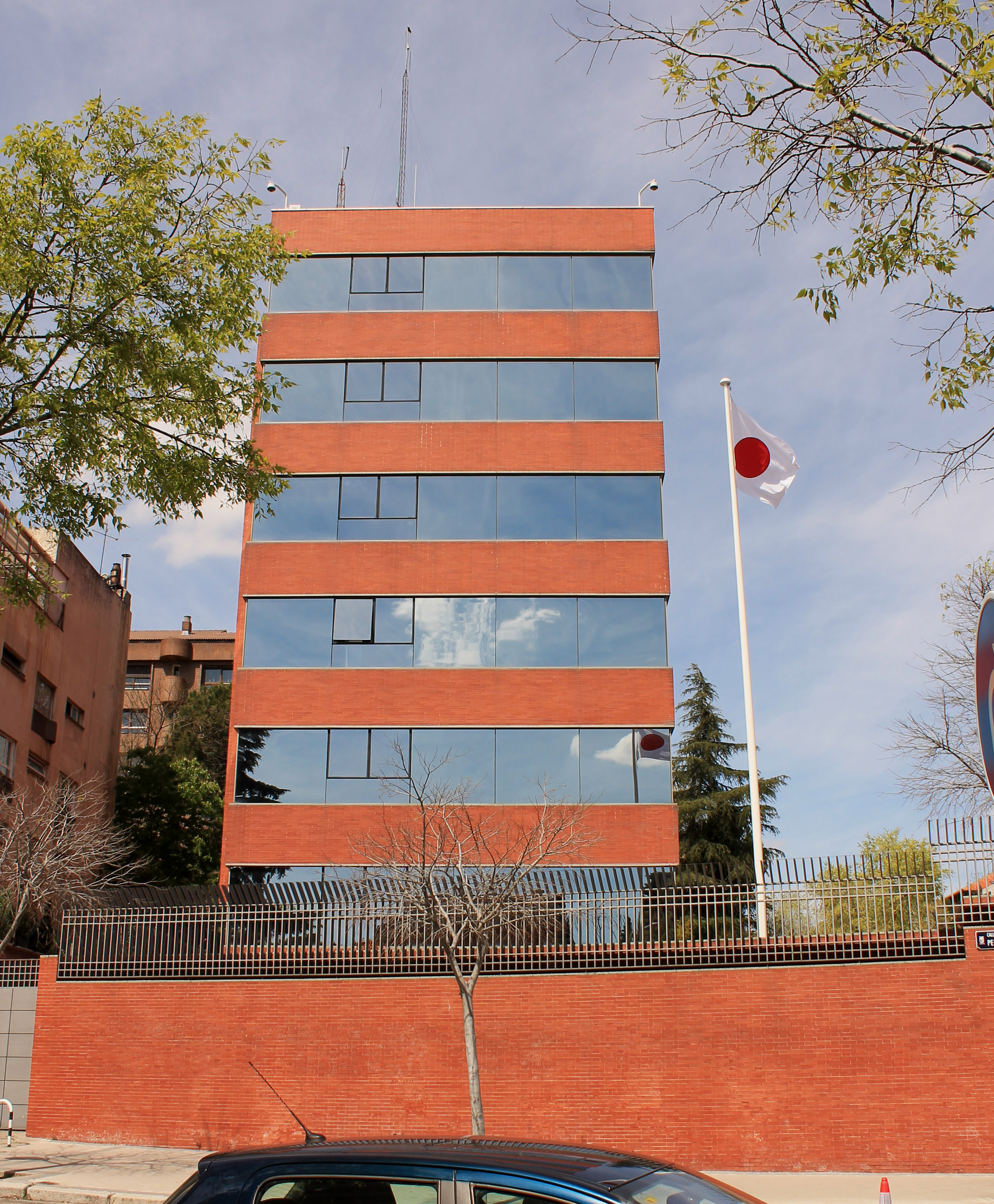
Embassy in Madrid

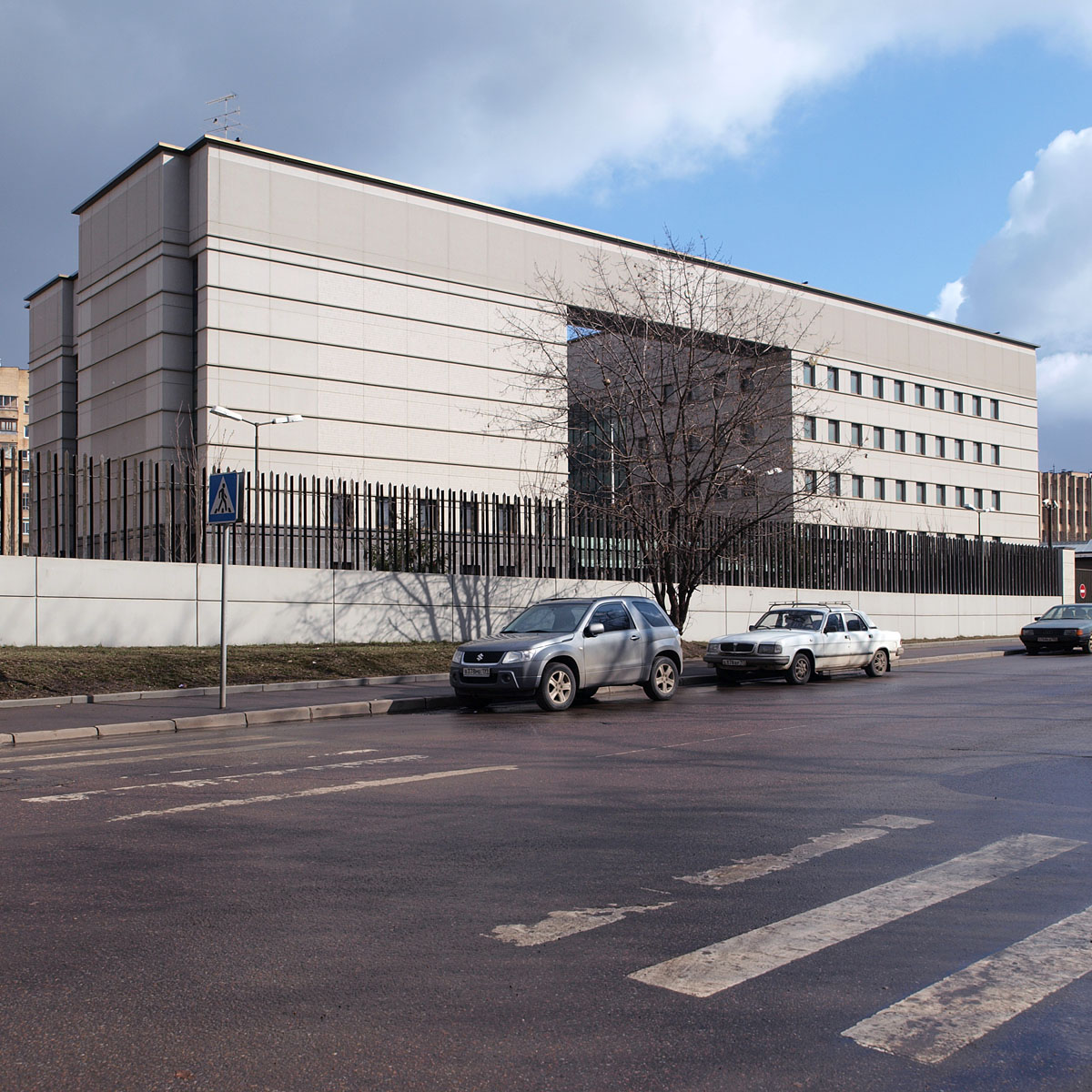
Embassy in Moscow

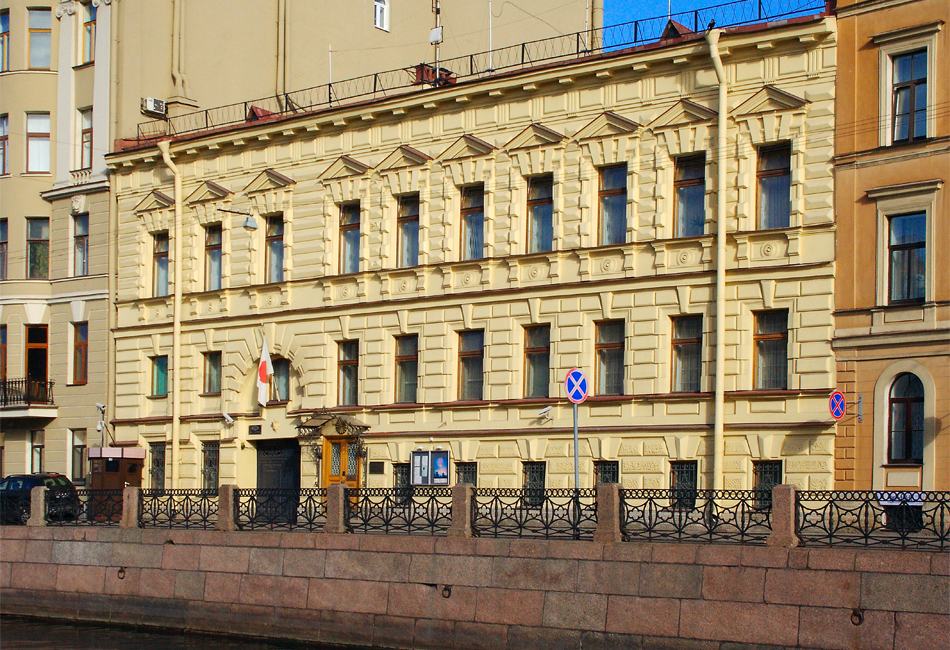
Consulate-General in Saint Petersburg

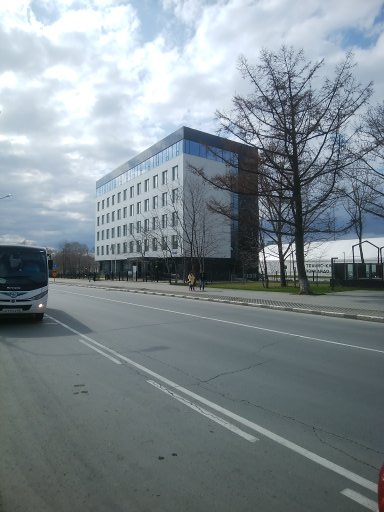
Building hosting the consulate-general in Yuzhno-Sakhalinsk

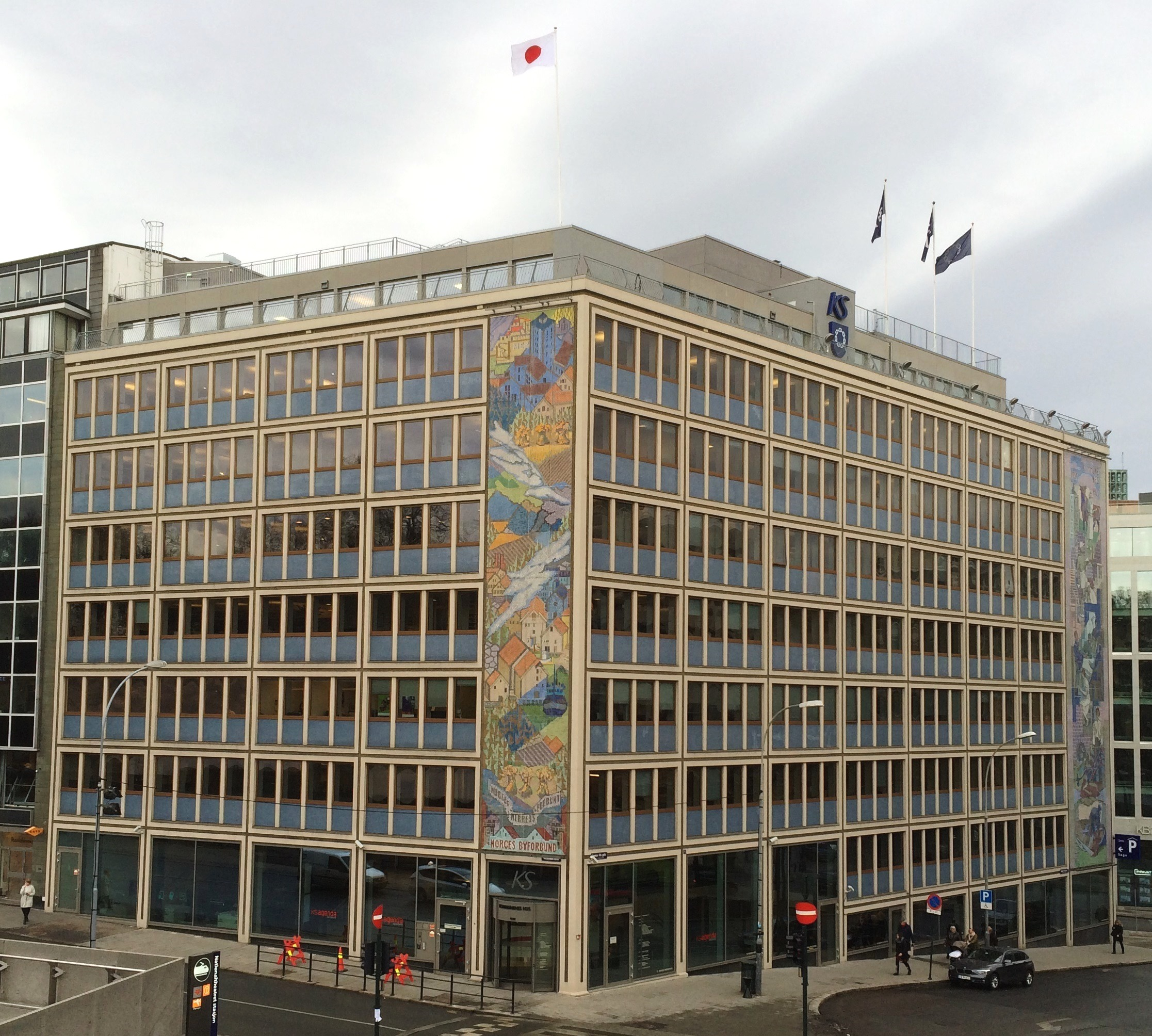
Embassy in Oslo

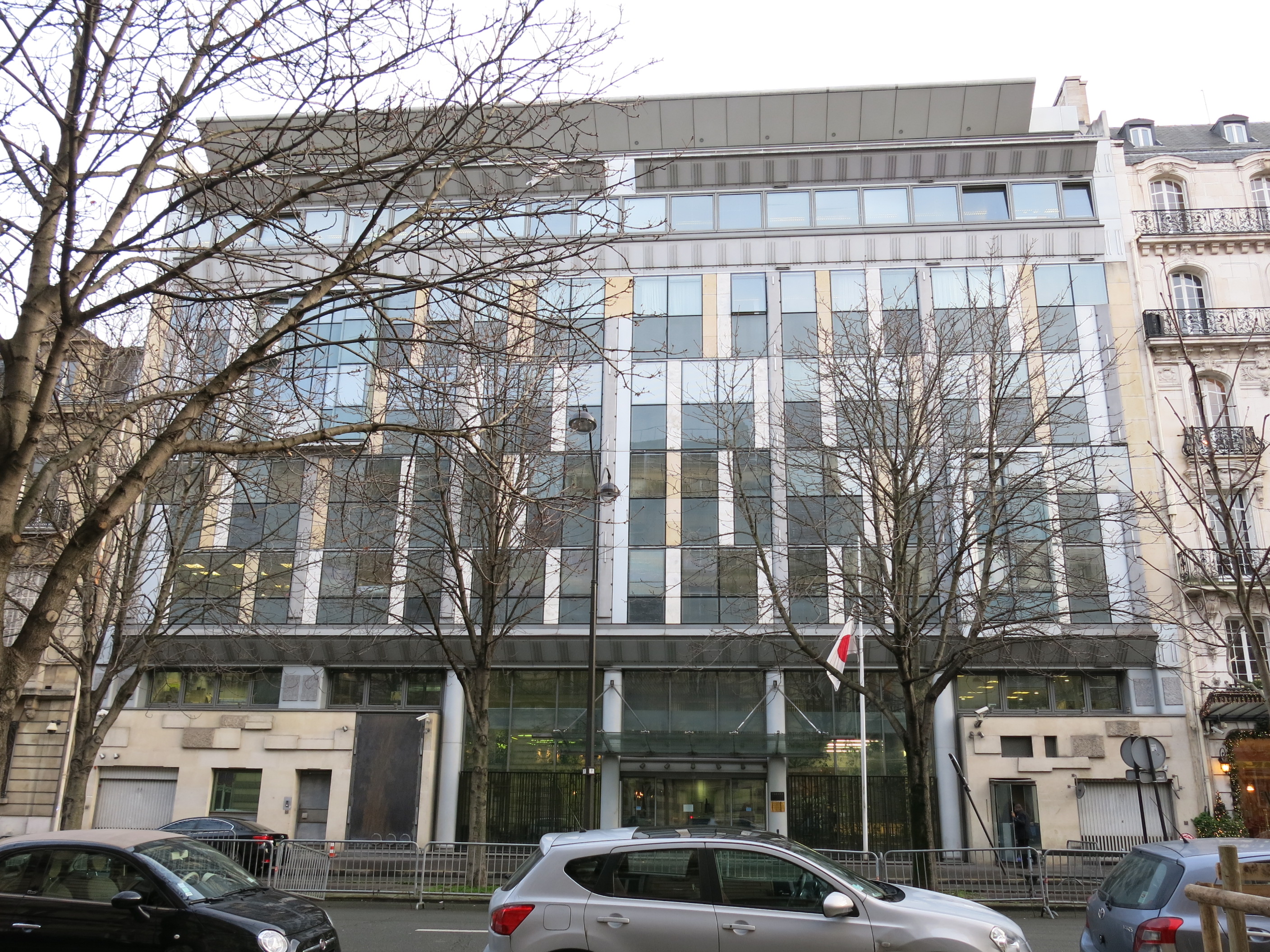
Embassy in Paris

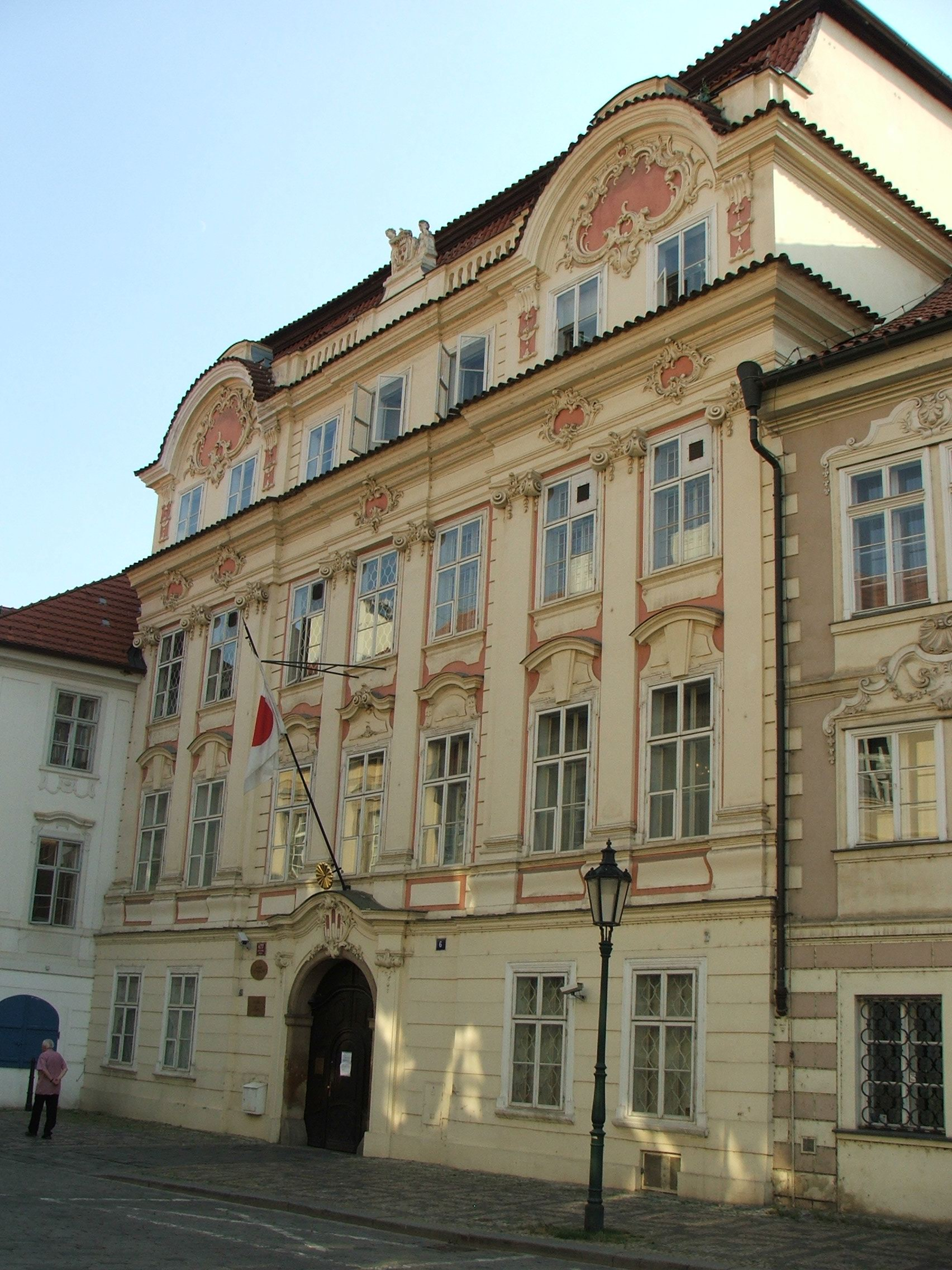
Embassy in Prague

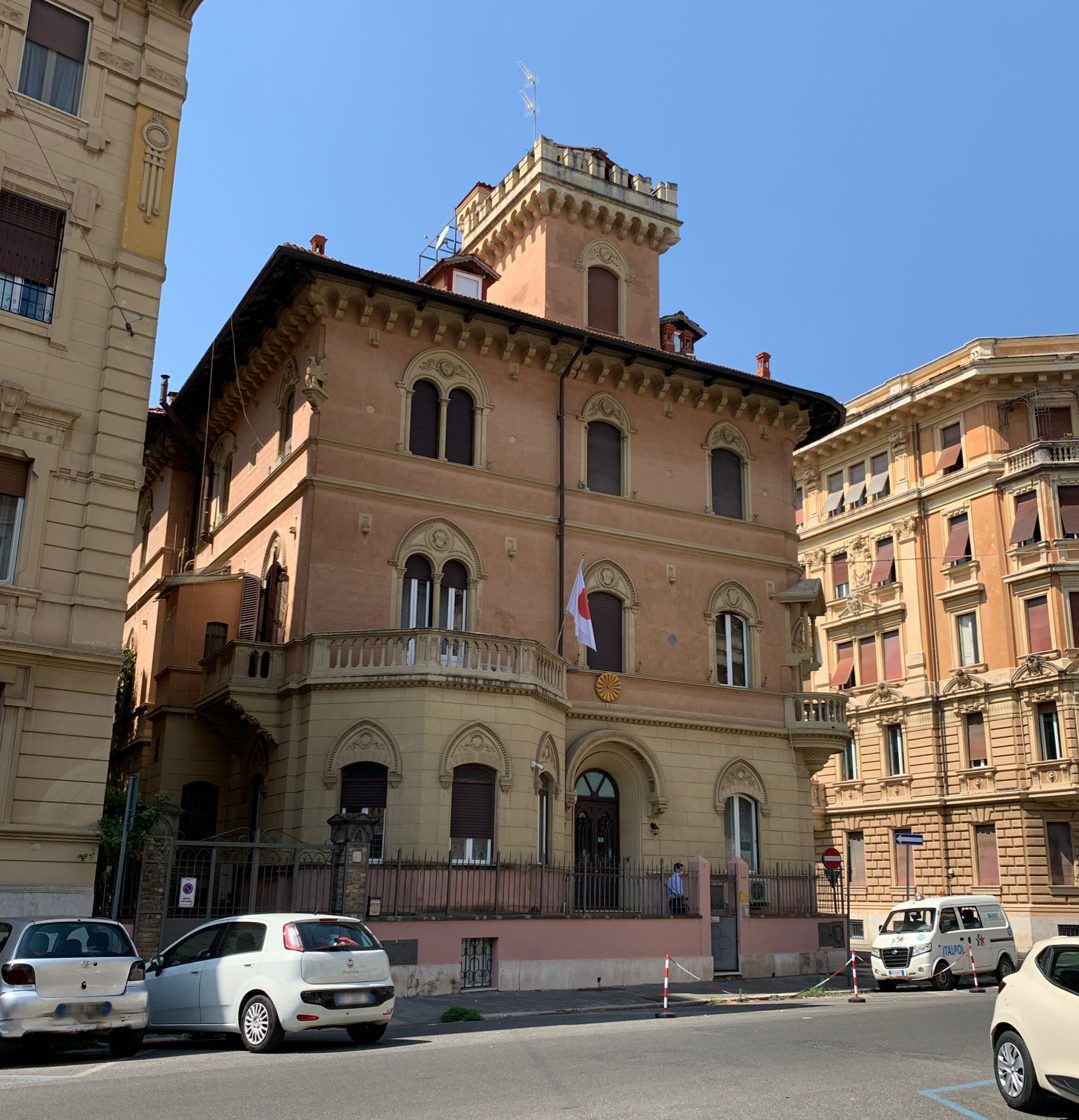
Former Embassy to the Holy See in Rome

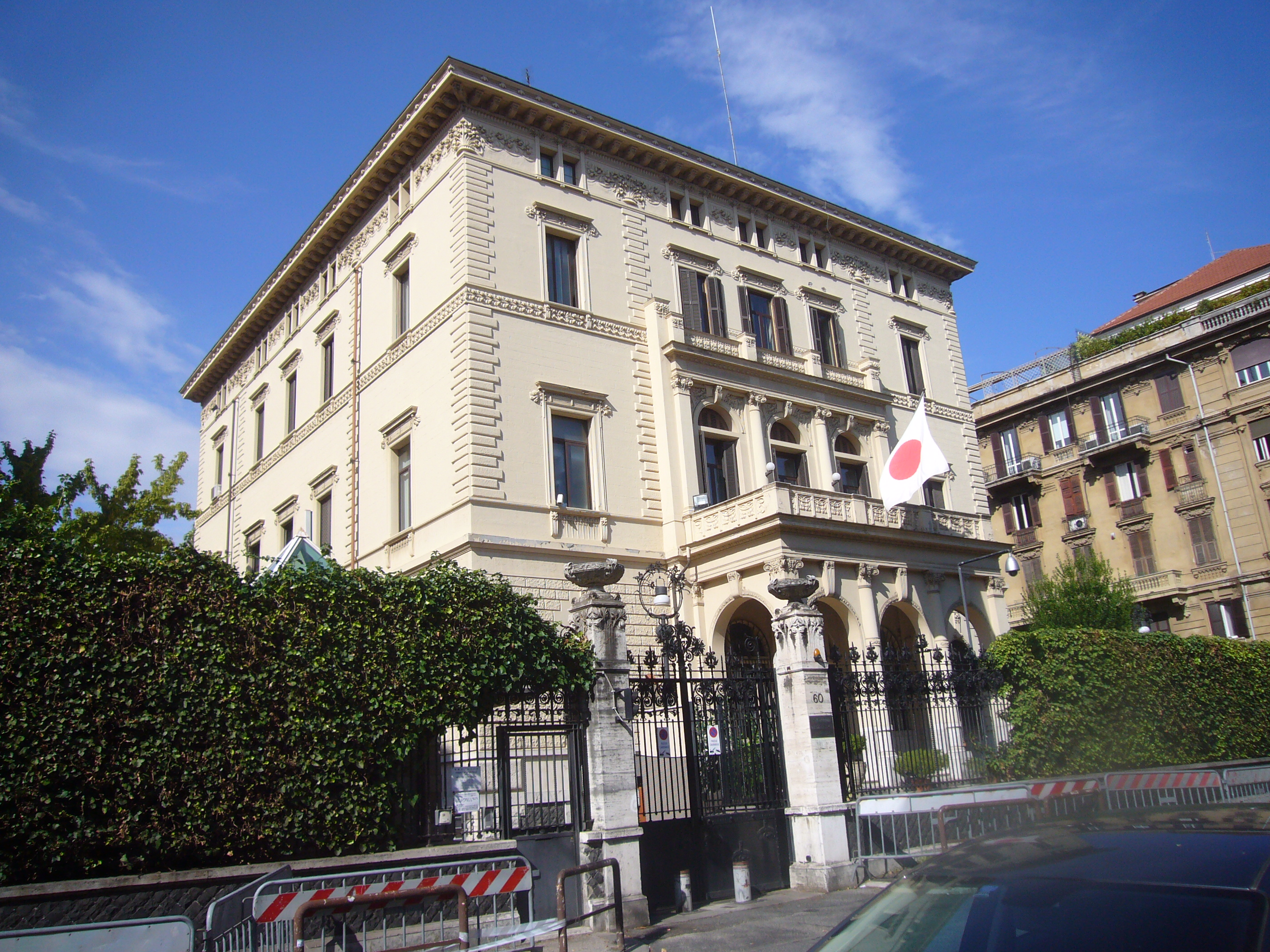
Embassy in Rome

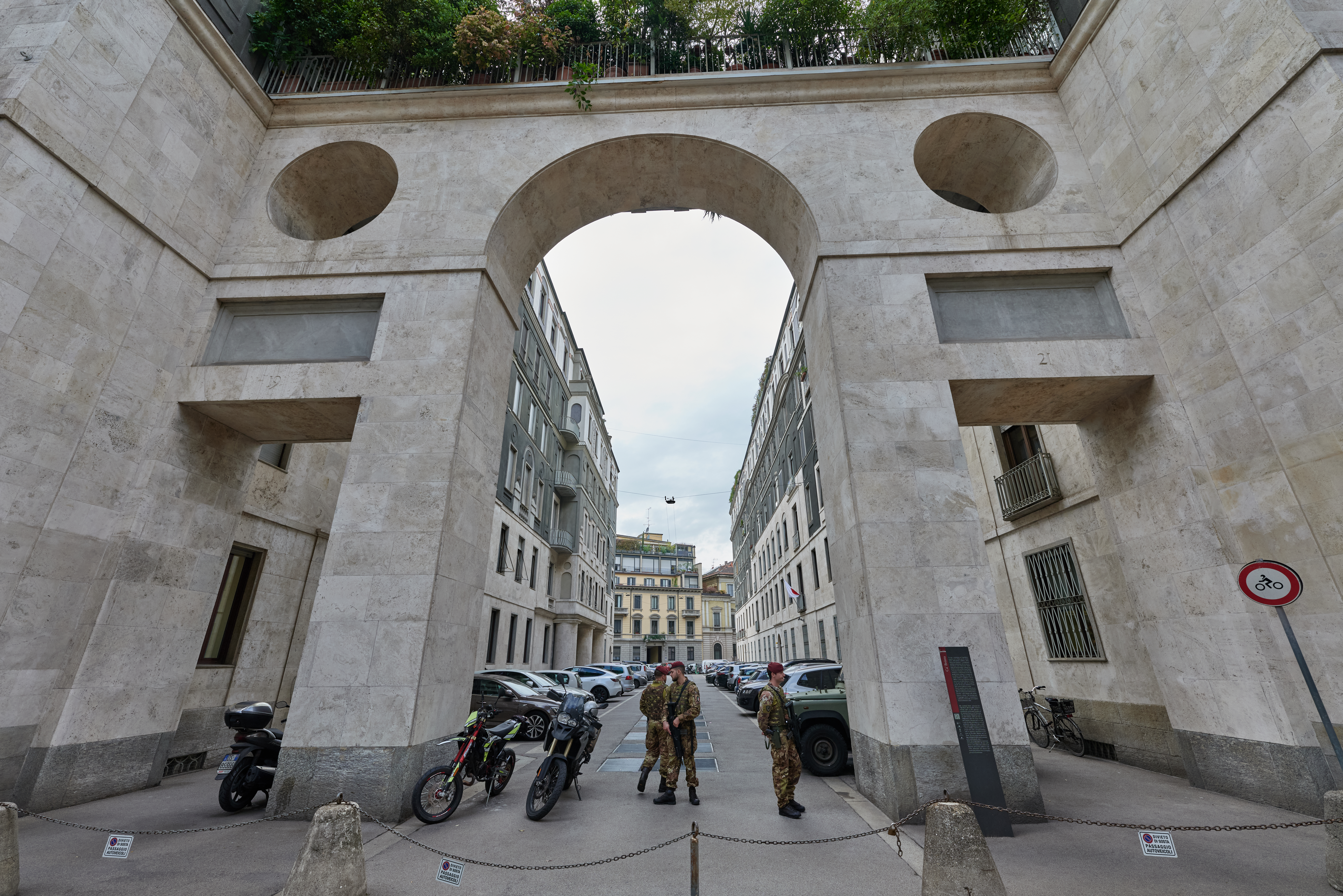
Building hosting the consulate-general in Milan

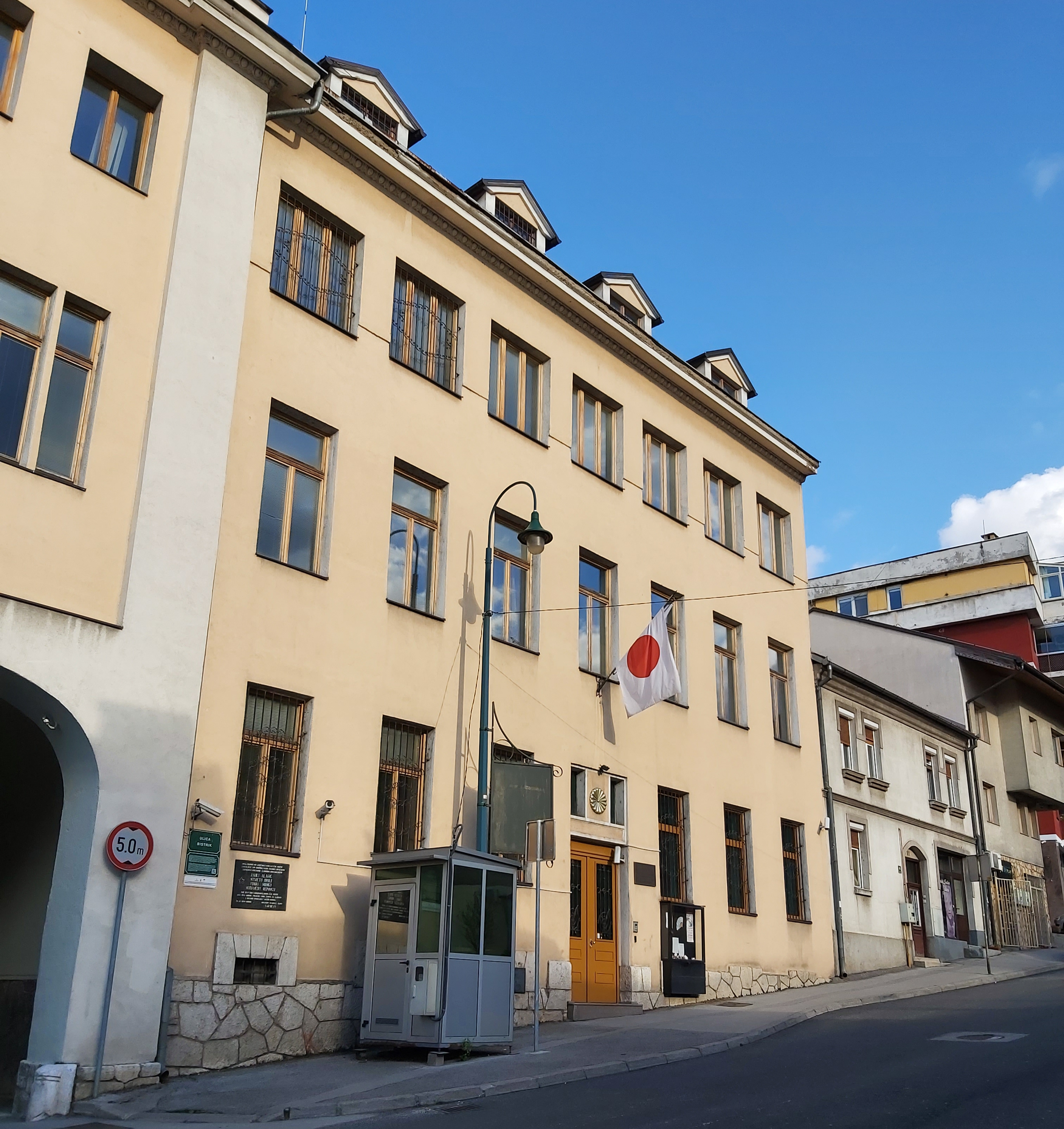
Embassy in Sarajevo

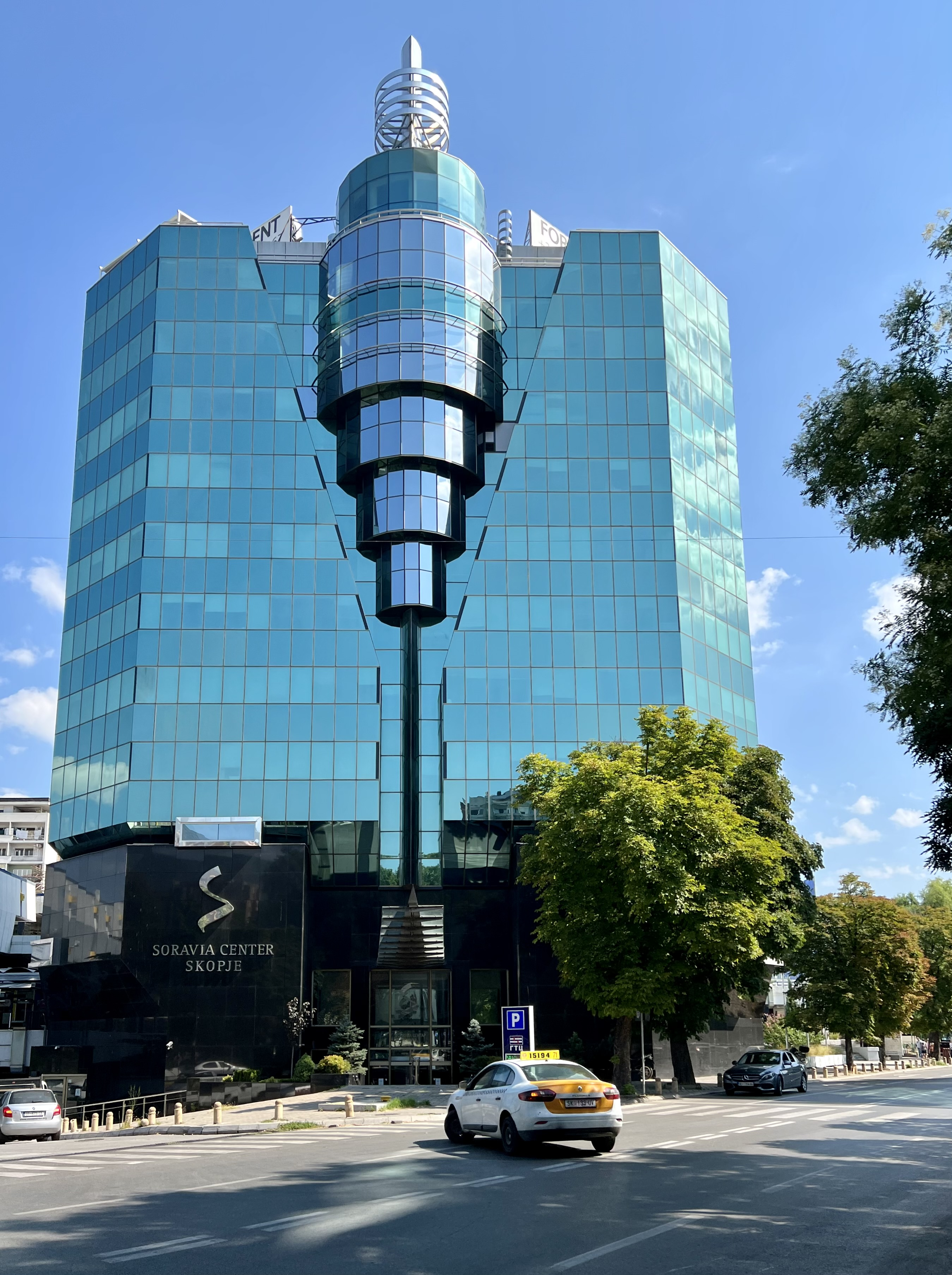
Building hosting the embassy in Skopje

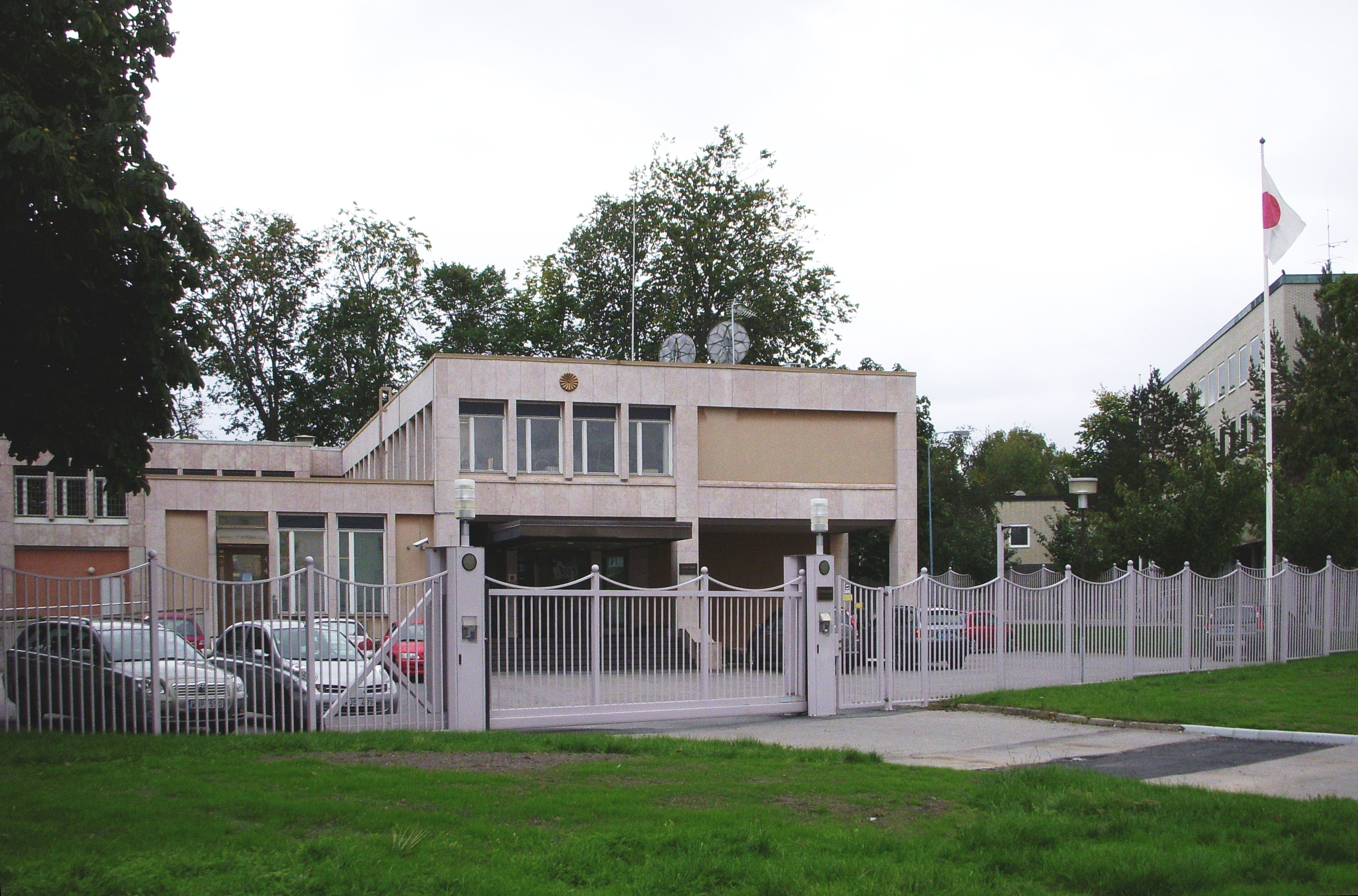
Embassy in Stockholm

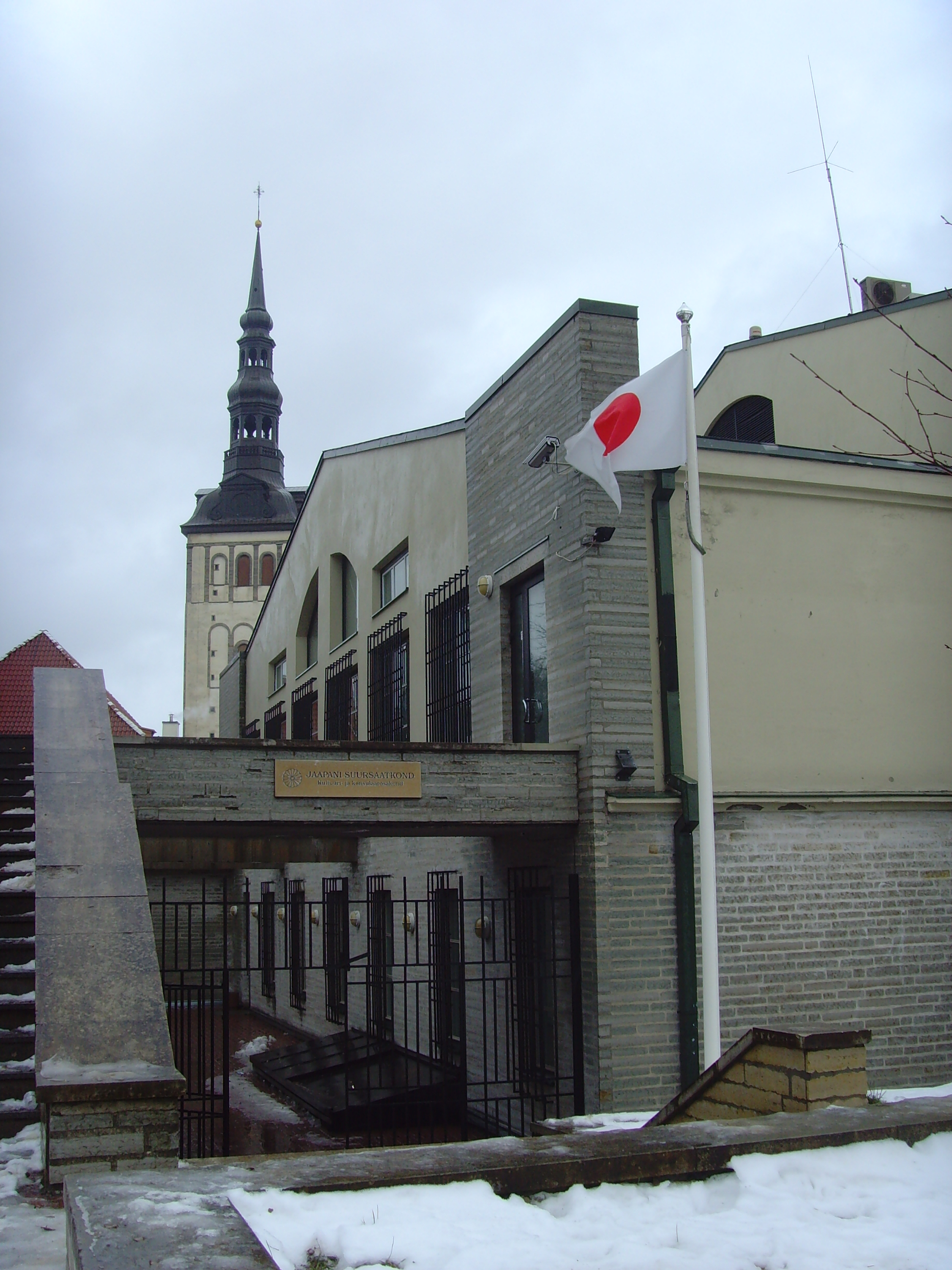
Embassy in Tallinn

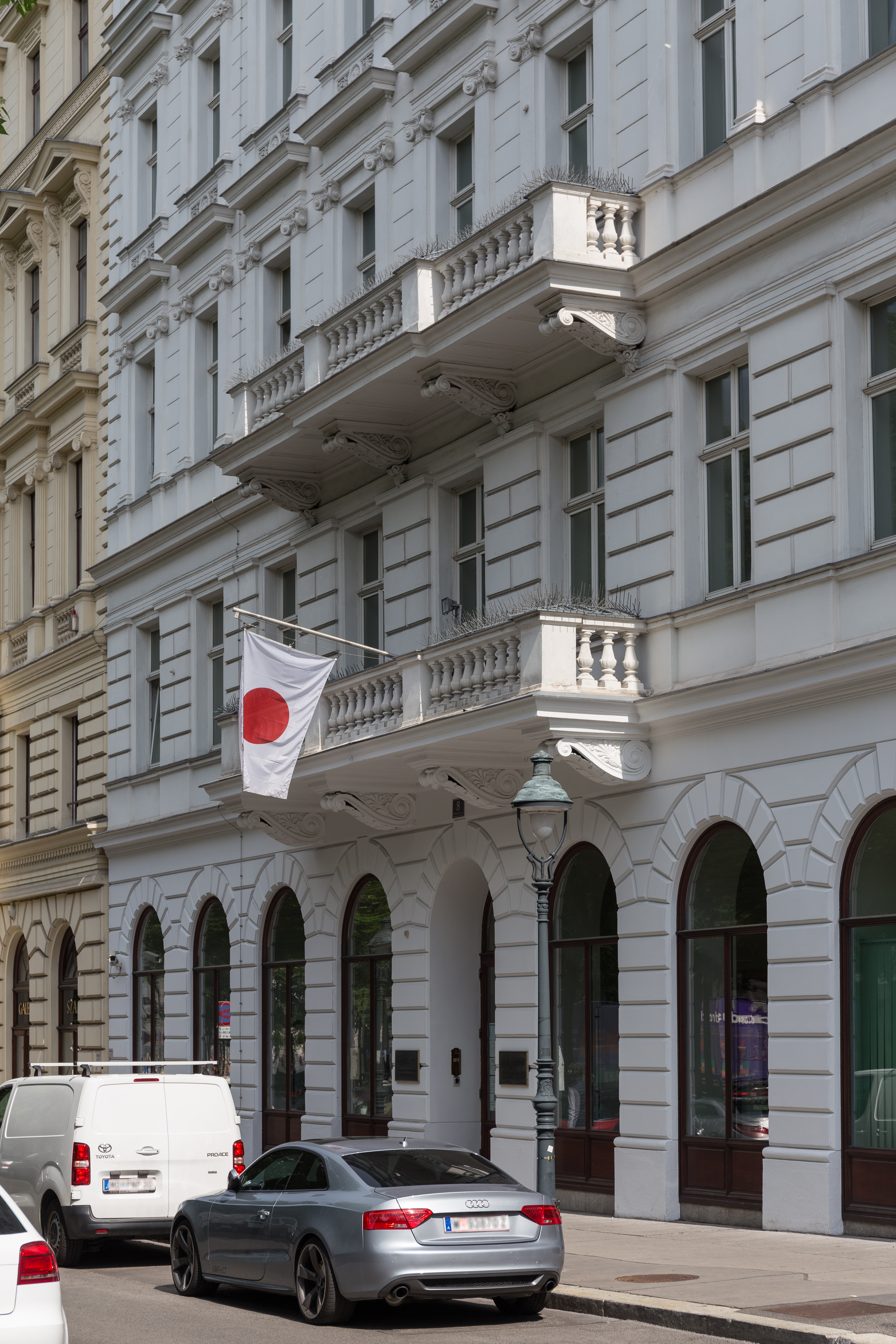
Embassy in Vienna

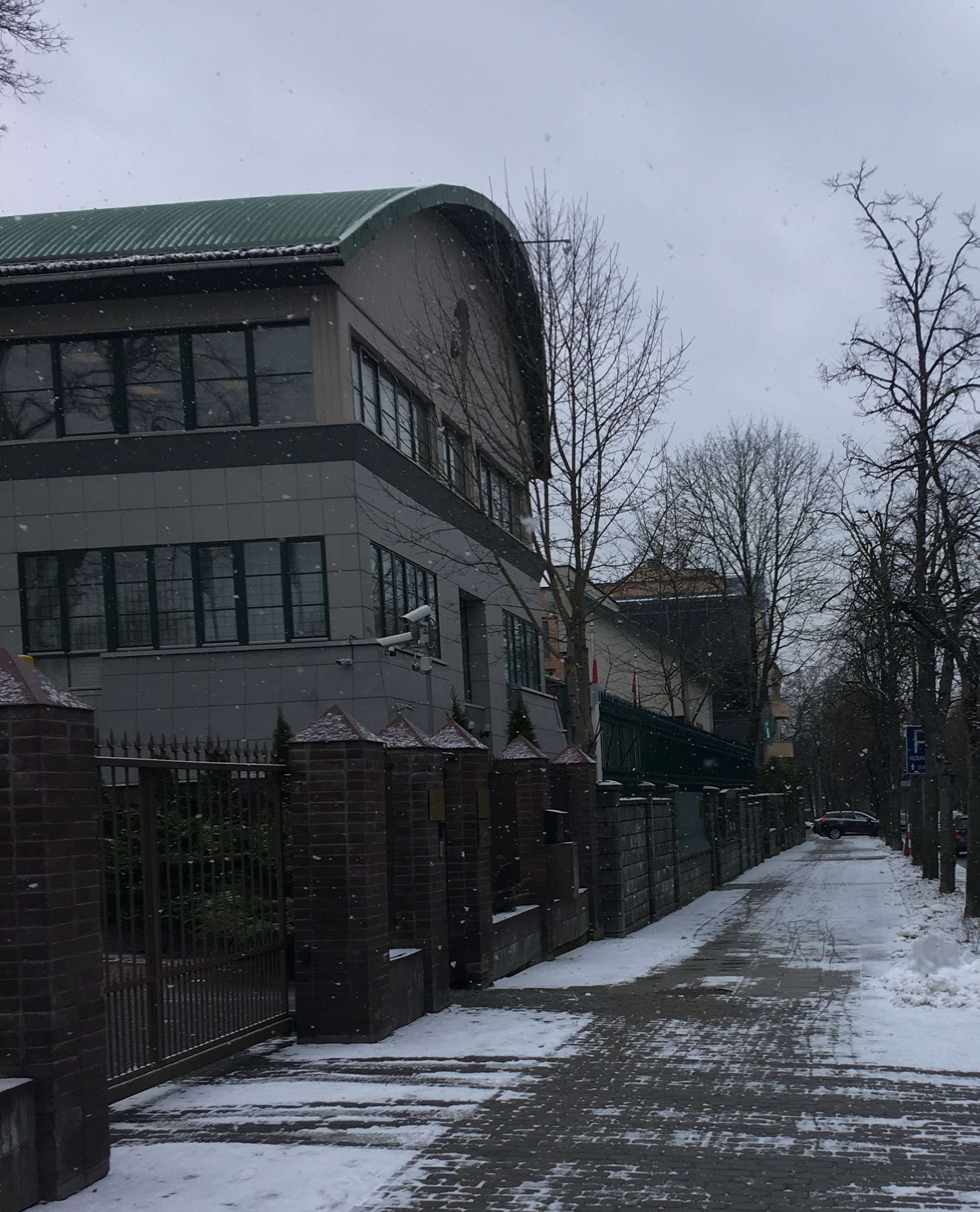
Embassy in Vilnius

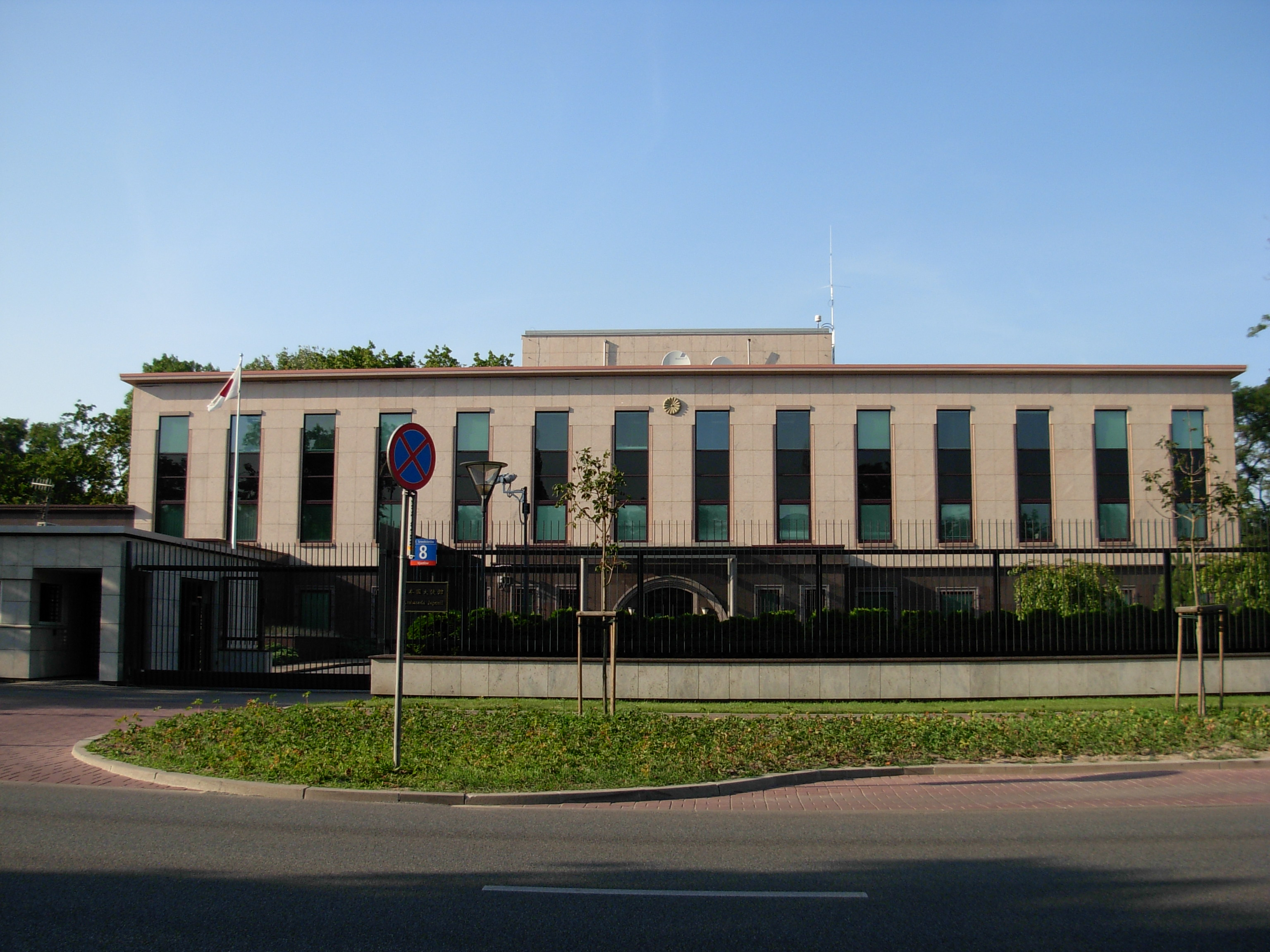
Embassy in Warsaw

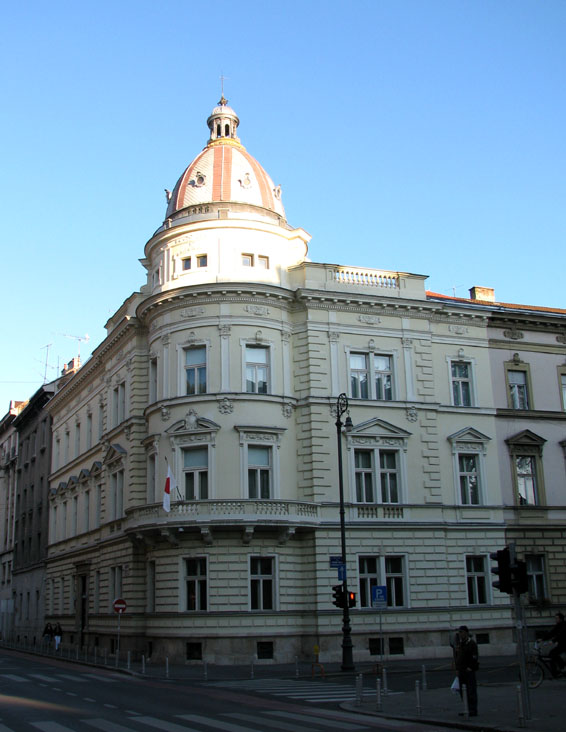
Embassy in Zagreb

=== Oceania ===
Host country	Host city	Mission	Concurrent accreditation	Ref.
Australia	Canberra	Embassy		
Australia	Brisbane	Consulate-General		
Australia	Melbourne	Consulate-General		
Australia	Perth	Consulate-General		
Australia	Sydney	Consulate-General		
Australia	Cairns	Consular office		
Fiji	Suva	Embassy	Countries: Nauru; Tuvalu	
Kiribati	Tarawa	Embassy		
Marshall Islands	Majuro	Embassy		
Micronesia	Kolonia	Embassy		
New Zealand	Wellington	Embassy	Countries: Cook Islands; Niue	
New Zealand	Auckland	Consulate-General	Countries: Cook Islands; Niue	
New Zealand	Christchurch	Consular office	Countries: Cook Islands; Niue	
Palau	Koror	Embassy		
Papua New Guinea	Port Moresby	Embassy		
Samoa	Apia	Embassy		
Solomon Islands	Honiara	Embassy		
Tonga	Nukuʻalofa	Embassy		
Vanuatu	Port Vila	Embassy		

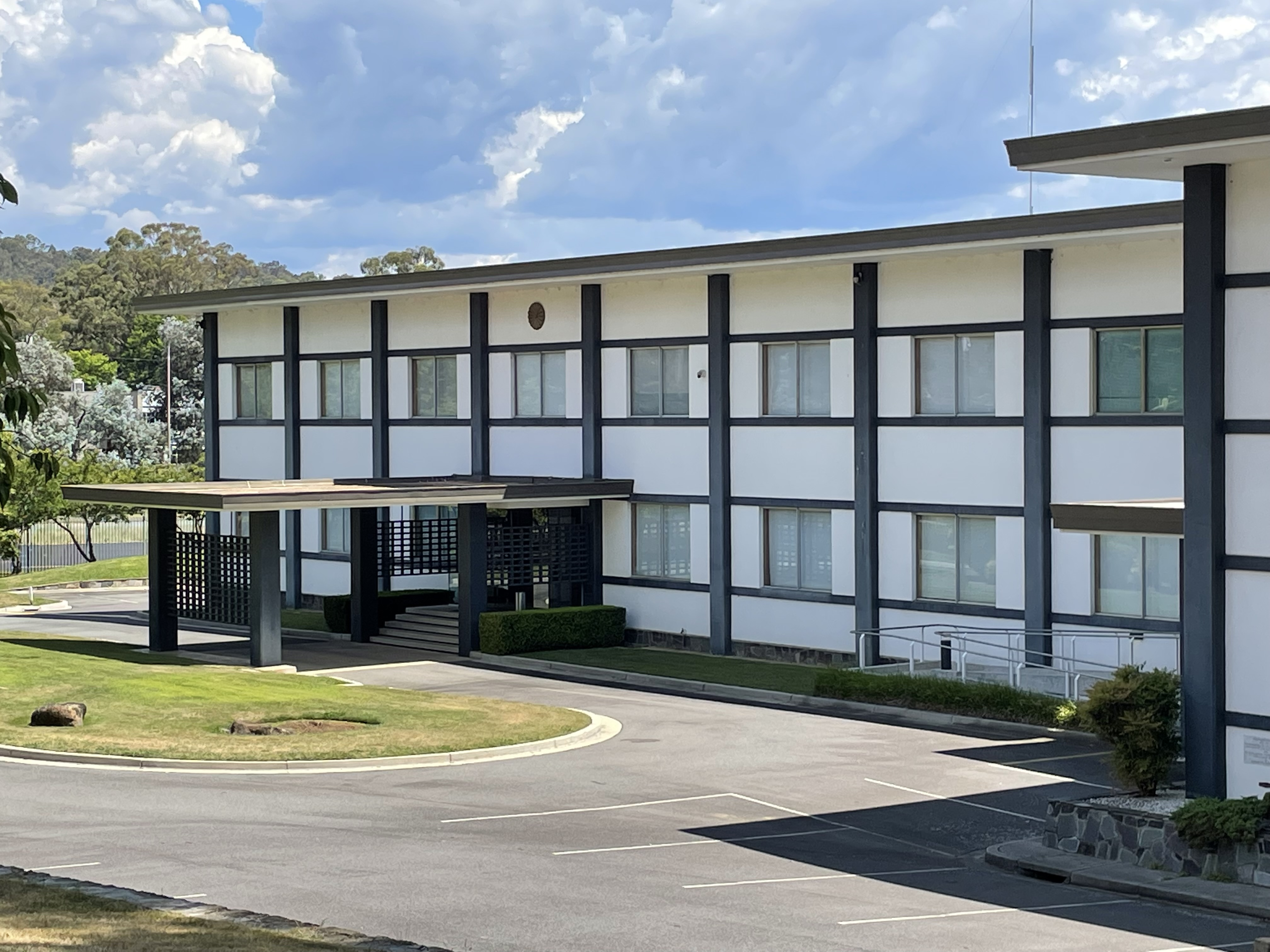
Embassy in Canberra

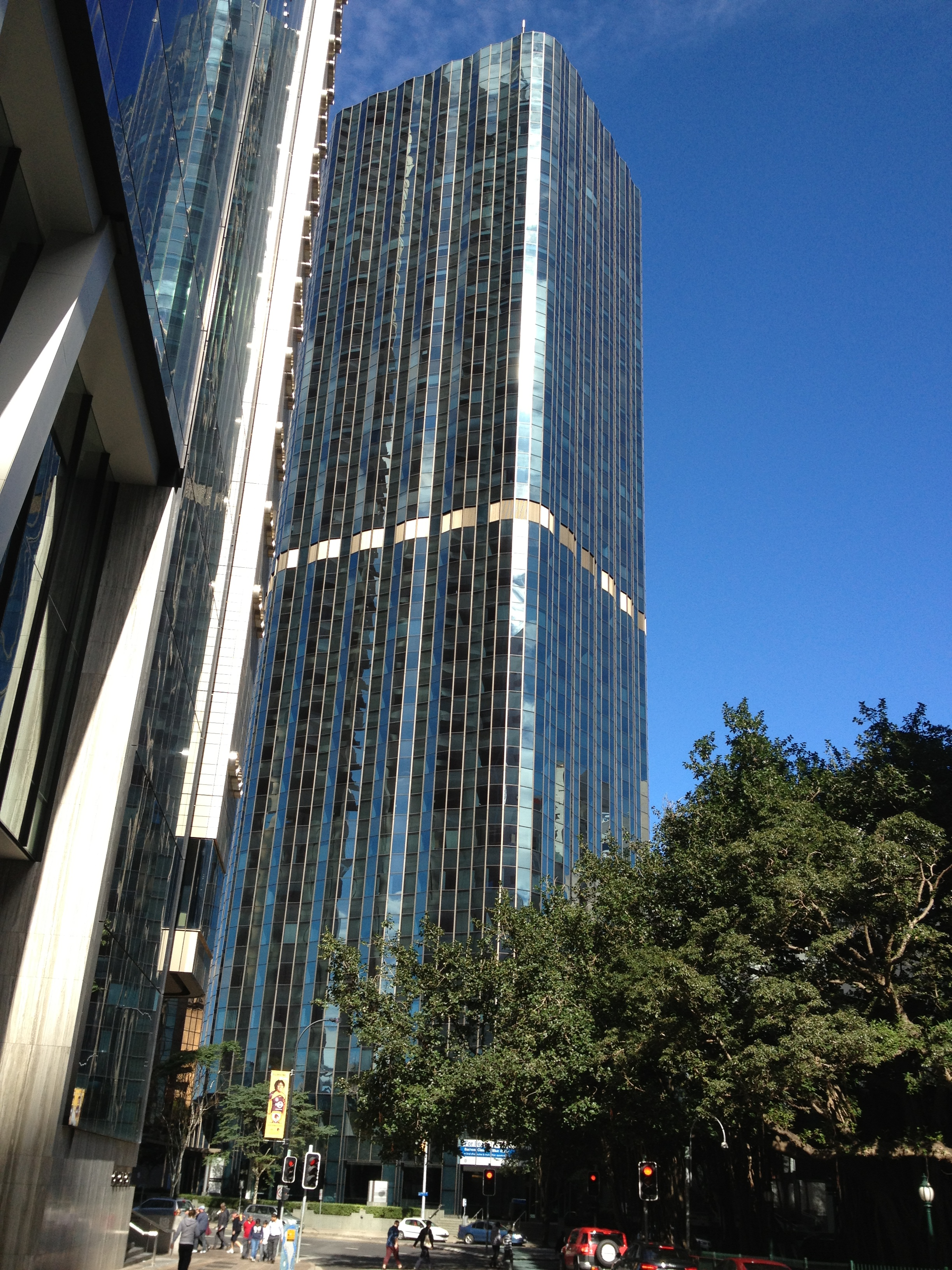
Building hosting the consulate-general in Brisbane

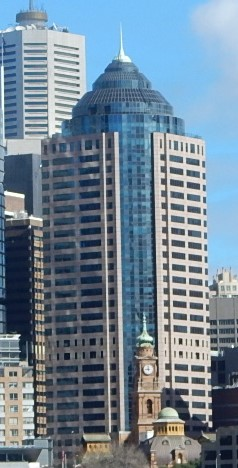
Building hosting the consulate-general in Sydney

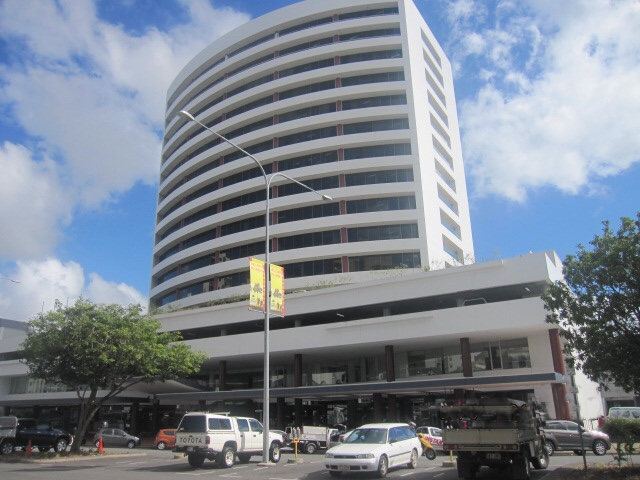
Building hosting the consular office in Cairns

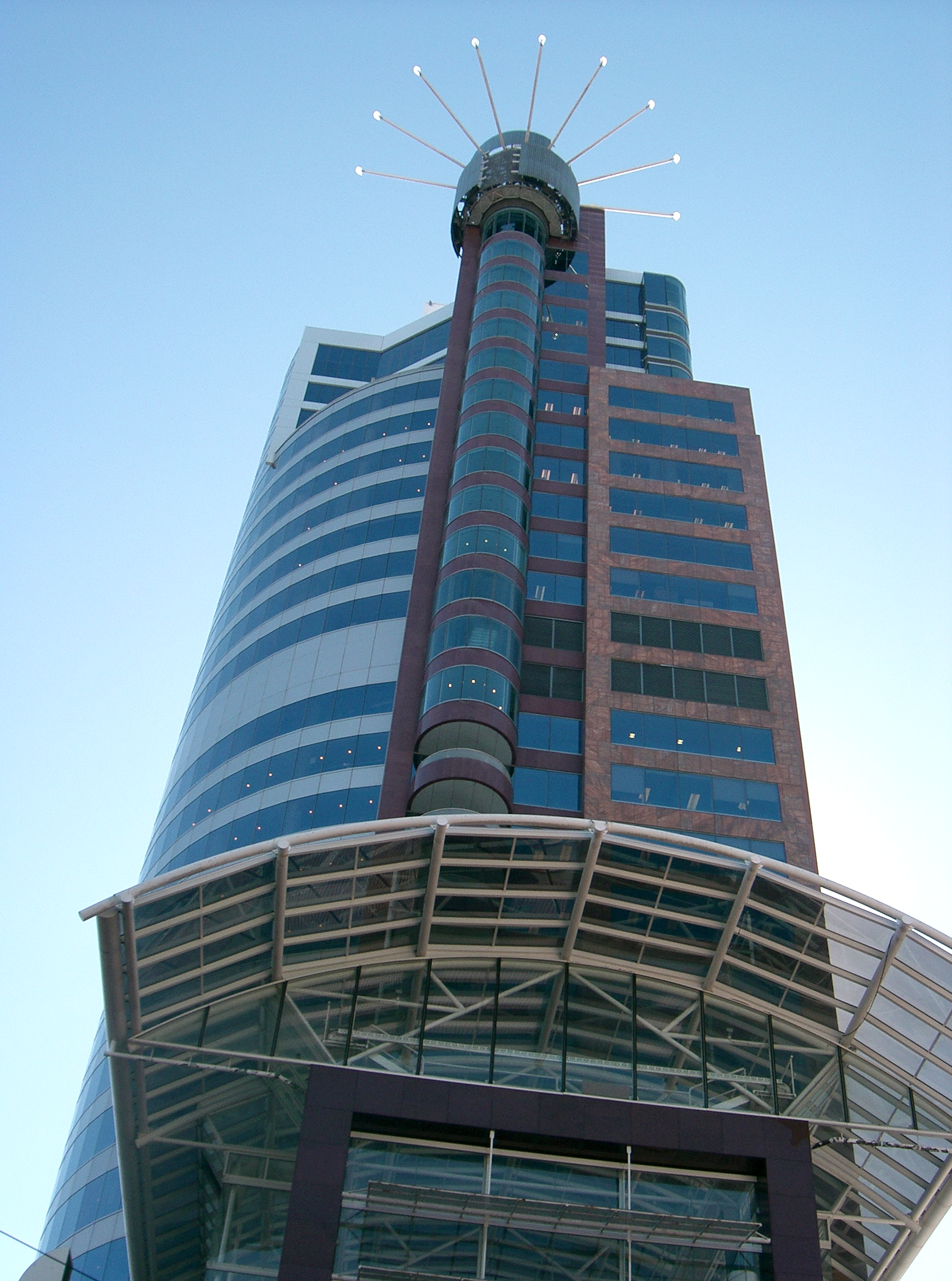
Building hosting the embassy in Wellington

=== Multilateral organisations ===
Organization	Host city	Host country	Mission	Concurrent accreditation	Ref.
African Union	Addis Ababa	Ethiopia	Mission		
Association of Southeast Asian Nations	Jakarta	Indonesia	Mission		
Conference on Disarmament	Geneva	Switzerland	Delegation		
European Union	Brussels	Belgium	Mission		
International Civil Aviation Organization	Montreal	Canada	Delegation		
NATO	Brussels	Belgium	Mission		
OECD	Paris	France	Permanent Delegation		
United Nations	New York City	United States	Permanent Mission		
United Nations	Geneva	Switzerland	Permanent Mission	International Organizations: World Trade Organization	
United Nations	Vienna	Austria	Permanent Mission	International Organizations: International Atomic Energy Agency; UNIDO; United Nations Office on Drugs and Crime	
UNESCO	Paris	France	Permanent Delegation		

== Embassies to open ==
- Montenegro

== Closed missions ==
=== Africa ===
Host country	Host city	Mission	Year closed	Ref.
Central African Republic	Bangui	Embassy	1992	
Egypt	Alexandria	Consular office	2004	
Liberia	Monrovia	Embassy	2004 (Note: Temporarily closed in 1990 due to the outbreak of the First Liberian Civil War, was officially declared closed in 2004.)	
Nigeria	Lagos	Embassy branch office	2007	
Sudan	Khartoum	Embassy	2023	

=== Americas ===
Host country	Host city	Mission	Year closed	Ref.
Canada	Edmonton	Consulate-General	2005	
United States	Kansas City	Consulate-General	2004	
United States	New Orleans	Consulate-General	2008	
United States	Tacoma	Consulate	1901	

=== Asia ===
Host country	Host city	Mission	Year closed	Ref.
Iran	Khorramshahr	Consulate-General	1997 (Note: Temporarily closed in 1981 due to the outbreak of the Iran–Iraq War, was officially declared closed in 1997.)	
Kazakhstan	Almaty	Consular office	2014	
Malaysia	Johor Bahru	Consular office	2014	
Palestine	Gaza City	Representative office (Note: Continues as a representative office in Ramallah.)	2007	
South Vietnam	Saigon	Embassy (Note: Continues as a consulate-general nowadays.)	1976	
South Yemen	Aden	Embassy	Unknown	
Yemen	Sana'a	Embassy (Note: Resident in Riyadh, Saudi Arabia)	2015	
Republic of China	Tianjin	Consulate-General	1946	
Republic of China	Hangzhou	Consular office	1945	

=== Europe ===
Host country	Host city	Mission	Year closed	Ref.
Germany	Bonn	Embassy branch office (Note: Continues as an embassy in Berlin nowadays.)	2002	
Italian Social Republic	Venice	Embassy (Note: Relocated to Rome, Lazio, Italy)	1945 or sooner	
Lithuania (Note: The Baltic states, were occupied and annexed by the Soviet Union from 1940 to 1941, prompting the closure of missions accredited to Lithuania. From 1941 to 1945, the Baltic states were occupied by Nazi Germany, before finally being re-annexed by the Soviet Union after the Second World War.)	Kaunas	Consulate (Note: Continues as an embassy in Vilnius nowadays.)	1940	
Poland	Rzeszów	Embassy liaison office (Note: Continues as an embassy in Warsaw nowadays.)	2023	
Russia	Nakhodka	Consulate-General	1993	

=== Oceania ===
Host country	Host city	Mission	Year closed	Ref.
Australia	Townsville	Consulate	1908	

== See also ==
- Foreign relations of Japan
- List of diplomatic missions in Japan
- Visa policy of Japan
