= Carnegie Library (Atlanta) =

Public library in Georgia, US (1902–1977)

- Carnegie Library of Atlanta
- Formerly listed on the U.S. National Register of Historic Places
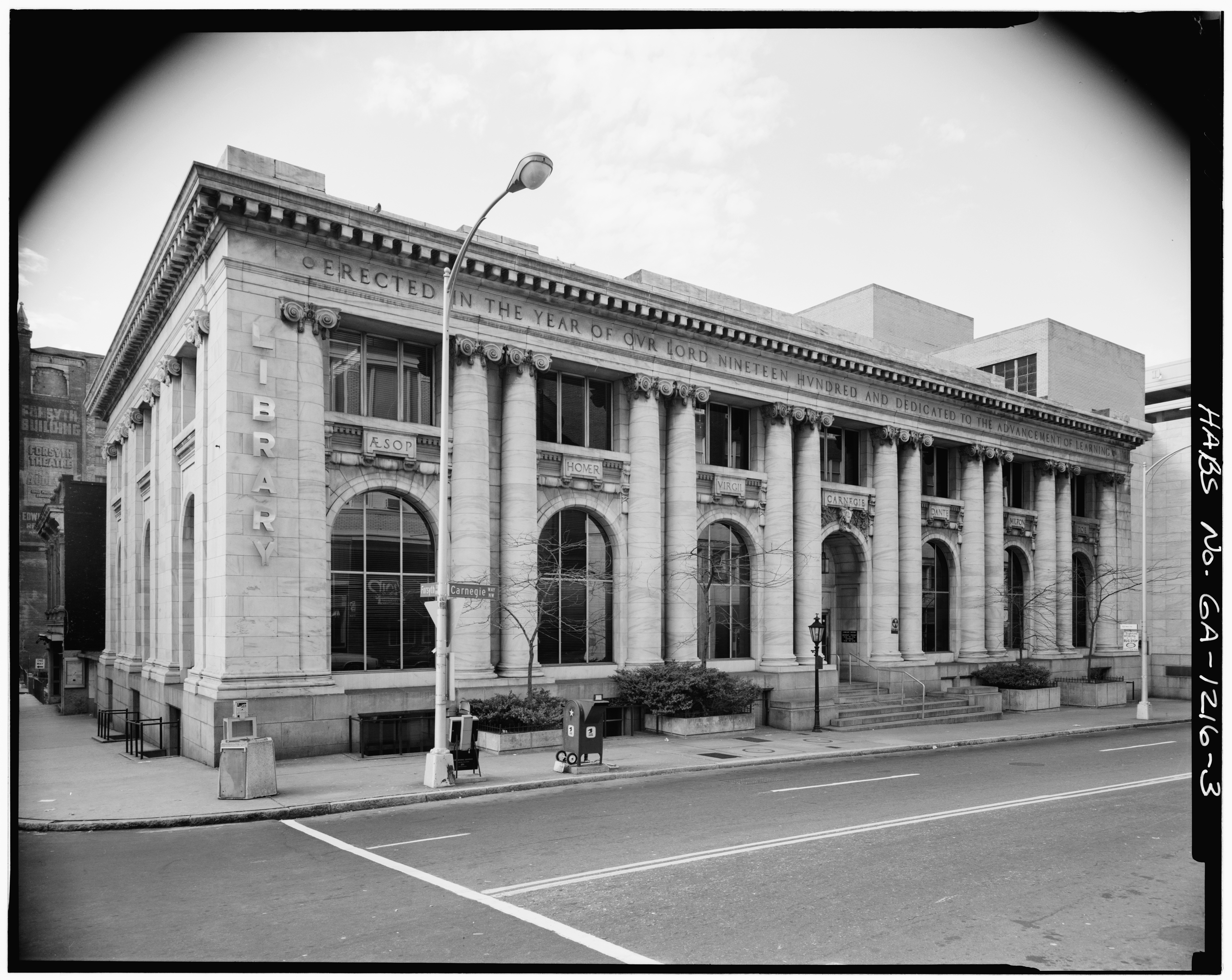
- Carnegie Way elevation of the Carnegie Library building

- Location within Metro Atlanta Location within Georgia Location within the United States
- Location: 126 Carnegie Way, NW, Atlanta, Georgia
- Coordinates: 33°45′28″N 84°23′17″W
- Area: less than one acre
- Built: 1902
- Architect: Ackerman & Ross
- Architectural style: Beaux-Arts
- Demolished: 1977
- NRHP reference No.: 76000624

Significant dates
- Added to NRHP: October 22, 1976
- Removed from NRHP: October 26, 1977

The Carnegie Library (also the Central Library) (Note: Since both the original Central Library and the library system were both once known as the "Carnegie Library of Atlanta", for consistency, this article refers to the building as the Carnegie Library (or Carnegie building), and the library system as the APL.) was the main branch of the Atlanta Public Library (APL) in Downtown Atlanta, Georgia, United States. Located at the intersection of Forsyth Street and Carnegie Way, the two-story building was designed in the Beaux-Arts style by Ackerman & Ross. It was the first public library in Atlanta and was a Carnegie library, built with funds donated by the industrialist Andrew Carnegie. The building was listed on the National Register of Historic Places. It was demolished in 1977 to make way for Marcel Breuer's Atlanta Central Library, located on the same site.

Plans for a central public library in Atlanta were devised following a $145,000 donation from the businessman Andrew Carnegie. The Carnegie Library building opened on March 4, 1902, as the first building of the APL. The building experienced chronic overcrowding issues from the 1920s onward, and it was expanded southward in 1935. The Carnegie Library building was completely renovated in 1950 and again underwent modifications in 1966. The building was proposed for replacement by the 1960s, and Breuer was hired to devise plans for the new branch, construction of which was delayed. The Carnegie Library building was torn down in 1977 to make way for Breuer's building; parts of the Carnegie structure have been preserved.

The building was two stories high, with a slightly raised basement and a rectangular floor plan. The white marble facade was divided vertically into bays, each flanked by columns; the bays contained windows and carvings. The interiors were arranged around a central corridor and staircase. The basement originally contained the children's room, the first floor was used for reading and deliveries, and the second floor had administrative offices and a lecture room. Four floors of stacks were connected by two book lifts.

== History ==
The Fulton County Library System (FCLS; originally the Atlanta Public Library, or APL) is descended from the Young Men's Library Association (YMLA), a subscription library system established in 1867. The YMLA occupied several locations before moving to Marietta Street in 1892. A central public library for Atlanta was suggested in 1897 by Walter M. Kelly, a member of the YMLA's board who argued that the YMLA could not serve Atlanta's growing population. Kelly, a regional manager for the industrialist Andrew Carnegie, had become involved with the YMLA following a request from the association's president Eugene M. Mitchell, the father of writer Margaret Mitchell. In turn, Kelly convinced Carnegie to donate money for a public library in Atlanta. At the time, Carnegie had donated various Carnegie libraries to other American cities.

=== Development ===
==== Founding and Carnegie gifts ====
In February 1899, Carnegie offered Atlanta's government $100,000 for a public library, on the condition that the city government pay for annual maintenance. The Atlanta City Council accepted the gift the next month, and the city government allocated $5,000 annually for maintenance. The YMLA donated its assets to the city for the proposed public library that April, and a board of trustees was established. The library system was formally established on May 6, 1899; the trustees named it the "Carnegie Library of Atlanta" in recognition of Carnegie's gift. The trustees debated where to place the library building, which delayed construction for several months. Ultimately, in September, they sold the YMLA's Marietta Street building and signed a leaseback agreement with the new owners, allowing the collection to remain in the YMLA building for two years.

The trustees bought a new site at the corner of Forsyth and Church streets, the latter of which was renamed Carnegie Way. This site, costing $35,000, consisted of two buildings that spanned a combined 100 by 140 feet (30 by 43 m). Afterward, the trustees launched an architectural design competition in late 1899, with J. H. Dinwiddie as the supervising architect; they invited nine architects and firms to submit plans. Carnegie also donated an additional $25,000 for the library. The New York–based firm Ackerman & Ross won the competition that December, proposing a two-story marble building with a hipped roof. The trustees gave monetary prizes to the runners-up, Willis F. Denny and Walter T. Downing, who both drew Italian Renaissance designs. Carnegie gave a third and final gift of $20,000 in early 1901; this brought his total donation to $145,000.

==== Construction ====
After Ackerman & Ross completed their drawings in early 1900, and the library trustees awarded the building's construction contract that May to the local firm Miles & Bradt for $113,680. The formal groundbreaking ceremony took place on May 15, 1900, and plans for the building were filed with the Atlanta government two days later. When construction began, the collection had 15,000 volumes from the YMHA, which one publication claimed was "only sufficient to fill one corner of" the building. By the middle of that year, the project employed forty workers on average. A cornerstone-laying ceremony for the building took place on September 29; the cornerstone contained a time capsule with newspaper articles, documents, and other artifacts relating to the library. The sculptor Philip Martiny was hired to design the decorations on the Carnegie Library building's facade.

The trustees awarded contracts for the building's stacks and furniture in February 1901, but construction was delayed due to challenges in obtaining white marble that was not stained with dark veins. The planned opening was delayed multiple times. The contractors began paying a daily penalty after missing an initial deadline of April 1, and the City Council threatened to withdraw its $5,000 annual appropriation. That September, the library system moved its collection into the building's basement, as the stacks and furniture on the upper stories had not yet been installed. At the time, the collection had 20,000 volumes, and the library had received donations from various historical societies and private connections. A stained glass window was installed the next month. In January 1902, the contractors turned over the basement to the library trustees. The trustees initially rejected the two above-ground stories because of poor workmanship; the floor surfaces were replaced, causing further delays.

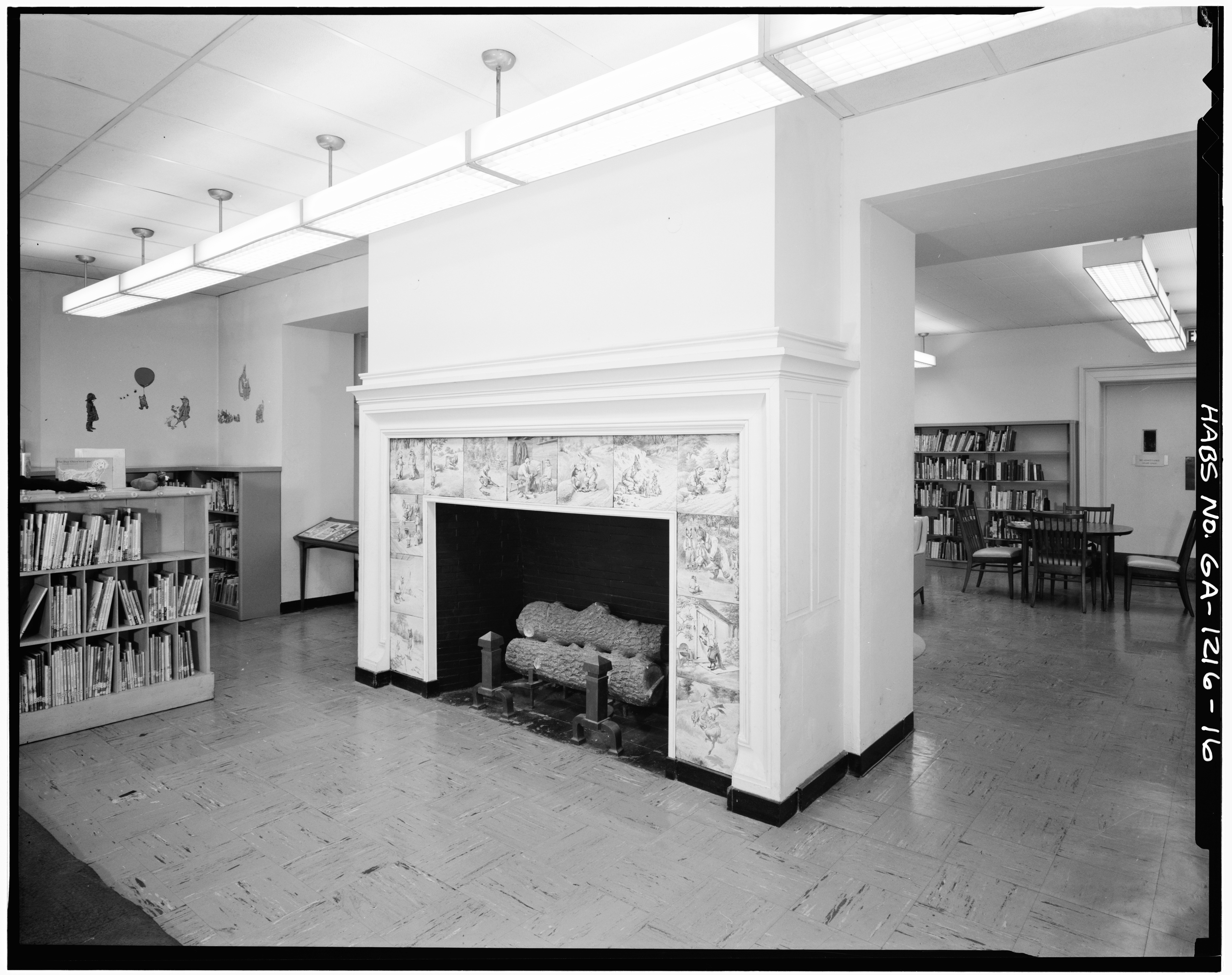
The basement reading room, looking toward fireplace mantel. This was the first part of the library to be opened.

In conjunction with the opening of the Carnegie Library building, four apprentices were hired to prepare the collection for public use. Books were placed on shelves during late February 1902, and the building opened on March 4, 1902. Only the stacks and children's room in the basement were completed upon opening; patrons had to use a rear entrance, and a temporary book-delivery room was set up in the basement. The library gained 1,000 cardholders within three days of the building's opening and 7,000 in its first month. The building was ultimately completed on May 29, 1902; the structure cost $125,000 in total, while the furniture cost $20,000. Miles & Bradt sued the library trustees in October 1902 over unpaid bills relating to the building's construction, but a city judge ruled against them.

=== Usage ===
The APL's central branch was housed in the Carnegie Library building for most of the century, although only a small part of the original design remained intact over the years. It was the APL's only location until the first branch opened in 1909, and the system itself was also formally known as the Carnegie Library of Atlanta until 1949. Due to racial segregation, the building initially served only white patrons; the Auburn Avenue Library, which was built later in 1921, served Atlanta's black residents. In its early years, the Carnegie Library building hosted notable guests such as Carnegie, Chinese diplomat Wu Ting-fang, and authors including Henry Seidel Canby, Frank Swinnerton, and Richard Halliburton. Over time, the city's annual appropriation for the library increased as the APL opened more branches.

==== 1900s to 1920s ====
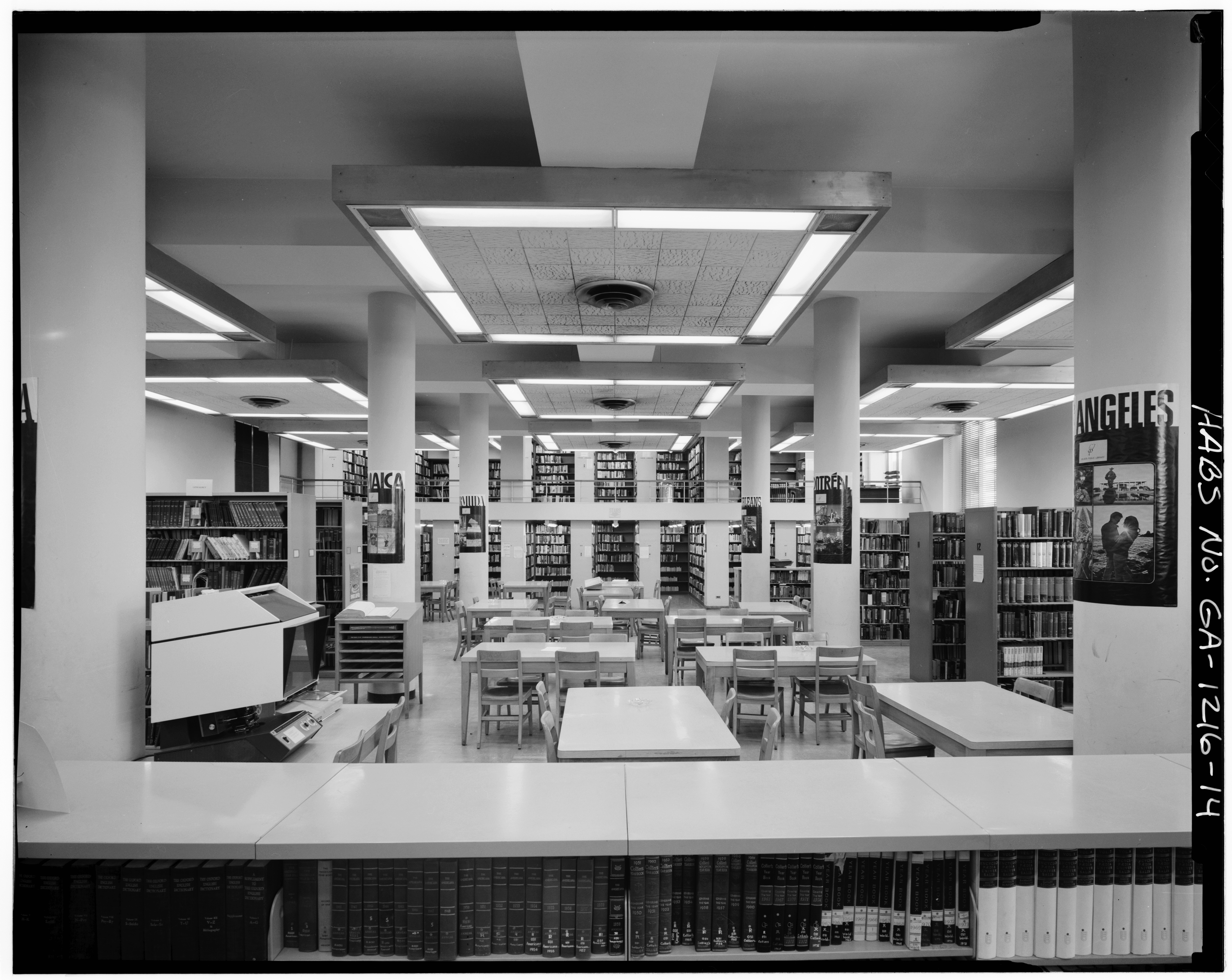
Interior of the first floor

The APL's first main librarian, Anne Wallace, proposed in 1903 that an adjacent lot be converted to a small park for the library. The next year, a periodical reading room opened on the building's first floor, and a bust of Carnegie was dedicated in the building. Wallace also began hiring librarian apprentices, who worked at the Carnegie Library before moving on to other institutions. In 1905, she requested additional money from Carnegie for the establishment of a librarians' training school. Originally known as the Southern Library School, the training school opened at the Carnegie Library building that September; it later became the Carnegie Library Training School of Atlanta. By 1907, the library had 40,000 volumes, and the building had begun hosting programs for blind patrons. The building's facade was first cleaned in 1911, and the APL also proposed book-delivery stations across Atlanta to reduce the need for patrons to visit the Central Library.

The central branch had 60,000 volumes by the early 1910s, a figure that grew to nearly 84,000 later that decade. The Central Library remained the APL's busiest branch in the early 1920s, with roughly two-thirds of the system's circulation. Upon the system's 25th anniversary, in November 1924, the architectural firm of Hentz, Reid & Adler drew up plans for a third story. APL librarian Tommie Dora Barker endorsed the expansion, which did not occur. The APL again wanted to expand the Carnegie Library building by mid-1928, and a city councilmember proposed $190,000 for a new third story and a southward annex through a bond issue. G. Lloyd Preacher drew up sketches for the 1928 proposal. By then, the Carnegie Library building was significantly over capacity, with 100,000 books and archives of 240 magazines and 38 newspapers. There was no space in the building for the Carnegie Library Training School to expand, jeopardizing that institution's eligibility for grants, and parts of the collection were moved to the closed stacks or to branch libraries. Some reading-room tables also had to be removed due to the space constraints.

==== 1930s to early 1950s: Expansions ====
The training school relocated to Emory University in 1930; by then, the APL was seeking funds to expand the stacks, and the circulation department had to close for two hours per day due to overcrowding. In 1932, to speed up the checkout process, the APL rearranged the interiors and began allowing patrons to check out their own books. The APL requested $200,000 in city funds the next year, which would have paid for expansions and new bookshelves. Ultimately, the city government gave $3,000 for the southern annex, while the federal government contributed the rest; sources disagree on the cost. (Note: Different sources give the cost as $60,000, $65,000, or $70,000.) Federal Emergency Relief Administration (FERA) workers began construction in November 1934. The annex was named after the APL's librarian at the time, Jessie Hopkins, and was completed in November 1935 to coincide with Andrew Carnegie's 100th birthday. With space for another 75,000 volumes, the Hopkins annex included an enlarged children's department and periodical room, a new reading room, and additional newspaper stacks.

The APL trustees unsuccessfully requested a further $125,000 for the third floor in 1935 and again in 1938. Additionally, a plaque honoring the philanthropist Harriet Harwell Wilson High was dedicated in the children's room in 1939 following a donation from the High estate. The building continued to be overcrowded and understaffed. APL librarian Fanny Hinton proposed constructing a new central branch for $2 million in the APL's 1946 annual report. An advisory group proposed in April that $1.7 million for the APL (including $1.5 million for a central branch) be included in a referendum for a proposed bond issue, which was approved by voters that August. The APL hired the library expert Joseph L. Wheeler in early 1947 to study the feasibility of relocating the central branch or replacing the Carnegie Library building. Wheeler's report, published that June, recommended demolishing the Carnegie structure and erecting a replacement building several times as large. Subsequently, both Hinton and the chairman of APL's board of trustees requested $1.7 million from the approved bond issue in early 1948.

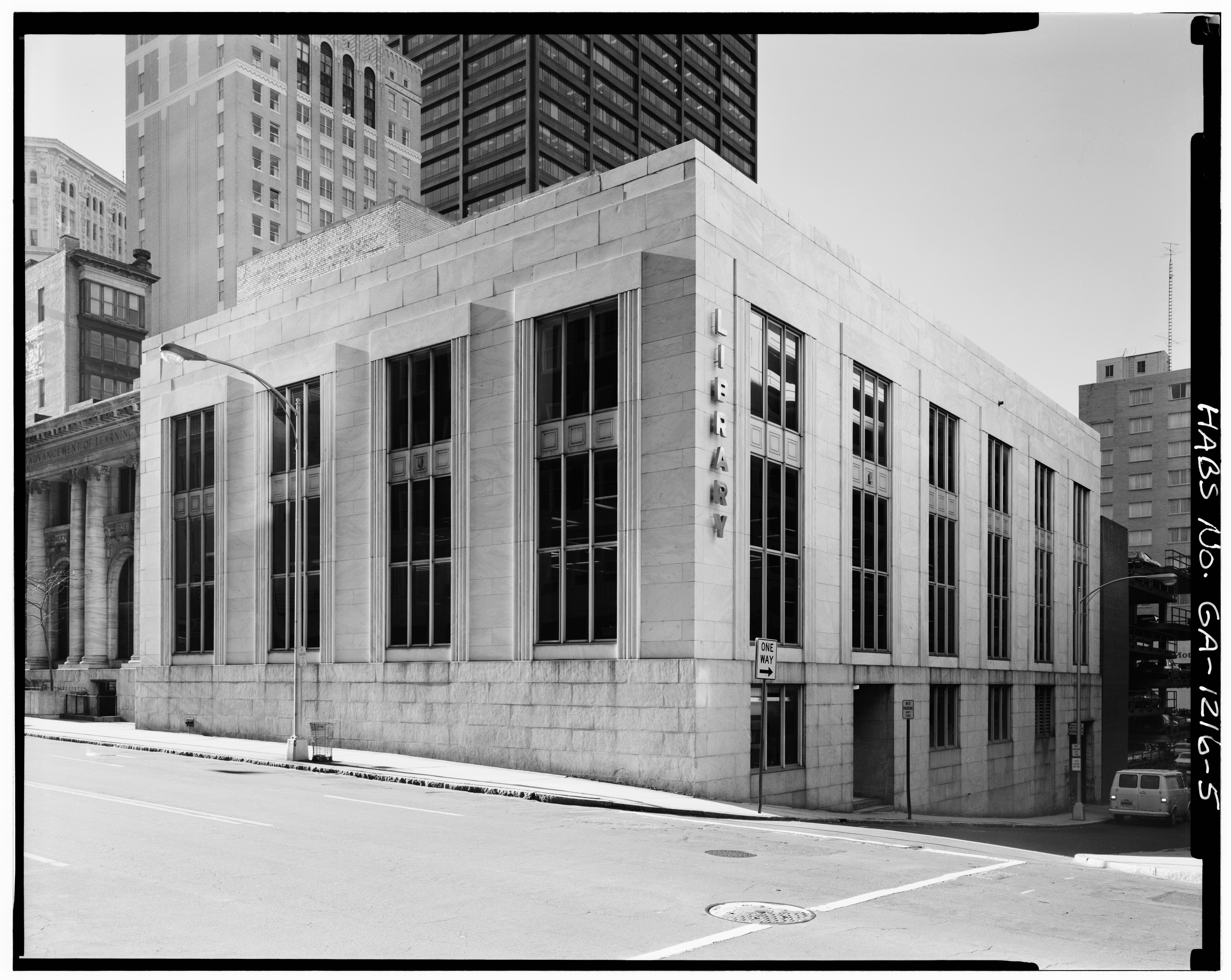
The 1950 addition

In March 1948, the City Council approved plans to instead expand the existing Carnegie building and to acquire the adjacent Lorraine and Pickwick hotels for that purpose. The buildings, spanning a 60-by-100-foot (18 by 30 m) site, were acquired that May and were soon demolished for the library expansion. The APL approved the distribution of the bond money that July. Toombs and Creighton were hired to draw up plans, which the APL trustees' building subcommittee approved in early 1949. Christian & Bell Co. received the contract to build the annex for about $734,000 in June, and the Central Library's services were temporarily relocated to Peachtree Street two months later. The original building was also extensively renovated for the first time, and its interior was gutted. The work added mechanical systems and lifts, and it more than doubled the floor space to 82,000 square feet (7,600 m^{2}). The first APL board meeting in the newly expanded building took place in October 1950, and the structure reopened on November 30. It could accommodate 250,000 volumes, about half the APL's total collection.

==== Mid-1950s to 1970s ====
A fine arts department opened on the second floor in February 1953, and the APL relocated books on the lowest bookshelves that May after officials found that books on low shelves were rarely perused. Twenty gay men were arrested in the building following a raid that September. Additionally, the building's second-floor fine arts room was rededicated in December 1954 in memory of the writer Margaret Mitchell. The Central Library remained segregated through the 1950s, even after the desegregation of other libraries in the American South and a US Supreme Court ruling that desegregated schools. Black patrons petitioned the APL's board of trustees for permission to use the Central Library, but the APL rejected their petition in 1955. Another desegregation petition also failed two years later; the APL claimed that existing black library branches were little used. The entire APL system was quietly desegregated in May 1959 after the chairman of the APL's board could not identify any laws that justified continued segregation. Few white patrons objected to the change.

Funding for further upgrades to the Carnegie Library building was included in a May 1963 bond-issue referendum. Voters overwhelmingly approved the bond issue, which provided $100,000 for the building's renovation; the federal government provided an additional $82,000. Over the next year, architects drew up designs for the project, the building's second major refurbishment. The work included adding an elevator, staircase, book-deposit box, and book conveyor system; reorganizing the books and periodicals; relocating the children's department to the first floor; and replacing lighting and repainting the interiors. Costing $167,878, the work began in August 1965 and was completed by January 1966. The Central Library had eight divisions by the late 1960s, consisting of a reference desk, a children's department, a circulating section, and five research sections.

Concurrently, Wheeler had conducted a second study of the Carnegie Library building in 1965, concluding that the building benefited from its central location. He said the building was negatively impacted by "a peculiar poverty complex" despite serving a city with a higher-than-average income for the Southeastern United States. Wheeler's 1965 study prompted library officials to consider a new central branch building. To deter theft, an electronic security system was installed in 1969; at the time, the branch recorded 3,500 lost or stolen items annually. The next year, the Samuel W. Williams Black America Collection was relocated to the Central Library.

=== Replacement ===
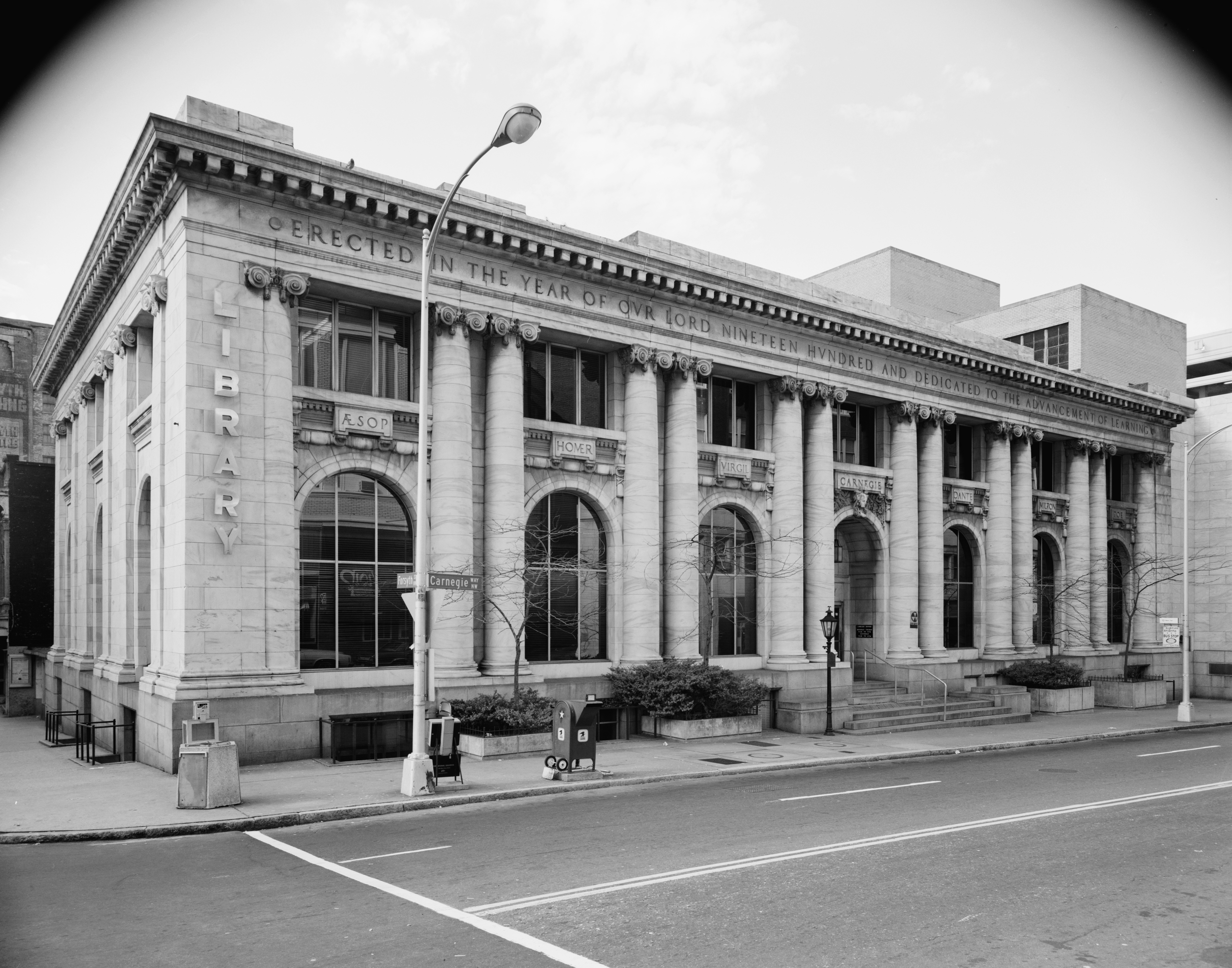
The Carnegie Library building's Carnegie Way facade in 1976, just before its demolition

Even as the 1960s renovation was being completed, APL officials considered replacing the structure, which had a myriad of issues including outdated wiring, leaking roofs, and cracking plasterwork. The publicly-usable open stacks could fit only 70,000 volumes, and there was only a one-fourth chance that a patron would find a selected book in the open stacks. The closed stacks accounted for a supermajority of the Central Library's collection in the late 1960s, but the absence of climate control systems in the closed stacks had caused these volumes to decay significantly. The reading room, spanning 20,000 square feet (1,900 m^{2}), had been designed for a city of 80,000 people, even though the surrounding Fulton County had 670,000 residents by the mid-1970s. The Central Library also had lower circulation than branches in more affluent areas such as Sandy Springs.

Carlton Rochell proposed a new structure shortly after becoming the APL system's director in 1968. Two studies had found that it was infeasible to refurbish the Carnegie Library building, and preserving the existing facade in front of a new building would have required unwieldy structural changes. The new Central Library was tentatively planned to occupy the entire city block between Carnegie Way and Fairlie, Williams, and Forsyth streets, including the Carnegie site. There were brief discussions about constructing the central branch elsewhere by 1969, but by the next year, the Carnegie site was again being proposed for the new central branch's location. The APL hired Marcel Breuer and Associates to draw up plans for a new building in 1970, and these plans were announced the next year. Construction was delayed for several years due to disputes over funding; a bond issue for the new structure was approved in 1975.

==== Demolition ====
The city's Design Commission wanted to add the old building's facade to the National Register of Historic Places (NRHP) and construct a museum there. Ultimately, both the library board and the City Council recommended that the new central branch be built on the Carnegie Library's site. The Carnegie Library building was concurrently added to the NRHP in October 1976, but it was still marked for demolition, prompting preservationists to form the Ad Hoc Committee to Save the Old Carnegie Library in January 1977. Simultaneously, as part of a proposed land swap involving another nearby plot, the Metropolitan Atlanta Rapid Transit Authority (MARTA) proposed acquiring an adjacent site for an entrance to the Peachtree Center station, preserving the old building's facade. In the days before the Carnegie Library closed, many patrons used the building merely to rest or stay warm. The Carnegie Library closed on February 14, and the APL's central branch moved to Pryor Street.

In March 1977, the Ad Hoc Committee requested a restraining order to prevent the Carnegie Library building's destruction, but the federal Advisory Council on Historic Preservation, which had to approve modifications to NRHP-listed sites, recommended demolition. Although the United States Court of Appeals for the Fifth Circuit granted a temporary injunction in April, it was quickly rescinded. Work began in October 1977; the Carnegie Library building was delisted from the NRHP that month and was torn down to make way for Breuer's structure. Parts of the facade were salvaged, and the temporary Central Branch on Pryor Street used furniture from the old building. The time capsule from the original library was unsealed that December. The new building was dedicated in 1980, housing 350,000 volumes from the Carnegie Library's collection.

== Description ==
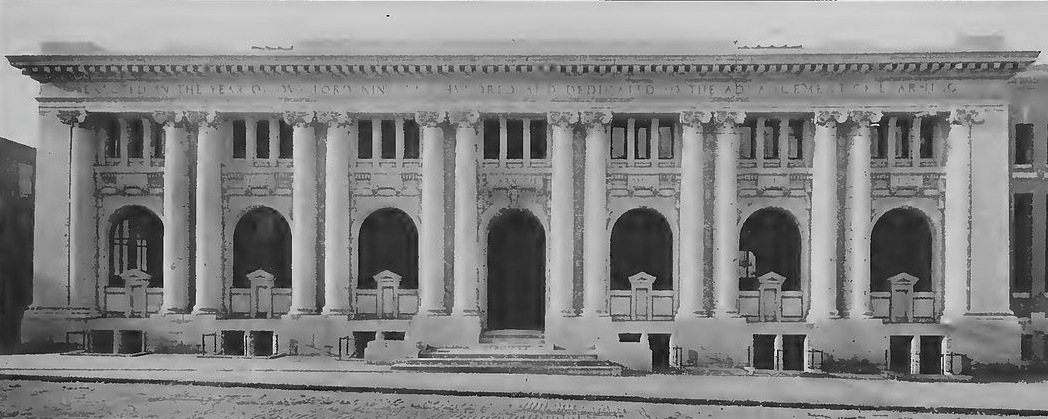
Front view of the Carnegie Library

The Carnegie Library building was located at the western corner of Forsyth Street and Carnegie Way in Atlanta, Georgia, United States. It was designed in the Beaux-Arts style by the firm of Ackerman and Ross. The building was two stories high with a slightly raised basement and a rectangular floor plan. It had a Georgia marble facade topped by a hipped roof. The main structure measured 116 by 64 feet (35 by 20 m) across, while a protruding annex for the stacks, measuring 18 by 56 feet (5.5 by 17.1 m) across, was set back slightly from the street. When it was demolished, the Carnegie Library building was Downtown Atlanta's only Beaux-Arts building from the beginning of the 20th century.

=== Exterior ===
The primary elevations of the facade, on Forsyth Street and Carnegie Way, were divided vertically into bays; there were two Ionic columns between each bay, while the extreme ends of each elevation had one Ionic column and one flat, Ionic pilaster. The columns and pilasters supported a frieze with an inscription. Within each bay, the first floor had round-arched windows. With the exception of the central arch on Carnegie Way—which contained the main entrance—there were doorways and pediments in each first-story arch, topped by plaques bearing inscriptions of notable literary figures' names. (Note: From left to right, the inscriptions spelled the names of Aesop, Homer, Virgil, Dante, Milton, and Poe.) The main entrance was accessed by a flight of stairs and topped by a carving of Andrew Carnegie's face; early plans had called for lions flanking this staircase. On the second floor, the windows in each bay were divided into three panels each. Embedded into the facade was a stone bearing the YMLA's initials, salvaged from the former YMLA building.

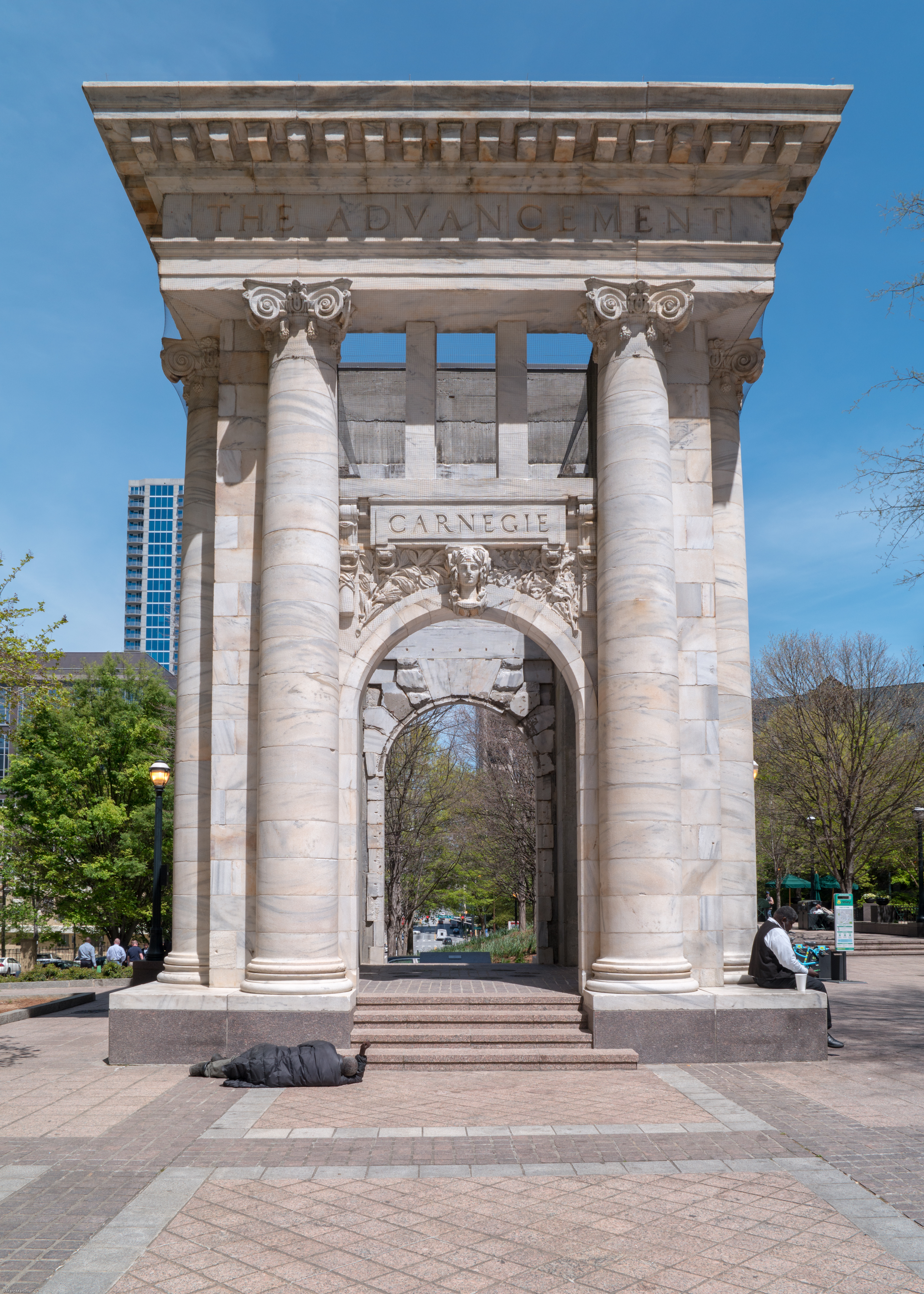
Parts of the library's facade were incorporated into the Carnegie Education Pavilion (pictured 2018).

A small number of decorations from the original building remain extant. Parts of the facade were moved to the Old Atlanta Prison Farm when the building was demolished. When the Old Atlanta Prison Farm closed, parts of the building were repurposed as vehicle barricades. Some of the decorations at the farm were incorporated into an arch designed by Henri Jova for the nearby Carnegie Education Pavilion. The pavilion, built in conjunction with the 1996 Summer Olympics and dedicated in 1997, consists of blocks that weigh between 0.4 to 7.5 short tons (0.36 to 6.70 long tons; 0.36 to 6.80 t) each. Scattered decorations also exist along the Carnegie Trail in southeast Atlanta.

=== Interior ===
The original building had a capacity of 70,000 or 75,000 volumes. It originally spanned 36,000 square feet (3,300 m^{2}) but was expanded to 82,000 square feet (7,600 m^{2}) in 1950, with total space for 380,000 volumes. The interiors originally had a green-and-dark color scheme. Mosaic tiles, marble, and oak woodwork were used throughout the building, and there were four floors of stacks connected by two book lifts. The original interiors were completely overhauled during the 1949–1950 renovation.

The original basement had a children's room on the left (southeast) side, with its own entrance, bathroom, and cloakroom. Measuring approximately 60 by 33 feet (18 by 10 m) across, (Note: Another source gives a figure of 33.5 by 58 feet (10.2 by 17.7 m).) it was decorated in a buff-and-blue color palette to "lighten the room considerably", as the Atlanta Constitution described it. The children's room, located in the basement, had a fireplace mantel with tiles depicting A. B. Frost's illustrations of scenes from the Uncle Remus folktale. A workroom, of similar size to the children's room, was located on the right (northwest) side of the basement and led to the stacks.

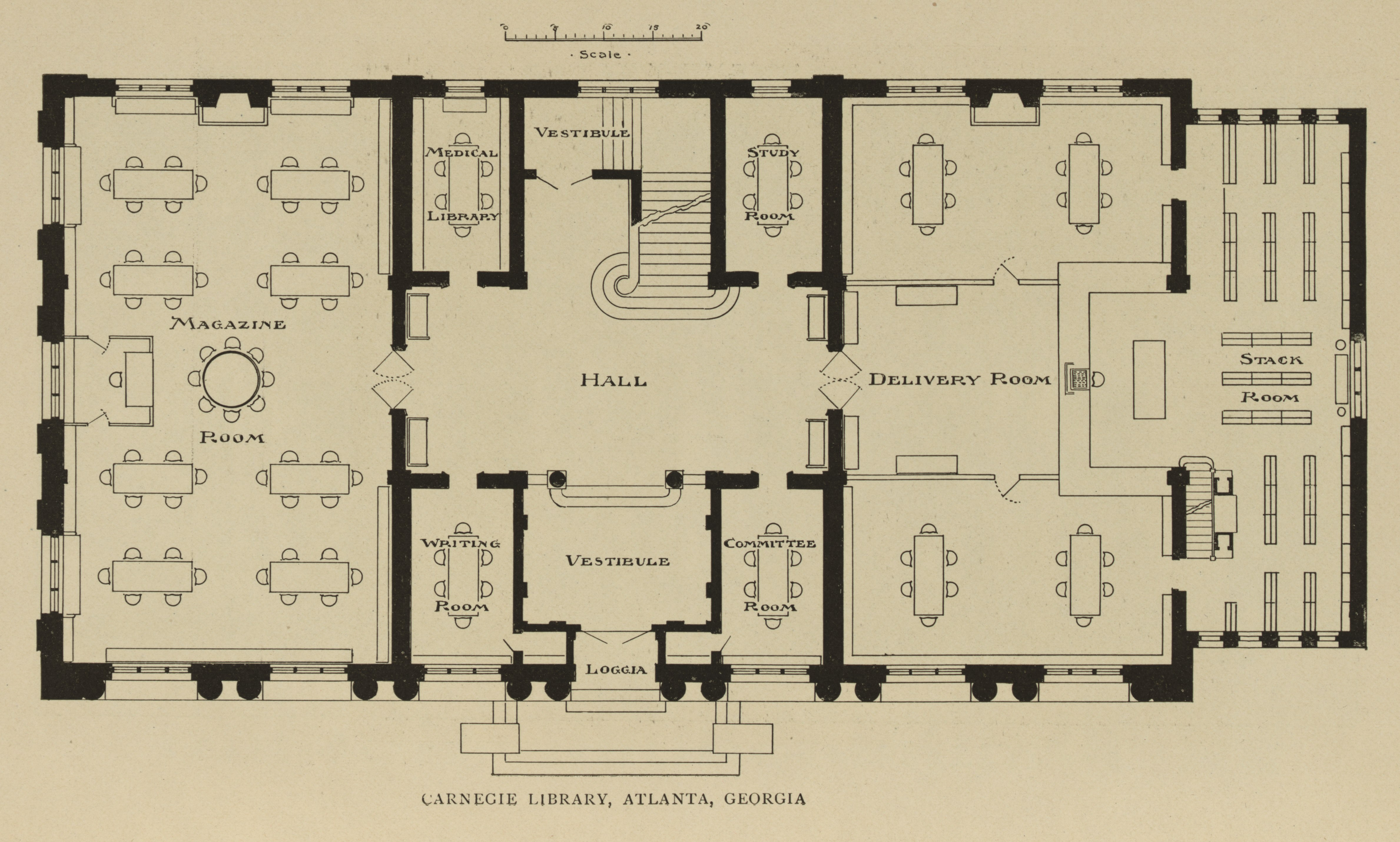
Interior floor plan

The first floor was used for reading and deliveries, while the second floor had training programs and offices. The first floor was arranged around a main corridor and staircase. The central hall, a cruciform space measuring 42 by 20 feet (12.8 by 6.1 m), led to a delivery room on the right and a magazine room on the left. There were four smaller reading rooms, one at each corner of the central hall; a staircase extended off the rear (southwest) wall. The first floor also contained a book-repair department. On the second floor, the reference room was on the right side, directly above the delivery room and open stacks. The center of the second floor contained various administration offices, and the left side had a lecture room.

== Reception and media ==
When Ackerman & Ross were hired to build the Carnegie Library structure, The Atlanta Constitution described the plans as "simple and straightforward" both inside and out. The Atlanta Journal wrote in 1901 that the building's "architecture and its workmanship make it an ornament to Atlanta". By the time the building was proposed for demolition, The Atlanta Constitution wrote in 1975 that the building was "a pathetic reminder of the place of culture in this modern commercial capital". After demolition was complete, the Carnegie Library building was depicted in a 1978 exhibit at the Atlanta Historical Society. In a 1993 book on the architecture of Atlanta, the American Institute of Architects listed the Carnegie Library as one of the most notable landmarks in the city to have been demolished, alongside the Peachtree Arcade, the Equitable Building, and Terminal Station.

== See also ==
- List of Carnegie libraries in Georgia
- National Register of Historic Places listings in Fulton County, Georgia#Former listings
