= Carnegie Education Pavilion =

Marble Beaux-Arts monument in Atlanta, Georgia

Coordinates: 33.762633°N 84.387533°W

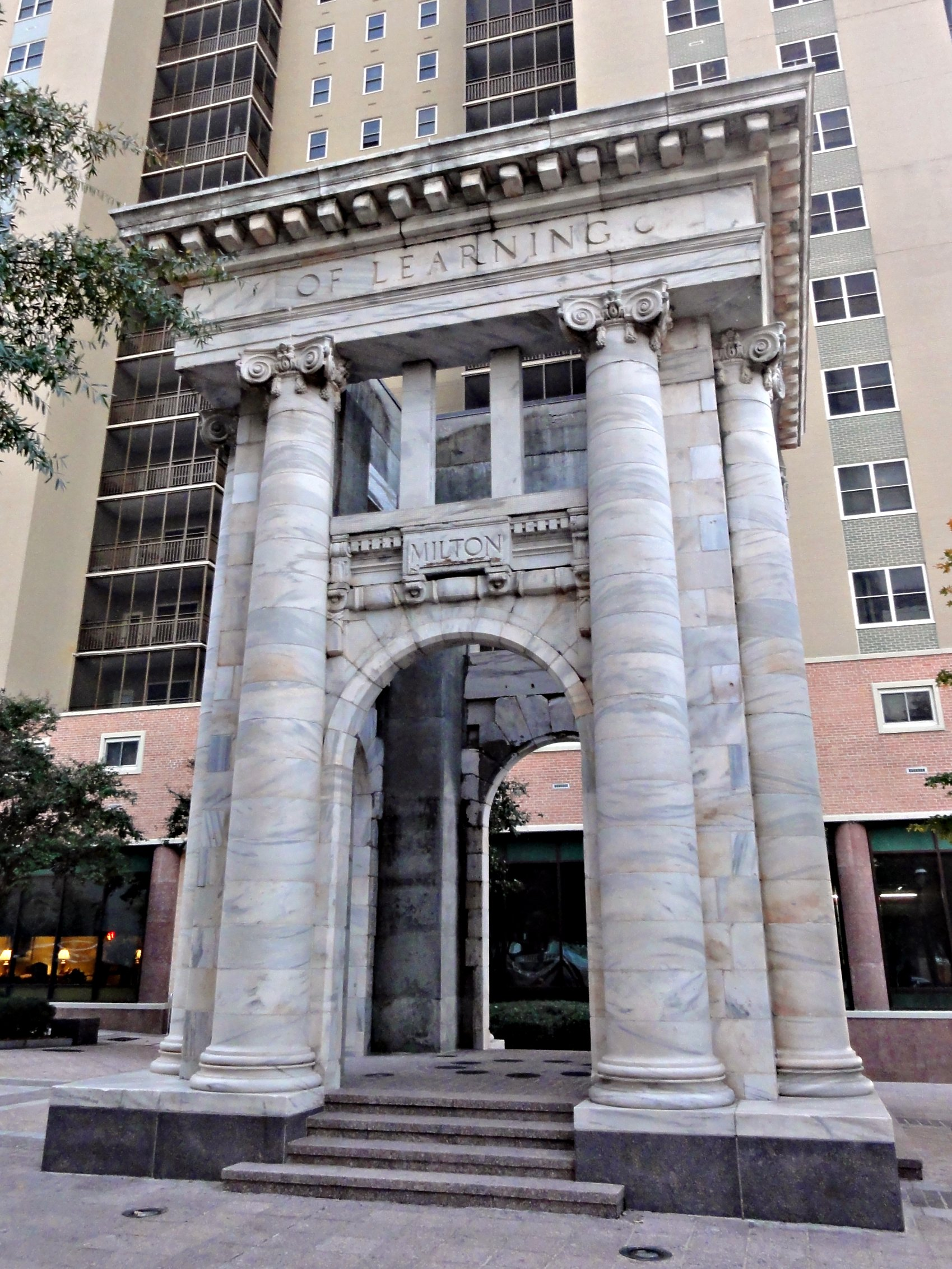
- Carnegie Education Pavilion
- Interactive map of the Carnegie Education Pavilion area

General information
- Type: Pavilion
- Location: Hardy Ivy Park, Atlanta, Georgia, United States
- Construction started: 1996
- Completed: 1997

Design and construction
- Architect: Henri Jova

The Carnegie Education Pavilion, more often known as the Carnegie Monument, is a marble Beaux-Arts monument located in Atlanta, Georgia, United States. The pavilion was constructed in 1996 from the exterior facade of the Carnegie Library, named after Andrew Carnegie. The monument pays homage to the legacy of Carnegie by serving as a monument to higher education in Atlanta, with the seals of nine local area colleges and universities embedded in the floor of the monument. The monument was commissioned in 1996 by the Corporation for Olympic Development in Atlanta and designed by Henri Jova. The pavilion is located in Downtown's Hardy Ivy Park, at the curve in Peachtree Street where it diverges with West Peachtree Street. The monument's inscription reads: "The Advancement of Learning." It also features the inscriptions of the names of three famous Western poets "Dante", "Milton", and "Asop", in addition to the library's namesake, "Carnegie".

== The Carnegie Library ==
From 1899 to 1901, Andrew Carnegie, the steel magnate and philanthropist from Pittsburgh, donated $145,000 to construct, furnish, and supply a new public library in Atlanta. A site was chosen at 126 Carnegie Way in downtown Atlanta. The library, built by New York architects Ackerman and Ross, opened in 1902. It was renovated in 1950 and 1966, and remained the central library of the system until it was demolished in 1977 in order to make way for the controversial Marcel Breuer-designed Central Library. The architectural bays of the original structure were preserved and used to create the pavilion twenty years after the building's demolition.

== Gallery ==
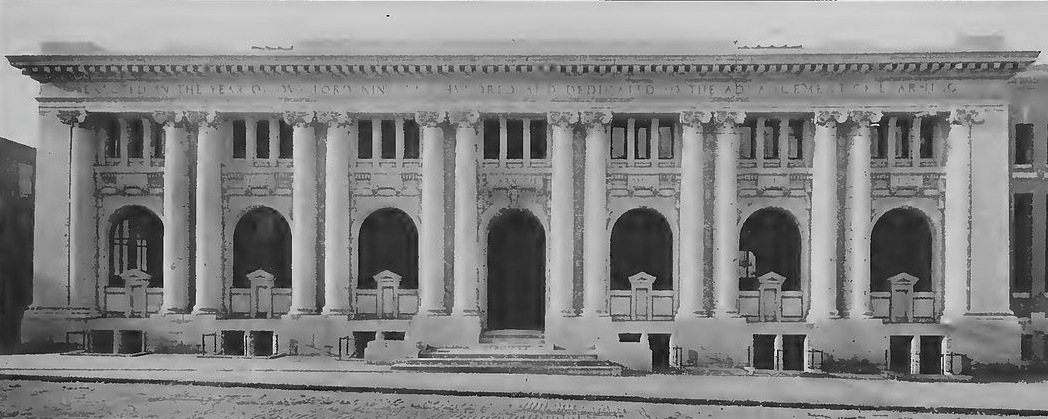
The former Carnegie Library, now destroyed

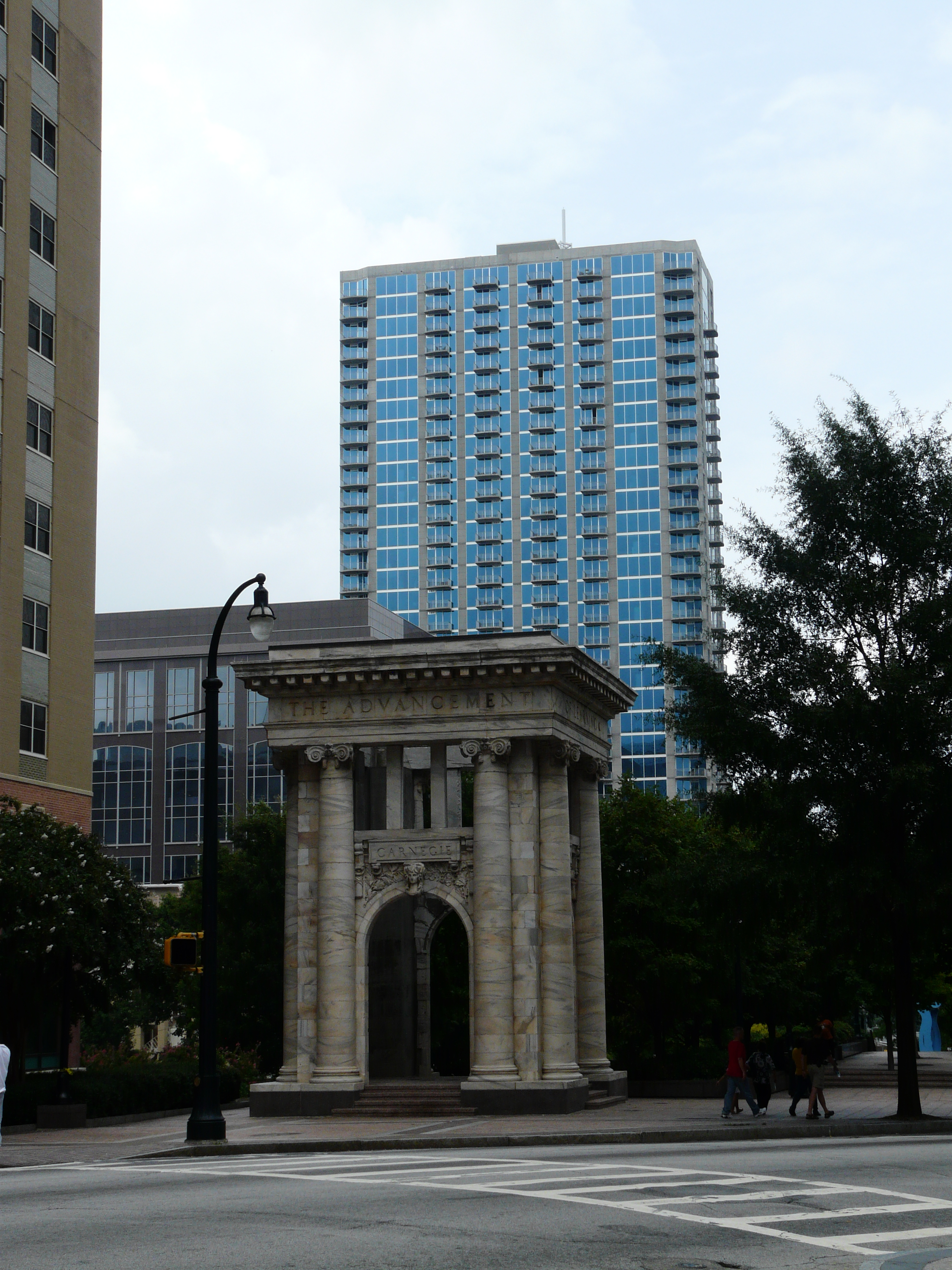
The Carnegie Monument in 2010
