= Moody Nolan =

Architecture firm based in Columbus, Ohio

Practice information
- Founded: 1983
- Headquarters: 300 Spruce St. Ste. 300, Columbus, Ohio

Significant works and honors
- Awards: AIA Firm Award

Website
- moodynolan.com

Moody Nolan, founded in Columbus, Ohio, in 1983, is the largest African-American-owned and operated architecture firm in the United States, with 12 offices nationwide. In 2021, it was the recipient of The American Institute of Architects (AIA) Architecture Firm Award. The firm provides architectural, interior and experiential design services for civic, education, healthcare, housing, commercial, retail, recreation, sports, and cultural institutions.

== History ==
Moody Nolan was founded by the late architect, Curt Moody and engineer Howard E. Nolan in 1983 with the goal of developing a diverse architectural practice, unlike other minority firms. In 2014, the civil engineering practice split off to form Moody Engineering. In 2018, the firm founded the Legacy House Project, which annually gifts a house to a family in need.

In 2020, Curt Moody's son, Jonathan Moody, became the CEO.

As of 2025, the firm has 12 office locations and 280 employees.Moody Nolan has established offices in Atlanta, Boston, Chicago, Cincinnati, Cleveland, Columbus, Dallas, Houston, Philadelphia, Nashville, New York City, and Washington, D.C.

== Awards ==
- 2000 National Organization of Minority Architects’ (NOMA) Firm of the Year
- 2021 AIA Architecture Firm Award

== Notable projects ==
- 2021: Atlanta Central Library
- 2022: Thurgood Marshall Hall, Morgan State University
- 2023: Karl Road Branch, Columbus Metropolitan Library
- 2023: International African American Museum
- 2026: Home Court, Barack Obama Presidential Center
