= Statue of Benjamin Harvey Hill =

Statue in the Georgia State Capitol

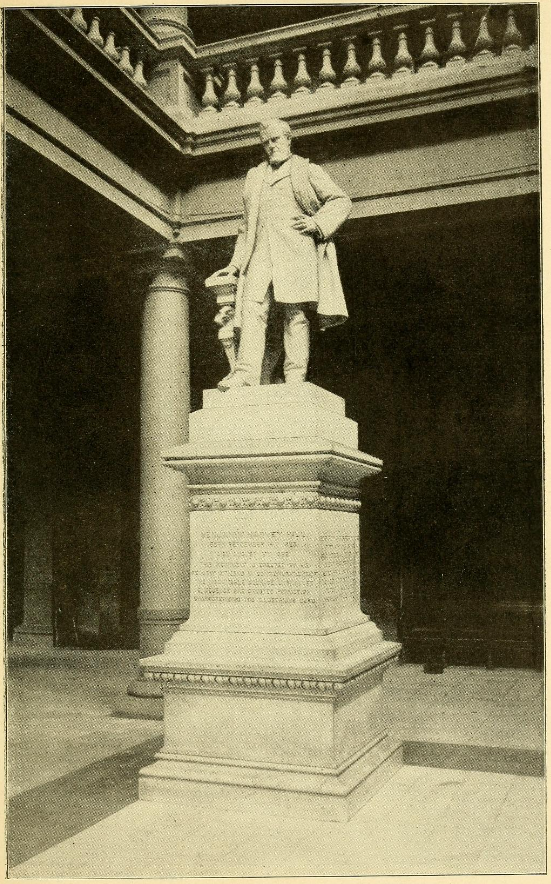
- The statue in the Georgia State Capitol rotunda, c. 1907
- Location: Georgia State Capitol, Atlanta, Georgia, United States
- Designer: Alexander Doyle
- Type: Statue
- Material: Italian marble
- Length: 53 inches (1.3 m)
- Width: 53 inches (1.3 m)
- Height: 161 inches (4.1 m)
- Completion date: 1885
- Dedicated date: May 1, 1886
- Dedicated to: Benjamin Harvey Hill

A statue of Benjamin Harvey Hill stands inside the Georgia State Capitol in Atlanta, Georgia, United States. The monumental statue was designed by American sculptor Alexander Doyle and originally dedicated in 1886 at what is now Hardy Ivy Park. The statue was relocated to the capitol building in 1890.

== History ==
=== Background ===
Benjamin Harvey Hill was a politician from the U.S. state of Georgia in the 1800s. During the American Civil War, he served as a member of the Confederate States Senate and was a spokesperson for Jefferson Davis, President of the Confederate States of America. Following the war, he continued his political career and served as a member of the United States Senate. Considered a prominent figure in the New South, he died on August 16, 1882. Following Hill's death, efforts were made towards the creation of a public monument in his honor. An association for this purpose, with R. D. Spalding as its president, was formed and began to fundraise for the monument. Sculptor Alexander Doyle of New York City was selected to design the monument, a statue of Hill's likeness, which he completed in 1885.

=== Dedication ===
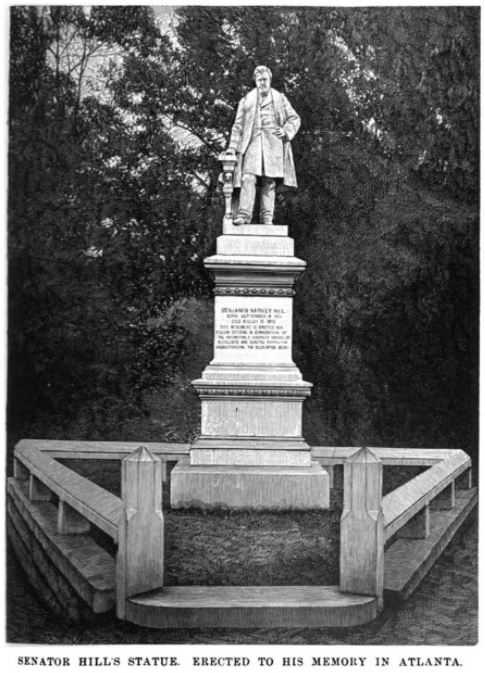
The statue at its original location, c. 1893

The statue was dedicated on May 1, 1886. Henry W. Grady served as the master of ceremonies for the event, which attracted tens of thousands of spectators. (Note: Sources differ on the exact size of the crowd. Historians Ruth Blair and Lucian Lamar Knight claim approximately 20,000 spectators for the event, while an 1893 biography of Hill's life organized by his son claims a crowd of "at least fifty thousand" and a 1904 biography of James Longstreet organized by his wife Helen Dortch Longstreet claims a crowd of 40,000. Historian Franklin Garrett claims that "there were probably no less than 100,000 people on the streets.") According to historian Lucian Lamar Knight, over half of the audience consisted of Confederate States Army (CSA) veterans. The location for the monument was at the southern intersection of Peachtree Street and West Peachtree Street, in the vicinity of what is today Hardy Ivy Park. General Clement A. Evans gave an invocation for the event, which was followed by an oration by Major J. C. C. Black of Augusta, Georgia and other speeches from Davis, Georgia Governor Henry Dickerson McDaniel, and Spalding. Grady, in introducing Davis to the audience, proclaimed him the "South's uncrowned king". At the introduction of Davis, the crowd responded with approximately 10 minutes of applause. Following this, Davis gave a brief speech where he said, "If I were asked from Georgia's history to name three typical men I would choose Oglethorpe the benevolent, Troup the dauntless, and Hill the faithful." The statue was formally unveiled following Spalding's speech.

A significant moment during the dedication ceremony arose when James Longstreet, who had been a lieutenant general in the CSA, was welcomed to the platform. Following the Civil War, Longstreet had been somewhat ostracized by other Confederate veterans due to his affiliation with the Republican Party. However, he had been invited to the unveiling of this statue and decided to attend. Traveling from his home in Gainesville, Georgia, he was dressed in his Confederate uniform and on horseback, initially near the outskirts of the crowd on Peachtree Street. Prior to the start of the ceremony, he was brought to the platform and given a warm embrace by Davis to the applause of the crowd.

=== Relocation ===
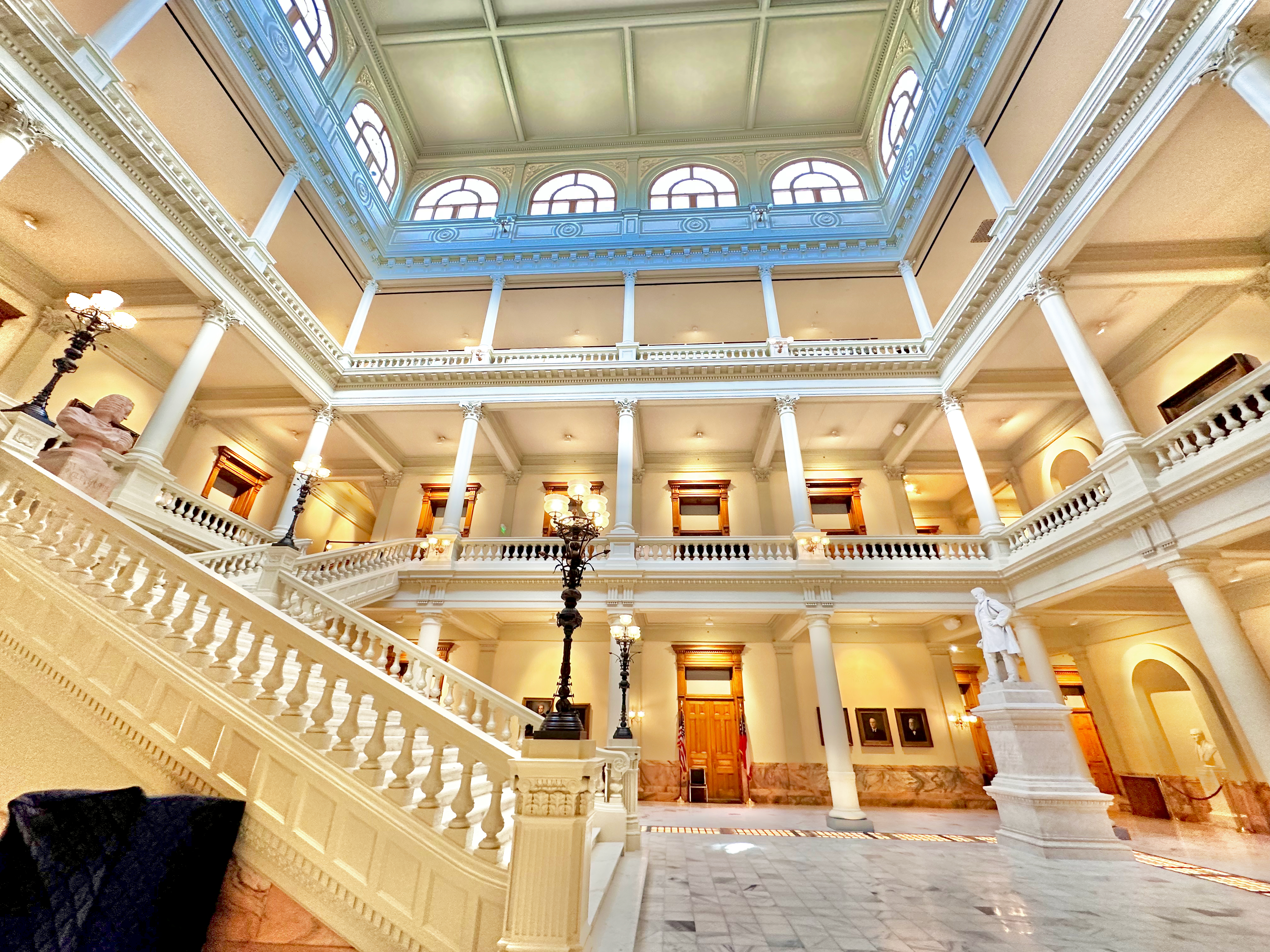
The statue inside the capitol building in 2023

In 1890, the statue was moved from its location at the intersection of Peachtree Street and West Peachtree Street to inside the Georgia State Capitol. According to a 2019 article in The Atlanta Journal-Constitution, the move was made to make room for the Erskine Memorial Fountain, which was planned for that location. The move, which had been arranged by Georgia Governor John Brown Gordon, was approved by the Georgia General Assembly in December 1890. A 2007 history book called it "the first major sculpture to enter the new statehouse". It is located in the north wing of the rotunda, near the first-floor landing. The statue is one of several pieces of art commemorating the Confederacy at the capitol, including an equestrian statue of John Brown Gordon on the building's lawn and a portrait of Robert E. Lee hanging near the chambers of the Georgia House of Representatives.

On May 30, 1893, during the funeral procession of Davis from New Orleans to his tomb in Richmond, Virginia, he was temporarily laid in state inside the Georgia State Capitol, where his open coffin was placed in front of the statue of Hill.

== Design ==
The monument is sculpted from Italian marble and features Hill standing atop a large pedestal. The pedestal covers a square base with equal sides of 53 inches (1.3 m) each and the monument as a whole has a height of 161 inches (4.1 m). Inscribed on the four sides of the pedestal are the following: (Note: The directions here indicate its orientation in its original location, where it was facing south.)

Benjamin Harvey Hill. Born September 14, 1823. Died August 16, 1882. This monument is erected by his fellow-citizens in commemoration of the indomitable courage, unrivaled eloquence and devoted patriotism characterizing the illustrious dead.

— South side

Member of the House of Representatives of Georgia during 1859 and 1860. Member of the Convention of 1861. Beloved in private life, distinguished at the bar, and eminent in public relations, he was at all times the champion of human liberty.

— East side

Member of the Provisional Congress of the Confederate States. Senator of the Confederate States from 1861 to 1865. Member of the House of Representatives of the United States from 1875 to 1877; and Senator of the United States from 1877 to the date of his death.

— West side

"We are in the house of our fathers, our brothers are our companions, and we are at home to stay, thank God."

– Amnesty Speech, January 11, 1876

"Who saves his country, saves himself, saves all things, and all things saved do bless him. Who lets his country die, lets all things die, dies himself ignobly, and all things dying curse him."

-Notes on the Situation

"The Union under the Constitution knows no section, but does know all the States."

-Speech in the United States Senate, June 11, 1879

— North side

== See also ==
- 1886 in art
- List of Confederate monuments and memorials in Georgia
- List of public art in Atlanta

== Bibliography ==
- Blair, Ruth (October 1940). "Atlanta's Monuments". Atlanta Historical Bulletin. V (23). Atlanta Historical Society: 273–277 – via Atlanta History Center.
- Crimmins, Timothy; Farrisee, Anne H. (2007). Democracy Restored: A History of the Georgia State Capitol. Featuring photographs by Diane Kirkland. University of Georgia Press. ISBN 978-0-8203-2911-6 – via Google Books.
- Edwards, Johnny (May 18, 2019). "Five things you may not know about Grant Park's Erskine Memorial Fountain". The Atlanta Journal-Constitution. Cox Enterprises. Archived from the original on March 20, 2020.
- Garrett, Franklin M. (1969). Atlanta and Environs: A Chronicle of Its People and Events, 1880s–1930s. Vol. II. University of Georgia Press. ISBN 978-0-8203-3905-4 – via Google Books.
- Acts and Resolutions of the General Assembly of the State of Georgia, 1890–91. Vol. I. Georgia General Assembly. Franklin Publishing House. 1891 – via Google Books.
- "Unveiling the Statue of Senator Hill at Atlanta, Georgia, May 1". Harper's Weekly. XXX (1533). Harper & Brothers: 301. May 8, 1886 – via Google Books.
- Hill, Benjamin H. Jr. (1893). Senator Benjamin H. Hill of Georgia: His Life, Speeches and Writings. T. H. P. Bloodworth – via Google Books.
- Kelley, Collin (May 1, 2012). "A Look Back". Atlanta Intown. Archived from the original on October 4, 2012.
- Knight, Lucian Lamar (1913). Georgia's Landmarks, Memorials, and Legends. Vol. I. The Byrd Printing Company – via Google Books.
- Lanard, Thomas S. (1911). History of the Infantry Battalion State Fencibles of Philadelphia, Pennsylvania: And the Gate City Guard of Atlanta, Ga. and Its Peaceful Invasion of the North, 1879. Old Guard State Fencibles – via Google Books.
- Longstreet, Helen D. (1904). Lee and Longstreet at High Tide: Gettysburg in the Light of the Official Records. The author. ISBN 9780527582005 – via Google Books.
- Nolin, Jill (June 9, 2020). "Calls grow to remove Confederate statue from state Capitol's front lawn". Georgia Recorder. States Newsroom. Archived from the original on October 16, 2020.
