= Hardy Ivy Park =

Pocket park in Atlanta

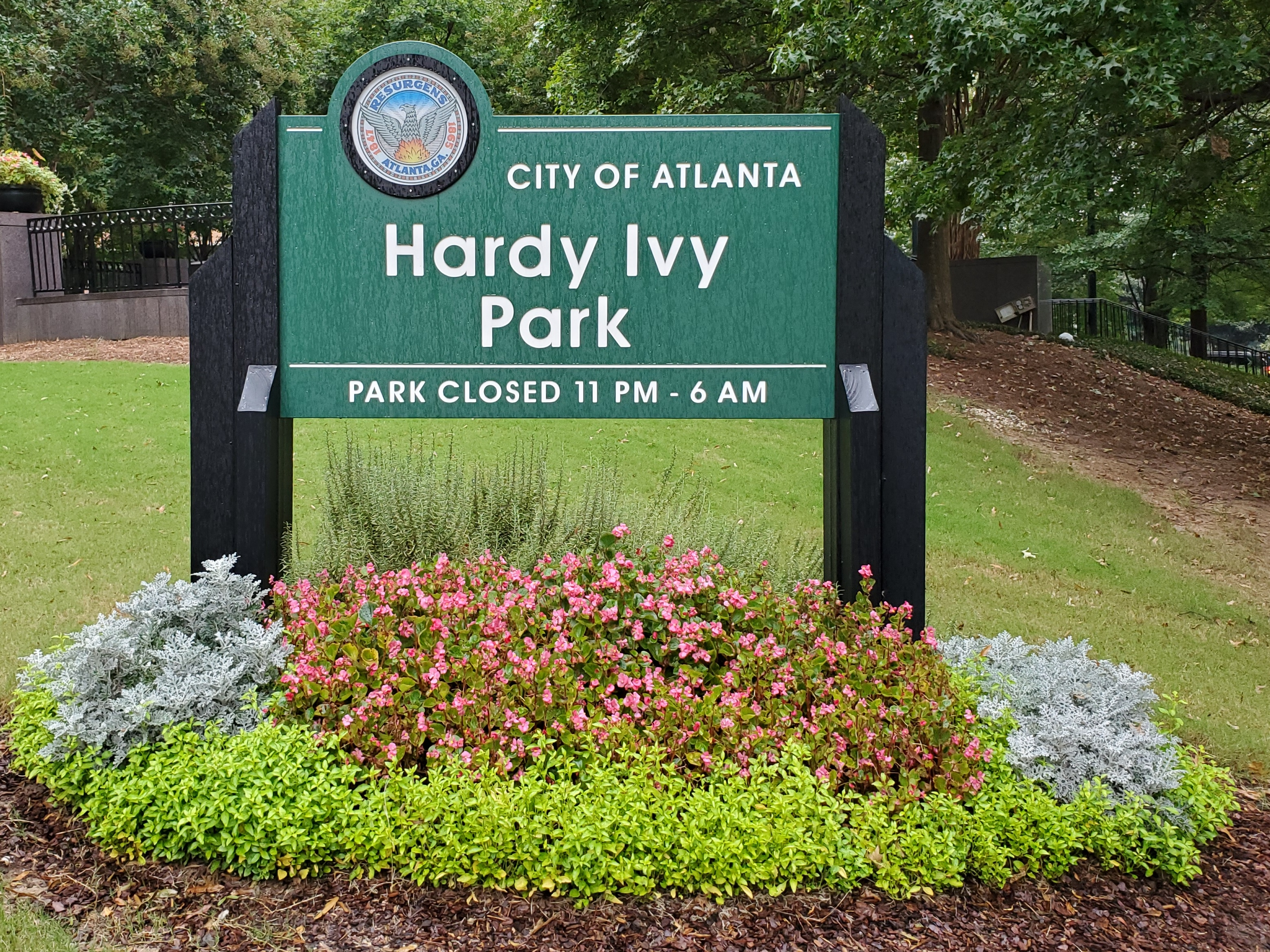

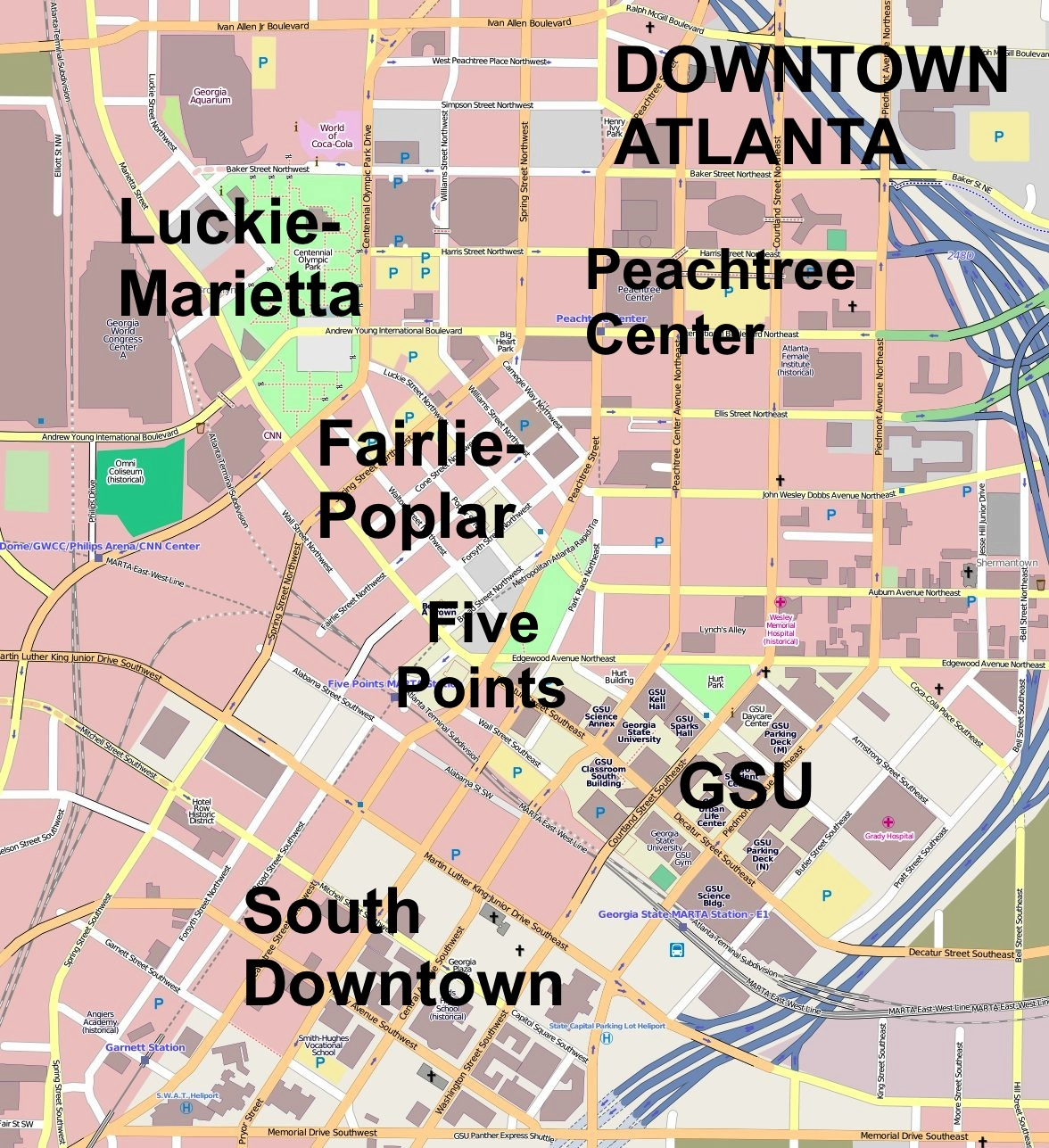
- Location within Downtown Atlanta Location within Atlanta Location within Georgia Location within the United States
- Type: Pocket park
- Location: Downtown Atlanta, Georgia, United States
- Coordinates: 33.7630°N 84.3874°W

Hardy Ivy Park is a pocket park in downtown Atlanta, Georgia, United States.

== History ==
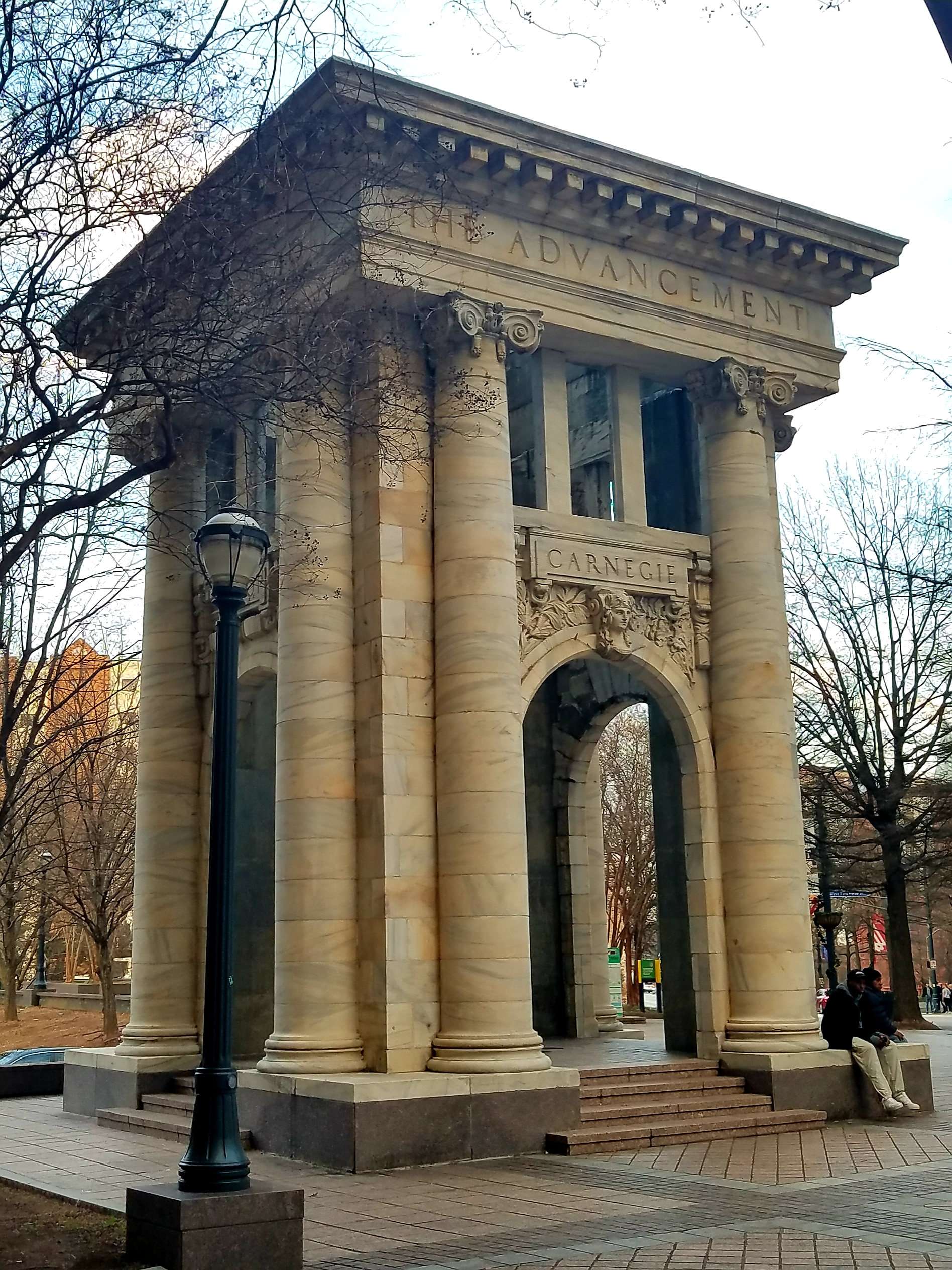
Carnegie Education Pavilion at Hardy Ivy Park

The namesake for the park is Hardy Ivy, who is generally considered the first person of European descent to settle in what is now Atlanta. According to The Atlanta Journal-Constitution, the name was chosen to appease the Ivy family after Ivy Street was renamed Peachtree Center Avenue in the late 20th century. The park is located on a small triangular tract of land at the divergence of Peachtree Street and West Peachtree Street in downtown.

In May 1896, the city of Atlanta commemorated the Erskine Memorial Fountain in honor of Judge John Erskine at the location. In order to make room for the fountain, a marble statue of Benjamin Harvey Hill was moved from the park to the Georgia State Capitol. The fountain, designed by sculptor J. Massey Rhind, was later relocated to Grant Park in 1912.

In the later half of the 20th century, the park received another statue. Several years after the closing of Terminal Station, a statue of Samuel Spencer, which had stood in front of the station since 1910, was moved to the park. The statue has since been moved to a location in midtown Atlanta. In the late 1990s, the Carnegie Education Pavilion was moved to the park, where it currently still stands. In 2011, the government of Atlanta officially renamed the plaza in the park the Xernona Clayton Plaza in honor of civil rights leader Xernona Clayton. An accompanying plaque honors her career.

== Bibliography ==
- Edwards, Johnny (May 18, 2019). "Five things you may not know about Grant Park's Erskine Memorial Fountain". The Atlanta Journal-Constitution. Cox Enterprises.
- Kueppers, Courtney (January 17, 2020). "These streets in Atlanta are named for civil rights leaders". The Atlanta Journal-Constitution. Cox Enterprises.
- Lee, Conor (August 12, 2014). "The Erskine Memorial Fountain". History Atlanta.
- McWilliams, Jeremiah (November 3, 2011). "Harris Street renamed for John Portman, capping controversy". The Atlanta Journal-Constitution. Cox Enterprises.
- Morrison, Jeffrey (2019). Atlanta Underground: History from Below. Rowman & Littlefield. ISBN 978-1-4930-4371-2 – via Google Books.
- Pousner, Howard (March 26, 2014). "Trio of projects speak to architect Henri Jova's legacy in Atlanta". The Atlanta Journal-Constitution. Cox Enterprises.
- "Xernona Clayton – A History Maker and a Living Doll". The Atlanta Business Journal. February 13, 2016.
- Torpy, Bill (May 22, 2015). "Turner Field is kaput, and all Ted gets is this?". The Atlanta Journal-Constitution. Cox Enterprises.
