= Atlanta Central Library =

Public library in Georgia, US

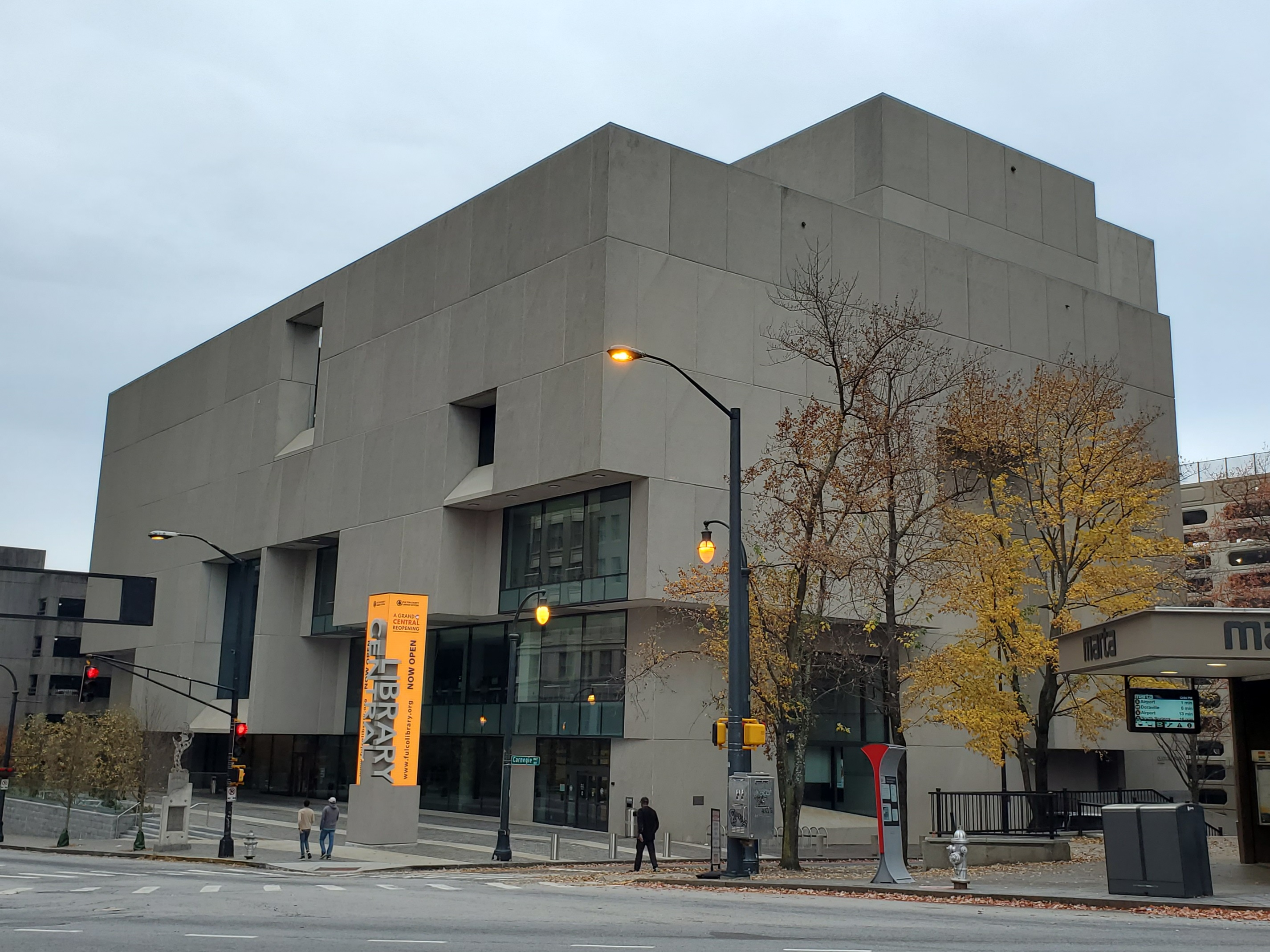
- The library in 2021
- Type: Municipal public library
- Established: March 4, 1902
- Branch of: Atlanta–Fulton Public Library System

Other information
- Public transit access: Peachtree Center; Route 40
- Website: Official website
- Building details

General information
- Architectural style: Brutalist
- Location: 1 Margaret Mitchell Square, Atlanta, Georgia, United States
- Coordinates: 33°45′28″N 84°23′18″W
- Construction started: 1977
- Opened: May 25, 1980
- Renovated: 2002, 2018–2021

Design and construction
- Architect: Marcel Breuer

Renovating team
- Architects: Moody Nolan, Cooper Carry
- Other designers: Vines Architects

The Atlanta Central Library is the main location of the Fulton County Library System (FCLS) in Downtown Atlanta, Georgia, United States. The eight-story building, completed in 1980 and designed by Marcel Breuer in the Brutalist style, occupies an entire city block and was Breuer's final completed work. It replaced the Carnegie Library, built for the Atlanta Public Library (APL), the FCLS's predecessor. The Central Library houses the FCLS's special collections and hundreds of thousands of volumes.

The original Carnegie Library opened in 1902 and was proposed for replacement by the 1960s. Breuer was hired to devise plans for the new branch, which were published in 1971. A bond issue to fund the construction of the branch was not approved until 1976; the Carnegie Library was demolished to make way for the Central Library, which was dedicated on May 25, 1980. Following several minor upgrades over the years, including a plaza renovation in the 1990s, the building was partially renovated in 2002. Following futile efforts to demolish the building in the late 2000s and the 2010s, a complete renovation took place from 2018 to 2021.

The building has a concrete facade with an inverted general shape and some windows. The interior was designed with a basement theater and restaurant; several stories of stacks and reading rooms; and administrative offices on the upper floors. Over the years, the Central Library received extensive architectural commentary; although architects praised the design, the general public was more critical.

== Site ==
The Atlanta Central Library is at 1 Margaret Mitchell Square Northwest in Atlanta, Georgia, United States. It occupies a full city block, which is surrounded by Fairlie Street to the northwest, Williams Street to the southwest, Forsyth Street to the southeast, and Carnegie Way to the northeast. The main facade on Forsyth Street faces Margaret Mitchell Square and Peachtree Street, overlooking where the original street grid intersects with another grid. The Wynne-Claughton Building is located immediately across Carnegie Way to the north, while the Georgia-Pacific Tower is across Peachtree Street to the east.

== History ==
The original central building of the Fulton County Library System (FCLS; originally the Atlanta Public Library, or APL (Note: The system itself was also formally known as the Carnegie Library of Atlanta until 1949. For clarity, this article refers to the former building as the "Carnegie Library", while the library system is referred to as the APL or FCLS.)) was the Carnegie Library, designed by Ackerman & Ross in the Beaux-Arts style, Following a donation from industrialist Andrew Carnegie, a board of trustees was established to operate a public library in 1899, and their first building opened on March 4, 1902. The Central Library was housed in the Carnegie Library building for most of the century, and additional branches were built over the years. To address overcrowding, an annex was completed in November 1935, and another expansion took place in 1950. After the second expansion, the Carnegie Library covered 82,000 square feet (7,600 m^{2}). By the 1960s and 1970s, there were myriad issues with the old building, including outdated wiring, leaking roofs, and cracking plasterwork. In addition, there was a shortage of usable books, the old library stacks were crumbling, and the building was too small to accommodate its traffic.

=== Development ===
==== Need for a new building ====
A 1965 study by the library expert Joseph L. Wheeler had prompted library officials to consider a new central branch building. Shortly after Carlton Rochell became the APL system's director in 1968, he proposed that the Carnegie Library be replaced with a larger facility, which he suggested would help the APL attract readers. The new branch was to be more than twice as large as the original facility, with space for 1 million volumes in open stacks and 500,000 volumes in closed stacks. Two studies had found that it was infeasible to refurbish the Carnegie Library, and preserving the existing facade in front of a new building would have required unwieldy structural changes. That August, the APL board passed a resolution to request $5.5 million in bonds, which was later increased to $6 million. The new branch was tentatively planned to occupy the entire city block between Carnegie Way and Fairlie, Williams, and Forsyth streets, including the Carnegie Library site. There were brief discussions about constructing the central branch elsewhere by 1969, but by the next year, the Carnegie site was again being proposed for the new central branch's location.

After Rochell interviewed several architects, the APL hired Marcel Breuer and Associates to draw up preliminary plans in May 1970; the firm received a full design contract that November. Rochell had been impressed by Breuer's design of the Whitney Museum's Madison Avenue building in New York City, and he wanted the new library building to be a cultural hub. In March 1971, Breuer revealed his designs for a concrete structure with cantilevered setbacks and intermittent large windows. Breuer and his team flew from New York City to present the plans, bringing along a wooden model in a baggage compartment. The preliminary plans also included a restaurant, an exhibition hall, meeting rooms, and a drive-through window for patrons. The APL had acquired all the land by that August, when the board of trustees, at the recommendation of Mayor Sam Massell, allocated funds to study the feasibility of constructing the new central branch under Five Points. Breuer's firm studied this proposal as well, which was presented to city officials that December, but the Five Points plan was ultimately rejected.

==== Funding, relocation, and demolition disputes ====
Construction stalled in 1972 and was delayed for several years due to disputes over the building's funding source. In particular, politicians did not want to host a bond-issue referendum, which required raising taxes by the same amount as the bond issue. Massell had unsuccessfully attempted to get the Georgia government to pay for the new building, and the original cost estimate had increased by $3 million by mid-1973. The funding source was a major point of contention in the 1973 Atlanta mayoral election, where only two candidates supported the bond issue referendum, even as most of the candidates endorsed the new building. Maynard Jackson, who won the election, pledged to instead secure funding through private means but was unable to find a financier. Although the library's trustees wished to remain at Carnegie Way, there were proposals to move the building elsewhere. (Note: The proposed sites included Bedford Pine, Woodruff Park (next to the Candler Building), the Loew's Grand Theatre (across Peachtree Street from the Carnegie site).)

Costs had increased to over $20 million by the mid-1970s, and the referendum had been rejected four times by 1975. APL trustees approved a resolution that March, requesting $1.2 million of city tax revenue for the new building, and the Friends of the Atlanta Public Library was established to advocate for the building. In October 1975, the Atlanta City Council agreed to include $18.9 million for the building in an upcoming referendum involving three other projects. Although the projects were listed separately on the ballot, the new building's supporters promoted all four projects jointly to avoid drawing undue attention to the library bonds. The library funds were narrowly approved that December, largely along racial lines: Black voters had supported the measure, while white voters had opposed all four projects. The bond issue, which was delayed until August 1976, made the city the primary financier of the new building.

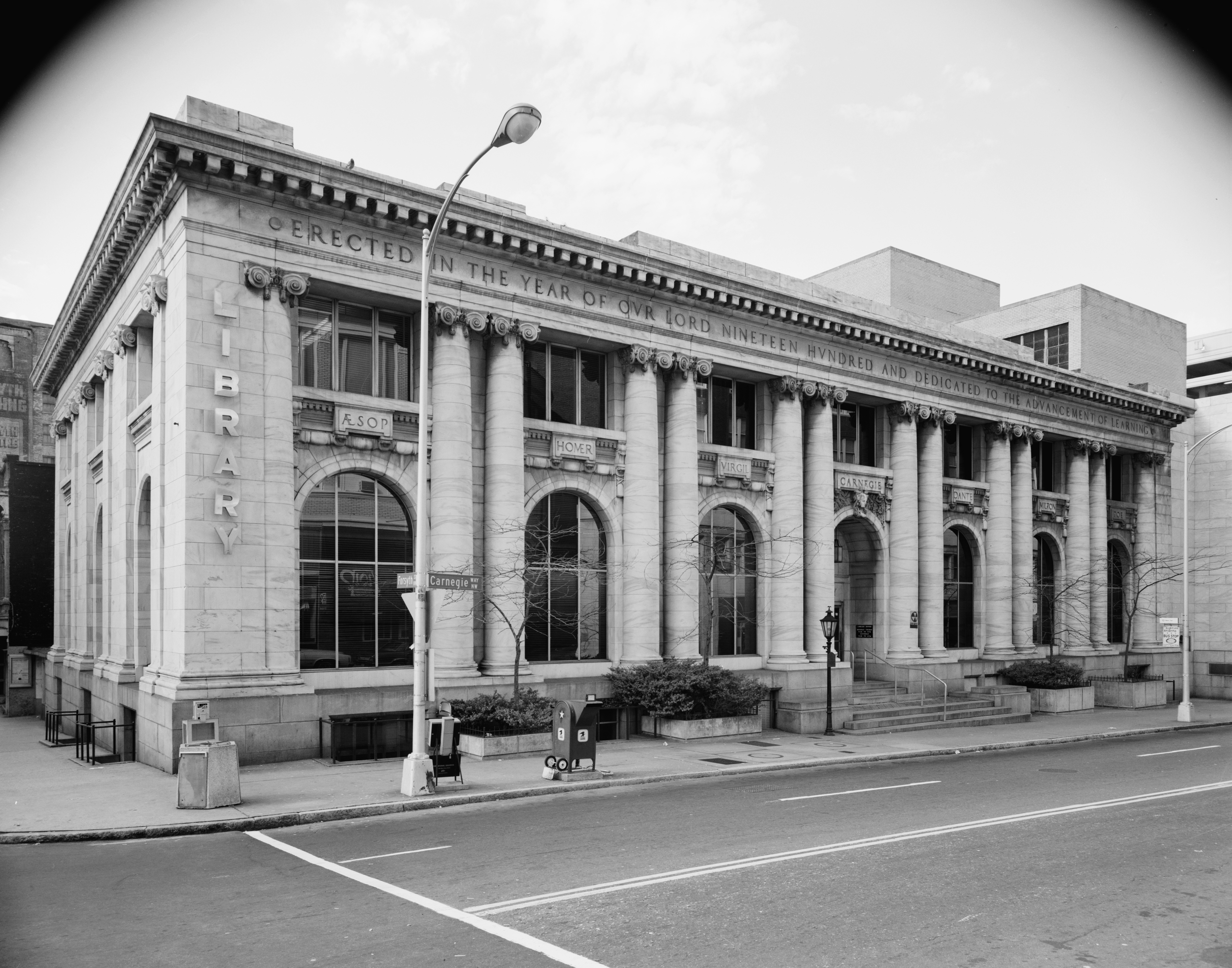
The Carnegie Library in 1976, just before its demolition

Work was delayed for several months while construction documents were prepared, and Breuer's firm redid the interior designs to accommodate additional uses. Both the library board and the City Council recommended that the new library be built on the Carnegie Library's site. In June 1976, Breuer's firm completed their revised plans, and the library board voted to temporarily relocate the Central Branch to 10 Pryor Street Southwest, where it was to occupy four floors. The engineering firm Stevens & Wilkinson created detailed drawings for the new building. Rochell resigned from the APL before work began, and his successor Ella Gaines Yates oversaw the building's continued development. The City Council approved the Central Branch's temporary relocation in October 1976, after alternate sites were rejected; the Carnegie Library closed in February 1977, and its functions were moved to Pryor Street. Two City Council members proposed renaming the new library after the activist W. E. B. Du Bois in May 1977, but the council rejected the proposal.

==== Construction ====
Work began in October 1977, with the project planned to take three years. The George Hyman Construction Co. and the Ozanne Construction Co, were hired as the general contractors. Despite an effort to save the Carnegie Library, that building was torn down to make way for Breuer's structure. Parts of the facade were salvaged, and the temporary Central Branch on Pryor Street used furniture from the old building; the time capsule from the original library was unsealed that December. With the Central Library's construction, the city government became more involved in the APL's operation, despite the trustees' objections. In early 1978, the APL board threatened to withdraw its involvement in the project following a dispute with the city government; the board had wanted to hire Breuer's firm to oversee construction, but the city disagreed.

Despite the dispute between the library board and the city, construction proceeded ahead of schedule. Hellmuth, Obata & Kassabaum and Jenkins-Fleming were hired as the interior design consultants. The library board had hired the two firms in exchange for getting the city government's approval to select a construction manager and add two more floors. The two additional floors were intended to accommodate future needs, as it would have disrupted library operations to construct the two floors after the building's completion. Yates, who oversaw even the most minute aspects of the building's construction, said that "this building is virtually hand-crafted in every respect", while an architect with Stevens and Wilkinson said that workers had "taken enormous pride" in the project. By early 1979, the facade was nearly completed, though the interior design consultants had not started work. Elected officials including Mayor Jackson toured the under-construction library that May.

The new Central Library included an electronic card catalog system to replace the old building's physical cards, as well as a minicomputer system for readers and another system to detect whether patrons had overdue books. These upgrades were funded by the 1975 bond issue. In September 1979, the library board's chairman suggested that the new building could open in phases; while several floors were ahead of schedule, other parts of the interior had been delayed. The temporary Central Library closed at the beginning of March 1980, though the Breuer building's opening was rescheduled multiple times. The building's contractors also threatened to sue the city government over the delays.

=== Opening and early years ===
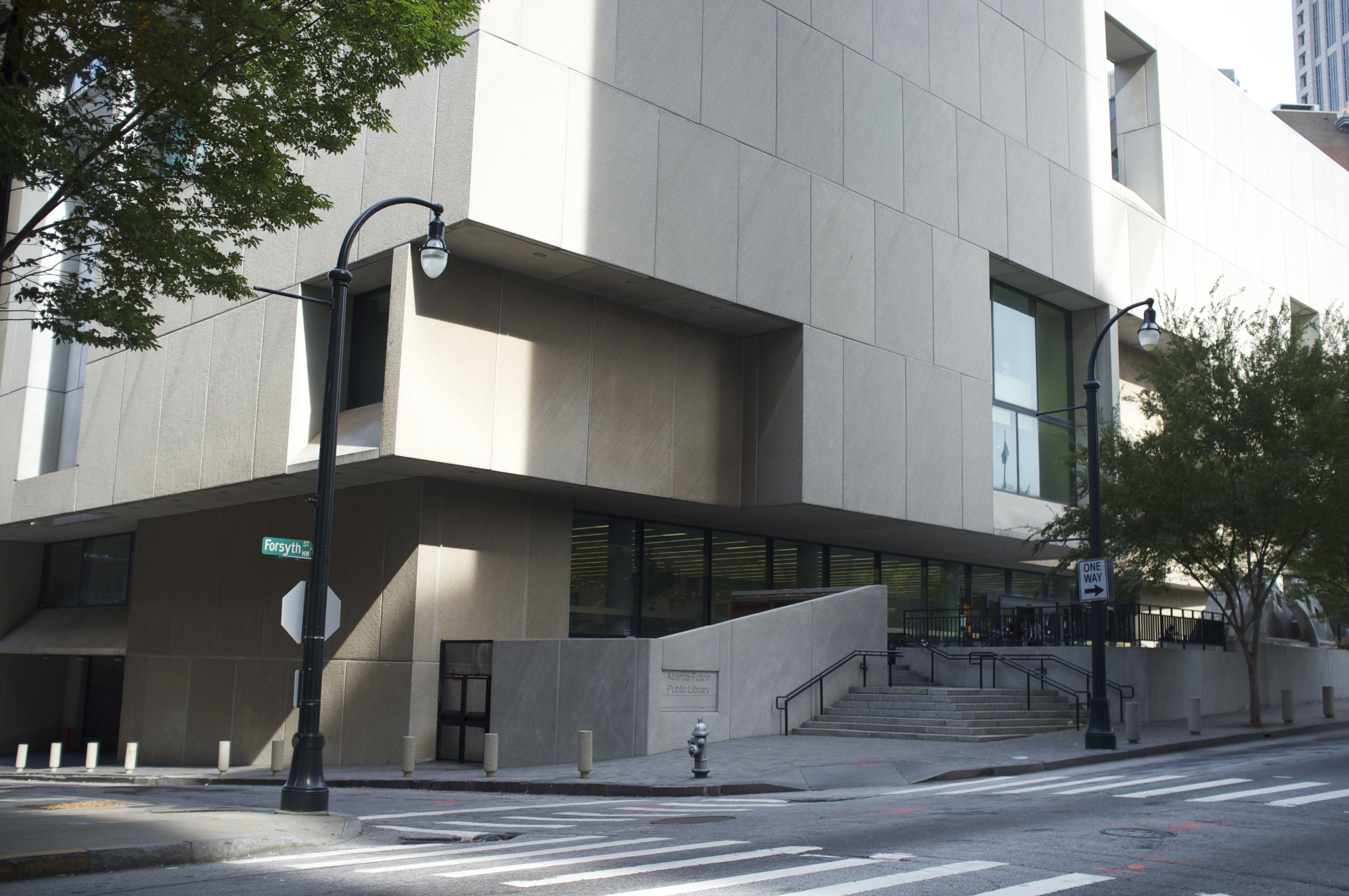
View of the building from the southern corner. The stairs ascend to the public outdoor plaza.

A preview event for the building was hosted on May 23, 1980, and the building was dedicated two days later on May 25. The ceremony included appearances from local politicians and a performance from the 214th U.S. Army Band; Breuer could not attend the dedication, dying a year later. Breuer's firm received an award of excellence from Atlanta's Design Commission for the building, which was the first major upgrade to the APL system in several decades. Initially, the Atlanta government owned the structure, while the Fulton County Commission operated it. With the new building's opening, the APL hired an Atlanta Police Department officer to enforce conduct rules there. The basement was incomplete when the building opened, and the top two stories were vacant; the basement cafeteria had opened by 1981.

The original bond issue had allocated $100,000 for artwork, and Breuer's partner Hamilton Smith had suggested that these funds, along with additional money raised by the APL, be used for a sculpture. Smith and Breuer had originally planned to commission Breuer's friend Alexander Calder, who had died before construction started. In the meantime, the $100,000 allocation had been depleted to pay for budget overruns, so the building initially had no artwork. The APL tried to commission a sculpture for the entrance plaza, but its trustees refused to commission any work from artists who had since died. As such, they rejected Hamilton Smith's suggestion to commission Calder; the APL wanted to hire Tony Smith (no relation), who died in 1980 after the APL's art committee rejected three of his proposals. The APL commissioned Richard Hunt to design a sculpture later the next year. The Fulton County Arts Council recommended in 1982 that two artworks from the unbuilt Atlanta Gateway Park be installed at the Central Library. The APL hosted a fundraiser the next year to raise funds for Hunt's sculpture, Wisdom Bridge, having raised $40,000 each from the city and county governments. The APL expanded to cover the rest of Fulton County in 1983, and all its branches became part of the Atlanta-Fulton Public Library System (formally the Fulton County Library System, or FCLS). Subsequently, the periodical collection was moved from the first to the fourth floors.

Voters approved a $38 million bond issue in 1985 to finance upgrades across the FCLS, including over $2 million for four projects at the Central Library. These projects included redesigning the plaza to discourage loitering, which frequently took place there, along with funds for finishing the top two floors. The bond issue also included funding for interior repairs and an expansion of the library's information bureau; these were part of a planned 30,000-square-foot (2,800 m^{2}) expansion of the building. The 1985 referendum included $200,000 for artwork at the Central Library, of which 80% went to Wisdom Bridge and 20% to artworks for the interior. Hunt modified his plans for Wisdom Bridge when it was incorporated into the plaza redesign; the project, announced in April 1988, also included new plantings and steps. The plaza renovation began that October, and Wisdom Bridge was dedicated on August 1, 1990.

The Central Library, the FCLS's busiest branch in the 1980s, had been surpassed by two suburban branches by the early 1990s. Some of the fifth-floor special collections were relocated to the fourth floor in 1993. The African-American collection was relocated to the Auburn Avenue Library, which opened the next year. The theater was closed during the mid-1990s after water from a leaking concrete planter caused parts of the ceiling to collapse. The Central Library was temporarily closed during the 1996 Summer Olympics, which was hosted in Atlanta. Although the restaurant was busy and successful during the building's early years, the FCLS board terminated the restaurant's lease in 1998 in an unsuccessful attempt to lease the space to a higher-paying tenant. The theater and restaurant remained empty for several years, while the building deteriorated. The building needed an estimated $7.6 million in upgrades by 1998, less than two decades after its completion.

=== 21st century ===
==== 2000–2007: Initial renovation ====
The Gates Foundation provided a grant in early 2000 for the construction of a youth computer center on the fourth floor, and a teenagers' computer center on the third floor opened that October. After several white librarians at the Central Library were relocated to smaller branch libraries, eight of them sued the FCLS for discrimination the same year, receiving a multimillion-dollar judgment. In 2001, the FCLS announced plans to renovate the building for $3 million, at which point the Central Library had significantly lower patronage and circulation than the main libraries of similarly-sized American cities. By then, although the Central Library's patronage had increased slightly, the lawsuit had negatively impacted the library system's reputation.

Renovations began in September 2001 with the closure of the genealogy department, and other departments and the outdoor plaza were also closed that year. After the genealogy section reopened the following January, workers removed obsolete or damaged volumes from the collection, despite objections from some FCLS employees. The FCLS also redecorated the interiors in a more colorful palette, repainting walls and ordering a new carpet with colorful highlights. The shelves were temporarily removed during the renovation; when some of the newly reinstalled shelves collapsed in late 2002, parts of the building were closed off while the shelves were secured. The changes, costing $5 million, were mostly cosmetic; a full renovation would have cost $34 million. The interior renovation was completed in 2004, but the FCLS wanted to renovate the exterior as well, proposing an additional $21 million upgrade in 2006. In the long run, it remained unclear what would happen to the Breuer building, and a moratorium on new hiring had left dozens of vacant positions at the Central Library by the mid-2000s.

==== 2008–2016: Demolition plans ====
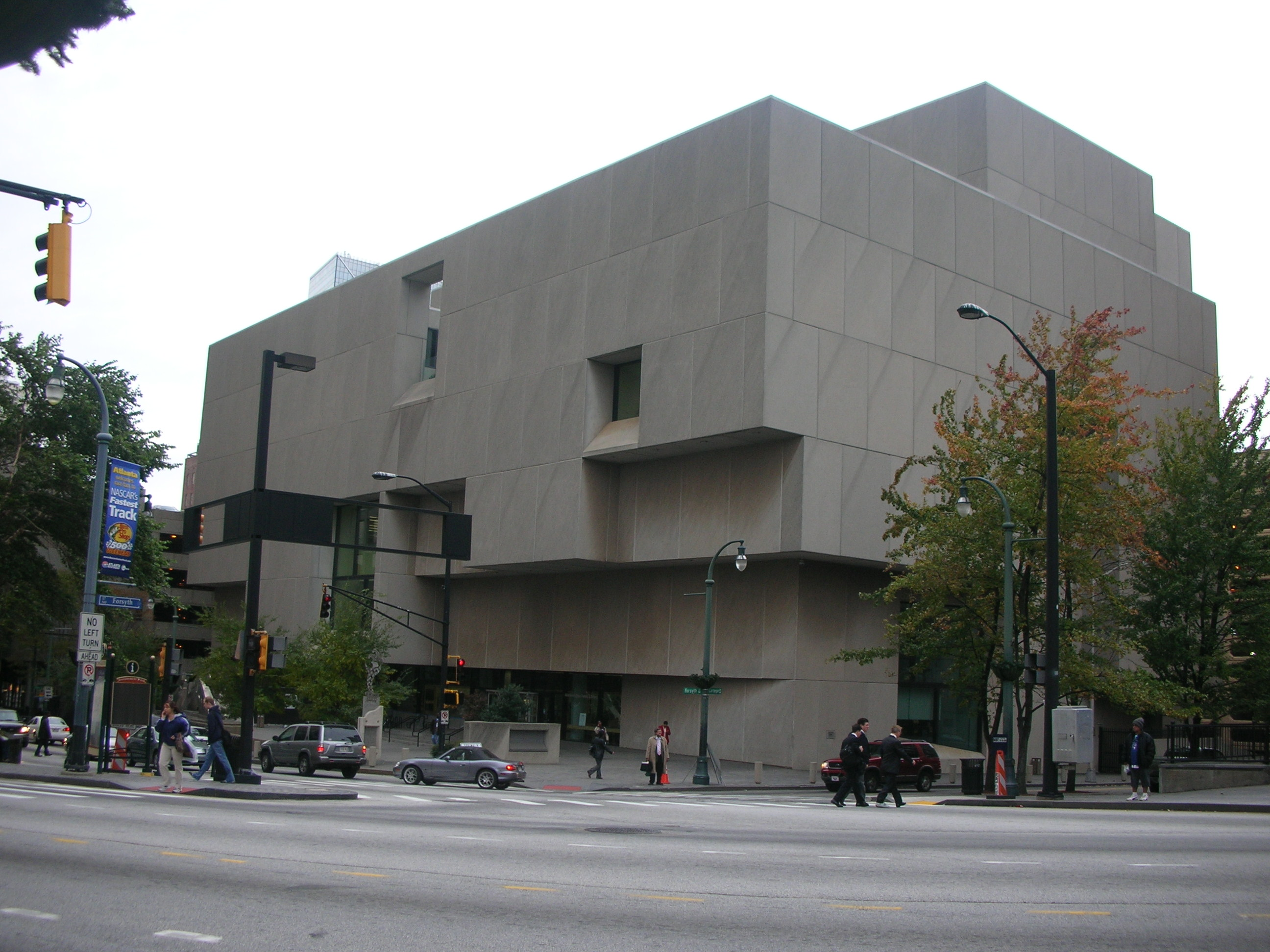
The building before its 2020s renovation

By 2008, the FCLS was considering renovating the Central Library, but Fulton County commissioner Robb Pitts instead advocated for its demolition and replacement. At a referendum that November, voters approved a $275 million bond issue for the FCLS, which included $85 million for replacing the Central Library. Although the bond issue initially included about $34 million for the Central Library's renovation, Pitts made a last-minute change increasing that amount. To receive the full funding, the FCLS had to raise matching funds from private sources. If the matching funds could not be raised in five years, the Central Library would be renovated instead. FCLS director John Szabo and supporters of a new building said that the project would attract visitors, but Szabo also said a new building would solve only some of the FCLS's issues.

A blog advocating for the building's preservation was established, and the library was listed on the World Monuments Fund's 2010 Watch List of Most Endangered Sites. By 2011, the replacement of the Central Library and the FCLS's other projects had been delayed due to the Great Recession. Homeless people frequently congregated at the building by the early 2010s, prompting some other patrons to avoid it. When the Auburn Avenue Library closed for a renovation in 2014, part of the collection was temporarily moved back to the Central Library; this relocation lasted two years.

Proposals to replace the Central Library resurfaced in early 2016, when the library system's chairwoman proposed reallocating some of the building's $85 million allocation to other branches, while using the remaining funds to build a downsized main branch. At the time, the Central Library was not among the FCLS's ten busiest branches, and the library system's directors wanted to focus on outlying branches. The structure had fallen into disrepair, with broken doors, malfunctioning elevators, and a leaking roof. Members of the public signed petitions and left public comments advocating for preservation. A panel discussion on the building's future, involving Pitts, the library's director, and two people who supported preservation, was hosted in May. The next month, the Atlanta City Council approved a nonbinding resolution endorsing a "new Central Library" in the site, prompting outcry from local residents and preservationists; the resolution's sponsor later clarified that he had only wanted the branch to remain downtown.

==== 2016–present: Renovation and reopening ====
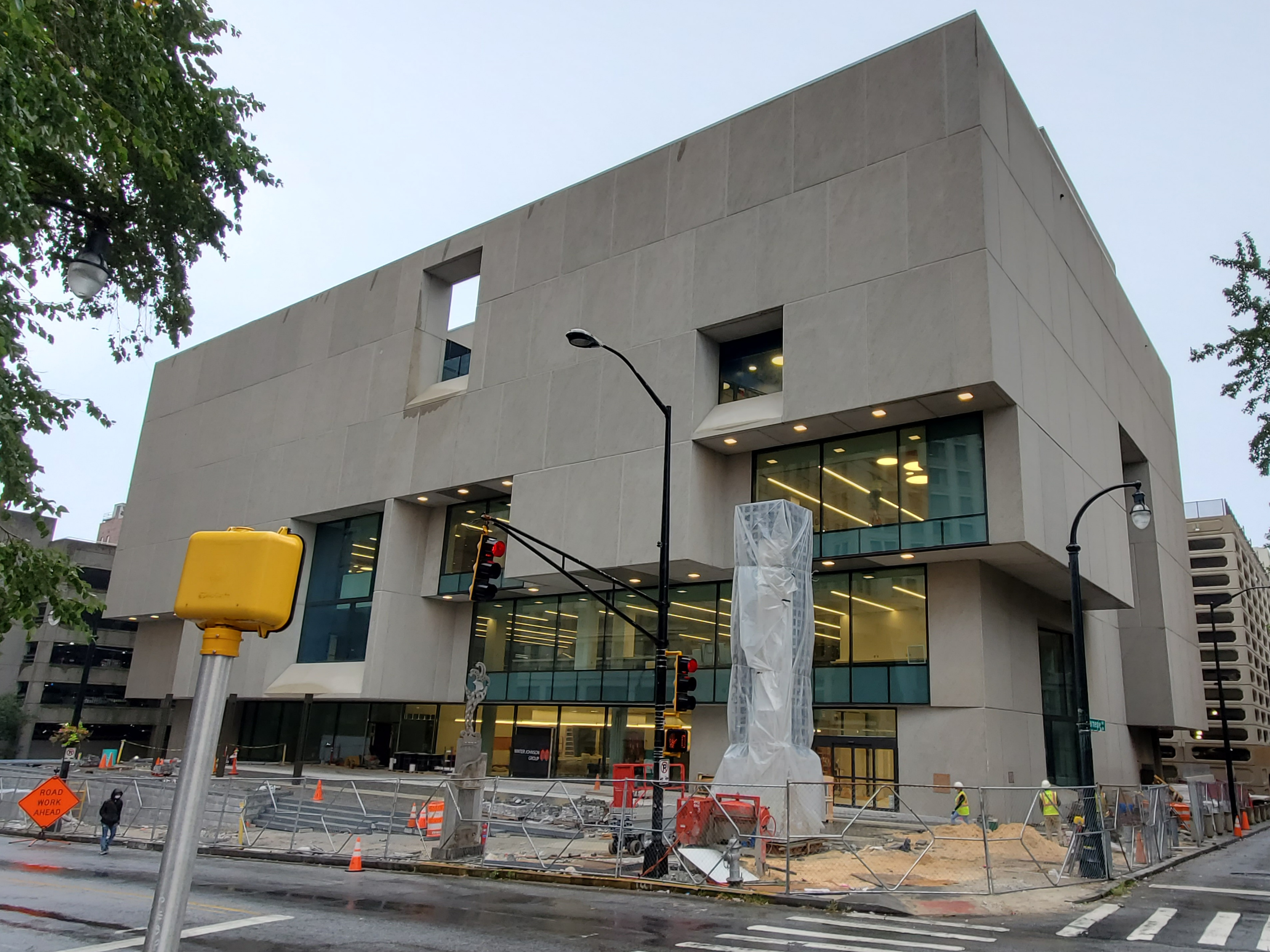
The building during its renovation

The Fulton County Board of Commissioners, which was loath to spend money on a new location, passed a resolution in July 2016 mandating the existing building's renovation. The plan allocated $55 million for upgrades, and the architecture firm Praxis3 and the nonprofit group Architecture and Design Center were tasked with creating preliminary plans. Moody Nolan was the architect of record for the renovation, which was led by architectural firm Cooper Carry and Vines Architecture. Due to concerns that the renovation would significantly alter the existing design, the building was included on the Georgia Trust for Historic Preservation's 2017 "Places in Peril" list. Designs took more than a year, and Cooper Carry presented the plans to the public in April 2018. The plans involved adding large windows to the facade, prompting criticism.

The building was closed in July 2018 for renovations, and the county commission approved a $44.2 million renovation contract the next month. During the Central Library's closure, the FCLS loaned laptops to patrons in the nearby Woodruff Park, and patrons were allowed to access some of the Central Library's collections digitally. Exterior work began in mid-2019. The project included adding windows, upgrading mechanical systems, adding a rooftop event space, and rearranging the interiors. Some space was to be rented to external tenants, including artists-in-residence. Although the Central Library was nominated to the NRHP, the National Park Service was reluctant to designate the building because of concerns that the facade modifications would not retain the building's historic integrity. The project retained about 95% of the original design details.

The renovation ultimately cost $50 million. With the work largely complete by early 2021, it reopened on October 5. The project received an award of merit from the Engineering News-Record's Southeast chapter, and the building received a LEED Gold green building certification from the U.S. Green Building Council.

== Architecture ==
Marcel Breuer designed the Central Library with Hamilton Smith; they worked in conjunction with associate architect and engineering firm Stevens & Wilkinson. It was Breuer's only design in Georgia, his last design to be completed before his death, and among his final works overall. According to Smith, the building's design was intended to be functional, despite its monolithic design. The interiors were mostly designed by Hellmuth, Obata & Kassabaum and Jenkins-Fleming, although Breuer was responsible for the auditorium.

=== Exterior ===
The library building measures 130 feet (40 m) tall, while its largest floors measure 160 by 190 feet (49 by 58 m) across. It has an inverted massing, or general shape, with the upper levels cantilevering above the lower stories in a manner similar to Breuer's previous Whitney Museum of Art building. The Forsyth Street (southeast) elevation steps outward at three levels, protruding a total of 24 feet (7.3 m), while the northeast and southwest elevations each step outward once, protruding by 8 feet (2.4 m).

The exterior is composed of precast concrete panels with diagonal striations, which were bush-hammered after being cast, giving them a rough texture. Concrete was chosen because its malleability allowed recessed windows and splayed reveals in irregular shapes, because of its rugged quality, and because it was significantly cheaper than conventional stone. Each panel measures 15 feet (4.6 m) high, the same height as each of the stories. Some of the panels have L-shaped cross-sections, wrapping around corners. These panels gave the building a monumental appearance while eliminating the need for traditional masonry, which would have required structural reinforcement, had a visible cross-section, and weathered unevenly. John Poros, one of Breuer's biographers, wrote that the building appeared to be carved out of a single block of concrete rather than being cobbled together from several structures.

The original design was largely windowless; one of the few windows on Forsyth Street had a square window facing Margaret Mitchell Square, which measured 25 feet (7.6 m) to a side. Another trapezoidal window, on Carnegie Way, overlooks a staircase between the basement and second floor. The windows are much larger than in comparable buildings, a design feature intended to attract visitors. At Forsyth Street and Carnegie Way, there is a diagonal cutaway below the second floor, one of the only places in the building where a diagonal design feature was used. Additional gaps or window openings are located at the centers of each of the facade's elevations. At the top of the Forsyth Street elevation, above the main entrance at the center of that elevation, is a blank opening, which overlooks an outdoor space on the upper stories. The 2021 renovation added more windows; The Architect's Newspaper wrote that the poorly-lit interiors originally drove away potential patrons.

Due to the site's slope, there are entrances at both the basement and first stories. The first-story entrance on Forsyth Street has a wide brick-paved plaza, which contains Richard Hunt's steel sculpture Wisdom Bridge (1990). This plaza is bounded by slanted, bush-hammered walls. At the building's southern corner is a staircase descending to the basement, which crosses underneath a stair ascending to the main entrance. There is a drive-through window for dropping off books, abutting the basement on Fairlie Street to the northwest. The Fairlie Street facade also contains loading docks and adjoins a maintenance space.

=== Interior ===
As built, the Central Library had 250,000 square feet (23,000 m^{2}), spread across eight above-ground floors and two basements. The height between each floor slab is 15 feet (4.6 m), but the ceiling heights are shorter since the interiors use dropped ceilings of 10 to 12 feet (3.0 to 3.7 m). The building was built to accommodate 1,000 patrons simultaneously, with space for 1 million volumes. The superstructure consists of a steel frame and concrete slabs; the steel frame is encased by concrete columns, which are arranged in a grid of 30-by-45-foot (9.1 by 13.7 m) rectangles. An electronic computer system cam close off parts of the library in case of an emergency.

==== Layout ====
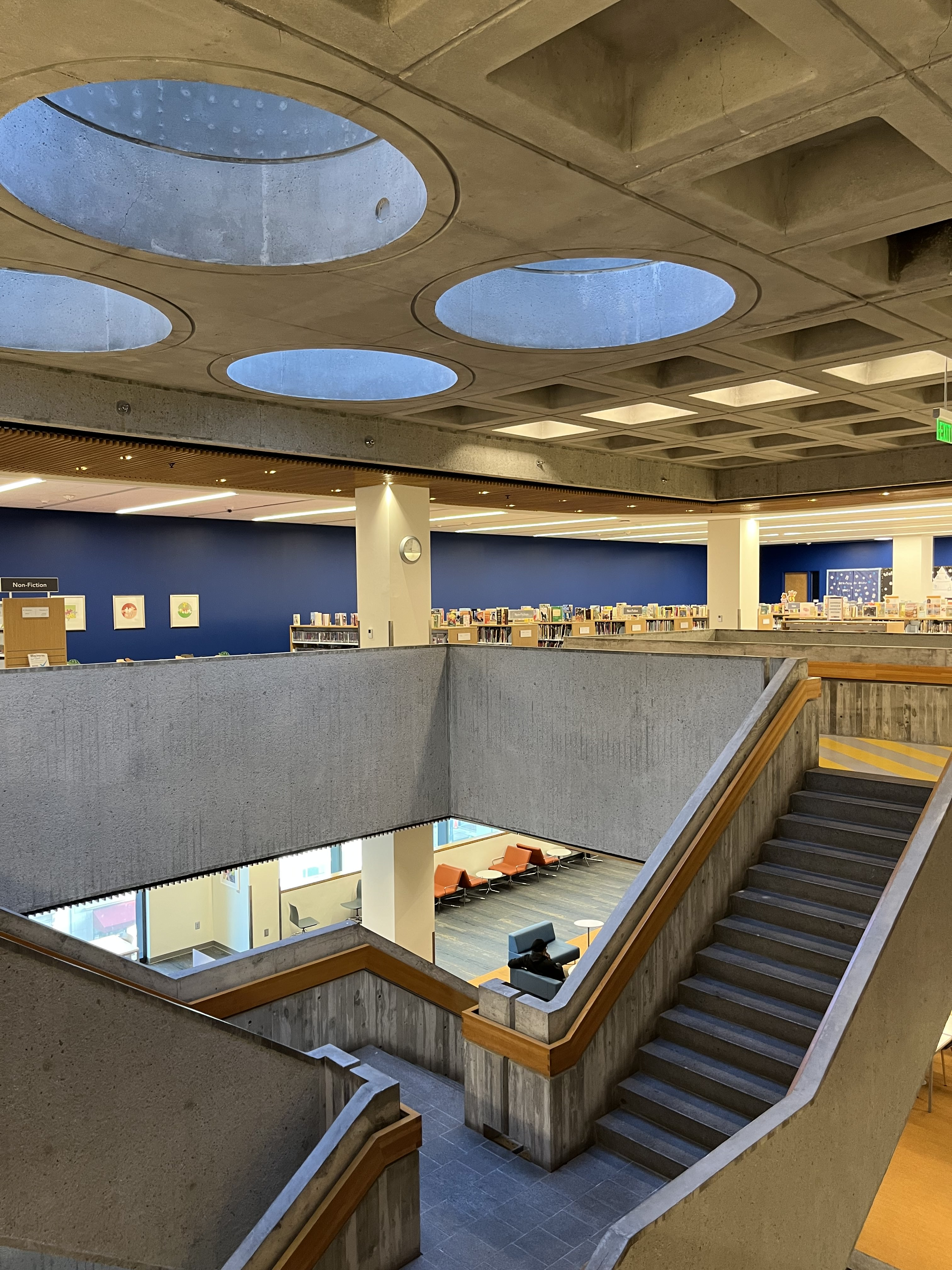
Upper floor of the Central Library

There is a bank of elevators on the wall of the main lobby, which do not serve the top floor. The original design included additional elevators at the center of the building, which were relocated in the 2021 renovation. A book-conveyor belt connects the first-floor general reference areas with the upper floors. A staircase connects the basement, first, and second stories and is situated behind the elevators. Another staircase, added in 2021, leads to a central staircase on the second through fourth floors. This central staircase, designed by Breuer, consists of pairs of concrete steps, arranged in a scissor layout. There are four round skylights in the ceiling above the stairs. An outdoor stair connects the fourth floor to the upper stories.

The interior decorations were mostly colorless, with features such as earth-toned floors that gave a warm ambiance. Colorful decorations were added in the 2000s renovation. As part of the 2021 renovation, interior circulation was rearranged, and the building was expanded to 272,000 square feet (25,300 m^{2}). The 2021 renovation also added colorful movable furniture.

==== Rooms ====
The arrangement of the interior forms a vertical procession that encouraged occupants to ascend from the lower to the upper stories, like earlier Beaux-Arts structures but unlike Breuer's earlier multistory buildings. The two basement levels contain a garage and storage space. The first basement includes the maintenance spaces, a cafeteria, exhibition space, and an auditorium, along with a reading room and card catalog. The auditorium contained 340 or 350 seats. In addition, the basement originally contained the children's department. On the first floor is a central 100-by-130-foot (30 by 40 m) room, which has a general reference department, flanked by a gift shop and a newspaper reference library. (Note: In news reports about the Atlanta Central Library, the Atlanta Constitution uses modified cardinal directions, which are rotated 45 degrees clockwise from the original directions (for example, the northeastern elevation is described as facing "north"). In this article, the precise cardinal directions are used.) The lobby has a ceiling measuring 12 feet (3.7 m) high, and there is an atrium above it, which contains the artwork Tree of Light by the art collective Luftwerk.

The second and fourth stories contain the general reading rooms and are divided into quadrants, separated by the gaps in the facade. The quadrants contain reading rooms and stacks; the reading rooms have low shelves, while the stacks are inaccessible to the public and are organized electronically. The ceilings are generally 12 feet (3.7 m) high. In the building's early years, the second floor generally contained business, government-archive, and STEM collections; the third floor included the travel and humanities collections; and the fourth floor had arts and film collections. The fourth floor has a soundproof music-listening room, and it has housed the relocated children's department from 2021 onward. The children's department contains tiles depicting the Uncle Remus folktale, salvaged from the Carnegie Library. A Veiled Rebecca statue from the old Carnegie Library was originally displayed on the fourth floor before being removed in 1983.

The upper stories were originally administrative spaces, with ceilings measuring 10 feet (3.0 m) high. When the building was completed, the fifth floor housed the special collections, an employee lounge, and technical offices. The fifth floor also has a recessed, double-height outdoor courtyard, whose floor is partially composed of the skylights above the fourth floor's ceiling. Originally, the fifth floor displayed a bust salvaged from the old library, depicting Andrew Carnegie. The sixth floor was used by administrative offices for the library system and the Friends of the Atlanta Public Library, and there were two unused attic floors at the time of construction. There were also a dozen meeting rooms with capacities of 10–300 people apiece. After the 2020s renovation, the fifth and sixth stories became an event space, which contains kitchens, a courtyard, and an auditorium. This event space required adding two large beams to support a new roof.

== Collection ==
When the Central Library opened, it had 350,000 volumes. The collection included volumes in 23 languages by the mid-2000s. The library had other forms of print and audiovisual media such as newspapers, films, and tape recordings. There were collections of artworks, cassettes, films, and equipment, which patrons were allowed to borrow. The library building also hosted workshops, board games, and a reference desk, and the Friends of the Atlanta Public Library operated the gift shop.

The Central Library houses the Fulton County Public Library's special collections, which the general public could access. As of 2025, these included the Georgia Collection, the genealogy collection, the library system's archives, and the rare-book and city-directory collections. The Hattie Wilson High Genealogical Collection contains documents relating to family histories in the Southern United States, particularly Georgia. The Margaret Mitchell Collection was donated to the Central Library in 1954. The Mitchell Collection includes objects relating to the novelist and journalist Margaret Mitchell, including books that she consulted at the Carnegie Library, along with objects that are rotated in and out of public display. such as her awards, typewriter, and library card. The Samuel Williams collection of African-American work was housed at the Central Library from 1970 until it was relocated to the Auburn Avenue Research Library in 1994.

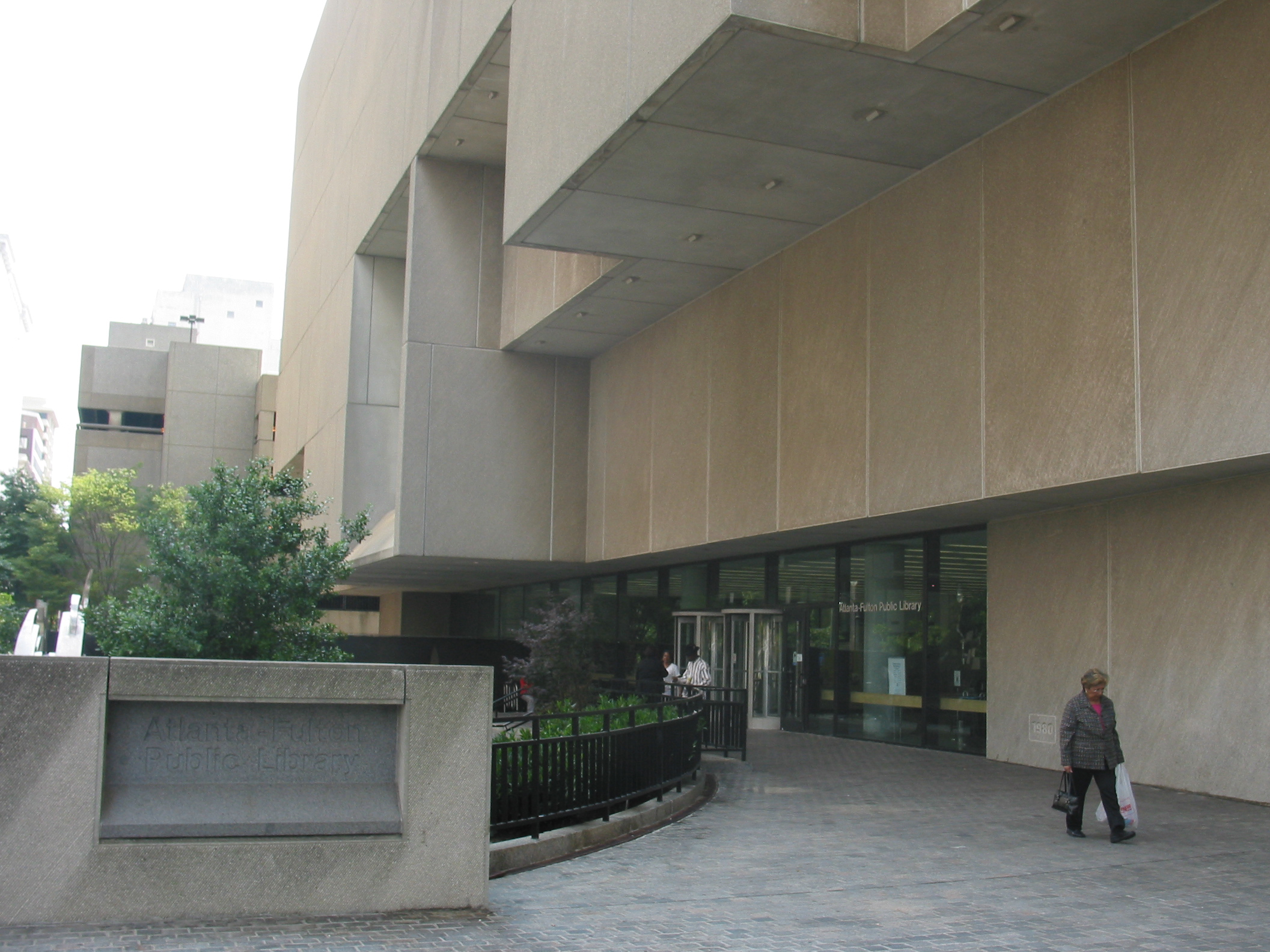
The Central Library's entrance

== Reception and media coverage ==
When the library bond issue was approved in 1975, The Atlanta Constitution wrote that the design resembled "an oversized cinderblock with apertures". The same newspaper wrote in 1979 that the building's design seemingly ran counter to Breuer's Bauhaus principles, in that it did not strictly adhere to the philosophy that form follows function, but that it appeared like a modern version of Baroque architecture. A model of the building was displayed at Georgia Tech in 1978 and at Berlin's Bauhaus Archive the next year. A writer for the Miami Herald compared Breuer's APL building to his firm's later Broward County Library but that only the Atlanta building was "monumental", despite the buildings' similar shapes and materials. The Architectural Record wrote the same year that the building was "precast concrete, sculptural, tough but elegantly tough" like many of Breuer's other projects, while The Atlanta Journal said the massing exemplified Breuer's beliefs about "the civilizing of technology".

Retrospectively, the building's design was well-received in the architectural community, but the public disliked its brutalist style and the lack of windows. The writer John Poros wrote that the building's completion was "part of a long search" in the evolution of Breuer's work, despite having been completed just as postmodern architecture was becoming popular. The Central Library was described as a masterpiece by Barry Bergdoll, the Chief Architectural Curator of the Museum of Modern Art. Hyperallergic wrote that the building's windows "angle as elegantly as those at the Met Breuer", the former Whitney building, even as his buildings did not meet classical expectations of beauty. The Vitra Design Museum included the building, along with several others, in a traveling exhibition on Breuer's work. The museum wrote that the Central Library, New York City's Begrisch Hall, Rotterdam's De Bijenkorf store, and the Whitney building were particularly distinctively shaped.

When the Central Library's demolition was proposed, County Commissioner Robb Pitts claimed that the Breuer building was dark and unwelcoming, and he likened the building to a jail. Cynthia Rogers of the Atlanta Journal-Constitution wrote that none of the reasons cited for the building's demolition were compelling, and local architect Bobbie Unger said that, despite the building's formidable appearance, it needed to be saved because Atlanta lacked other examples of such buildings. The website ArtsATL wrote in 2016 that the building was imposing and highly controversial, but that the arrangement of the design details was appealing when examined more closely, saying that merely demolishing the building "is shortsighted at best and downright flippant at worst". When the building reopened in 2021, a writer for Georgia Trend said that it "is modern, it is futuristic, it looks like science fiction", drawing the attention of passersby, while another writer said the renovation alluded to the original architecture without following it exactly.

== See also ==
- List of Marcel Breuer works
- List of Brutalist architecture in the United States
