= Henri Jova =

American architect (1919–2014)

Henri Vatable Jova
- Born: May 11, 1919; Newburgh, New York, U.S.
- Died: January 13, 2014 (age 94); West Palm Beach, Florida, U.S.
- Occupation: Architect
- Known for: Colony Square, Carter Center, Carnegie Education Pavilion
- Spouse: David Rinehart

Henri Vatable Jova (1919-2014) was an American architect and preservationist. With Stanley Daniels and John Busby, he founded Jova/Daniels/Busby, a multidisciplinary design firm based in Atlanta, Georgia, which designed several notable projects in Atlanta and throughout the Southeast from 1966 to 2013. Jova is noted for his pioneering support of mixed-use development and interest in the development of Midtown Atlanta.

== Background and early career ==
Jova was born into a prominent European/Caribbean family. His grandfather, Juan Jacinto Jova y Gonzalez-Abreu, had immigrated from Cuba to New York City in 1874 as a sugar broker, then gone into brickmaking around 1884; his father, Juan Louis Jova, was a ceramic engineer and director of the plant. His grandmother, Marie Gabrielle Vatable, originally of Basse-Terre, was a sister of Baron Louis François Vatable, the French governor-general of Guadeloupe. The Marques Sabas Marin, another great-uncle, was governor-general of Cuba and Puerto Rico. His mother, Maria Gonzalez Fernandez Cavada, was the daughter of a Spanish diplomat, and a great-great-niece to Federico Fernández Cavada, commander of the Cuban insurrectionists against Spain in the Ten Years' War.

Jova attended Cornell University, where he joined Lambda Chi Alpha. World War II interrupted his education, and he served in the U.S. Army Combat Engineers in the South Pacific theater. He became a fellow of the American Academy in Rome in 1949, winning its prestigious Rome Prize for architecture in 1951.

He worked as a designer for Harrison & Abramovitz in New York City from 1952 to 1954, then relocated to Atlanta seeking a less frantic lifestyle. He joined his first cousin's firm, Abreu & Robeson, and served as their chief of design from 1954 to 1966.

== Relocation to Midtown ==
In 1960, Jova moved to Midtown Atlanta, at the time in decline. Seeing potential in the neighborhood, he became a major promoter, encouraging friends and colleagues to relocate there. He organized the Midtown Neighborhood Association in 1963, and sponsored a home improvement contest, judged by mayor Ivan Allen Jr., to encourage owners to invest in their properties. Jova himself bought and renovated several properties on Seventh Street and Mentelle Drive.

== Jova/Daniels/Busby ==
In 1966, he joined fellow Midtown residents Stanley Daniels and John Busby to form Jova/Daniels/Busby, which became known for fusing classical element with modern designs.

Jova is well-known for the development of Colony Square at Peachtree Street and 14th, the first mixed-use development in the Southeastern United States, which opened in phases from 1969 to 1973. His design for the Carnegie Education Pavilion in Hardy Ivy Park (1996) and for the Carter Center (1986 and 1993) also received widespread attention. Jova was also lead designer for Atlanta City Hall (1991), Peachtree Road United Methodist Church Sanctuary (2002), the Atlanta Newspapers Building (1971), the Buckhead branch of what is now SunTrust Banks (1987), MARTA North Avenue station (1981), and the Robert Shaw Room for the Atlanta Symphony Orchestra (1983) as well as a number of single family homes and other projects. His work outside Atlanta includes four buildings for Southern Progress Corporation in Birmingham, Alabama (beginning in 1974), Day Butterfly Center at Callaway Gardens (1989); and the First Presbyterian Church in Dalton (1989).

His interior design work includes work for the Academy of Medicine, the corporate headquarters for BellSouth Enterprises, and for Robinson Humphrey Co. at the Atlanta Financial Center.

Jova stepped down as chair of Jova/Daniels/Busby in 2002. After retirement, he relocated to West Palm Beach, Florida with David Rinehart, his longtime partner, to whom he was wed only a few months before his death.
