= Auburn Avenue Research Library on African American Culture and History =

Library and archives in Atlanta, Georgia, United States

Coordinates: 33.7553°N 84.3839°W

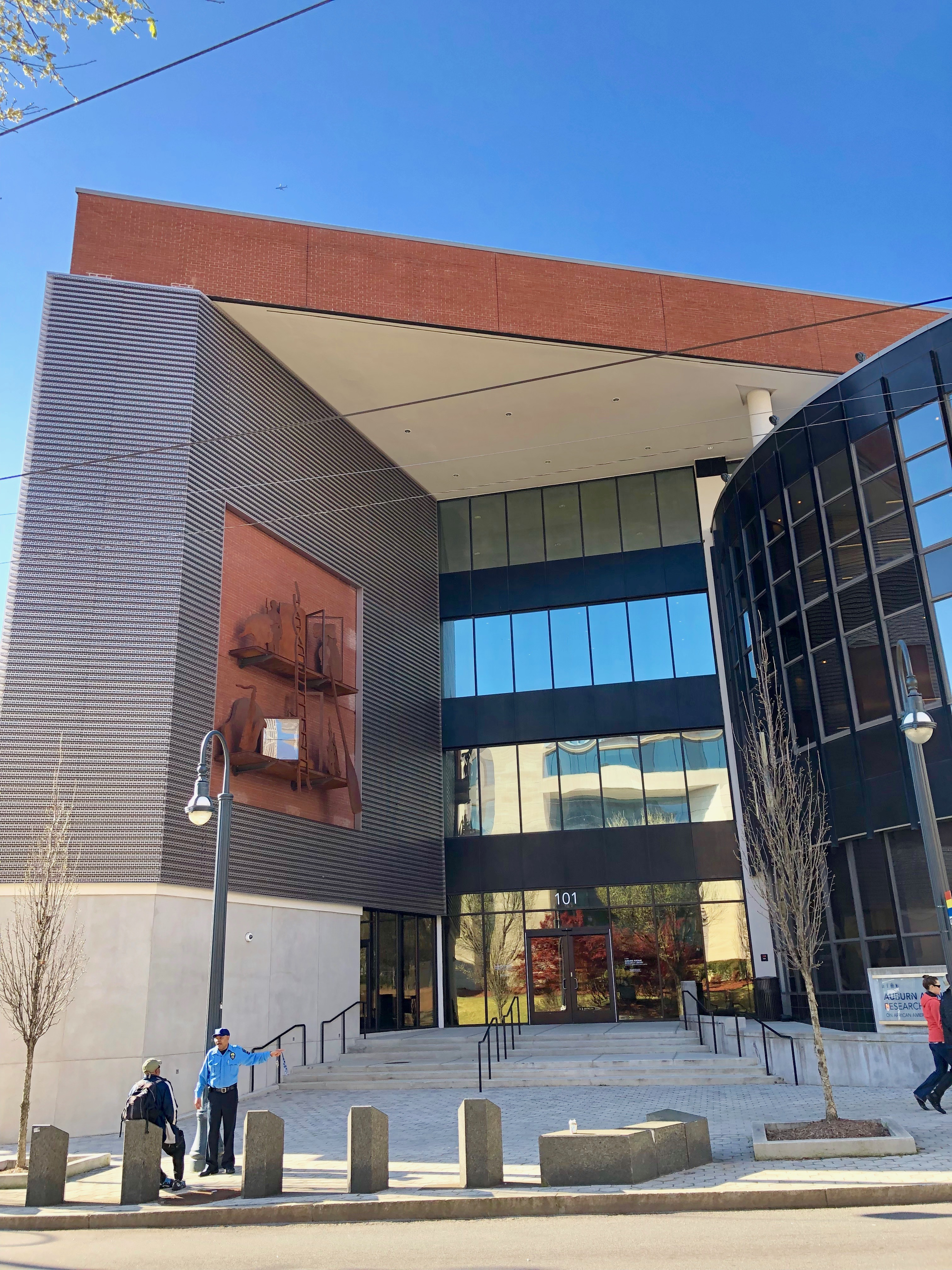
- The Auburn Avenue Research Library on African American Culture and History in 2019
- Location: Atlanta, Georgia, United States
- Type: Special library
- Established: 1994

Other information
- Website: www.fulcolibrary.org/aarl/

The Auburn Avenue Research Library on African American Culture and History is a special library within the Atlanta-Fulton Public Library System. It is in Atlanta's Sweet Auburn Historic District. The Auburn Avenue Research Library opened in 1994 as the first library in the Southeast to offer specialized reference and archival collections for the study and research of African American culture and history and of other peoples of African descent. Its collection was housed at other libraries and became known as the Samuel W. Williams Collection on Black America. The library re-opened in 2016 after being closed for about two years during a $20 million renovation.

Covering 50,000 square feet, the Auburn Avenue Research Library's four-story red-brick and black-granite building houses a library research area containing general reference books and materials, study areas, and a reading room as well as a public section with exhibit cases, general reference materials, and main reading room, and its archive of library stacks in the center of the building on the second and third floors.

The library is open to the public. Appointments are encouraged for access to its archival collections. In 2001, the Auburn Avenue Research Library on African American Culture and History received a Governor's Award in the Humanities.

== History ==
Its core collection was established at the Auburn Branch of the Carnegie Library of Atlanta that opened in 1921 and was Atlanta's first public library branch for African Americans. "Due to Jim Crow laws, African Americans were denied public library services established in 1902. The Auburn branch was opened with Carnegie Corporation funds despite Carnegie's offer to fund a branch for the city's large black population as early as 1908. From the time that the library opened in 1921 until it closed in 1959 numerous African American women librarians managed the library. The two most notable among them were Alice Dugged Cary and Annie L. McPheeters. McPheeters was crucial in the development of the core collection known as, the Negro History Collection. The library opened on May 14, 1994, with 50,000 square feet of space at a cost of $10 million. It became the second public library in the United States focused on black history and culture. The renovation completed in 2016, led by Perkins and Will, expanded the library to 106,500 square feet. In 2019, the Auburn Avenue Research Library celebrated its 25th anniversary at its current address.

== Collections ==
The library has three divisions: Reference and Research, Archives, and Program & Outreach. Reference and Research maintains sources related to the study of African American culture and the African diaspora. Archives holds records related to African American culture and history, primarily in the Atlanta area. The Program and Outreach division hosts public events to highlight the library's collections. The Library's archives are home to the Andrew J Young Papers, the Atlanta Life Insurance Company Records, and the National Conclave of Grady Graduate Nurses Collection.

== See also ==
- African American Library at the Gregory School
- Schomburg Center for Research in Black Culture
- Moorland–Spingarn Research Center
- Amistad Research Center
