= Japanese School of Detroit =

Supplementary educational school

- デトロイトりんご会補習授業校

Location
- Location of the school office in Novi
- 25345 Taft Road; Novi, Michigan, 48374; United States; 42°28′32″N 83°29′52″W

Information
- Other name: Detroit Ringo Kai
- Type: Japanese supplementary school
- Established: 1973
- Website: ringokai.org

The Japanese School of Detroit (JSD) (デトロイトりんご会補習授業校, Detoroito Ringo Kai Hoshū Jugyō Kō) is a Saturday-only Japanese supplementary educational school in Metro Detroit. It is often called "Ringo Kai." As of December 2011 it has almost 800 students. The school office is located in Novi Meadows Elementary School, which is the class location of the preschool and elementary school levels. Middle and high school classes are held at Novi High School.

The purpose of the Japanese School of Detroit is to provide Japanese children with opportunities to learn the supplementary curricula of the Japanese education in the Japanese language while they stay in the U.S., so that children will adapt themselves back into the Japanese educational environment without much difficulty when they return to Japan. Japanese families stay in the U.S. for 3–5 years on average.

As of 2015 it is the world's third largest hoshūkō.

== History ==
It was founded in 1973 by the local Japanese companies, with the first classes being held at Cranbrook Schools Brookside. At first only 23 children were enrolled Volunteers established the Japanese Society of Detroit to operate the school.

It moved to Kensington Academy in October 1981. In April 1987 it opened its classes at Seaholm High School in Birmingham, and in April 1989 it opened classes at Covington School in Birmingham. In 1990 it offered Japanese culture and Japanese language classes on Saturdays.

In 1996 it had 800 students with 43 classrooms in use at not only Seaholm but also at West Maple Elementary School, making it the largest of the weekend schools for Asian American populations.

In 1999 the executive office moved from International Academy to the former Oakland Steiner School in Rochester Hills.

In 2008 the JSD had 1,012 students, with 115 being in Kindergarten, 690 being in elementary school (grades 1–6), 158 being in junior high school (grades 7–9) and 49 being in high school (10-12). Prior to the move, students of the JSD in Kindergarten through 3rd grades took their JSD classes at West Maple Elementary School in Birmingham while students in grades 4 through 12 took their classes at Seaholm High School. At the time the school offices were in the former Kensington Academy campus in Bloomfield Township, and later in Birmingham.

In 2010, the JSD announced that it was relocating to Novi, Michigan. It entered into a 10-year agreement with the Novi Community School District and began to use Novi Meadows Elementary School to conduct classes. It moved from Birmingham to Novi in the northern hemisphere summer of 2011. Novi Schools Superintendent Steve Matthews said that he expected for the Japanese population in the school district to increase due to the move of JSD.

== Operations ==
As of 2012, the school has about 800 students from kindergarten through high school. There is a principal and two assistant principals who are assigned to the school by the Japanese government. During their 3-year term, they take leadership positions as administrators to maintain the school with support from many volunteer parents.

Classes are held on 42 Saturdays a year at the Japanese school. On a typical Saturday, the 1st hour starts from 9:00 AM. There are more than 6 periods within the day, and there are a few recesses and a lunch hour. Students are dismissed after 3:00 PM. Children are driven by their parents from as far as South Lyon, Ann Arbor, Lake Orion, and Windsor in Canada. There is even a family from Midland. As of 2011, and some students come from Lansing. The school year starts in April and ends in March, as in Japan.

All instruction is given completely in the Japanese language using the same text books as those used by children in Japan. At the lower elementary level mainly the Japanese language and math are taught. Social studies is added from 4th grade, and science is added from the 7th. At the high school level, Math, English, History, Modern Japanese as well as Classic Japanese are offered.

School events that are unique to schools in Japan are emphasized, such as Sports Festival, Ceremonies of the first day and the last day of school, and the Graduation ceremonies.

== See also ==
- History of the Japanese in Metro Detroit
- Consulate-General of Japan, Detroit
- Niji-Iro Japanese Immersion Elementary School
- Hinoki International School
- Sundai Michigan International Academy
- Japanese language education in the United States
