= History of the Japanese in Metro Detroit =

In 2002, there were 6,413 people of Japanese origin, including Japanese citizens and Japanese Americans, in the Wayne-Oakland-Macomb tri-county area in Metro Detroit, making them the fifth-largest Asian ethnic group there. In that year, within an area stretching from Sterling Heights to Canton Township in the shape of a crescent, most of the ethnic Japanese lived in the center. In 2002, the largest populations of ethnic Japanese people were located in Novi and West Bloomfield Township. In April 2013, the largest Japanese national population in the State of Michigan was in Novi, with 2,666 Japanese residents. West Bloomfield had the third-largest Japanese population and Farmington Hills had the fourth largest Japanese population.

== History ==
The first Japanese people came to Detroit in 1892. There were no particular waves of immigration.

However, after World War II ended and the Japanese internment camps were disbanded, the first significant wave of those with Japanese origins came to Metro Detroit, with many coming from California. By 1951, there were about 900 Japanese in Detroit. A concentration of Japanese existed in Highland Park and others were throughout the city of Detroit.

Shotaro Nakahama (中浜 昭太郎, Nakahama Shōtarō), the executive director of the Japan Business Society of Detroit (デトロイト日本商工会 Detoroito Nihon Shōkōkai), stated that in the 1970s many of the first Japanese groups settled in the Troy area. According to Nakahama, as time passed, additional rental apartments, condominiums, and houses opened first in areas such as Walled Lake and West Bloomfield and later in the Ann Arbor and Novi areas, so the Japanese population moved to the west.

The Japanese Society of Detroit formed around 1972. The Japanese School of Detroit was founded in 1973 by local Japanese companies. That year, the Japan Festival in Metro Detroit was held for the first time. In 1982, there were 50 Japanese companies with branches in Detroit.

By the 1980s, as the Japanese automobile industry became increasingly common in the U.S., domestic automobile companies named Japanese companies the culprit behind declining work opportunities, and as a result anti-Japanese sentiment appeared in Metro Detroit. An oil price hike of 1978 made Americans more interested in more fuel-efficient Japanese cars. John Campbell, a political science professor of the University of Michigan, stated that in the 1980s "There really was this kind of undifferentiated panic. People could say the worse [sic] things about Japan and nobody knew if it was true." For entertainment area residents destroyed Toyotas with sledgehammers. Local unions sponsored events in which Japanese automobiles were destroyed. Individuals fired bullets at drivers of Japanese cars on freeways and other individuals vandalized Japanese automobiles. There were bumper stickers that read "Honda, Toyota—Pearl Harbor". Anti-Japanese slurs appeared on Metro Detroit streetcorners, radio channels, and television channels. Helen Zia, author of Asian American Dreams: The Emergence of an American People, wrote that "Politicians and public figures made irresponsible and unambiguous racial barbs aimed at Japanese people." John Dingell, a U.S. House member from the State of Michigan, assigned blame to "those little yellow men" and Lee Iacocca, the chairperson of Chrysler, made a joke suggestion of dropping nuclear bombs on Japan.

Zia wrote that, due to the anti-Japanese sentiment, "it felt dangerous to have an Asian face." Japanese corporate employees and their families felt anxiety upon learning about the sentiment in Metro Detroit. In 1982, in Metro Detroit autoworkers killed Vincent Chin, a Chinese American mistaken as a Japanese American. An October 27, 2009 article by the Detroit Free Press stated that "It took the slaying of ... Vincent Chin by a disgruntled autoworker in 1982 to awaken Detroit of the ugliness and danger of anti-Asian racism." People within Japan perceived of Chin's killing as an example of a savagery within American culture. In the period after Chin's death, Japanese news reporters visiting Detroit told people they visited the same bar that Vincent Chin visited.

By the mid-1980s, anti-Japanese sentiment in Detroit had decreased. The level had especially decreased among young working age people. Leaders in government and business had toned down remarks regarding Japan. Japanese cars became increasingly common in Detroit, including within blue collar communities. In 1991, Sharon Cohen of the Associated Press wrote that anti-Japanese sentiment had largely decreased from 1981 and American automobile industry trade union members were working for Japanese companies. She added that "Japan-bashing" still occurred in Metro Detroit, with politicians and Iacocca making public statements against the Japanese automobile industry.

Mazda's operation at the Flat Rock Assembly Plant in Flat Rock, Michigan, was the first Japanese auto operation in the U.S. industrial heartland. In 1991 the plant had 250 Japanese employees out of its total of 3,600 employees.

In a ten-year period ending in 1992, the Japanese population in Metro Detroit had tripled. Sharon Cohen wrote in a 1991 Associated Press article that "The Japanese community [in all of Michigan] is tiny and transient: estimates range from 6,000 to 8,000." In 1990, there were 3,500 Japanese expatriates in Metro Detroit. In 1992, there were about 5,000 Japanese nationals in Metro Detroit and there were estimates of up to 270 Japanese companies there. By 1990, Chrysler was purchasing steel from Mitsui which had an office in Southfield. By 1990, since the number of Japanese companies with Detroit branches had increased to almost 300, with most of them related to the automobile industry, major accounting firms including the "Big Six" hired Japanese employees and catered to the new Japanese business populations. For the same reason, Dickinson, Wright, Moon, Van Dusen & Freeman, one of the largest law firms in Detroit, hired Japanese employees. Area hospitals began catering to Japanese patients. A hotel in Novi, the Sheraton Oaks, hired a "director of Japan marketing". By 1990, the Saturday Japanese school operated in three locations.

In the 1990s, several Japanese automobile firms had opened offices along M-14. Nissan Motor Co. opened its Farmington Hills office in November 1991. In addition, Toyota established a technical center in Ann Arbor. In 1993 the Consulate-General of Japan, Detroit, was established partly due to an increase in the numbers of Japanese businesses and residents in the states of Michigan and Ohio. In 1996, 4,084 Japanese nationals lived in Metro Detroit. By 1997, the number of Japanese nationals in Metro Detroit was 4,132. In 1999, the majority of the 8,100 Japanese in Michigan lived in a corridor in southwestern Oakland County along Interstate 696 consisting of Farmington Hills, Novi, and West Bloomfield.

The executive director of the Japan Business Society of Detroit, Tateyuki Eguchi, estimated in 2000 that the Detroit area had 5,000 "native Japanese".

=== Japanese American Citizens League Detroit Chapter ===
Founded on June 17, 1946, the Detroit chapter of the Japanese American Citizens League (JACL) began its mission to "fulfill the Japanese community's unique needs as a small, displaced group in a new community" after moving to Detroit post World War II relocation camps. Led by Peter Fujioka, the chapter's first president, the Detroit chapter collaborated with chapters nationwide to form the Midwest District Council. However, the mission of the national JACL during World War II and the mission post the war are vastly different.

The Japanese American Citizens League was founded in 1929 with a goal of improving the image of Japanese Americans following the bombing of Pearl Harbor. In the early 1940s, the JACL joined the United States government, FBI, and the Office of Naval Intelligence to identify disloyal Japanese Americans. The JACL wanted to improve the image of Nisei, second-generation Japanese Americans and reported those who resisted. With the JACL becoming such an exclusive organization, many Japanese opposed the organization completely and it received harsh criticism for its role during the war. After the war, the JACL nationwide began to support changing laws regarding citizenship, equal rights, and abolishing derogatory terms. Along with legal action, the JACL aided with gaining monetary reparations for those who experienced the camps, as well as land reparations and relocation assistance.

In the early 1950s, the chapter and the national JACL began its efforts to support the Japanese American community by campaigning Congress to pass the McCarran-Walter Omnibus Immigration and Naturalization Bill. The bill eliminated racial restrictions on immigration and naturalization, granting citizenship to immigrants and also removed the exclusion ban on Asian immigrants, providing them with a quota. With the support of the chapter, the bill was passed and allowed Issei, first-generation Japanese, to become American citizens.

Detroit also played a large role in advocating for scholarships and loans for Japanese American students. The chapter became a "beneficiary of a $10,000 Educational Loan Fund from the Detroit JACLer Taizo Kokubo". A second fund was created under the Educational Loan Fund for $20,000 to build the Japanese Room at Wayne State University in the 1980s. The fund still exists today and remains a main source of loans and scholarships for college students.

One of the main achievements of the Detroit JACL is the many events that they host, including the 18th Biennial National JACL Convention in Detroit in 1964. In addition, the chapter hosted the a convention in 1968 which conducted an oratorical contest for young adults, "What Evacuation Means to Me." With hosting events, came increased involvement with the Detroit Far Eastern festivals in the 1970s. Other events the chapter embarked upon include hosting Japanese language and cooking classes, forming an education and building committee, starting a bowling league, and creating discussions about redress, reparations given to the Japanese for relief.

In working with other ethnic groups, the chapter played "a major role in the formation and operation of these festivals for nearly ten years". These festivals included cultural festivals across the nation including the well-known Cherry Festival and other holiday festivals. Close connections formed and eventually laid the foundation for contributing to multi-ethnic associations such as the American Citizens for Justice. Later, in the 1980s, the JACL worked closely with the American Citizens for Justice during the case involving the murder of Vincent Chin.

The Detroit JACL's work continued into the 1990s when the Civil Rights Act of 1990 was passed and authorized "$20,000 redress payments to former internees of the World War II Relocation Center". Moving to Detroit was difficult, "the Japanese population arrived here in the mid-1940s with fresh memories of wartime internment in federal detention camps". Recollections of the camps were vivid, as Kaz Mayeda the head of Michigan's Japanese American Citizen's League committee of reparations recalls that "'As a 14-year-old, it was a lark for me... But the older people who were just starting to establish themselves were crushed. Their property was expropriated. They lost everything'". After coming to Detroit, James Shimoura recalls that "the FBI used to park a car outside our home every day and keep track of everyone who came in or left the house". Discrimination was clear and the JACL had a large role in creating a community and attempting to disarm that discrimination. Elaine Prout said, "I think there will always be a need for JACL because there'll always be discrimination". The chapter started a letter-writing campaign requesting support for the full and timely distribution of funds for the redress payments.

Today, the chapter continues its work by "providing a forum for educating school and church groups about the WWII internment experiences of Japanese-Americans". The JACL is continuing to make an impactful difference today and the Detroit chapter is still active. As the mission statement for the Detroit Chapter states "the JACL Detroit Chapter has been committed to aiding and celebrating the Japanese American community in Michigan since 1946" therefore making a significant impact of the lives of Japanese Americans in Detroit.

== Lifestyle ==
By 1999, many male employees of Japanese companies are sent to live in Oakland County in Metro Detroit for three- to five-year periods, taking their wives and families with them, before returning to Japan. By 1992, most women in Japanese companies did not hold job types or a high enough rank to be sent to the United States, so few professional Japanese women were sent to Metro Detroit. In 1992, most of the Japanese women residing here were homemakers who stayed at home. By this time, many of the women, despite language barriers, had formed social networks in the United States. The Japanese Society of Detroit Women's Club (JSDウィメンズクラブ JSD Wimenzukurabu) was formed in May 1991 and in March 1992 it had 230 members. Most of the members were wives of employees from companies such as Mazda, Mitsubishi, and Toyota. Most of the Japanese K-12 students in Southeast Michigan, like their parents, stay for three- to five-year periods and do not immigrate to the U.S.

In 1991, Sharon Cohen of the Associated Press wrote that many Japanese people living in Michigan "enjoy the suburban lifestyle with its open land, big houses and rolling golf courses. They live the American dream — but they don't want to become Americans." Izumi Suzuki, an operator of a translator service quoted in a 1991 Associated Press article, wrote that Japanese people returning to Japan would face difficulty if they acted too much like Americans. Mazda also suggested to Japanese employees not cluster in one community. Cohen used Mazda's suggestion as an example that Japanese were encouraged to not be "clannish".

== Commerce ==
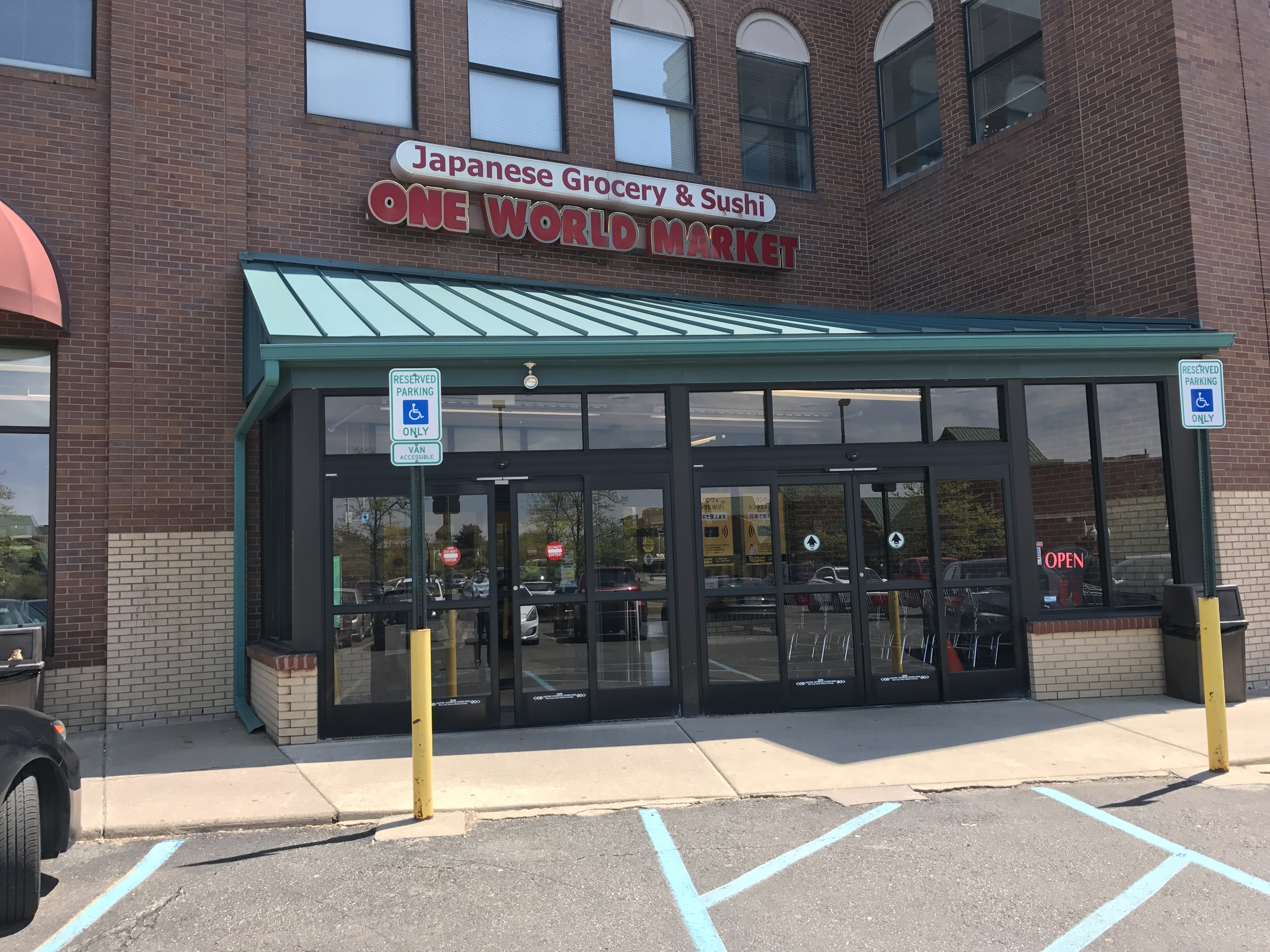
One World Market (ワンワールドマーケット), a Japanese grocery store in Novi, Michigan

Many Japanese companies operate offices in Metro Detroit. In 1999, most of the 320 companies owned or controlled by Japanese in Michigan were in Metro Detroit. The Japan Business Society of Detroit, in 2003, had 352 Japan-related businesses as members. It operates the Japan Festival, which has occurred since 1973.

In 1987 Miyuki Mascot of West Bloomfield started a Japanese language newspaper in Michigan. The Japan Detroit Press was published monthly from 1985 to 2000. It gave advice on enjoying life in Michigan. It was the only Japanese language newspaper in Michigan until the 1990s.

== Media ==
Ayako Kinoshita, the wife of a partner of Coopers & Lybrand, started a newsletter in Japanese to area expatriates giving cultural advice regarding life in the United States. Currently, the Japan News Club is the primary local Japanese-language newspaper in Michigan.

== Transportation ==
Delta Air Lines currently has nonstop flights to Haneda Airport in Tokyo (previously at Narita International Airport near Tokyo before 2020), and Chubu International Airport in Nagoya from Detroit Metropolitan Wayne County Airport. Delta inherited the Detroit hub from Northwest Airlines merger in 2008. The Detroit to Nagoya flight serves two cities with major automobile industries.

Northwest began nonstop Detroit to Narita flights on April 17, 1988, and flights to Osaka Itami International Airport began in 1993, later transferred in 1994 upon the opening of Kansai International Airport. Northwest's Detroit to Nagoya Komaki Airport flight was scheduled to begin on June 2, 1998, later transferred to the new Chubu Centrair International Airport in 2005. On February 28, 2008 Delta's flight from Detroit to Osaka Kansai International Airport was scheduled to end. Delta briefly operated a flight to Tokyo Haneda Airport from Detroit that began on February 19, 2011, but ended in March of that year. However, the flight route resumed operation on March 28, 2020; flights to Narita permanently ended on March 27, 2020.

Signage through the McNamara terminal of Detroit Airport is, along with English, in Japanese due to the large number of business travelers from Japan; Izumi Suzuki, a Sheraton employee, and several colleagues provided the Japanese translations used by the airport. In previous eras many Japanese travelers going through Detroit missed connections due to a lack of English comprehension.

== Education ==
There are no full-time nihonjin gakkō Japanese international schools in Metro Detroit, so Japanese national students attend American schools. In 2011, the Novi Community School District enrolled over 1,700 Japanese and Japanese-Americans.

Japanese School of Detroit, providing supplementary Japanese education, is located in Novi. It was founded in 1973 by the local Japanese companies. It moved to Novi from Birmingham in the northern hemisphere summer of 2011.

The Sundai Michigan International Academy, affiliated with the Sundai Center for International Education (駿台国際教育センター Sundai Kokusai Kyōiku Sentā, see 駿台予備学校), is located in Novi. The school's purpose is to prepare Japanese children who have lived in the United States for a long time for a return to Japan, and to assist newly-arrived Japanese children who have no fluency of English.

In 2010, a Japanese-English elementary school, Hinoki International School, was founded in Livonia as a public charter school growing from 13 to 135 students in 2014, when Livonia Public Schools revoked its charter. In 2014, the Niji-Iro Japanese Immersion Elementary School, a Japanese-immersion magnet elementary school of the Livonia Public Schools district, opened in Livonia with 125 students. Hinoki International School re-established itself in Farmington Hills but it closed in 2015.

== Religion ==
In the 1950s, the Trinity Methodist Church in Highland Park had a Japanese Mission.

== Notable residents ==
- Joichi "Joi" Ito
- Yuka Sato
- John Okada

== See also ==
- Demographics of Metro Detroit
- History of the Chinese Americans in Metro Detroit
