= Kang Sang-jung =

Korean Japanese academic (born 1950)

Kang Sang-jung (Korean: 강상중; Hanja: 姜尙中; born 1950), also known by his Japanese name Nagano Tetsuo (永野鉄男), is a Japanese-born South Korean political scientist, writer and public commentator. He has been an academic at several Japanese universities including the University of Tokyo (1996–2013), and President of Seigakuin University (2013–2015). He is currently Chairman of the Board of Kumamoto Prefectural Theatre.

== Biography ==
The third son of a Korean migrant from the Masan area of Korea, Kang was born and grew up in Kumamoto in Kyūshū. He has described his childhood experiences in his autobiography "Zainichi", published in 1994.

After studying at Waseda University, he was an exchange student at the University of Nurnberg, Erlangen in the then West Germany. His encounters with the families of migrant workers in Germany had a lasting influence on his understanding of Zainichi Korean identity.

After returning to Japan, he was involved in the protest movement against the compulsory fingerprinting of foreign residents in the early 1980s. He lectured at Meiji Gakuin University and International Christian University in Tokyo, before being appointed to the University of Tokyo. In 2013 he retired from the University of Tokyo to take up the position of University Professor at Seigakuin University in Saitama Prefecture, near Tokyo.

Kang's early work focused on the political and social thought of Max Weber. He has written extensively on the subject of Zainichi Korean identity, nationalism and its problems, and the relationship between Japan and North Korea. He is also an enthusiastic proponent of Northeast Asian regional integration.

Within the Japanese linguistic sphere, he is one of the most outspoken critics of Japanese Nationalism and United States Imperialism. Related to this, he has been characterized in some right-wing Japanese magazines as being a "supporter" of North Korea. Kang himself, however, vigorously contests this, pointing out that his writings have consistently criticized dictatorships, both Right-wing and Left-wing.

His other major works include "Beyond Orientalism" (Iwanami, 1996), "The Perspective of Globalization" (Iwanami, 2001, co-authored with Yoshimi Shunya), and "Nationalism" (Iwanami, 2001).

Kang is widely known as a media commentator in Japan, and has presented a number of TV documentary programs on issues including contemporary Korean society and the problems of nuclear power. His writings include the major bestsellers - "Nayamu Chikara" ("Thee Power of Disquiet", Shueisha 2008) and "Kokoro" ("Heart", Shueisha 2013). The second, a novel centred on the events of the 11 March 2011 earthquake, tsunami and nuclear accident, is a profound reflection on the human response to death, and on the search for meaning in the face of suffering and loss. His recent works include influential reassessments of the life and work of the famous novelist Natsume Sōseki: among them "Soseki no Kotoba" ("The Words of Soseki", Shueisha 2016).
