= International Charter Academy of Georgia =

Coordinates: 33°58′09″N 84°13′42″W

- Japanese: ジョージア・チャーター学院

Information
- Established: 2018; 8 years ago
- Principal: Felecia Tucker-Jones
- Enrollment: 160 (2019)
- Capacity: 300
- Language: English; Japanese

International Charter Academy of Georgia (ジョージア・チャーター学院, Jōjia Chātā Gakuin; ICAGeorgia) is a charter elementary school in Peachtree Corners, Georgia, in the Atlanta metropolitan area. The school is directly chartered by the State of Georgia.

It is a bilingual English-Japanese school, the first of such in Georgia. The school accepts students who reside in Georgia.

In 2019 the principal was Tara Ranzy.

== History ==
It was established in fall 2018. It opened after an area private Christian English-Japanese bilingual school, Seigakuin Atlanta International School, closed.

In 2019 it had 160 students, and it aimed to get up to 300.

== Operations ==
Most of the money that the school has comes from the state government, and the U.S. federal government gives additional funds. It does not receive any money from the county government because it is a charter school.

== Student body ==
Students include those who are native English speakers, native Japanese speakers, and some native speakers of other languages.

== Curriculum ==
The school has a larger amount of content taught in Japanese in lower grades while English is used more heavily later. As of 2021 the balance at the Kindergarten level is 20% of the content in English. For grades 1-2 and then 3, the percentage of English content increases to 40%, and then 50%, respectively. English and Japanese medium instruction is used in each major subject. Teachers who teach Japanese medium content work with those who teach English medium content. The school also had plans to have 45-minute courses about Chinese with two or three occurrences per school week per student.

== See also ==
- Consulate-General of Japan, Atlanta
- Hinoki International School - Japanese-English bilingual charter school in Metro Detroit
- Japanese language education in the United States
