= Henry Ford Providence Novi Hospital =

Hospital in Michigan, United States

Coordinates: 42.4872°N 83.5199°W

- Henry Ford Health

Geography
- Location: Novi, Michigan, United States

Organization
- Type: General
- Religious affiliation: Catholic

Services
- Emergency department: Level II trauma center
- Beds: 277

Helipads
- Helipad: (FAA LID: 63MI)

History
- Opened: September 5, 2008

Links
- Website: henryford.com/locations/providence-novi-hospital
- Lists: Hospitals in Michigan

The Henry Ford Providence Novi Hospital, is a hospital in Novi, Michigan in Greater Detroit. It is a Comprehensive Stroke Center and part of Henry Ford Health.

== History ==
Groundbreaking began in October 2005. It was the first hospital in Southeast Michigan to open in 20 years. The hospital was established due to population growth in western Oakland County. A previous branch campus of the main Providence Hospital in Southfield, Michigan, with 300,000 square feet (28,000 m^{2}) of space was to be expanded to 700,000 square feet (65,000 m^{2}).

The architect was NBBJ's Columbus, Ohio office and the general contractor was Barton Malow of Southfield. The hospital opening was scheduled for August 8, 2008. Due to an installation of information technology systems for the electronic medical record system, the opening was moved to September 5. The hospital was scheduled to open with 400 employees, with a planned expansion to 1,200 with the final 100 being available by February 2009.

The hospital building, with a cost of $229 million, was scheduled to be installed with 200 inpatient beds and it had capacity for an additional 68 beds. The medical office building was originally going to have 80,000 square feet (7,400 m^{2}) of space. Peter McCann, a doctor of Eye Care Associated, stated that the building was expanded larger than initially planned due to a high demand for the services provided. Providence Park Physicians LLC invested $39 million into the medical office building. As of August 2008, only one space in the building, with 2,400 square feet (220 m^{2}) of space, was not occupied. The total cost of the entire St. John Providence project was over $300 million.

In 2009, Art Van Elslander, who had supported the St. John Health System, made an unspecified donation to the health system; the system stated it was the largest donation it ever received. The system announced that the funds were to be used to expand Providence Park Hospital's neurosciences center and to buy capital equipment worth several million dollars.

In 2018 the system was renamed Ascension Michigan as it had been acquired by Ascension Health. Accordingly, the names of the hospitals, including the Novi one, changed. In 2023 Ascension negotiated an agreement with Henry Ford Health System which lead to this hospital becoming Henry Ford Providence Hospital Novi in 2024.

== Facility ==
The hospital campus is located near the intersection of Interstate 96 and Beck Road. The campus includes a 500,000-square-foot (46,000 m^{2}) hospital building, a 210,000-square-foot (20,000 m^{2}) medical office building, and the 60,000-square-foot (5,600 m^{2}) Orthopedic and Ambulatory Surgical Center. The medical office building is on 24 acres (9.7 ha) of land leased by the hospital. The surgical center is on 7 acres (2.8 ha) of land and is leased by Novi Orthopaedic Center Properties LLC.

The seven-story hospital building has 500,000 square feet (46,000 m^{2}) of space. The hospital building includes hidden elevators, hallways, pathways, and tunnels so the public does not see carts and patients in transport. As of 2008, all of the 200 inpatient beds were private and 168 of them were ICU-ready. According to Rob Casalou, the hospital CEO, he took a one-week visit to the Disney Institute of Florida and came up with the ideas of the hidden elevators and hallways. The hospital design includes a six-story atrium that allows natural sunlight.

The development also includes a 108-room hotel, Staybridge Suites Detroit - Novi, located on the other side of Grand River Avenue from the medical office building. The hotel was built for $10 million. The groundbreaking occurred in late October 2006, and the hotel opened in February 2008.

== Services ==
Due to the number of Japanese residents in the area, the hospital offers cultural awareness training for employees, documents translated in Japanese, Japanese translators, and yoga classes conducted in Japanese. In addition the hospital website has Japanese welcome messages. The hospital provides required physicals for Japanese executives when they first arrive in the United States to report to work. The hospital established an official Japanese Health Care program in 2009, bringing together practices that had developed from having Japanese families in the institution's care.
