= Seigakuin Atlanta International School =

- 聖学院アトランタ国際学校

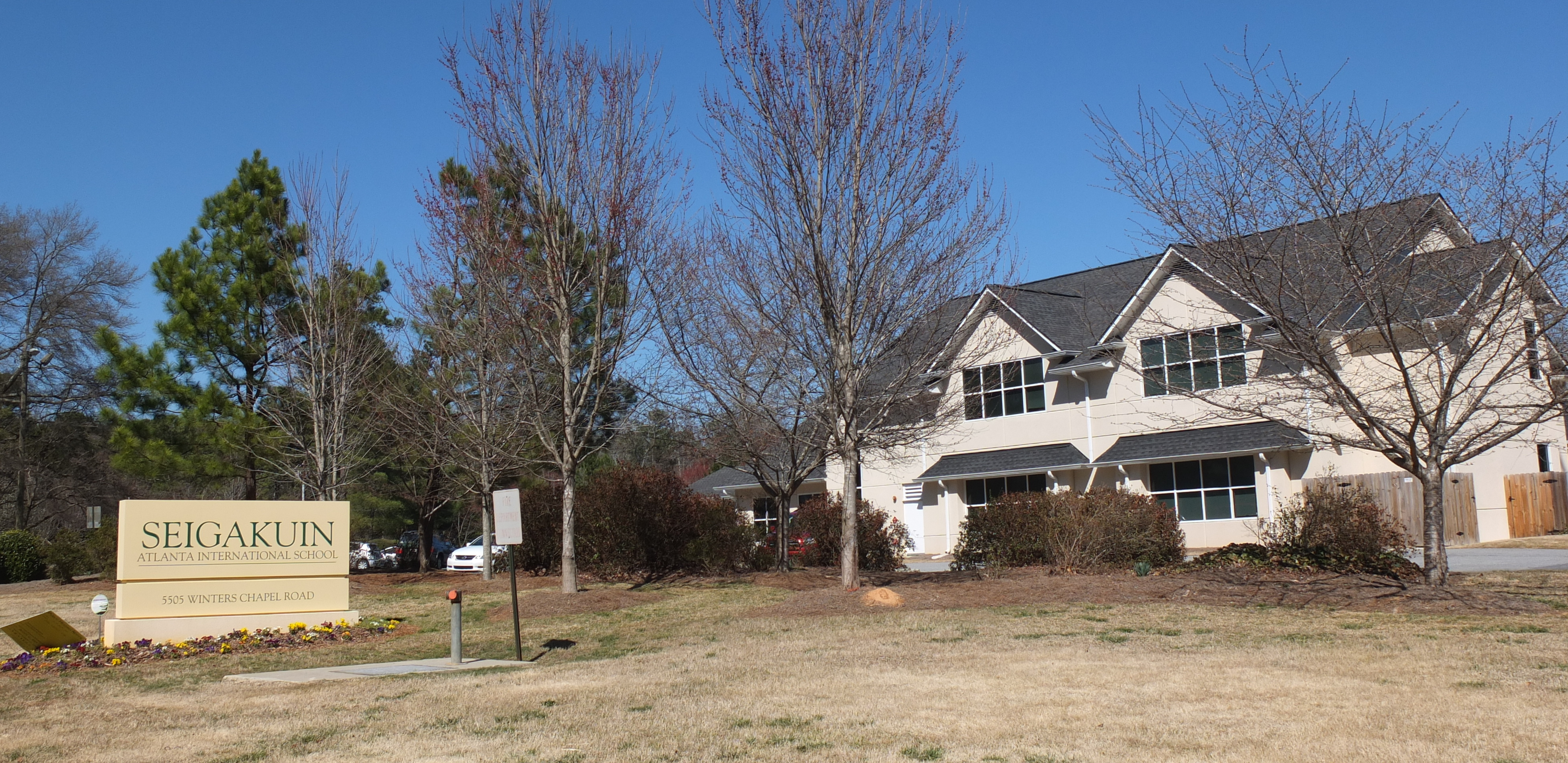
- Seigakuin Atlanta International School (March 23, 2014)

Location
- 5505 Winters Chapel Road, Atlanta, GA 30360 USA; Peachtree Corners, Georgia; United States; 33°57′27.9″N 84°16′19.8″W

Information
- Type: Elementary school previously had junior high school
- Website: seig.ac.jp/english/atlanta/index.htm

Seigakuin Atlanta International School (聖学院アトランタ国際学校, Seigakuin Atoranta Kokusai Gakkō; SAINTS) was an international, private, Christian elementary school located in Peachtree Corners, Georgia, United States, northeast of Atlanta, It is an affiliate to Seigakuin University, and therefore is a Shiritsu zaigai kyōiku shisetsu (私立在外教育施設) or an overseas branch of a Japanese private school. It was the only school in Greater Atlanta to have its curriculum accredited by the Japanese Ministry of Education. From its founding in 1990 until 2003, the school had been located on the property of Oglethorpe University in Brookhaven, DeKalb County. In 2003, the school moved to its final location. From April 2008 until the school's 2018 closure, Minako Oki Ahearn (エイハーンみな子, Eihān Minako) served as the principal.

== History ==
The organization Seigakuin Atlanta International School, lnc. was founded in March 1990, and classes for the SAINTS school began on September 5, 1990. The school was originally located on the property of Oglethorpe University in Brookhaven (previously the North Atlanta census-designated place) in then-unincorporated DeKalb County, in a former public elementary school building. This facility is now occupied by PATH Academy, a charter school.

The SAINTS junior high school opened in 1993. In 1994 the Japanese Ministry of Education approved SAINTS as an overseas educational facility. In the spring of 1995 the school planned to add the ninth grade, the final educational year. The school had no plans to add a high school. The school's first group of ninth graders were scheduled to graduate in 1996. Sherrell Evans of the Atlanta Journal-Constitution said that many would go on to area public and private high schools, or attend private Japanese boarding schools in New York and Tennessee (Keio Academy of New York and Tennessee Meiji Gakuin High School). In 1998 the school experienced a decline in enrollment, and therefore stopped admitting junior high school students.

As of 2002 the school had class sizes of seven or eight students per grade. That year, the school announced plans to move to a property in Gwinnett County formerly owned by the First Romanian Baptist Church, in proximity to Doraville. The campus had a capacity of up to 110 students. Minako Ahearn, the executive board director and business manager, said that the school was more centrally located for its students. The school purchased the campus in March 2003, and the new school opened in April of that year. A new classroom building at the Gwinnett facility opened in 2007.

In 2016 Ahearn sought to have a new charter school established, citing rising private school costs. International Charter Academy of Georgia, which opened in 2018, has Ahearn as a board member.

In 2017 the school's board of directors announced the school will close in 2018 since Seigakuin University no longer has the funds to support the school.

== Operations ==
As of 2014, the school operated a pre-school for children ages 3–4, a kindergarten, and an elementary school that ran through the 6th grade.

The school accepted qualified applicants of all national origins, religions, and racial backgrounds. Around 1994 the school implemented a policy that prevented prospective applicants who are not entering at the kindergarten level from enrolling if they do not know Japanese. During that year, Nobuaki Oda, the headmaster, said that the policy was implemented because it was too difficult for the school to teach academic subjects in a language that some students could not understand.

As of 1994, the annual tuition ranged from $3,100 ($6733.83 according to inflation) to $5,320 ($11556.13). The lowest cost was for kindergarten students and the highest cost was for junior high school students. As of 2002 the annual tuition costs ranged from $5,000 ($8950.05) to $7,000 ($12530.06). As of 2014 the annual tuition costs ranged from $7,000 to $9,000, though the school did offer scholarships.

As of 1990, if a student left Seigakuin Atlanta in good standing, he or she had the option of automatically enrolling in the Seigakuin University network of schools in Japan.

Due to the declining birthrate in Japan and the declining enrollment in private schools, Japan Seigakuin was no longer able to financially support Seigakuin Atlanta International School. For this reason, the board made the decision to close SAINTS at the end of the first term in 2018.

== Curriculum ==
The school used the curriculum of the Japanese Ministry of Education. As of 1990, all classes except English language classes are taught in Japanese. The textbooks originated in Japan. Unlike in Japanese schools, students at Seigakuin Atlanta studied U.S. history. In addition, they began studying English in kindergarten; in 1990 this was seven years earlier than when Japanese students had to begin studying English. From elementary school, students studied all of the core subjects in Japanese, using the same textbooks as their peers in Japan. As students got older, English-language instruction in these core subjects was added to the curriculum, such that students might study math in Japanese on Monday, then continue with math in English on Tuesday. Consequently, students are exposed to both American and Japanese history and literature. By the time they reached 6th grade, about half of their instruction time was in English, and half in Japanese. The curriculum was adjusted in 2004 as more students originated from non-Japanese backgrounds.

Sherryl Lane, an English-language instructor quoted in Transpacific, stated in 1994 that "Our students are from families interested in their children being fluent in Japanese and English" and that many parents select the school because of its English language program.

The curriculum also had a Christian component. In 1994, in Kindergarten students listened to Bible stories and prayed, and by the seventh grade, Seigakuin Atlanta students regularly took Bible classes. Kindergartners learned Bible verses in both languages, while elementary students attended a twenty-minute worship service each morning. The school also put on a Christmas pageant each year.

== Student body ==
As of October 2014, the school had 92 students. 52 percent were are native Japanese speakers, 14 percent were native English speakers, and the remaining 34 percent came from bilingual households. In 2016 the school had about 100 students, with about 50% natively speaking Japanese and the remainder from other backgrounds.

When the school was first founded in September 1990, it had 23 students, including 16 kindergarten students and 7 students in grades 1 through 4. In December 1990 the enrollment increased to 30 students. Around 1990, when the school was first established, most of the students were born in Japan. The parents typically resided in the United States for three to four year periods before taking themselves and their families back to Japan. Most of the parents worked for Japanese companies, and they wanted their children to easily adjust to the Japanese educational system upon their return to Japan.

In 1992 the school had 62 students, 75% of whom were Japanese nationals who were scheduled to eventually come back to Japan. In 1994 the school had 75 students in preschool through 8th grade. In 1994, the number of children who were not fully Japanese was increasing. As of that year, 20% of the students were Americans with no Japanese background and Americans who each had one parent of Japanese descent. Many parents enrolled the students in the school because they were interested in the Japanese educational style, which has a high international reputation, and/or because they wanted their children to learn about Japanese culture.

== See also ==
- Consulate-General of Japan, Atlanta
- Japanese language education in the United States
- American School in Japan, American international school in Tokyo
