= Katate Masatsuka =

Japanese part-time author (born 1971)

- Born: September 1971 (age 54–55); Sakai, Osaka, Japan
- Education: University of Michigan

Katate Masatsuka (方手 雅塚; born September 1971) is a Japanese part-time author. He is an author of unique three-volume high-school Math textbooks (in Japanese) titled Seishun High-School Mathematics and a technical book on Computational fluid dynamics (CFD) titled I do like CFD, VOL.1. He is also a singer and songwriter with over 100 songs written so far (2003–2009). Other creations such as Kanji-humanoids can be found at his official website. He also runs a Japanese school at his home to establish a new style oversea Japanese education.

He was born in Sakai, Osaka, Japan, in 1971. He graduated from Tokai University in 1994 and entered the graduate school of the University of Tokyo. He then moved to the University of Michigan to study Computational Fluid Dynamics. During his graduate study in Michigan, he also worked at Koby International Academy in Novi as a part-time instructor in Math and Science. He obtained his Ph.D. in 2001 and stayed in Michigan as a post-doctoral researcher until 2007 when he moved to Virginia. Based on his 10 years of experience in teaching high-school Math, he wrote three-volume Math textbooks. Also, he wrote a book on Computational fluid dynamics, I do like CFD, VOL.1, in which he explains fundamental concepts and formulas in CFD by explaining how he likes them. The second edition of I do like CFD, VOL.1 was released on October 1, 2013, in both hard copy and PDF versions. The PDF version is sponsored by Software Cradle and it is available for free. The second volume of the series has not yet been completed. His interest lies exclusively in creating something new and unique. He has also published a lot of articles in computational physics.

== Education ==
- Ph.D. in Aerospace Engineering and Scientific Computing, 2001 University of Michigan
- M.S., in Applied Mathematics, 1999 University of Michigan
- M.S.E. in Aerospace Engineering, 1996 University of Michigan
- B.E. in Aerospace Engineering, 1994 Tokai University
