= The Paramount at Buckhead =

- Interactive map of the The Paramount at Buckhead area

General information
- Type: Condo
- Location: 3445 Stratford Rd NE; Atlanta, Georgia 30326; United States
- Coordinates: 33°51′04″N 84°22′03″W
- Construction started: 2002
- Completed: 2004
- Management: FirstService Residential

Height
- Roof: 478 ft (146 m)

Technical details
- Floor count: 40 above ground / 5 below ground
- Lifts/elevators: 4

Design and construction
- Developer: The Hanover Company

The Paramount at Buckhead is a 478 ft (146 m) tall residential skyscraper in Atlanta, Georgia, and the tallest building in The Alliance Center complex. It was constructed between 2002 and 2004, and has 40 floors above ground and 5 floors below ground. It is the 21st tallest building in Atlanta. The Paramount at Buckhead is the tallest residential structure ever built using tunnelform concrete construction.
