= Consulate-General of Japan, Detroit =

Diplomatic mission of Japan

Consulate-General of Japan, Detroit 在デトロイト日本国総領事館
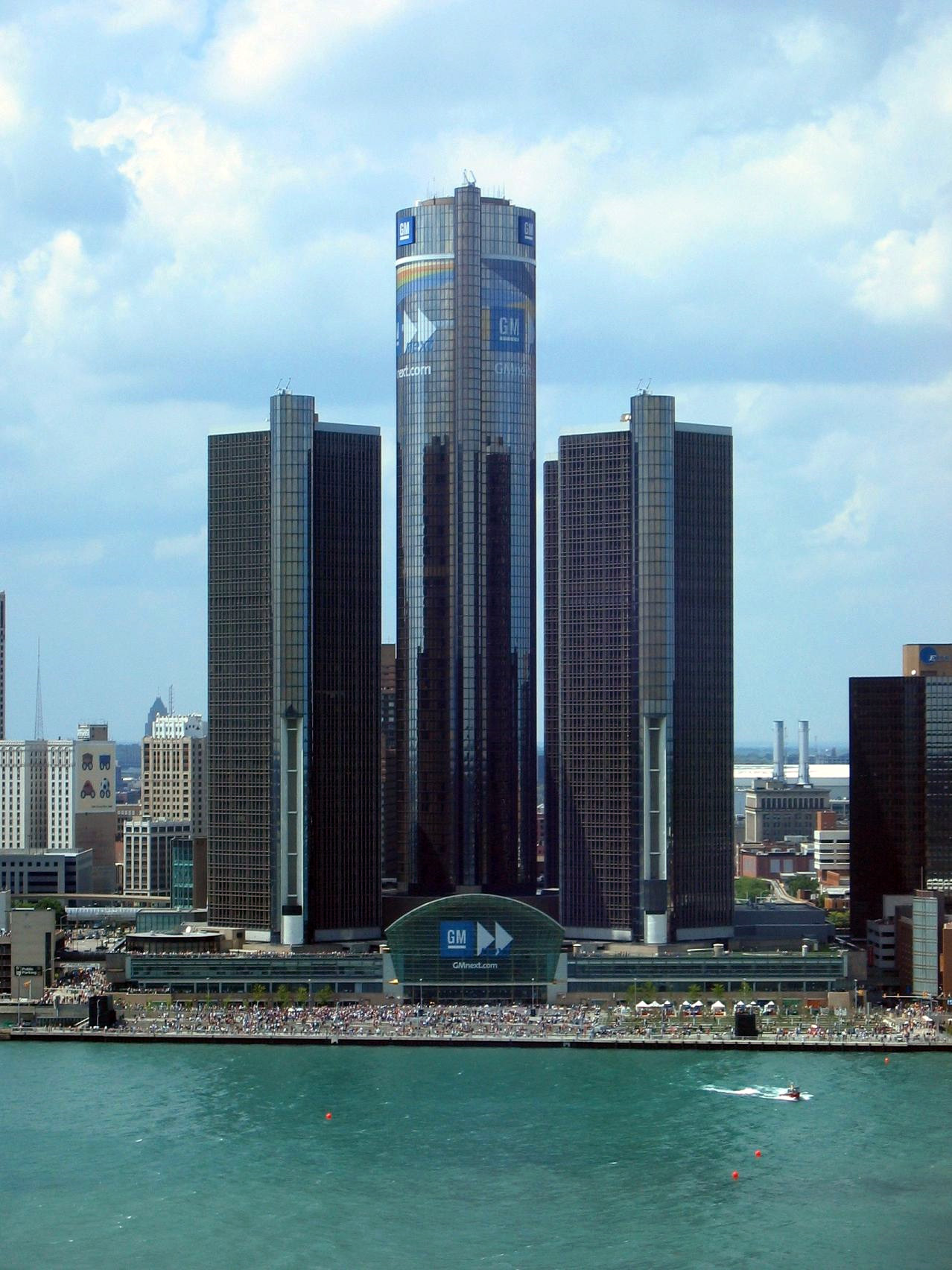
- The GM Renaissance Center houses the consulate.
- Location: Detroit, Michigan, United States

The Consulate-General of Japan, Detroit (在デトロイト日本国総領事館, Zai Detoroito Nippon-koku Sōryōjikan) is a diplomatic mission of Japan. It is located in Suite 1600 Tower 400 of the GM Renaissance Center in Downtown Detroit, Michigan. Its jurisdiction includes the states of Michigan and Ohio.

The Japanese government proposed opening the consulate in order to improve Japan's image with the United States and decrease tensions between the Japanese government and automotive companies. It was also established due to an increase in the numbers of Japanese businesses and residents in the states of Michigan and Ohio. Officials from the American and Japanese governments hoped that the consulate opening would ease trade-related tensions.

The consulate exists to promote business and cultural connections between Japan and the United States, and to serve Japanese residents in the states of Michigan and Ohio. As of 2022, there are approximately 25,000 Japanese nationals residing in the consulate's jurisdiction.

== History ==
It was scheduled to open on January 11, 1993 in an unspecified hotel facility, which was in Downtown Detroit. Japanese officials were looking for a permanent office space for the consulate. Yasukuni Enoki (榎 泰邦 Enoki Yasukuni) was the first consul general there.

In 1993 the Japan Digest reported that the Japanese government had plans to station an official who would facilitate exports of American made cars to Japan and inspect and drive the models. This would ensure that the safety and emission testing under Japanese law is done more quickly. The U.S. automotive industry had complained of delays in this procedure.

After the 2011 Tōhoku earthquake and tsunami occurred, the consulate received over 200 donations with a total of over $268,000. The consul general, Kuninori Matsuda (松田 邦紀 Matsuda Kuninori), offered his thanks to the people of Michigan and Ohio.

== See also ==
Metro Detroit Japanese community

- History of the Japanese in Metro Detroit
- Japanese School of Detroit
- Novi, Michigan
- Niji-Iro Japanese Immersion Elementary School
- Hinoki International School
- Sundai Michigan International Academy

Diplomatic missions

- Consulate-General of Japan, Atlanta
- Consulate-General of Japan, Honolulu
- Consulate-General of Japan, Houston
- Consulate-General of Japan, Nashville
- Diplomatic missions of Japan
