= Consulate General of Japan, Atlanta =

Japanese diplomatic mission in Atlanta, Georgia

Consulate-General of Japan, Atlanta 在アトランタ日本国総領事館
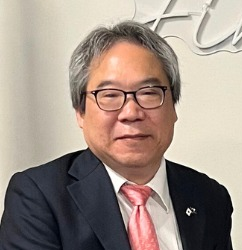
- Current Consulate General Mio Maeda in 2025 The Japanese Consulate-General in Atlanta represents Japanese interests in Georgia, Alabama, North Carolina, and South Carolina
- Location: Atlanta, Georgia, United States
- Address: 3438 Peachtree Road Northeast
- Consul General: Mio Maeda

The Consulate-General of Japan, Atlanta (在アトランタ日本国総領事館, Zai Atoranta Nippon-koku Sōryōjikan) is a diplomatic mission of Japan. It is located in the Buckhead area of Atlanta. The consulate's jurisdiction includes Georgia, Alabama, North Carolina, and South Carolina.

== History ==
The consulate was established on February 15, 1974. At the time, 20 Japanese companies had operations in the Southeastern United States. In 1995 Yuji Miyamoto, the consul general, said that economic relations between Japan and Georgia and other economic states and "grassroots relationships" between those areas were increasing. That year, 200 unionists from several states in the Southern United States protested at Colony Square, the location of the consulate at the time, in Midtown Atlanta. They went to deliver a letter of appeal to the consulate regarding the replacement of over 2,000 Bridgestone/Firestone workers who were striking. Security officers from the complex intervened.

In 2002, the consulate announced it was moving from Colony Square to One Alliance Center. It had signed a ten-year lease there for fewer than 26,000 square feet (2,400 m^{2}) of space. The consulate had over three years left in the lease of Colony Square. Because Trizec Properties owned both office properties, the consulate was easily able to move to its new location. In 2005, there were almost 700 Japanese companies with operations in the Southeastern United States, employing over 89,500 people. The cumulative Japanese investment was over $20 billion that year. In 2005 almost 20,000 Japanese nationals resided in that region, including 6,600 in the State of Georgia.

== Facility ==
It is located in Suite 850 of the Phipps Tower in the Buckhead area of Atlanta. Previously (as of 2005) the consulate was in Suite 1600 on the 16th floor of the One Alliance Center in Buckhead, and the consul general's office had a northward panoramic view of the Kennesaw Mountain. In 2005 the consul general's mansion was also in Buckhead. In a prior period (as of 1995) the consulate was in Colony Square in Midtown Atlanta.

== See also ==
- International Charter Academy of Georgia
- Seigakuin Atlanta International School
- Consulate-General of Japan, Detroit
- Consulate-General of Japan, Honolulu
- Consulate-General of Japan, Houston
- Consulate-General of Japan, Nashville
- Diplomatic missions of Japan
