= Alliance Center =

Building complex in Atlanta, Georgia, USA

Coordinates: 33.851717°N 84.365853°W

The Alliance Center is a complex in Atlanta, Georgia. Its tallest building is the 478-foot, 40-floor Paramount at Buckhead. It also includes the 22-floor One Alliance Center, and the 30-floor Two Alliance Center.

Previously the Consulate-General of Japan in Atlanta was in Suite 1600 on the 16th floor of One Alliance Center, and the consul general's office had a northward panoramic view of Kennesaw Mountain. In 2005 the consul general's mansion was also in Buckhead. In 2002 the consulate announced it was moving from Colony Square to One Alliance Center. It had signed a ten-year lease there for fewer than 26,000 square feet (2,400 m^{2}) of space. The consulate had over three years left on the lease of Colony Square. Because Trizec Properties owned both office properties, the consulate was easily able to move to its new location.

Global Payments is headquartered in Three Alliance Center.

== See also ==
- List of tallest buildings in Atlanta
