= Sundai Michigan International Academy =

School in Michigan, United States

Coordinates: 42°28′04.5″N 83°28′30.7″W

- Japanese: 駿台ミシガン国際学院
- Sundai Group logo, also used by the Michigan academy

Location
- 24277 Novi Road; Novi, Michigan, 48375; United States

Information
- Former name: Koby International Academy (Japanese: コービィ国際学院)
- Established: 1993; 33 years ago
- Founder: Yoshihisa Kobayashi
- Website: sites.google.com/view/sunmichi/Home

Sundai Michigan International Academy (駿台ミシガン国際学院 Sundai Mishigan Kokusai Gakuin), affiliated with the Sundai Center for International Education (駿台国際教育センター Sundai Kokusai Kyōiku Sentā, see 駿台予備学校), is located in Novi, Michigan, in Metro Detroit. The school's purpose is to prepare Japanese children who have lived in the United States for a long time for a return to Japan, and to assist newly arrived Japanese children who have no fluency of English. As of 2008 it was the only Japanese-style year-round school within the State of Michigan; in addition to a day school program, the school has after-school and weekend classes.

== History ==
Previously known as the Koby International Academy (コービィ国際学院 Kōbii Kokusai Gakuin), the school was founded in September 1993, by Yoshihisa Kobayashi, who, as of 2008, is the president of the school. Kobayashi moved to the U.S. in 1987 after working as an English teacher in his native Japan. Prior to opening Koby, Kobayashi attended Master of Business Administration (MBA) courses at the University of Detroit Mercy and worked in the automobile sector.

The school began with after school enrichment and Saturday supplemental divisions. In 1999 the day school opened, and the school was registered with the Michigan Department of Education in 2000. In 2008 it had a yearly tuition of $10,000 and a 60 student waiting list. As of 2008 it is not accredited. The school does not take public funds, so it is not required to offer standardized tests such as the Michigan Educational Assessment Program (MEAP).

== Campus ==
The school formerly had its main campus in the Peach Tree Plaza shopping center in Novi and the West Maple Center (West Maple校 -Kō) in West Bloomfield Township. As of 2008 the school had plans to occupy empty storefronts and expand within the Peach Tree shopping center.

== Curriculum ==
The school offers calligraphy, English, handicrafts, mathematics, and science courses. As of 2008 the school's teachers give more individualized attention due to the class sizes, as there were 12 students per class.

== Student body ==
As of 2008 most of the school's students are those who will shortly return to Japan; about 95% of the students were scheduled to leave the United States and return to Japan within a three-year period. The students live in various parts of Southeast Michigan, including Ann Arbor and Canton. As of 2008, 60 students were on the school's waiting list. Velvet S. McNeil of The Detroit News wrote "Students who don't speak fluent English often find the school comforting."

== Notable employees ==
- Katate Masatsuka

== See also ==
- Japanese language education in the United States

Sundai educational system

- Sundai Preparatory School
- Sundai Ireland International School

Japanese community of Detroit

- History of the Japanese in Metro Detroit
- Japanese School of Detroit
- Hinoki International School
- Niji-Iro Japanese Immersion Elementary School
- Consulate-General of Japan, Detroit

American schools in Japan

- American School in Japan, American international school in Tokyo

== Notes ==
- Content originated from History of the Japanese in Metro Detroit
