= Colony Square =

Mixed-use development and sub-district in Midtown Atlanta, Georgia

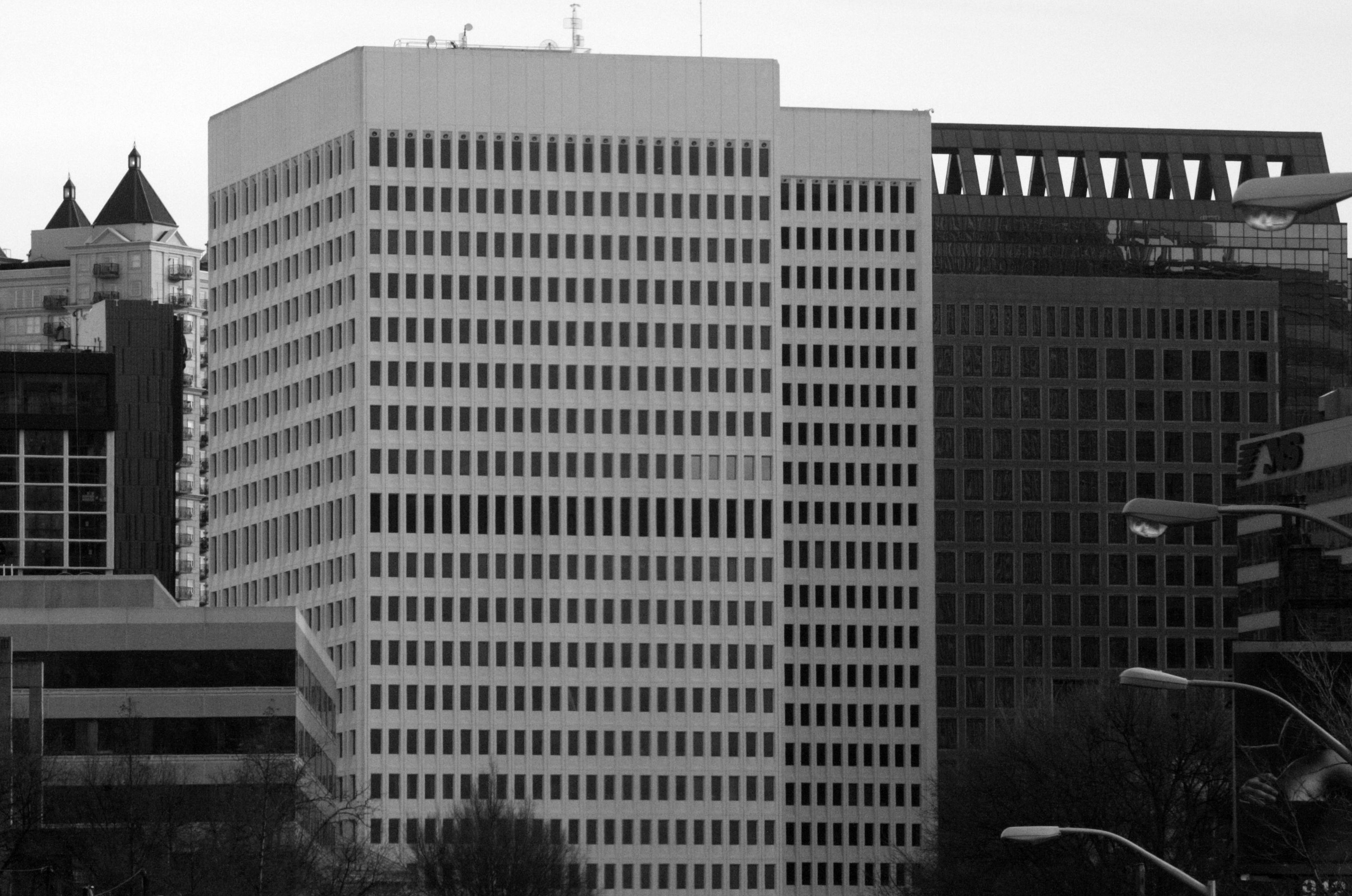
- Colony Square's concrete towers, designed in a New Formalist and Brutalist architectural style
- Interactive map of the Colony Square area

General information
- Status: Completed
- Type: Mixed-use development and sub-district
- Architectural style: New Formalist and Brutalist
- Location: Midtown Atlanta, Atlanta, Georgia
- Coordinates: 33.787148°N 84.383161°W
- Completed: 1975
- Opening: 1969
- Owner: Jamestown

Design and construction
- Architect: Henri Jova of Jova/Daniels/Busby

Colony Square is a mixed-use development and sub-district in Midtown Atlanta, Georgia, located on Peachtree Street between 14th and 15th Streets. Built between 1969 and 1975, it is the oldest high-rise development in Midtown and the first mixed-use development in the Southeastern United States. Henri Jova of Jova/Daniels/Busby served as principal architect.

The complex was designed in a style blending New Formalism and Brutalism, apparent in its precast and reinforced concrete frames and board-form concrete surfaces. Colony Square comprises three skyscrapers: two containing offices (100 Colony Square and 400 Colony Square) and one housing a hotel, The Starling Atlanta Midtown, connected by an open-air public plaza. Also within the sub-district are three mid-rise condominium buildings: two comprising Colony House and a third, Hanover House. The complex underwent a major redevelopment completed in 2021, adding new office towers and the Politan Row food hall. In August 2024, real estate firm Jamestown acquired Colony Square from North American Properties.

== History ==
=== Original development (1969–1975) ===
Colony Square was conceived by developer Jim Cushman as an urban mixed-use "micropolis" — a self-sufficient colony intended for professionals to live and work in a shared environment. Construction began in 1969, with the project completed in 1975 under the design of Henri Jova of the Atlanta firm Jova/Daniels/Busby. The complex originally included an enclosed mall, two office towers, a hotel, and condominium buildings.

=== Redevelopment (2015–2021) ===
In late 2015, North American Properties agreed to purchase Colony Square from Tishman Speyer for $164.5 million; the deal covered the retail and office components but excluded the condominiums and hotel. North American Properties subsequently demolished the former enclosed mall to create an open-air public plaza with a stage, and constructed two new office buildings: 300 Colony Square, anchored by the Whole Foods Market South regional office, and 500 Colony Square, anchored by Jones Day.

The $400 million redevelopment project was officially completed in July 2021, with Colony Square featuring 912,000 square feet of office space and 160,000 square feet of retail and entertainment space, including the Politan Row food hall and an iPic movie theater. The iPic theater closed in April 2026 after the parent company filed for Chapter 11 bankruptcy protection.

In June 2022, the onsite hotel was renovated and rebranded as The Starling Atlanta Midtown, joining Hilton's Curio Collection. In August 2024, Jamestown acquired Colony Square as part of a larger portfolio purchase.

== Component buildings ==
- 100 Colony Square, 1175 Peachtree Street NE: 24 floors, opened 1970.
- 300 Colony Square, 1197 Peachtree Street NE: Mixed-use, opened 2020, anchored by the Whole Foods Market South regional office.
- 400 Colony Square, 1201 Peachtree Street NE: 22 floors, opened 1975.
- 500 Colony Square, 1200 Peachtree Street NE: Opened 2020, anchored by Jones Day.
- The Starling Atlanta Midtown, 188 14th Street NE: 28 floors, opened 1974 (formerly the W Atlanta–Midtown); rebranded 2022.
- Colony House, 145 15th Street NE: Residential condominium, 14 floors.
- Hanover House, 147 15th Street NE: Residential condominium.

== Tenants ==
=== Current ===
The Consulate-General of Canada is located in Suite 1700 of 100 Colony Square. The Netherlands Foreign Investment Agency occupies Suite 1206 of the same building. The broadcast studios of Audacy, Inc. (formerly Entercom) — including radio stations WVEE, WZGC, WAOK, and WSTR — are located in 400 Colony Square. WeWork operates a coworking location at 100 Colony Square.

=== Former ===
The Consulate-General of Japan in Atlanta was located in Colony Square until 2002, when it relocated to One Alliance Center. Because Trizec Properties owned both buildings at the time, the transition was facilitated without breaking the remaining lease.

== See also ==
- Midtown Atlanta
- Henri Jova
