= Henry Ford Health =

Health care organization in Michigan, US

- Formerly: Henry Ford Health System (until 2022)
- Type: Non-profit
- Industry: Healthcare
- Founded: 1915
- Founder: Henry Ford
- Headquarters: Detroit, Michigan, U.S.
- Area served: Metro Detroit; Greater Flint; Jackson
- Key people: Robert G. Riney, CEO
- Revenue: ▲$6.8 billion USD (2021)
- Net income: ▼$234 million USD (2022)
- Total assets: 1,874,131,097 United States dollar (2011)
- Owner: Ascension (20%)
- Number of employees: 33,000+ (2023); ~6,000 physicians and researches (2023)

Henry Ford Health is an integrated, not-for-profit health care organization in the U.S. state of Michigan. Headquartered in Detroit, Henry Ford Health is the second-largest health system in Michigan, operating 13 hospitals across the Detroit, Flint, and Jackson areas. Henry Ford established the health system in 1915, and it is currently run by a 15-member board of directors. Henry Ford Health also owns the health insurance company Health Alliance Plan.

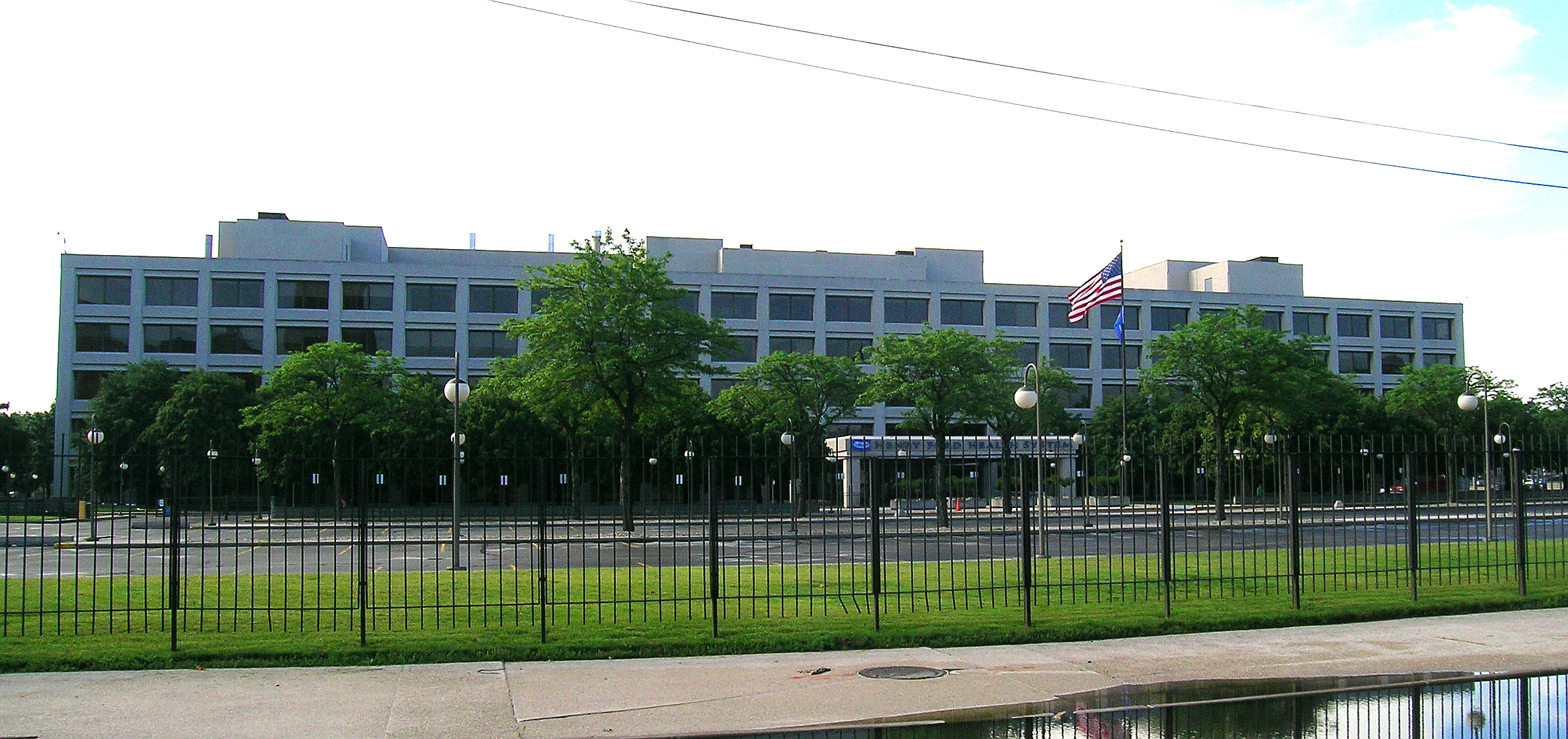
The headquarters of Henry Ford Health in June 2008

== History ==
In March 2012, Henry Ford Health System closed its hospital in Warren, Michigan.

Henry Ford Health System announced in March 2022 that they would rebrand as Henry Ford Health, dropping the word "system" from their name to put greater emphasis on the word "health."

=== Ascension joint venture ===
On October 18, 2023, Henry Ford Health announced plans to create a joint venture with Ascension, assuming the Metro Detroit and Flint operations of Ascension Michigan. Under this arrangement, Ascension controls a 20% ownership and voting stake in the combined organization. The joint venture was finalized on September 30, 2024.

Under the arrangement, hospitals formerly owned by Ascension will continue to be designated as Catholic institutions, and continue to follow Catholic healthcare guidelines, and as such will not offer abortion, birth control, tubal ligation, or gender-affirming care services. Facilities owned by Henry Ford prior to the joint venture will remain secular and continue to offer these services.

On September 9, 2025, during a United States Senate hearing, a 2020 Henry Ford Health draft was misrepresented and distorted to claim that vaccination raises the risk of chronic illness. The conclusions of the draft were quickly abandoned after the first internal review revealed that it contained several serious methodological flaws.

Logo used until 2022

== Hospitals ==
The Henry Ford Health provides acute, specialty, primary and preventive care services backed by research and education. Henry Ford Health directly operates ten emergency departments. All of the hospitals (except for Kingswood) operate an emergency room along with Henry Ford Health medical centers in Dearborn (Fairlane), Grosse Pointe Farms (Grosse Pointe), Plymouth, and Sterling Heights. There is also a Henry Ford Health Center in Brownstown Charter Township (Brownstown).

Henry Ford's regional hospital and services include the following hospitals:

| Hospital | Location | Bed count | Trauma center | Opened | Notes |
|---|---|---|---|---|---|
| Henry Ford Hospital | Detroit | 877 | Level I | 1915 | |
| Henry Ford St. John Hospital | Detroit | 619 | Level I | | formerly Ascension St. John Hospital |
| Henry Ford Jackson Hospital | Jackson | 475 | Level II | 1918 | originally Foote Hospital, later Allegiance Health; acquired 2016 |
| Henry Ford Wyandotte Hospital | Wyandotte | 401 | Level III | 1926 | |
| Henry Ford Macomb Hospital | Clinton Township | 361 | Level II | 1899 | formerly St. Joseph's Mercy; acquired 2007 |
| Henry Ford Genesys Hospital | Grand Blanc Township | 353 | Level II | | formerly Genesys Hospital; acquired by Ascension in 2016 |
| Henry Ford Warren Hospital | Warren | 348 | Level III | | formerly Ascension Macomb-Oakland Hospital Warren Campus |
| Henry Ford Providence Southfield Hospital | Southfield | 321 | Level II | | formerly Ascension Providence Hospital Southfield Campus |
| Henry Ford Providence Novi Hospital | Novi | 200 | Level II | 2008 | formerly Ascension Providence Hospital Novi Campus |
| Henry Ford Rochester Hospital | Rochester Hills | 197 | Level III | | originally Crittenton Hospital; later Ascension Providence Hospital Rochester Campus |
| Henry Ford West Bloomfield Hospital | West Bloomfield | 191 | Level III | 2009 | |
| Henry Ford Madison Heights Hospital | Madison Heights | 159 | Level IV | | formerly Ascension Macomb-Oakland Hospital Madison Heights Campus |
| Henry Ford River District Hospital | East China Township | 68 | Level IV | | formerly Ascension River District Hospital |
| Henry Ford Kingswood Hospital | Royal Oak Township | 100 | None | 1965 | Psychiatric hospital |

== Medical centers ==
Henry Ford Health operates 46 medical centers along with 250+ locations throughout Michigan including five acute care hospitals, two destination facilities for complex cancer and orthopedics and sports medicine care, three behavioral health facilities, primary care and urgent care centers.
