= Jacob and Rebecca Fuerst Farmstead =

- U.S. National Register of Historic Places
- U.S. Historic district
- Michigan State Historic Site
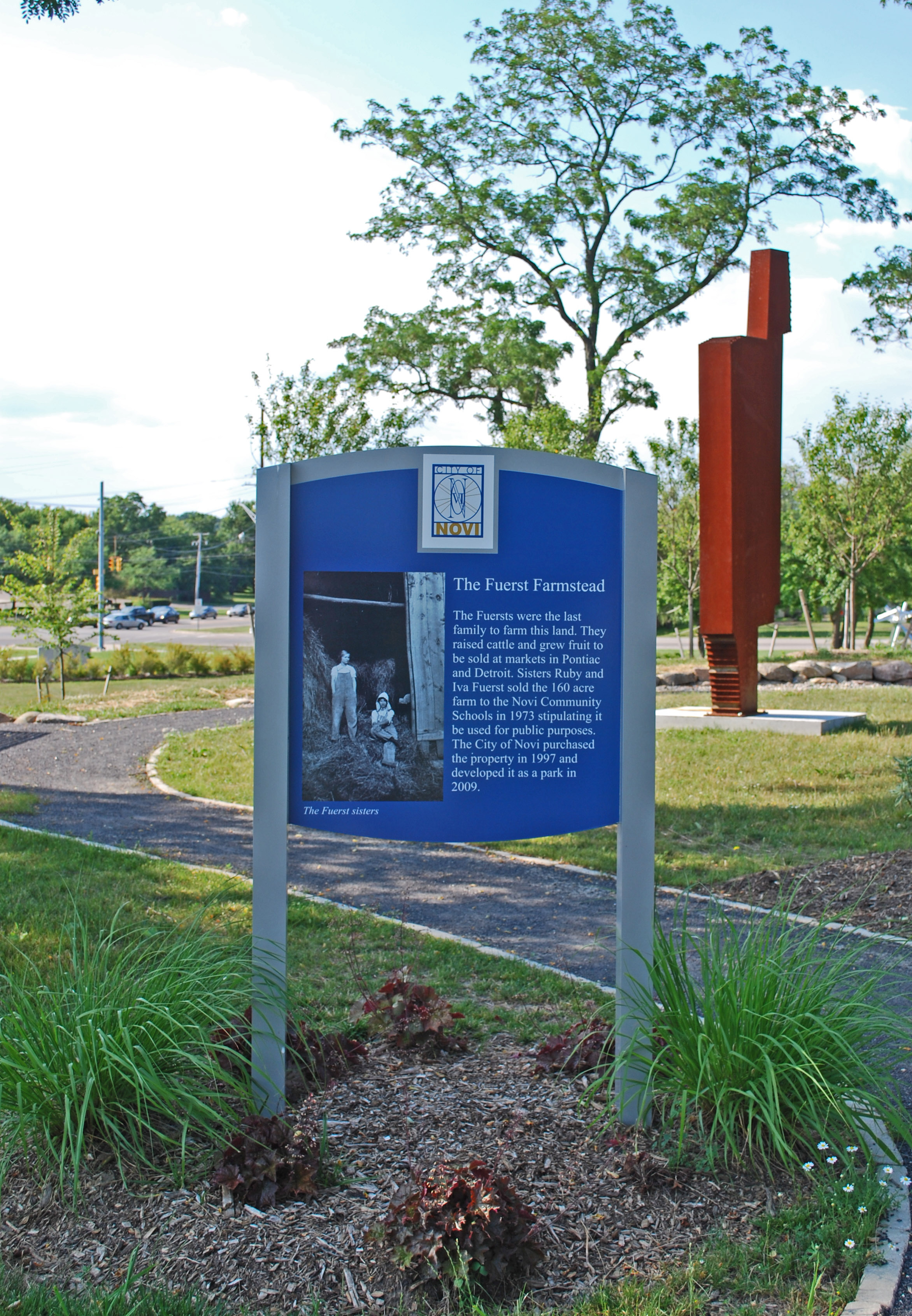

- Location within Michigan Location within the United States
- Interactive map
- Location: 24000 Taft Rd., Novi, Michigan
- Coordinates: 42°27′54″N 83°29′36″W
- Area: 6.5 acres (2.6 ha)
- Architectural style: Bungalow, American Craftsman
- NRHP reference No.: 97000928
- Added to NRHP: August 21, 1997

The Jacob and Rebecca Fuerst Farmstead was a farm located at 24000 Taft Road in Novi, Michigan. It was listed on the National Register of Historic Places in 1997. The farm was demolished in 2008 and the property redeveloped into Fuerst Park.

== History ==
The Fuerst Farm land was first developed in 1827 by Gamaliel Simmons, who purchased this quarter section of land. The farm passed through several owners in the next few years; historical records suggest that a Greek Revival frame house was constructed on the property at some point before 1830. In 1836, the farm was purchased by George Dennis, who made improvements and constructed outbuildings on the farm. Dennis and his family owned the property until 1898, when it was purchased by James and Minnie Dunham. It is likely that the Dunhams leased the property before purchase, possibly as early as 1889.

In 1918 the farm was purchased by the Jacob and Rebecca Fuerst family, who at the time owned a farm in Greenfield Township. By 1918, the city of Detroit was encroaching on Greenfield Township, and the original Fuerst farm was platted as a subdivision. farm already had some orchards planted, but the Fuersts developed them further, turning the farm into a thriving business selling fruit, eggs, and butter.

In 1931 the Fuersts demolished the old Greek Revival house on the property and built a new bungalow. Rebecca and Jacob Fuerst lived on the farm until their deaths, Jacob in 1941 and Rebecca in 1954. Afterward, their daughters Ruby and Iva remained on the farm. The Fuerst sisters sold their 160 acres of land to the city of Novi in the 1970s for a token amount, retaining a life lease on this five-acre farmstead parcel. The Fuerst sisters both died in 1991.

The farm was demolished in 2008 and the property redeveloped into Fuerst Park.

== Description ==
The site of the Fuerst Farmstead is on a 6 1/2-acre site featuring a small hill atop which the farmhouse once stood. The site contains the remains of a fruit orchard, primarily pears and apples. Other shrubs and trees, including lilac, honeysuckle, buckthorn, barberry, sugar maple, and black walnut trees dot the site. The farmstead once consisted of a 1927 house, four barns, and a few smaller outbuildings.

Most significant were the house and the 1876 Old Barn. The house was a 2500-square-foot Arts and Crafts structure, sided with wood on a fieldstone foundation. A stone porch ran the length of the house, and a massive stone chimney dominated one side of the house. The Old Barn was a wood-framed structure with a front gable roof on a fieldstone basement. The barn was built into the side of the hill, so that the basement level could be accessed from below.

The site has been redeveloped into a park, and contains an amphitheater, large gardens, and the historic Novi Township Hall, which was relocated onto the site.

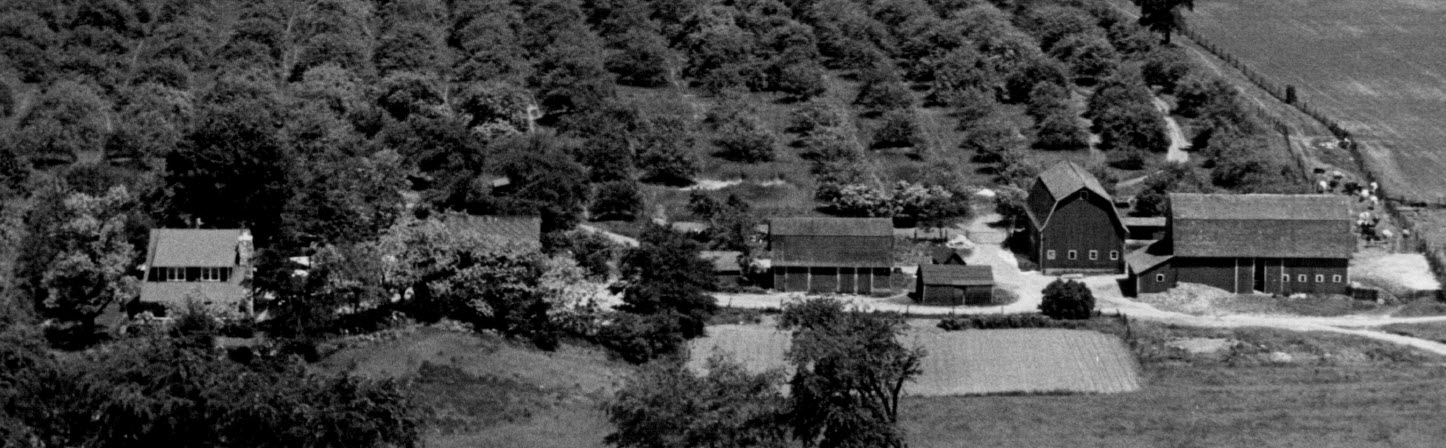
Fuerst Farm c 1950

== Public art ==
Fuerst Park has several sculptures on display:

- Apollo (Kathy Rose Pizzo)
- Blue Square Back (Gary Kulak)
- Bouquet (Andrew Kline)
- The Surveyor (Charlie O’Geen)
- Sonata (David Barr)
- Strum and Drang (John Sauve)

== See also ==
- National Register of Historic Places listings in Oakland County, Michigan
