= Seigakuin University =

Coordinates: 35°56′16.6″N 139°35′46.3″E

- 聖学院大学
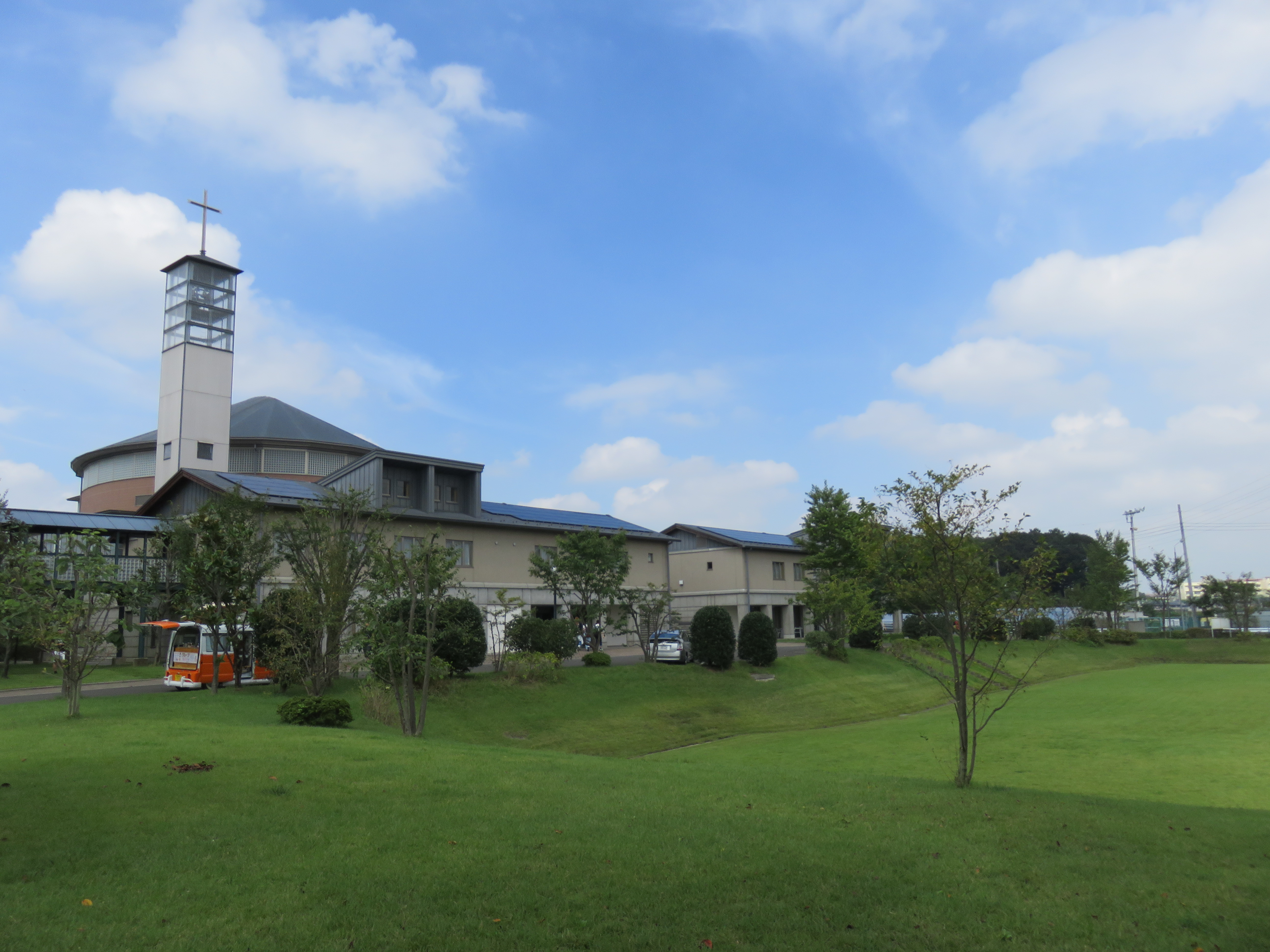
- Motto: Love God and Serve His People
- Type: Private
- Established: 1903, university from 1988
- Affiliations: Christian Church (Disciples of Christ)
- Location: Ageo, Saitama, Japan
- Website: www.seigakuin.jp

Seigakuin University (聖学院大学, Seigakuin daigaku) is a private university in Ageo, Saitama, Japan, established in 1988. The motto is "Love God and Serve His People."

The university bases its ideals on Protestant Christianity. The former Seigakuin Atlanta International School was an international school in Greater Atlanta, United States affiliated with the university.

The predecessor of the school was founded in 1903 as a Protestant seminary.

== See also ==
- Joshi Seigakuin Junior & Senior High School
- Seigakuin Atlanta International School
