= Hinoki International School =

- ひのきインターナショナルスクール

Location
- 36611 Curtis Road; Livonia, Michigan 48152; United States

Information
- Type: Charter
- Motto: To provide Japanese and American students with an opportunity to learn from each other, and become bilingual, bicultural, and globally-minded individuals.
- Established: 2010
- Closed: 2015
- Faculty: 10
- Website: Official website (archived October 10, 2013)

Hinoki International School (previously known as the Japanese American School of South East Michigan or JASSEM) was a two-way Japanese-English language immersion elementary school in Livonia, Michigan in Metro Detroit which opened in 2010 as a charter school. It closed in 2015 before a planned opening of a new Farmington Hills, Michigan campus.

== History ==
Hinoki International School was established in 2010 as the Japanese American School of South East Michigan (JASSEM, or 南東ミシガン日米学校), by Ted Delphia, co-owner of Himawari Preschool and head of the Michigan Japanese Bilingual Education Foundation (MJBEF), a 501(c)(3) public charity. The elementary school was started as a charter school with Livonia Public Schools (LPS) as charter authorizer and landlord. Using over $500,000 in Federal Charter school program grants and input from Eastern Michigan University's World Language Department, Hinoki enrolled 13 students in 2010 in a single kindergarten class. They grew to 133 students in grades K-3 in 2013-14. The school was originally housed in the former McKinley Elementary School, and later moved to the former Taylor Elementary School.

Hinoki had 185 students enrolled for 2014-15 when it received notice that MJBEF would be withdrawing as educational service provider. Randy Liepa, the then-superintendent of Livonia schools, asked the board of the Hinoki school to merge with the Livonia School District. In May 2014, the Hinoki board voted to follow the recommendations of Hinoki parents and the PTO, and remain a charter school while entering into talks with LPS about possibly becoming part of that district in 2015-16.

Liepa declined to renew the lease of the Livonia school facility. On July 28, Livonia Public Schools (LPS) revoked the Hinoki charter since the charter school had no building. LPS then opened a district-operated school-of-choice elementary school with a similar program, called the Niji-Iro Japanese Immersion Elementary School, located at the former Hinoki campus. Anne Hooghart, the president of the school board, accused Delphia of conspiring with LPS to take control of the school without the board's consent, while Delphia denied this. Karen Smith of O & E Media wrote that "Hinoki stakeholders viewed the Livonia board's actions as a hostile takeover of their school, recruiting teachers and students without the Hinoki board's knowledge."

Hinoki was granted a new charter from Saginaw Valley State University, and moved to 29230 W. 12 Mile Road, Farmington Hills, Michigan, and began enrolling students in Kindergarten through 5th grade for fall 2015.

In June 2015, the building in which Hinoki planned to open was sold to a private school, Aim High School. Hinoki was required to vacate the building by October 2015. On September 11, 2015 the Hinoki School board voted to dissolve.

== Curriculum ==
Hinoki's Japanese-English immersion program was a blend of both Japanese pedagogy and Michigan’s educational standards within the framework of a dual language classroom. Each class was taught by a pair of teachers—one native speaker of English and one native speaker of Japanese—who took turns instructing the students in all core subjects areas, alternating the language of instruction for each lesson. The student body included both native Japanese speakers and native English speakers so that each students had a "target language" in which he/she can strengthen his/her skills with the help of his/her teachers and peers.

== See also ==
- History of the Japanese in Metro Detroit
- Sundai Michigan International Academy
- Consulate-General of Japan, Detroit
- International Charter Academy of Georgia - Charter bilingual elementary school in Metro Atlanta
- Japanese language education in the United States
