= Novi Community School District =

School district in Michigan

Address
- 25425 Taft Road Novi, Oakland County, Michigan, 48374; United States

District information
- Type: Public
- Grades: PreKindergarten-12
- Superintendent: Ben Mainka
- Schools: 11
- Budget: $151,504,000 (2022-2023 expeditures)
- NCES District ID: 2626130

Students and staff
- Students: 6,770 (2024-2025)
- Teachers: 412.52 FTE (2024-2025)
- Staff: 808.75 FTE (2024-2025)
- Student–teacher ratio: 16.41 (2024-2025)
- District mascot: Wildcats

Other information
- Website: www.novi.k12.mi.us

Novi Community School District is a public school district in Metro Detroit, Michigan. It serves most of Novi and portions of Wixom.

== History ==
The northern half of Novi Meadows Elementary was built in 1964 with an addition built on the west end of the building in 1968 and served as Novi High School from 1968-1977. Starting in the 1978-1979 school year it became Novi Middle School North. The southern part of the building was built in 1971 and initially housed grades 6-8 and served as Novi Middle school until 1978 when the 6th grade was moved over to Novi Middle School North. In 1978, Novi Middle School became known as Novi Middle School South.

The architecture firm Richard Prince and Associates presented schematic designs for the current Novi High School to the school board in fall 1974. The campus would have two buildings, one for sports and academics and a round single-story building to contain student lockers, cafeteria, commons, book store and radio station. It was reasoned that these rooms would disturb the quiet of the academic areas, but a covered passageway was considered to connect the buildings.

In late August 1977, the high school was dedicated during a multi-day celebration. It included demonstrations by the athletic teams, a fish fry, art exhibition, and a speech by former Lieutenant Governor of Michigan James H. Brickley.

Novi Middle School was built on an old horse farm at the intersection of Wixom and 11 Mile roads in 1998. Prior to that time, Novi Middle School was located in what is now the southern portion of the current Novi Meadows School.

In the decade leading up to 2005, the school district's enrollment increased from 3,790 to 6,150 and the budget increased from $29 million (about $61274295.7 when adjusted for inflation) to $60 million (about $98909524.62 when adjusted for inflation). Around 2005 district administrators anticipated that newly established housing developments in northern and western Novi would add 1,600 houses to the district.

The Early Childhood Education Center opened in fall 2016.

Funded by a bond issue in 2019, Novi Meadows Elementary was substantially reconstructed and reopened anew in fall 2023. Portions of the building vacated by the former school became STEM and robotics labs, which opened in 2026.

In 2025, a $425 million bond issue passed to significantly renovate Novi High School and build an indoor sports complex on the campus. Several additions have been built at the high school over the years, and district leaders felt that the building was difficult to navigate, lacked natural light, and had heating and cooling problems. The bond issue will also fund the reconfiguring of interior spaces and the addition of an Innovation Hub, or career and technical education wing.

== Japanese School of Detroit ==
In 2010, the Japanese School of Detroit (JSD), a supplementary educational institution that offers Japanese classes on Saturdays, announced that it was relocating to Novi. It entered into a 10-year agreement with the school district and began to use Novi Meadows Elementary School to conduct classes. Superintendent Steve Matthews said that he expected for the Japanese population in the school district to increase due to the move of JSD.

After the 2011 Tōhoku earthquake and tsunami occurred, the school district advised school staff to be sensitive to students who may have been affected by the disaster, as many of the district's students were Japanese or of Japanese descent.

== Schools ==
Schools in Novi Community School District
School	Address	Notes
Novi High School	24062 Taft Road, Novi	Grades 9-12
Novi Middle School	49000 Eleven Mile Road, Novi	Grades 7-8
Novi Meadows Elementary	25549 Taft Road, Novi	Grades 5-6
Deerfield Elementary	26500 Wixom Road, Novi	Grades K-4
Novi Woods Elementary	25195 Taft Road, Novi	Grades K-4
Orchard Hills Elementary	41900 Quince, Novi	Grades K-4
Parkview Elementary	45825 Eleven Mile Road, Novi	Grades K-4
Village Oaks Elementary	23333 Willowbrook, Novi	Grades K-4
Novi Early Childhood Education Center	25745 Taft Road, Novi	Preschool
Novi Virtual	41500 Gardenbrook, Novi	Online learning options for grades K-12.
Career Prep High School/Adult Education	41500 Gardenbrook, Novi	Alternative high school for ages 17-22.
