= Novi, Michigan =

- City
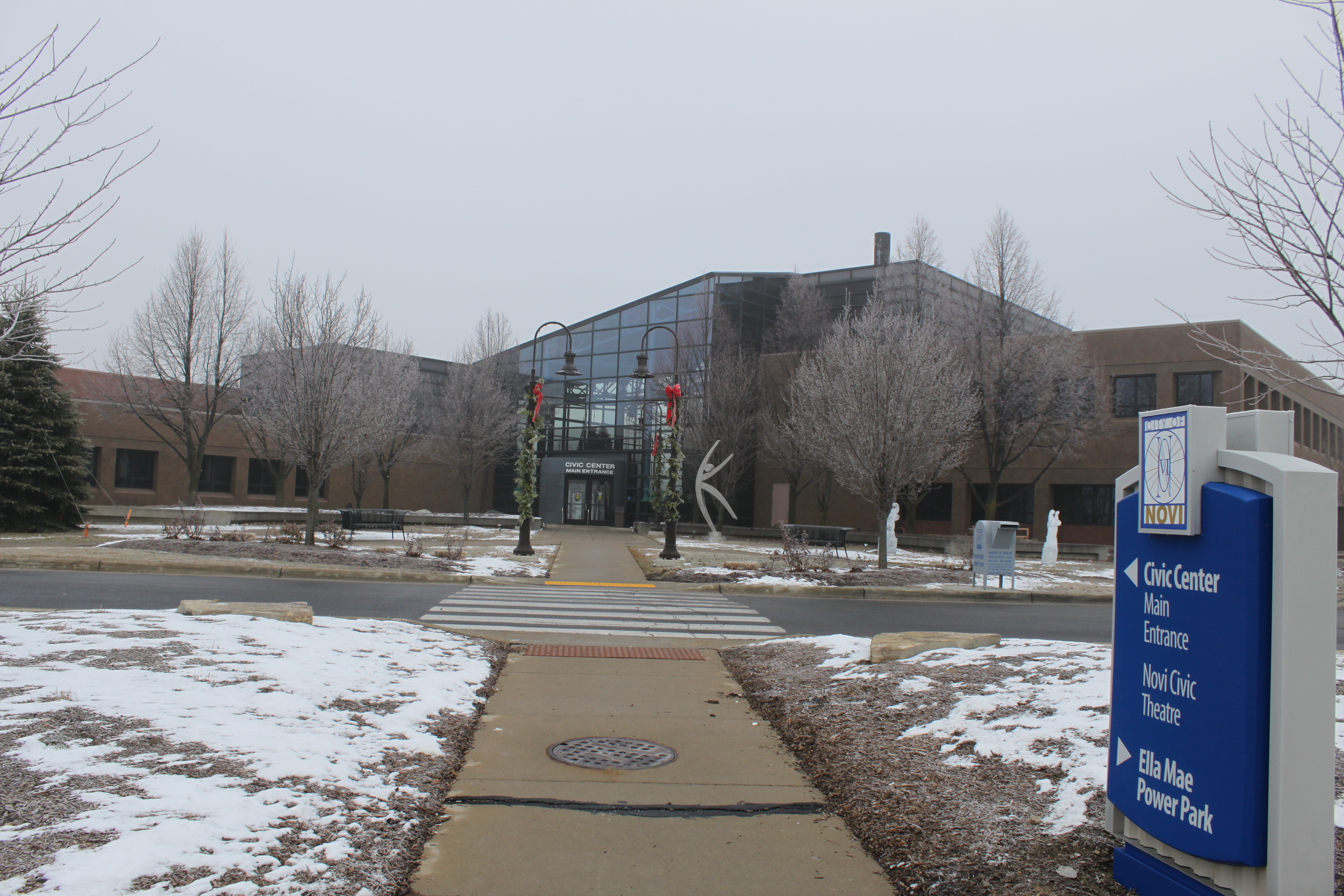
- Novi Civic Center

- Seal
- Interactive map of Novi, Michigan
- Location within Michigan Location within the United States
- Coordinates: 42°28′49″N 83°28′39″W
- Country: United States
- State: Michigan
- County: Oakland
- Organized: 1832 (as Novi Township)
- Incorporated: 1969 (city)

Government
  - Type: Council-manager
  - Mayor: Justin Fischer
  - Manager: Victor Cardenas
  - Clerk: Cortney Hanson

Area
  - City: 31.29 sq mi (81.04 km^{2})
  - Land: 30.24 sq mi (78.33 km^{2})
  - Water: 1.05 sq mi (2.71 km^{2})
- Elevation: 909 ft (277 m)

Population (2020)
  - City: 66,243
  - Density: 2,190.3/sq mi (845.69/km^{2})
  - Metro: 4,296,250 (Metro Detroit)
- Time zone: UTC-5 (EST)
  - Summer (DST): UTC-4 (EDT)
- ZIP code(s): 48167 (Northville); 48374–48377
- Area code: 248
- FIPS code: 26-59440
- GNIS feature ID: 0633773
- Website: Official website

Novi (/ˈnoʊvaɪ/ NOH-vy) is a city in Oakland County in the U.S. state of Michigan. A northwestern suburb of Detroit, Novi is located roughly 25 miles (40.2 km) northwest of downtown Detroit. As of the 2020 census, the city had a population of 66,243, an increase of 20% from the 2010 census.

== History ==
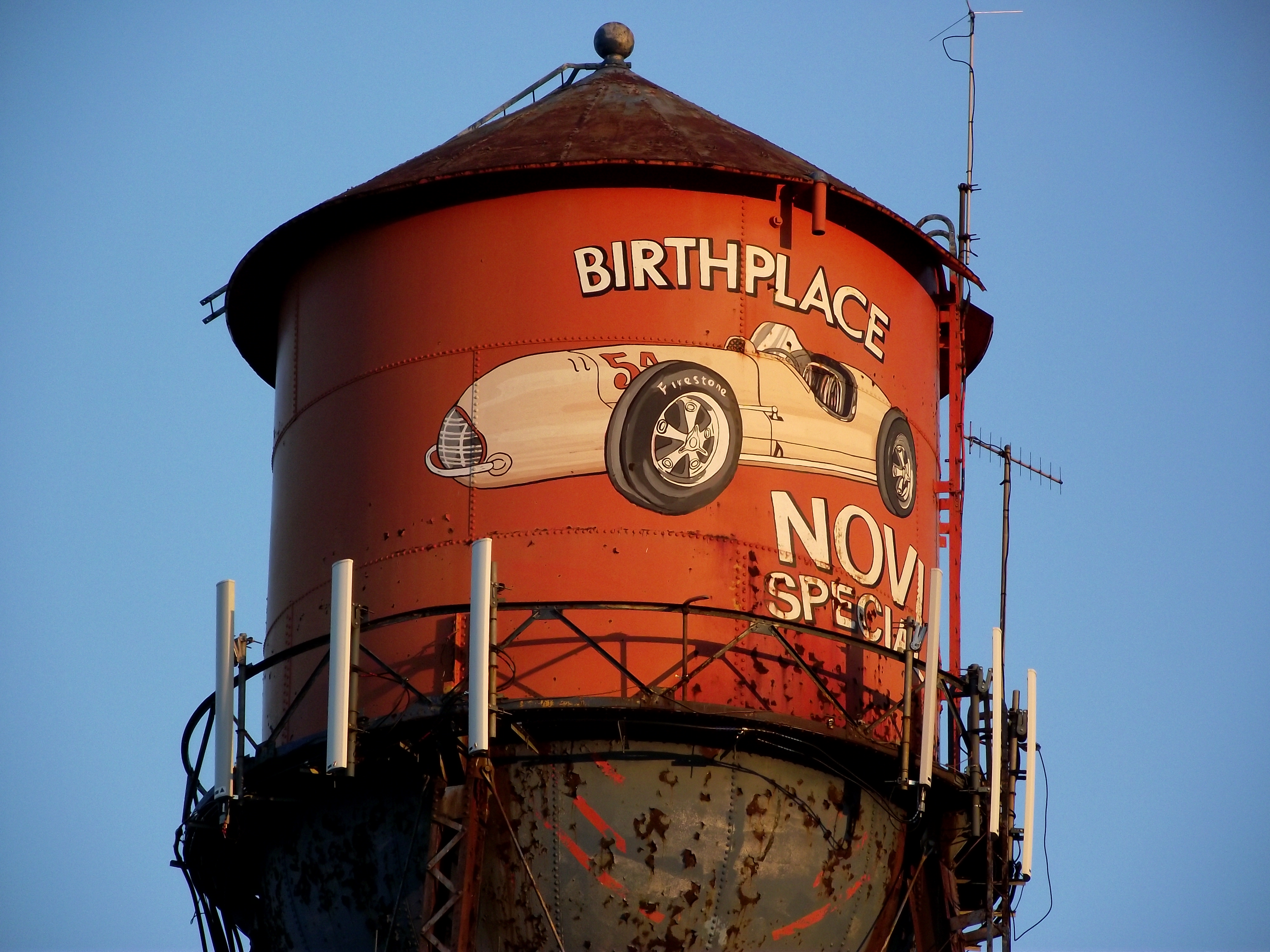
Water tower in Novi, noting "Birthplace Novi Special"

Novi was organized as a township in 1832, on land taken from Farmington Township. The name Novi was offered by resident Dr. J. C. Emery, at the suggestion of his wife. Residents were reportedly looking for a shorter name than Farmington.

A local account has said that it was named after the sixth toll gate (No. VI) on the Grand River Road. However, the township was named in 1832 and the toll road was not constructed until the 1850s. Another account said that it was the sixth stagecoach stop outside Detroit. Similarly, the township was said to be stop six (or VI) on the railroad, but the Holly, Wayne & Monroe Railway (now CSX Transportation) was not constructed through the township until 1870–71, almost 40 years after the organization and naming of the township.

Novi was incorporated as a city in 1969 after the approval of a city charter on February 18, 1969, by Village of Novi voters. Charter approval followed an election on May 20, 1968, in which voters approved the incorporation of the city: the vote was 694 in favor and 283 votes against. The charter became effective on February 24, 1969. There had been several previous attempts by organizers to incorporate as a city. The city was incorporated along the boundaries of the existing Village of Novi, and grew quickly in the latter half of the 20th century as second- and third-stage waves of white flight from the City of Detroit and older suburbs resulted in more extensive urban sprawl in the region.

=== Historic sites ===
- The historic Township Hall was originally located on Novi Road, south of Grand River. It was moved to the Novi Library property in the 1980s. It was recently relocated again onto the property that was the site of the Jacob and Rebecca Fuerst Farmstead.
- Tollgate Farm is a 160-acre (650,000m^{2}) farmstead and educational center.
- The Colonel Samuel White Homestead site is identified by a Michigan Historical Marker.
- A portion of the original Novi Depot was constructed in 1871 for the Holly, Wayne and Monroe Railroad (now absorbed by CSX Transportation).
- The Jacob and Rebecca Fuerst Farmstead was a historic site listed on the National Register of Historic Places. The City of Novi demolished the Fuerst Farmstead in order to develop the site for other historic uses. The north barn was destroyed on July 16, 2008. The farm house was demolished in August 2008. The south and east barns were dismantled and removed from the site. None of the original buildings of the Farmstead was preserved on the site. But the historic Township Hall was relocated to this site.

== Geography ==
According to the United States Census Bureau, the city has a total area of 31.29 square miles (81.04 km^{2}), of which 30.25 square miles (78.35 km^{2}) is land and 1.04 square miles (2.69 km^{2}) (3.32%) is water.

The city is located on Walled Lake which lies mainly within Novi and is the largest lake in the city. It also serves as the headwaters of the Middle Branch of the Rouge River. Shawood Lake is southwest of Walled Lake. Several smaller lakes within the city were created by gravel pit mining or as stormwater retention areas. Most of the city lies within the Rouge River watershed. Some areas on the north and west side of the city are part of the Huron River watershed.

Three major freeways converge in Novi. The city's location provides direct access to several major freeways including I-96, I-696, I-275, and M-5.

The city is located within the boundaries of the survey township of Novi Township, which now also includes portions of the cities of Northville and Walled Lake. The remaining unincorporated township is only a tiny fraction of 0.11 square miles (0.28 km^{2}) surrounded by the city.

== Economy ==
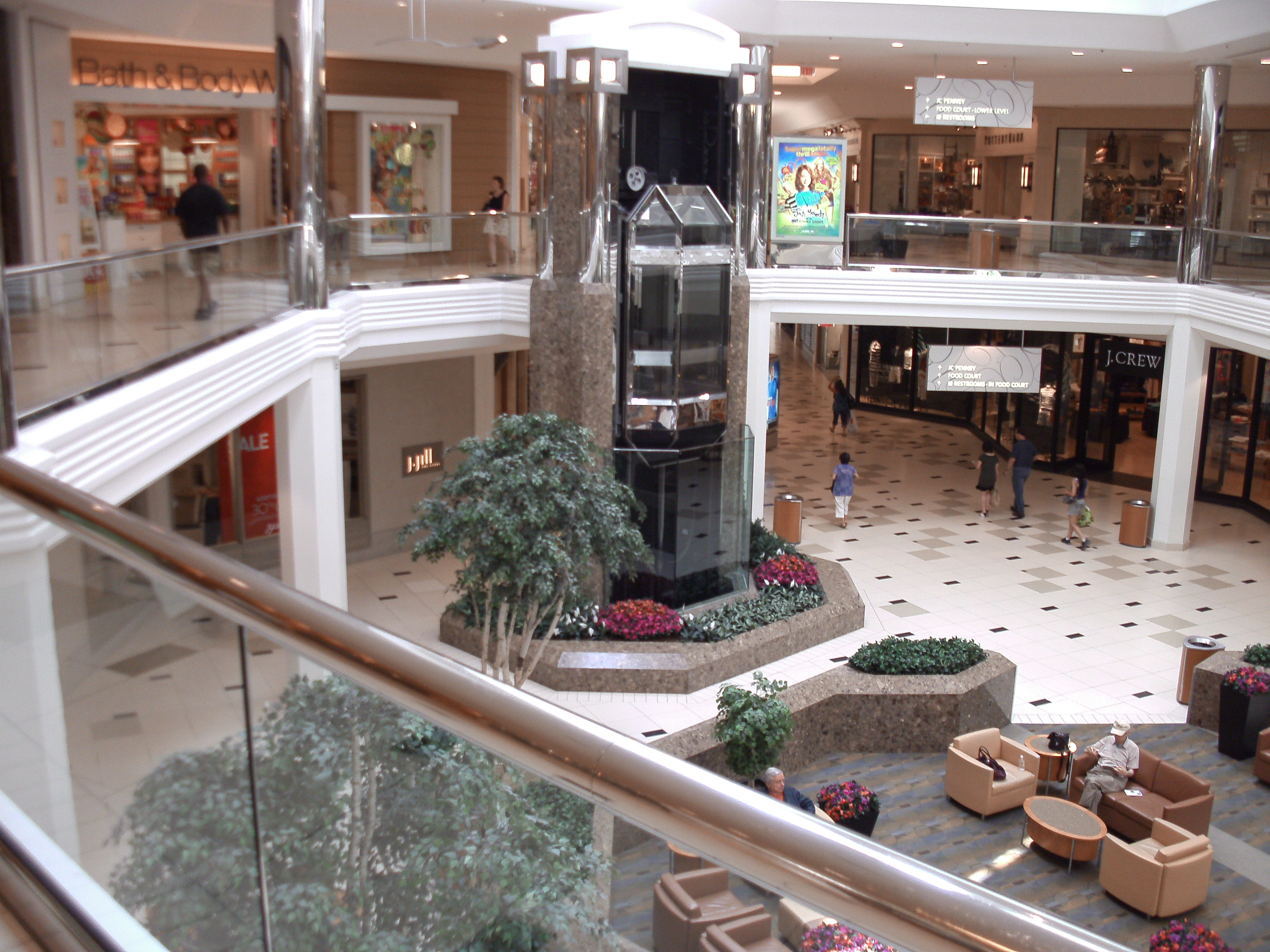
The Twelve Oaks Mall in Novi contains over 180 stores.

Novi continues to be one of the fastest-growing cities in Michigan. The construction of Twelve Oaks Mall in 1977 made the city a major shopping destination in the Detroit metropolitan area and is often credited with ushering in an era of growth that lasted for 40 years (although, in fact, the community had been growing rapidly since the 1950s). This growth has led to substantial increases in the city's population, as well as commercial and industrial developments in the city. Novi was ranked #48 on Money magazine's list of the Top 100 Best Places to Live in 2008. As of January 2009 Novi has over 1,600 businesses.

Novi's economy includes international corporations with local and regional offices as well as owner-operated businesses serving the local area. While Novi is recognized for its large concentration of retail businesses clustered at the Novi Road and I-96 interchange, there are several large retail centers in the city as well as many individual retail businesses. Novi has car dealerships along Haggerty Road and Grand River Avenue. The city's industrial and office parks are home to companies in high tech research and development, health care, transportation and logistics, manufacturing and domestic and foreign automotive-related suppliers. Energy-related companies are one of the fastest-growing sectors in the city. These companies include the headquarters for ITC Transmission, Novi Energy and offices of Patrick Energy Services.

The business community in Novi is represented by the Novi Chamber of Commerce.

Kroger operates its Michigan regional offices at 40399 Grand River Avenue in Novi. The Japan Auto Parts Industries Association, North America has its offices in Novi. Toyota Boshoku America opened in a Novi office in 2002, with 10 employees. As of April 2013 the company has two office buildings in Novi with 210 total employees, with about 30 of them being Japanese assignees. Ted Schafer, the vice president of the Technical Center, said that Novi was selected due to the community and schools friendly to Japanese people, and the proximity to General Motors offices, Toyota offices, and Detroit Metropolitan Wayne County Airport. In December 2009 American Mitsuba Corp. moved to Novi, and as of April 2013 the office employs 32 people, and increase from when it was first established. The senior vice president, David Martin Stevens, said that the location was chosen due to the quality of the office building.

Novi ranks among the top Oakland County communities for research, technology and service companies. To manage growth and attract commerce, Novi partners with local, state and federal agencies to enhance infrastructure. Novi has a Neighborhoods and Business Relations Group to attract and retain businesses and has streamlined many of its planning and approvals processes to encourage new business and development, as well as redevelopment. The enhancements are intended to speed the process, allowing businesses to move ahead with plans for relocation or expansion. Novi has attracted several international firms, such as Howa USA Holdings, a Japanese auto supplier with a research and development center in Novi specializing in interior components for vehicles.

Ryder System Inc. constructed a new regional headquarters, representing a $22 million investment in the community. ITC Transmission Company, the nation's largest independent electrical transmission company, made Novi its national headquarters. In 2008, St. John Providence Park opened a 200-bed hospital on a 200-acre (0.81 km^{2}) parcel. In addition to the hospital, the wooded campus includes walking and cycling paths and 18 acres (73,000 m^{2}) of health-related retail.

Over the last few years, Novi has focused its economic development efforts on the telematics and car connectivity industries. Within the telematics industry, more than 5,000 firms employ approximately 70,000 people in Oakland County, many of them employed in Novi. Those firms in Novi include Cooper-Standard Automotive, NXP, Elektrobit, and Harman/Becker Automotive. Tognum, based in Germany, is scheduled to relocate its headquarters to Novi on Haggerty Road, between 13 and 14 Mile Roads.

Around 2008 the median house price was in the upper $260,000s.

=== Top employers ===
According to the city's 2023 Comprehensive Annual Financial Report, the top public and private sector employers in the city are:

#	Employer	# of employees
1	St. John Health / Providence Park Hospital	2,230
2	Novi Community Schools	905
3	Harman	848
4	Ryder System	660
5	Lineage Logistics	655
6	ITC Holding, Inc.	544
7	Yanfeng	475
8	Intier / Magna	379
9	Hanon	351
10	Fox Run	306

== Health care ==
Novi is home to some of the region's largest health care systems. Henry Ford Health operates the Henry Ford Providence Novi Hospital off of Interstate 96 and Beck Road. It has a capacity for fewer than 400 patients, and it is located on a 64-acre (26 ha) site that also includes medical office building and neuroscience institute, a hotel with 100 rooms, and an orthopedic center that houses an ambulatory surgical center. Construction on the hospital began in 2005 and lasted for three years. The total cost was about $220 million. The architecture firm that designed the hospital was NBBJ and the engineering firm was Korda. The hospital design includes a six-story atrium that allows natural sunlight. It opened in September 2008.

Henry Ford Health operates the Henry Ford Medical Center - Columbus. Services at the location include primary care, behavioral health services, cancer treatment, diabetes care, endoscopy, infusion services, lymphedema services, MOHs surgery, MRIs, and rehabilitation services and travel clinic. Corewell Health has two speciality facilities in Novi.

== Parks and recreation ==
Most of the farmland and open spaces present in the mid-20th century have been developed. The exceptions include the Tollgate Farm located at the northwest corner of the intersection of Twelve Mile and Meadowbrook Roads. This farmstead is owned by the Americana Foundation and is currently leased and operated by Michigan State University as an agricultural extension. Lakeshore Park is another prominent natural area. The park is located between Walled Lake and Twelve Mile Road, west of Novi Road. While portions of the park were turned over to a developer to settle a lawsuit, it remains one of the largest municipal parks in southeast Michigan. Ella Mae Power Park, located behind the Novi Civic Center, hosts softball and baseball games and tournaments.

In 2004, the City of Novi negotiated for the donation of several parcels of parkland on the west side of the city. These properties, along with several adjoining parcels owned by the city, preserve 253 acres (1.02 km^{2}) of environmentally sensitive areas in the Huron River watershed. In 2005, the City of Novi was awarded a Michigan Natural Resources Trust Fund (MNRTF) grant to acquire 54 acres (22 ha) two areas of environmentally sensitive property in southeast Novi within the Rouge River watershed. The properties were acquired in 2009. In 2007, the city was awarded a second MNRTF grant to acquire 16 acres (65,000 m^{2}) of natural area in southwest Novi within the headwaters of the Huron River watershed. The property was acquired in 2010. In 2010, the city was awarded a third MNRTF grant to develop the city-owned property on the south end of Walled Lake, once the site of the Walled Lake Casino and Amusement Park, into a public park. That property is now the Pavilion Shore Park.

Each year in October, the Japan Festival is held in the city. It is the largest Japan festival in the state.

== Government ==
Novi operates under the council-manager form of government. It is governed by a 7-member city council, consisting of a mayor elected to two-year terms, and six other councilmembers elected to staggered four-year terms. Councilmembers serve part-time, at-large, and without pay, and are elected in a nonpartisan capacity in odd-numbered years. The council elects one of its members to serve as mayor pro tempore.

Current councilmembers
Councilmember	Serving since	Term expires
Justin Fischer (mayor)	2023	2027
Laura Marie Casey	2011	2027
Priya Gurumurthy	2023	2029
Matt Heintz	2023	2027
Brian Smith	2021	2029
David Staudt	2007	2027
Aaron Martinez	2025	2029

The city council appoints a city manager, who oversees the day-to-day operations of the city. The first city charter was adopted by the voters in 1969. The last major charter revision was in 1977.

=== Federal, state, and county legislators ===
Most of Novi is located in Michigan's 6th congressional district, while a small portion is located in the 11th congressional district.

United States House of Representatives
District	Representative	Party	Since
6th	Debbie Dingell	Democratic	2023
11th	Haley Stevens	Democratic	2019

Michigan Senate
District	Senator	Party	Since
13th	Rosemary Bayer	Democratic	2023
23rd	Jim Runestad	Republican	2019 (Note: Runestad has represented all or part of Novi since 2019, but has only represented the 23rd district since 2023.)

Michigan House of Representatives
District	Representative	Party	Since
21st	Kelly Breen	Democratic	2021 (Note: Breen has represented all or part of Novi since 2021, but has only represented the 21st district since 2023.)
49th	Ann Bollin	Republican	2023

Oakland County Board of Commissioners
District	Commissioner	Party	Since
14th	Robert Smiley	Republican	2025
15th	Gwen Markham	Democratic	2019

== Demographics ==
Historical population
Census	Pop.	Note	%±
1970	9,668		—
1980	22,525		133.0%
1990	32,998		46.5%
2000	47,386		43.6%
2010	55,224		16.5%
2020	66,243		20.0%
2023 (est.)	66,314		0.1%
U.S. Decennial Census

=== 2020 census ===
As of the 2020 census, Novi had a population of 66,243. The median age was 39.6 years. 23.3% of residents were under the age of 18 and 15.4% of residents were 65 years of age or older. For every 100 females there were 94.2 males, and for every 100 females age 18 and over there were 91.5 males age 18 and over.

99.7% of residents lived in urban areas, while 0.3% lived in rural areas.

There were 26,458 households in Novi, of which 33.3% had children under the age of 18 living in them. Of all households, 54.5% were married-couple households, 16.2% were households with a male householder and no spouse or partner present, and 25.1% were households with a female householder and no spouse or partner present. About 29.7% of all households were made up of individuals and 12.9% had someone living alone who was 65 years of age or older.

There were 27,863 housing units, of which 5.0% were vacant. The homeowner vacancy rate was 0.9% and the rental vacancy rate was 8.0%.

Racial composition as of the 2020 census
Race	Number	Percent
White	38,476	58.1%
Black or African American	5,040	7.6%
American Indian and Alaska Native	117	0.2%
Asian	17,802	26.9%
Native Hawaiian and Other Pacific Islander	27	0.0%
Some other race	954	1.4%
Two or more races	3,827	5.8%
Hispanic or Latino (of any race)	2,686	4.1%

=== 2010 census ===
As of the census of 2010, there were 55,224 people, 22,258 households, and 14,599 families residing in the city. The population density was 1,825.0 inhabitants per square mile (704.6/km^{2}). There were 24,226 housing units at an average density of 800.6 per square mile (309.1/km^{2}). The racial makeup of the city was 73.0% White, 8.1% African American, 0.2% Native American, 15.9% Asian, 0.7% from other races, and 2.1% from two or more races. Hispanic or Latino residents of any race were 3.0% of the population.

There were 22,258 households, of which 35.2% had children under the age of 18 living with them, 54.1% were married couples living together, 8.6% had a female householder with no husband present, 2.9% had a male householder with no wife present, and 34.4% were non-families. 29.5% of all households were made up of individuals, and 9.9% had someone living alone who was 65 years of age or older. The average household size was 2.46 and the average family size was 3.11.

The median age in the city was 39.1 years. 25.5% of residents were under the age of 18; 6.6% were between the ages of 18 and 24; 28% were from 25 to 44; 28.6% were from 45 to 64; and 11.3% were 65 years of age or older. The gender makeup of the city was 48.4% male and 51.6% female.

=== 2000 census ===
In 2000, there were 18,726 households, out of which 36.3% had children under the age of 18 living with them, 56.2% were married couples living together, 7.1% had a female householder with no husband present, and 34.2% were non-families. 28.1% of all households were made up of individuals, and 5.9% had someone living alone who was 65 years of age or older. The average household size was 2.52 and the average family size was 3.17.

In the city, 27.6% of the population was under the age of 18, 6.7% was from 18 to 24, 35.7% from 25 to 44, 21.9% from 45 to 64, and 8.1% was 65 years of age or older. The median age was 35 years. For every 100 females, there were 96.9 males. For every 100 females age 18 and over, there were 93.4 males.

The median income for a household in the city in 2000 was $71,918, and the median income for a family was $91,369 (These figures had risen to $78,151 and $101,286 respectively according to a 2007 estimate). Males had a median income of $65,590 versus $38,432 for females. The per capita income for the city was $35,992. About 1.6% of families and 2.2% of the population were below the poverty line, including 2.4% of those under age 18 and 2.7% of those age 65 or over.

=== Japanese population ===
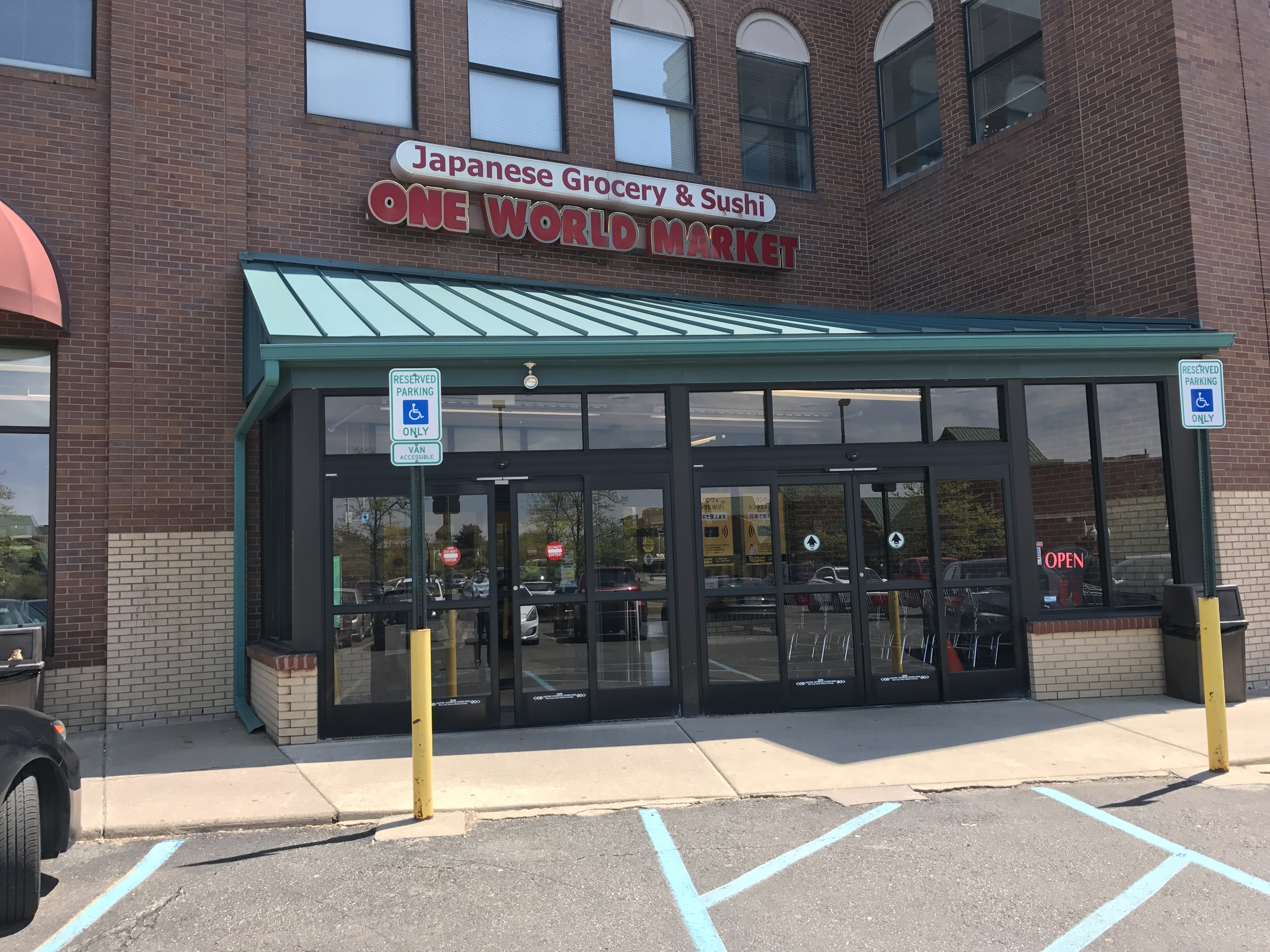
One World Market (ワンワールドマーケット), a Japanese grocery store in Novi

As of 2011, 15.9% of its residents were Asian, and Novi had 2,438 Japanese residents, giving it the largest Japanese population of any Michigan municipality. By 2011, the Japanese population experienced an increase of 53% from 2003, when the city had 1,417 Japanese residents. The economic director of the City of Novi, Ara Topouzian, said "We've been told often by the consulate-general's office or other Japanese officials that they refer to Novi as Little Tokyo because we've been very warm and welcoming and accommodating." Many Japanese in Novi are in the United States on temporary visas which last for three to five years. According to Dr. Andrew Vosburgh of the St. John Providence Health System, many Japanese in Novi work in development, engineering, and research. Their workplaces are located in and around several cities including Novi, Ann Arbor, and Springfield Township. As of April 2013 there are 2,666 Japanese nationals who live in Novi.

The Novi Public Library has Japanese content in the adult and children's sections. The Novi Community School District has enrollment information and other documents available in Japanese. The websites of the City of Novi, the Novi Public Library, and St. John Providence Park Hospital have Japanese welcome messages. The Novi Kroger and the Staybridge Suites extended stay hotel cater to Japanese customers. The hotel stated in 2011 that Japanese make up 30% of its customers, and had increased in a two-year span ending in 2011. The city also has Japanese cultural activities and cultural activities offered in Japanese, including horseback riding lessons conducted in the Japanese language and a Japanese movie night. The hospital offers cultural awareness training for employees, documents translated in Japanese, Japanese translators, and yoga classes conducted in Japanese.

In the 1990s, several Japanese automobile firms had opened offices along M-14. Nissan Motor Co. opened its Farmington Hills office in November 1991. In addition, Toyota established a technical center in Ann Arbor. Novi had gained several Japanese restaurants by the mid-1990s. In summer 2011, the Japanese School of Detroit moved to Novi from Birmingham.

In January 2022, Palstec Industrial Co. Ltd., a publicly traded company based in Hamamatsu City, Shizuoka Prefecture, relocated its local subsidiary to the same city, highlighting the recent trend of Japanese companies moving into the area.

=== Indian/ South Asian population ===
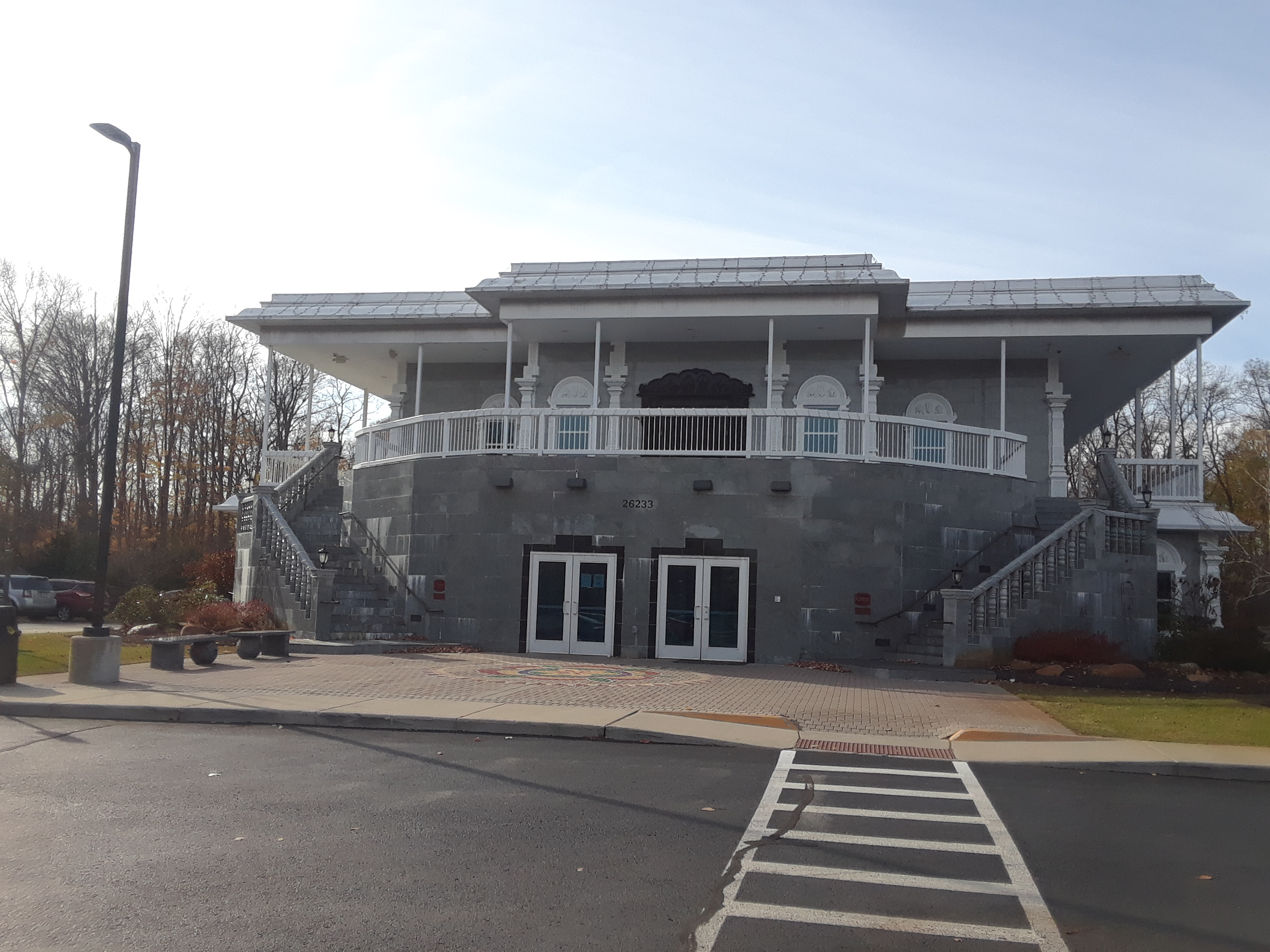
Venkateswara Temple and Cultural Center

The 2008 CNN/Money "Best Places to Live" stated that the city had a significant Asian Indian population. According to the 2000 U.S. census, there were 1,278 ethnic Asian Indians in Novi.

The 25,000-square-foot (2,300 m^{2}) Sri Venkateswara Temple and Cultural Center (SVTCC), built from $10 million, opened in 2013. It is the first Michigan Hindu temple to be named after a southern Indian deity. It had a temporary location for five years before it opened its permanent facility. As of 2013, the temple has a devotee base of about 3,000 people. The community operating the temple mostly comprises Indians who speak Telugu. Many of them originate from Telangana and Andhra Pradesh.

== Education ==
=== Primary and secondary schools ===
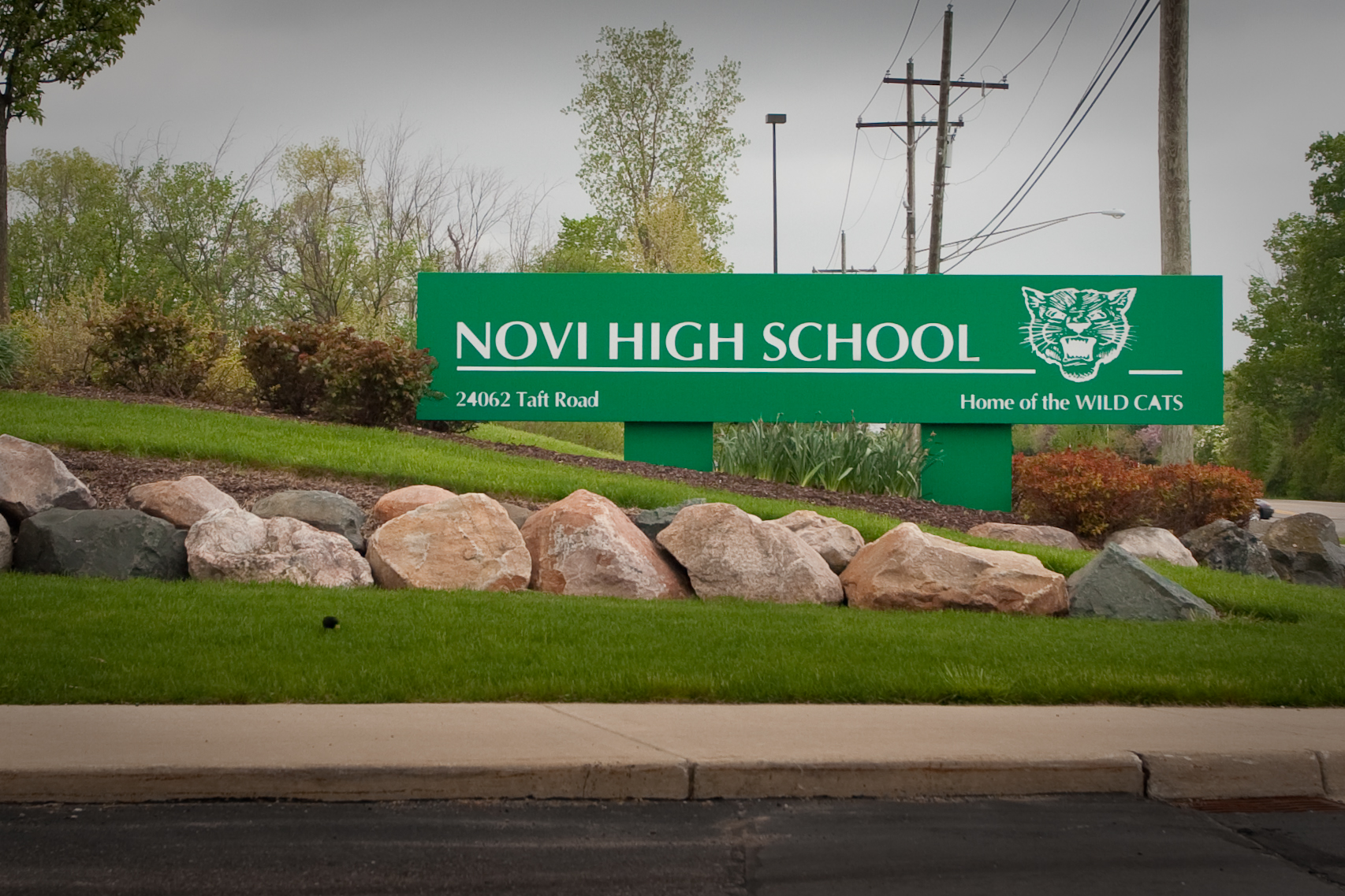
Novi High School entrance sign

Most of Novi is in the Novi Community Schools district, which includes Novi High School, Novi Middle School, and six elementary schools in the city of Novi. A significant portion of the city's south side is located in the Northville Public Schools district, which includes one elementary school in Novi. Another portion is in the Walled Lake Consolidated School District, which includes two elementary schools in Novi. A small portion at the west end is part of the South Lyon Community Schools district.

Private schools include:

- Detroit Catholic Central High School
- Novi Christian Academy

The Catholic K-8 school Our Lady of Victory School in Northville belongs to the Our Lady of Victory Parish, which designated the two Novi Catholic churches (Holy Family and Saint James) as "collaboration partner parishes". St. William Church, which includes sections of Novi in its service area, also operates a Catholic K-8 school, St. William Catholic School, in Walled Lake. The Catholic schools belong to the Roman Catholic Archdiocese of Detroit.

=== Miscellaneous education ===
The Japanese School of Detroit (JSD), a supplementary Japanese school, offers Saturday Japanese classes. It moved to Novi from Birmingham in the summer of 2011.

The Sundai Michigan International Academy (駿台ミシガン国際学院 Sundai Mishigan Kokusai Gakuin), affiliated with the Sundai Center for International Education (駿台国際教育センター Sundai Kokusai Kyōiku Sentā, see 駿台予備学校), is located in Novi. The school's purpose is to prepare Japanese children who have lived in the United States for a long time for a return to Japan, and to assist newly arrived Japanese children who have no fluency of English.

=== Library ===
Novi is served by the Charles and Myrtle Walker Novi Public Library. It first opened in 1960 in a former bank building. An addition, installed in 1964, made the library two times its original size. In 1975, the groundbreaking ceremonies for a 23,190-square-foot (2,154 m^{2}) new library facility were held, and the library opened in 1976. The project to construct the "Dorothy Flattery Wing", the eastern wing, began in 1988. The wing was dedicated on April 22, 1989. The current facility had its groundbreaking in 2008, opening to the public on June 1, 2010.

== Religion ==
The Roman Catholic Archdiocese of Detroit operates Catholic churches in Novi:

- Holy Family Church - The congregation opened in September 1974. People initially used Orchard Hills School as a worship site. The current name of the parish was established on November 12 of that year, and the permanent building opened on November 5, 1977.
- Saint James Church - Opened in 1989 and occupied its current facility in fall 1993. The Parish/Family Life Center opened in 2006.

St. William Catholic Church in Walled Lake includes a portion of Novi in its service area.

Sri Venkateswara Temple and Cultural Center (SVTCC) is an area Hindu temple.

== Notable people ==
Novi is home to six Swedish Detroit Red Wings. Mike Babcock, the former coach of the team, called Novi "Little Sweden" due to the concentration of Swedish Red Wings players.

- Tristan Brown (born 2007), soccer player
- Jessica Chobot (born 1977), on-camera host of IGN Strategize, Weekly Wood, and Nerdist News
- Madison Chock (born 1992), ice dancer, 2014 Olympian, 2013 and 2014 U.S. silver medalist, and 2009 World Junior Champion
- Bryan Dechart (born 1987), actor and Twitch streamer
- Craig DeRoche (born 1970), former speaker of the House, State of Michigan
- Jonathan Ericsson (born 1984), defenseman, Detroit Red Wings
- Johan Franzén (born 1979), center, Detroit Red Wings
- Dustin Gazley (born 1988), winger, Hershey Bears 2026 Olympian
- Dr. Sanjay Gupta (born 1969), chief medical correspondent for CNN, graduate of Novi High School
- Ernie Harwell (1918–2010), MLB radio announcer
- Tomas Holmström (born 1973), winger, Detroit Red Wings
- Jumpsteady (born 1970), rapper signed to Psychopathic Records, born Robert Bruce
- Niklas Kronwall (born 1981), defenseman, Detroit Red Wings
- Matīss Kivlenieks (1996–2021), goalie, played for the Columbus Blue Jackets
- Nicklas Lidström (born 1970), captain, Detroit Red Wings, a Novi street is named in his honor
- Andreas Lilja (born 1975), defenseman, Philadelphia Flyers
- Bryan Rust (born 1992), winger, Pittsburgh Penguins
- Emily Samuelson (born 1990), ice dancer, 2010 Olympian, 2009 U.S. silver medalist, and 2008 World Junior Champion
- Paul Whelan (born 1970), American marine
- Cody White (born 1998), wide receiver, Seattle Seahawks
- Damien Woody (born 1977), guard, New York Jets

== Sister cities ==
- Owani, Japan
