= Novi High School =

High school in Michigan, United States

Location
- 24062 Taft Road; Novi, Michigan 48375; United States; 42°27′50″N 83°29′24″W

Information
- School type: Public high school
- Motto: A Commitment to Excellence
- Established: 1966
- School district: Novi Community School District
- Principal: Nicole Carter
- Teaching staff: 122.41 (FTE)
- Grades: 9-12
- Enrollment: 2,094 (2023-2024)
- Student to teacher ratio: 17.11
- Campus size: 500,000 sq. ft.
- Campus type: Suburb
- Colors: Green and white
- Mascot: Wildcats
- Website: hs.novi.k12.mi.us
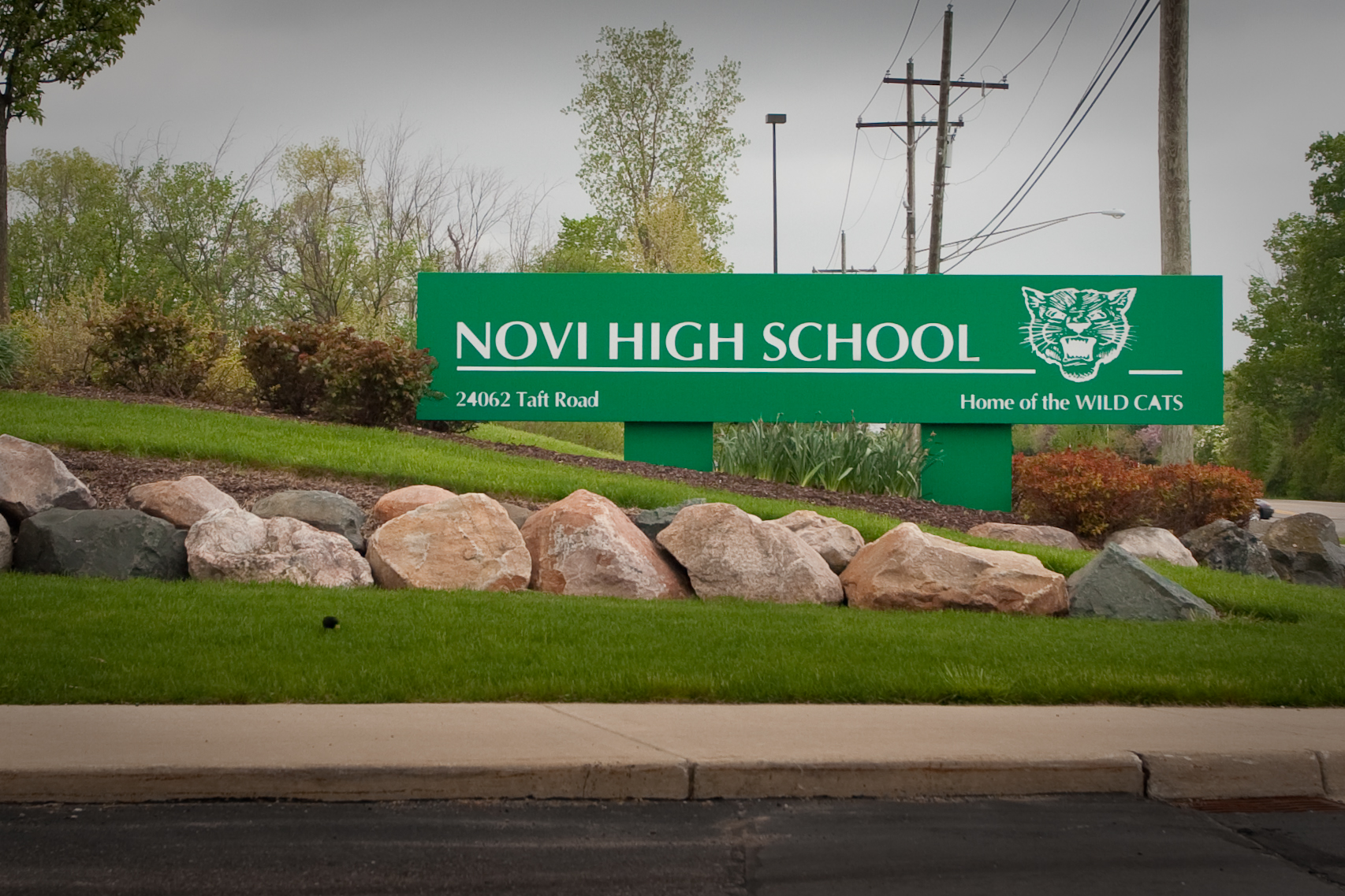

Student assessments
- 2021–22 school year Change vs. prior year

M-STEP 11th grade proficiency rates (Science / Social Studies)
- Advanced %: 20.0 / 15.2
- Proficient %: 25.9 / 30.1
- PR. Proficient %: 14.1 / 37.6
- Not Proficient %: 40.0 / 17.1

Average test scores
- SAT Total: 1166.3 (▼ −37.8)

Novi High School (commonly Novi or NHS) is a public high school in Novi (in Greater Detroit), Michigan, United States, serving students in grades 9–12. It is operated by Novi Community School District and was awarded Blue Ribbon School status in 1986–87 and 1999–00. Novi High School currently enrolls 2,020 students and has a 200-member faculty.

In addition to its primary purpose, Novi High School also houses adult education and various community recreational events, such as open swim in the swimming pool and basketball games in the gym and fieldhouse.

== History ==
Novi High School was established in 1966 and graduated its first class in 1969. Prior to 1966, high school students from the Novi district attended Northville schools. The high school started out in a rural community that saw a tremendous amount of growth between the late 1960s to the early 2000s, and subsequently, the growth of the school. The large influx of students from the 1980s to today led to several renovations and expansions of the high school.

The first high school was built in 1964, in the current Novi Meadows school at Taft and 11 Mile Roads. This building was known as Novi Junior High School from 1964 until 1968 and opened to students in the fall of 1966. Explosive growth began in Novi during the 1970s and the district quickly outgrew the old high school, forcing the district to build the current high school which opened in the fall of 1977. The current school was built on a portion of the Fuerst family farm.

The first renovation of the high school occurred from 1993 to 1996, boosting the building capacity by 40% and adding a telecommunications system, science labs, and a fine arts complex.

In 2001 a $75.6-million bond proposal passed for a second high school. A $37-million expansion and renovation that followed included an expansion of the cafeteria; a renovation of the auditorium with a new sound system, new seating, and new carpeting; and a new fine arts wing with a choir room, a black box theater, and a dance studio.

== Notable alumni ==
- Sanjay Gupta, brain surgeon, former presidential medical advisor and chief medical correspondent for CNN
- Kameron Hankerson (class of 2016), basketball player for the Long Island Nets
- Jennifer White Holland (born 1988), member of the Maryland House of Delegates
- Mitch Maier (class of 2000), baseball player for MLB's Kansas City Royals
- Michelle Rzepka (class of 2001), Olympic bobsledder.
- Emily Samuelson, Olympic ice dancing international medalist, 2008 junior world champion
- Yang Liu (class of 2009), CEO of End Game Interactive (video game company), 2021 Forbes 30 under 30 Games
- Madison Chock, 2015, 2020 national champion in ice dancing, 2014 Olympian
- Bryan Dechart, American actor and voice actor
- Leah Jeffries, American actor of Annabeth Chase in Percy Jackson
- Hikaru Kudo (Class of 2018), Outstanding Technical Team Studio Sports Emmy Winner, 44th Sports Emmy Awards
- Mattias Samuelsson (Class of 2018), hockey player for the NHL's Buffalo Sabres
- Alex Vlasic (Class of 2019), hockey player for the NHL's Chicago Blackhawks
