= Spook Bridge =

- Coordinates: 30°47′23″N 83°27′06″W
- Crosses: Withlacoochee River

Characteristics
- Design: Spandrel arch
- Traversable?: No

History
- Built: c. 1920

Spook Bridge, located on the county line between Brooks County and Lowndes County in the U.S. state of Georgia, is an abandoned open spandrel arch bridge crossing the Withlacoochee River on a closed section of Old Quitman Highway (also known as Blue Springs Road, formerly U.S. Route 84). It is considered Lowndes County's most famous relic and is decaying, becoming a dangerous site, due to its abandonment. For decades, it has served as the center of urban legends and small town curiosity in the nearby cities of Quitman and Valdosta. The bridge has developed a reputation for being a popular "hangout" for teenagers and is rumored to be haunted due to its isolated and overgrown environment.

== History ==
According to Charles Arnold, electrical superintendent for Quitman, the bridge was built circa 1920; however, its actual date of completion is unknown. The land near the bridge was owned by the Walter Cunningham family, and a resort called Blue Springs was located across the bridge near a train stop on the Brooks County side. Blue Springs resort attracted tourists from around the state of Georgia and included Blue Hole, a natural spring located near the bridge, and cabins for the tourists to stay in. According to Larry Cunningham, nephew of the late land owner Walter Cunningham, in the mid-1940s a gas truck crashed into the bridge's railing on the Brooks County side, tearing between 50 and 100 feet of railing. The railing was never repaired. According to Cunningham, at least two drownings occurred at Blue Hole prior to 1970.

In the late 1940s, a flood washed out and eventually destroyed the road on either side of the bridge, making the road unsafe for vehicle traffic. A new bridge in conjunction with US 84 opened in 1950, dramatically reducing the amount of traffic on the bridge, and around 1970, Blue Hole dried up, bringing the local tourism to a halt. According to Cunningham, satanic graffiti, such as pentagrams, began appearing in 1974 and 1975, and because of the graffiti locals gave it the name "Spook Bridge".

== Legends and rumors ==
Some of the most common tales associated with the bridge involve a dilapidated house that stands nearby, which as local folklore claims, once housed a couple, and the husband who resided there killed his wife before committing suicide. A different version of the story states that the couple was walking on the bridge when the husband shoved his wife off of the bridge and into the water, and the wife haunts the bridge, trying to climb onto the bridge from the river below. Another legend states that a high school couple was driving on the bridge when their car ran through the railings and off of the bridge, sweeping them into the river. It was rumored that if one drives onto the bridge, one can hear screaming and feel the vibrations of someone beating on the hood of the vehicle. It has also been rumored that a school bus full of children was driven off of one side of the bridge.

== Spook Bridge in its current state ==
The destroyed section of the road on Old Quitman Hwy has been blocked off on both the Lowndes County and Brooks County entrances. The road is torn apart, and the asphalt has been ripped, cracked, and scorched by fires. The roadway and railings are covered with graffiti, and the cracks in the concrete are lined with broken glass. When flooding occurs, sections of the bridge sometimes become submerged under the flood water.

Brooks County sheriffs have expressed a great deal of concern for the danger of the bridge and often patrol the abandoned roadway, making several arrests for trespassing. According to Brooks County sheriff, Richard A. Chafin, a murder occurred on the bridge and was believed to be a "drug deal gone bad". Chafin has stated that the bridge is dangerous and should be torn down, and some citizens of Valdosta are also supportive of the bridge's demolition.

== In popular media ==
A feature film was produced in 2016 featuring stories dating back from the 1870s, and was shot in various Brooks County locations including abandoned bridge itself. The movie released October 25, 2017.
