= Withlacoochee River (Suwannee River tributary) =

River in the United States of America

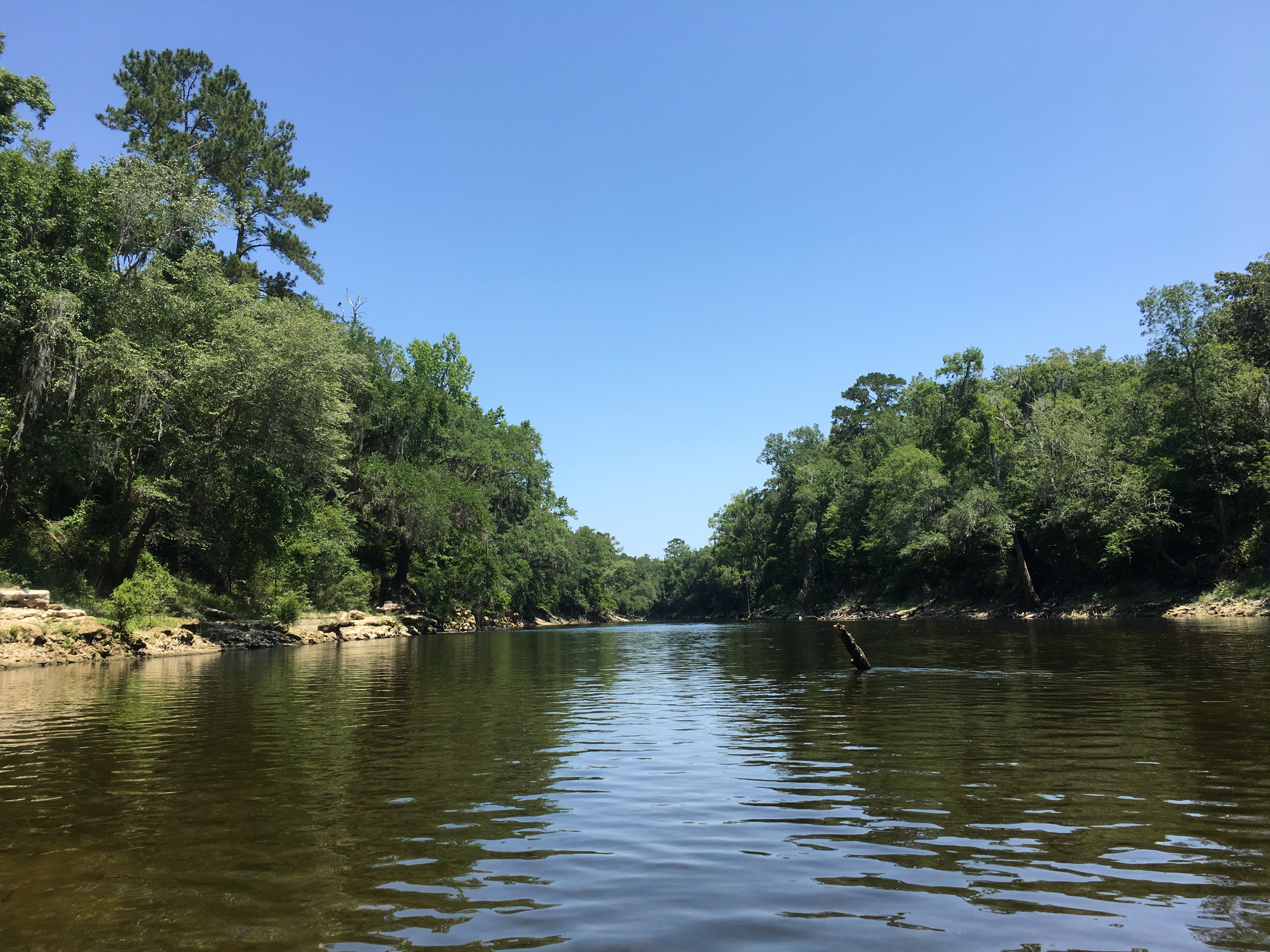
Withlacoochee River near the confluence with the Suwannee River

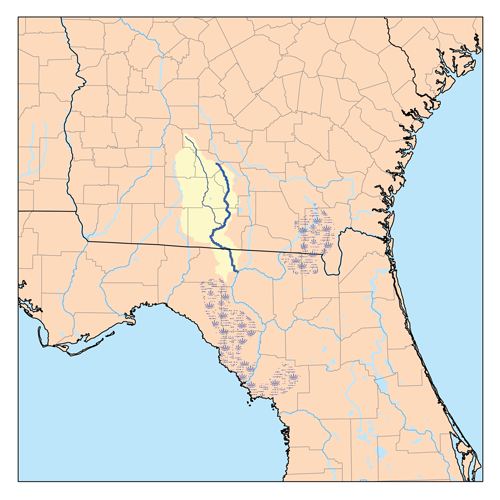

The Withlacoochee River originates in Georgia, northwest of Nashville, Georgia. It flows south through Berrien County where it joins the New River and forms part of the boundary between Berrien and Cook counties. It then flows south into Lowndes County, Georgia. At Troupville, Georgia the Little River joins the Withlacoochee River flows continues to flow south and forms part of the boundary between Lowndes and Brooks counties in Georgia. The river then flows into Florida for 1.34 miles before returning into Georgia for an additional 2.44 miles. It then returns to Florida, forming the northeast boundary of Madison County, Florida and the western boundary of Hamilton County, Florida and eventually merges with the Suwannee at Suwannee River State Park west of Live Oak. The river is 115 miles (185 km) long.

A river in central Florida is also named the Withlacoochee.

== Etymology ==
The Withlacoochee River received its name from the indigenous Muscogee and Seminole people. It comes from the compound Creek word ue-rakkuce [IPA: wiɬakːut͡ʃi], from ue "water", rakko "big", and -uce "small", with the rough translation "little river." English speakers then changed the Muskogee voiceless lateral spelled r to "thl".

== Crossings ==
Crossing	River Miles	Carries	Image	Location	ID number	Coordinates
=== Georgia ===
SP4 Derrell Danforth Bridge	~115	SR 354		Lenox, Georgia to Alapaha, Georgia		31.322594°N 83.297435°W
Oak Ford Bridge	~106	SR 125		Tifton, Georgia to Nashville, Georgia		31.215092°N 83.269252°W
		Georgia and Florida Railroad (Abandoned 1967); Line was formerly known as the Nashville and Sparks Railroad				31.205501°N 83.272724°W
POW Fred L. Belcher Bridge	~105	SR 76		Adel, Georgia to Nashville, Georgia		31.197289°N 83.271790°W
Shellie W. Parrish Memorial Bridge aka Williams Bridge	97.65	SR 37		Adel, Georgia to Ray City, Georgia		31.120233°N 83.321272°W
B Williams Bridge		Old Lois Road (Closed)				31.132777°N 83.312516°W
Futchs Bridge/Ferry	95.2	Coffee Road				31.096088°N 83.316711°W
Hagan Bridge	84.7	SR 122		Hahira, Georgia to Lakeland, Georgia		31.013867°N 83.301798°W
Tyler Bridge	79.8	Franklinville Road (Closed)				30.981372°N 83.267727°W
Skipper Bridge		Reed Road (Defunct)				30.957000°N 83.269800°W
New Skipper Bridge	76.3	Skipper Bridge Road				30.949038°N 83.271902°W
Staten Road Bridge	74.3	Staten Road				30.932936°N 83.289006°W
Fender Bridge		Staten Road (Defunct since before 1990s)				30.933004°N 83.289189°W
Double Bridges	69.1	US 41; SR 7		Valdosta, Georgia		30.892708°N 83.318815°W
		Norfolk Southern Railway; Line formerly known as Georgia Southern and Florida Railway		Valdosta, Georgia		30.863285°N 83.321587°W
	63.5	Interstate 75		Troupville, Georgia		30.855028°N 83.334319°W
	62.6	SR 133		Troupville, Georgia		30.849994°N 83.339580°W
		Valdosta, Moultrie and Western Railroad (Closed 1923, now defunct)				30.841114°N 83.353470°W
	51.8	US 84/221; SR 38		Ousley, Georgia to Quitman, Georgia		30.793568°N 83.453476°W
Spook Bridge	51.7	Old Quitman Highway (Closed)		Blue Springs, Georgia		30.789828°N 83.451651°W
	51.7	CSX Transportation; Line was formerly known as the Atlantic and Gulf Railroad				30.792882°N 83.453391°W
Spains Bridge/Ferry		Historically Spains Ferry Road (Defunct)		Spains Ferry		30.749137°N 83.482455°W
Knights Bridge/Ferry		Historically Knights Ferry Road (Defunct)		Knights Ferry		30.711146°N 83.454755°W
Rocky Ford Bridge	36.7	Rocky Ford Road/Clyattville-Nankin Road		Rocky Ford		30.674944°N 83.394416°W
=== Georgia – Florida ===
	31.1	Valdosta Railway (Closed 1973)				30.636634°N 83.350468°W
=== Georgia ===
Horns Ferry Bridge	27.8	SR 31 SR 145		Clyattville, Georgia to Pinetta, Florida		30.635379°N 83.311598°W
Old Horns Ferry Bridge	27.7	(Built 1895, closed 1940, defunct)		Clyattville, Georgia to Pinetta, Florida		30.635298°N 83.309595°W
=== Florida ===
	22.4	SR 150		Bellville, Florida		30.596707°N 83.259861°W
	22.3	(Defunct)		Bellville, Florida		30.595830°N 83.259471°W
		(Defunct)		Madison Blue Spring State Park		30.482897°N 83.243676°W
	12.0	SR 6		Madison Blue Spring State Park	320016	30.482288°N 83.243448°W
West Bridge	2.3	SR 141				30.410215°N 83.179994°W
