= Dasher, Georgia =

- Town
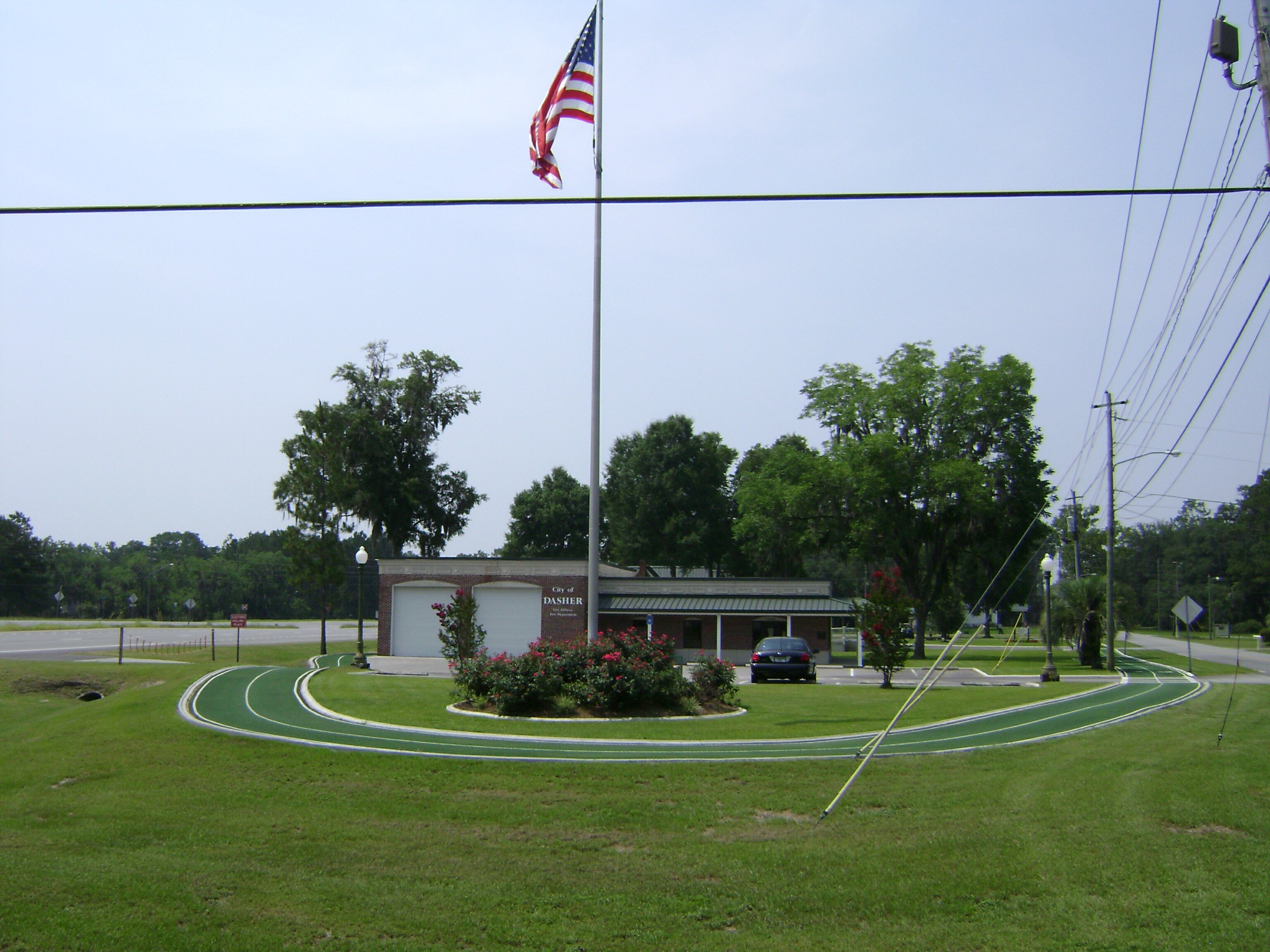
- Dasher City Hall and Fire Department

- Location in Lowndes County and the state of Georgia
- Coordinates: 30°44′43″N 83°13′23″W
- Country: United States
- State: Georgia
- County: Lowndes
- Settled: 1889
- Incorporated: 1968

Area
  - Total: 4.96 sq mi (12.85 km^{2})
  - Land: 4.60 sq mi (11.91 km^{2})
  - Water: 0.37 sq mi (0.95 km^{2})
- Elevation: 180 ft (55 m)

Population (2020)
  - Total: 890
  - Density: 193.6/sq mi (74.75/km^{2})
- Time zone: UTC-5 (Eastern (EST))
  - Summer (DST): UTC-4 (EDT)
- ZIP code: 31601
- Area code: 229
- FIPS code: 13-21744
- GNIS feature ID: 0313320
- Website: www.dasherga.gov

Dasher is a town in Lowndes County, Georgia, United States. The population was 890 in 2020.

== History ==
Dasher was established as a station on the route of the newly completed Georgia Southern and Florida Railway in 1889 at the residence of V. F. Dasher. The Georgia General Assembly incorporated Dasher in 1968.

== Geography ==
Dasher is located in southeastern Lowndes County at 30°44′43″N 83°13′23″W (30.745391, -83.222919). U.S. Route 41 passes through the town, leading northwest 7 miles (11 km) to Valdosta, the county seat, and southeast 6 miles (10 km) to Lake Park.

According to the United States Census Bureau, the town has a total area of 5.0 square miles (12.9 km^{2}), of which 4.6 square miles (11.8 km^{2}) are land and 0.42 square miles (1.1 km^{2}), or 8.44%, are water.

== Demographics ==
Historical population
Census	Pop.	Note	%±
2000	834		—
2010	912		9.4%
2020	890		−2.4%
U.S. Decennial Census; 1850-1870 1870-1880; 1890-1910 1920-1930; 1940 1950 1960; 1970 1980 1990; 2000 2010

In 2000, there were 834 people, 298 households, and 230 families residing in the town; in 2010, its population was 912. By the 2020 census, its population was 890.

== Education ==
Residents are in the Lowndes County School District. Lowndes High School is the zoned comprehensive high school.
