= Lake Park, Georgia =

- City
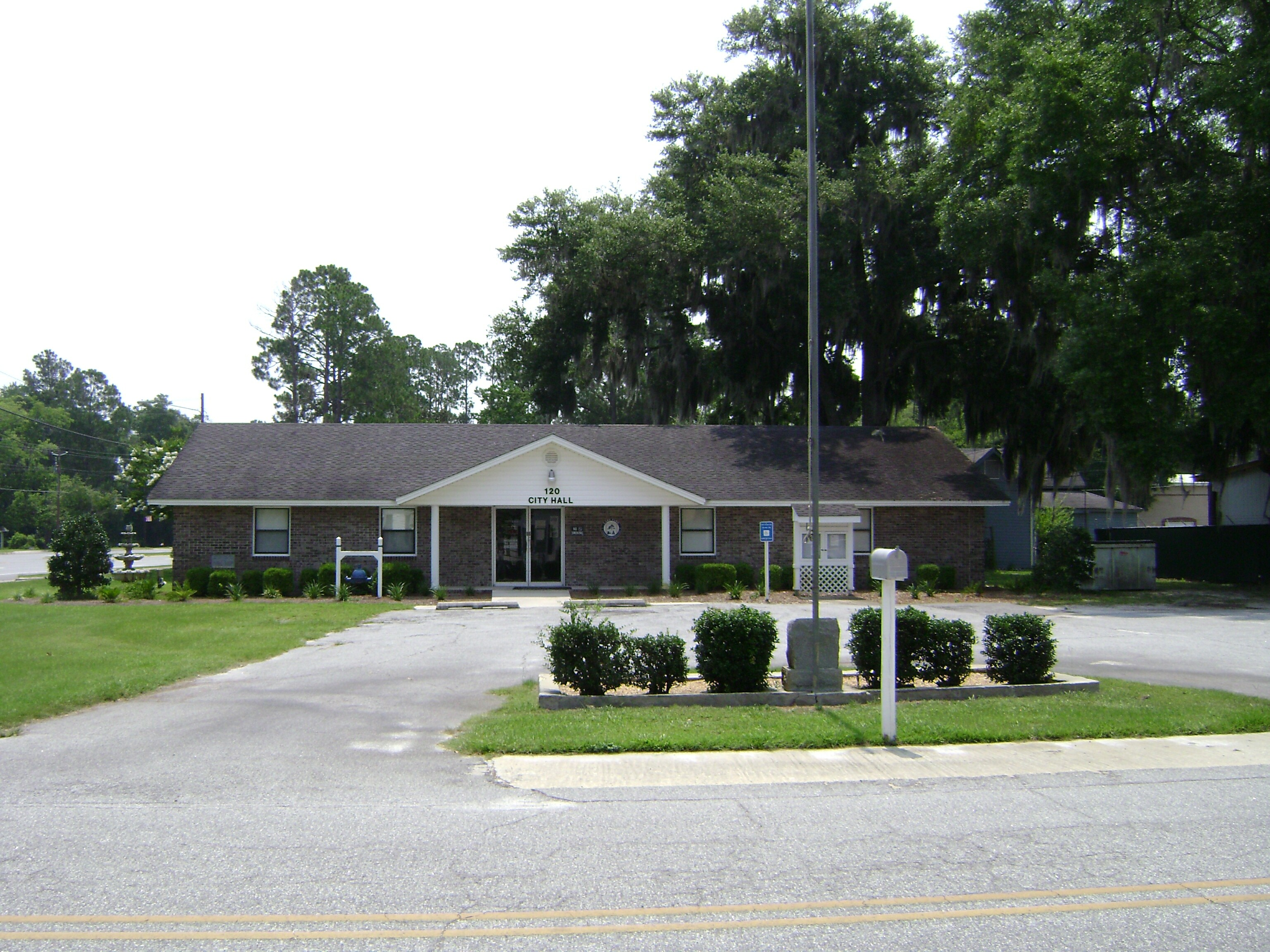
- Lake Park City Hall

- Flag Seal

- Location in Lowndes County and the state of Georgia
- Coordinates: 30°41′5″N 83°11′16″W
- Country: United States
- State: Georgia
- County: Lowndes
- Settled: 1889
- Incorporated: 29 December 1890

Government
  - Mayor: Jena Sandlin

Area
  - Total: 1.43 sq mi (3.70 km^{2})
  - Land: 1.41 sq mi (3.64 km^{2})
  - Water: 0.019 sq mi (0.05 km^{2})
- Elevation: 157 ft (48 m)

Population (2020)
  - Total: 932
  - Density: 662.4/sq mi (255.74/km^{2})
- Time zone: UTC-5 (Eastern (EST))
  - Summer (DST): UTC-4 (EDT)
- ZIP code: 31636
- Area code: 229
- FIPS code: 13-44704
- GNIS feature ID: 0332166
- Website: cityoflakeparkga.com

Lake Park is a city in Lowndes County, Georgia, United States. The population was 932 in 2020, up from 733 in 2010.

== History ==
Lake Park was laid out in 1889 along the route of the newly completed Georgia Southern and Florida Railway. It was originally named Lawrence after its founder, Lawrence A. Wisenbaker. However, the name Lawrenceville was rejected due to the existence of another town with the same name in Georgia. Subsequently, in April 1890, it was renamed Lake Park in reference to the numerous lakes surrounding the original town site. The Georgia General Assembly officially incorporated Lake Park in December 1890.

== Geography ==
Lake Park is located in southeastern Lowndes County at 30°41′5″N 83°11′16″W (30.684704, -83.187639). It is bordered to the northwest by the unincorporated community of Twin Lakes.

U.S. Route 41 passes through the center of town as Marion Avenue. It leads northwest 13 miles (21 km) to Valdosta, the county seat, and southeast 7 miles (11 km) to Jennings, Florida. Georgia State Route 376 leads east 10 miles (16 km) to Statenville and west 8 miles (13 km) to Clyattville. Interstate 75 passes west and south of Lake Park, with access from Exits 2 (Belville Road) and 5 (State Route 376). I-75 leads north past Valdosta 57 miles (92 km) to Tifton and southeast 47 miles (76 km) to Lake City, Florida.

According to the United States Census Bureau, Lake Park has a total area of 1.4 square miles (3.7 km^{2}), of which 0.019 square miles (0.05 km^{2}), or 1.48%, are water. There are several natural lakes west and north of the city, including two (Ocean Pond and Long Pond) within the city limits.

== Demographics ==
Historical population
Census	Pop.	Note	%±
1900	319		—
1910	285		−10.7%
1920	310		8.8%
1930	424		36.8%
1940	387		−8.7%
1950	334		−13.7%
1960	338		1.2%
1970	361		6.8%
1980	439		21.6%
1990	500		13.9%
2000	549		9.8%
2010	733		33.5%
2020	932		27.1%
2023 (est.)	1,485	▲	59.3%
U.S. Decennial Census; 1850-1870 1870-1880; 1890-1910 1920-1930; 1940 1950 1960; 1970 1980 1990; 2000 2010

In 2000, there were 549 people, 224 households, and 140 families residing in the city. In 2020, its population grew to 932.

== Education ==
The Lowndes County School District, the area school district, operates Lake Park Elementary School. High school students attend Lowndes High School.

South Georgia Regional Library operates the Edith Garlow Johnston Lakes Library in Lake Park. Country Johnson, a property developer in the area, donated the land for the library. It was named after his wife, Edith Garlow Johnson, and opened on March 4, 1990.

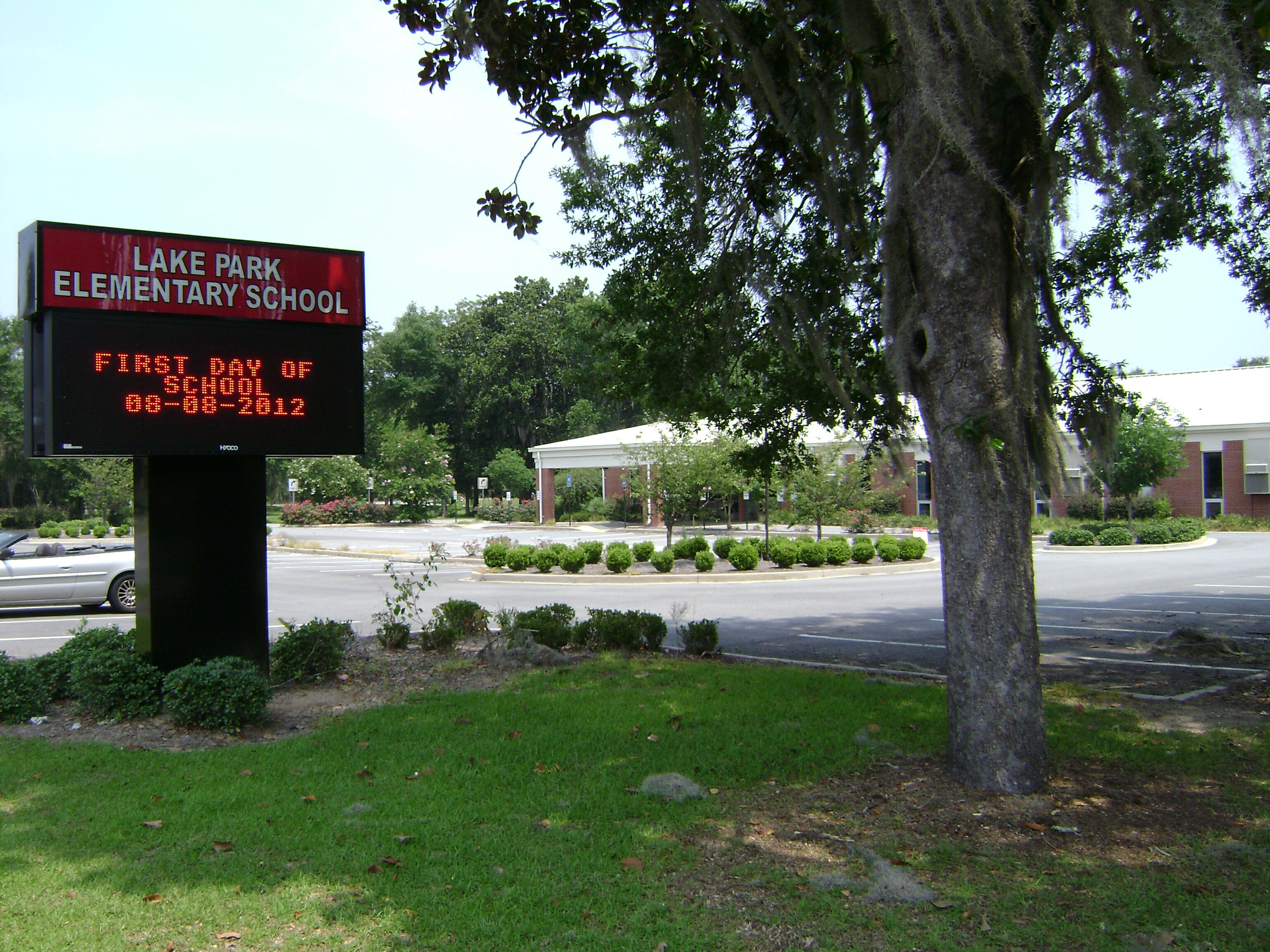
Lake Park Elementary School

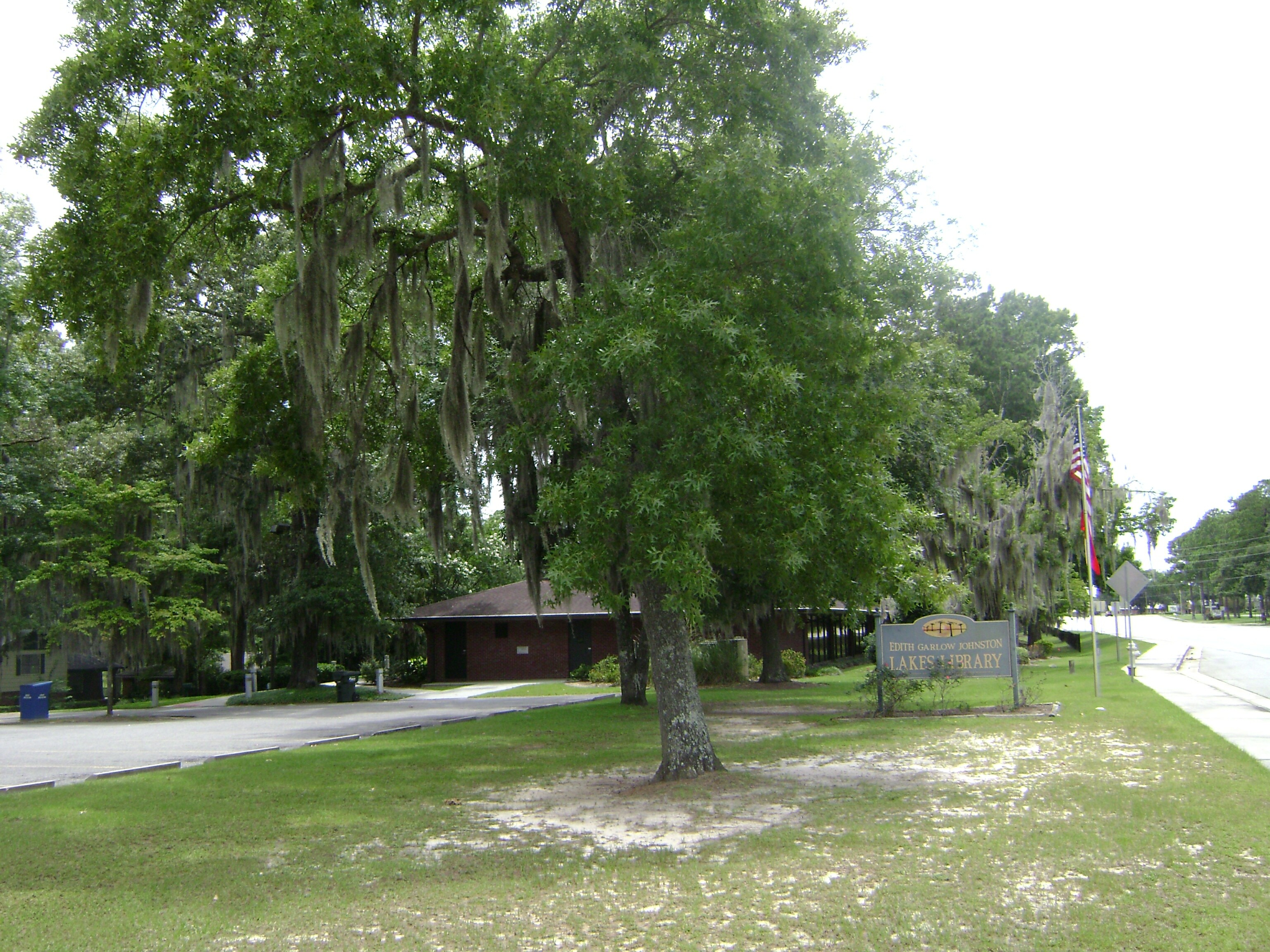
Edith Garlow Johnston Lakes Library
