= Indianola =

Indianola may refer to:

== Places in the United States ==
- Indianola, California
- Indianola, Florida
- Indianola, Georgia
- Indianola, Illinois
- Indianola, Iowa
- Indianola, Kansas, a former settlement in Kansas
- Indianola, Mississippi
- Indianola, Nebraska
- Indianola, Delaware County, Oklahoma
- Indianola, Pittsburg County, Oklahoma
- Indianola, Pennsylvania
- Indianola, Texas, a ghost town
- Indianola, Utah
- Indianola, Washington

== Other ==
- Indianola (album), a 2007 album by Steve Azar
- USS Indianola, an iron-clad ship of the American Civil War
