= Lowndes High School =

Public high school in Valdosta, Georgia, United States

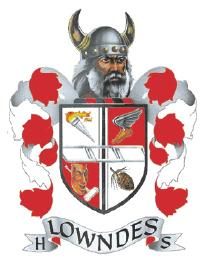

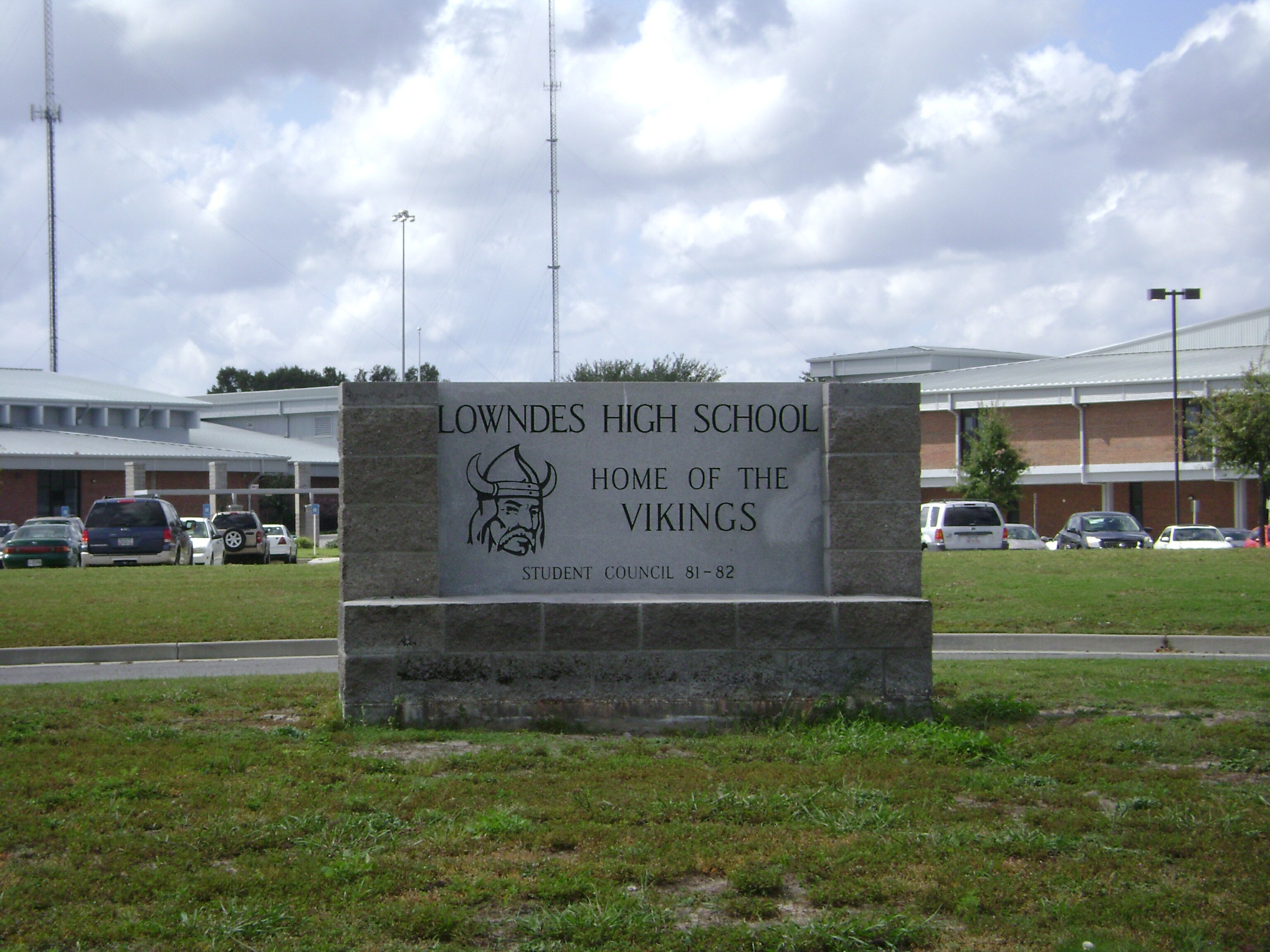

Location
- 1606 Norman Drive; Valdosta, Georgia 31601; United States; 30°50′15″N 83°19′35″W

Information
- School type: Public
- Motto: "Excellence Every Day"
- Established: 1966
- School board: Lowndes County Board of Education
- School district: Lowndes County School District
- School number: 1606 Norman Drive, Valdosta, Georgia 31601
- Principal: Krista Pearson
- Teaching staff: 185.70 (on an FTE basis)
- Grades: 9–12
- Enrollment: 3,152 (2024–2025)
- Student to teacher ratio: 176.97
- Colors: (Official) Crimson and white (Alternate) Maroon and gray
- Fight song: LHS Fight song (an adaptation of Old Mountain Dew)
- Sports: Football, basketball, soccer, track & field
- Mascot: Viking
- Nickname: Plowboys
- Team name: Vikings
- Rival: Valdosta High School
- Accreditation: Southern Association of Colleges and Schools
- Publication: The Hugin
- Newspaper: The Saga
- Yearbook: The Munin
- Website: lhs.lowndes.k12.ga.us

Lowndes High School is a public high school in Valdosta, Georgia, United States. The school is part of the Lowndes school system, which serves Lowndes County except for the city of Valdosta. The district includes the following municipalities: Dasher, Hahira, Lake Park, and Remerton, as well as the following census-designated places: Bemiss, Clyattville, Moody AFB, and Naylor.

== History ==
In 1957, voters in Lowndes County approved an $800,000 bond issue and the board got assistance from the State of Georgia for the construction of a new high school.

Lowndes County High School opened in 1959 in the southern portion of the county below Valdosta, serving a totally white enrollment of 671 students. In 1961 students from the local black high schools, Lowndes County Training School and Webb-Miller, were integrated into Westside High School.

In 1966 LCHS and Hahira High School consolidated to form the new Lowndes High School (LHS) and began with an enrollment of 805. The new school was relocated to its present facility on Norman Drive near I-75 on the western side of Lowndes County. The former facility became Lowndes Middle School.

In 1969, when the county integrated their schools, the former black school, Westside High, was also combined into Lowndes. LHS became a comprehensive high school in 1972 and was classified as a Georgia School of Excellence in 1980.

LHS is now one of the largest high schools in the state of Georgia, with a student enrollment of over 3000 students and 170 faculty members.

=== Expansion ===
The facility built in 1966 has undergone multiple expansions to accommodate continued growth in student population.

In 2001, 17 classrooms were added to the freshman building. In January 2002, a $5 million cafetorium was constructed which significantly expanded seating capacity over the former space. The new structure also featured updated cooking and disposal technology and a full multi-purpose stage.

In 2007, a new $8 million 49,549-square-foot (4,603.3 m^{2}) gymnasium was completed. The former gym, built in 1966, seated approximately 1,600, while the new facility seats approximately 3,056. The building also contains five classrooms, locker rooms, and coaches' offices. The project was funded through SPLOST II. The gym was designed by Manley Spangler Smith Architects.

In 2007 a new main road entrance to the school was opened on Norman Drive, along with a new front parking lot and office entrance. The old entrance on St. Augustine Road was closed due to congestion but is still used for large events. JCI Construction of Moultrie built the gym and Rountree Construction of Valdosta built the new entrance, new parking lot, and portico.

At the start of the 2018–2019 school year, portions of the school, including most of the original school buildings that opened in 1966, were demolished to make way for the new building that started construction later that summer. The new building was completed and occupied with students and teachers by early 2022. The new additions to the campus includes a three-story building that includes a large performing arts center, media center, and state-of-the-art technology labs.

=== Pride flag incident ===
On September 3, 2021, a video went viral on multiple social media platforms of a student being assaulted by another student. The video features the student being dragged across the floor of the cafeteria by a pride flag wrapped around their shoulders. The perpetrating student was charged with disorderly conduct, simple battery, and disruption of a public facility.

== Death of Kendrick Johnson ==
In January 2013, three-sport athlete Kendrick Johnson was found deceased at the school in a rolled up wrestling mat. After a preliminary investigation and autopsy concluded that Johnson's death was accidental, his family had a private pathologist conduct a second autopsy which concluded that he died from blunt force trauma. In October 2013, the U.S. Attorney for the Middle District of Georgia announced that his office would open a formal review into Johnson's death. In June 2016, the Department of Justice announced that it would not be filing any criminal charges related to Johnson's death. Subsequently, Johnson's family filed a $100 million civil lawsuit against 38 individuals. That lawsuit was later withdrawn, and a judge ordered the Johnsons and their attorney to pay legal fees to the defendants.

== National Principal of the Year ==
On August 26, 2010, Lowndes High Principal Wes Taylor was named the 2011 MetLife/NASSP National High School Principal of the Year. In April, Taylor was named the 2011 Principal of the Year by the Georgia Association of Secondary School Principals and in July was named one of six finalists for the national honor. Taylor received a $5,000 grant to use for either professional development or school improvement projects. The event featured guests such as State Representative Amy Carter, Speaker of the Georgia House of Representatives David Ralston, and state superintendent of schools Brad Bryant.

== Sports ==
=== Football ===
With the arrival of head coach Randy McPherson in 2002, the Lowndes High football program has undergone tremendous growth. The Lowndes High School Vikings were ranked by ESPN at #2 in the United States on August 18, 2008. The team has been the Georgia State 5A Champion in 1980, 1999, 2004, 2005, and 2007. They were undefeated in 2004 for a perfect 15–0.

In the summer of 2008, Valdosta was featured on ESPN as a candidate for Titletown USA. The month-long segment started in the spring of 2008 and continued through July. Fans nominated towns and cities across the country based on their championship pedigree. A panel reviewed the nominees and fan voting in May determined the 20 finalists. SportsCenter visited each city in July, and fan voting July 23–27 determined the winner. On July 28, 2008, Valdosta was named Titletown, United States by ESPN. The history of athletic accomplishments at Lowndes was a factor in Valdosta achieving the title.

==== Martin Stadium ====
The home field of the Lowndes football team is Martin Stadium, named to honor former Lowndes County Schools superintendent A.B. "Sonny" Martin. He served 20 years (1960–1980) as the superintendent of the Lowndes County School System. He previously served as a teacher, coach, and principal of Hahira High School for 10 years. The stadium, nicknamed "The Concrete Palace," was built in 1966 and has been expanded over the years to hold 12,365 fans.

=== Basketball ===
The girls' basketball team at Lowndes has won four National Championships (1977, 1978, 1979, 1980), and four State Championships.

=== Baseball ===
Lowndes won the 1981 and 2000 Class AAAA, and the 2023 and 2024 Division AAAAAAA baseball State Championships.

=== Golf ===
The boys' golf team won the 2011 Class AAAAA state championship at Summit Chase Country Club in Snellville, Georgia. The state title was the school's first in golf.

=== State Titles ===
- Baseball (3) – 1981(4A), 2000(4A), 2023 (7A), 2024 (7A)
- Girls' Basketball (4) 1977(3A), 1978(3A), 1979(4A), 1980(4A)
- Football (5) – 1980(4A), 1999(4A), 2004(5A), 2005(5A), 2007(5A)
- Boys' Golf (1) – 2011 (5A)

=== Other GHSA State Titles ===
- Literary (4) – 1974(3A), 1980(4A), 2016 (6A), 2017 (7A)

== Music ==
=== Georgia Bridgemen ===
The Lowndes High marching band, The Georgia Bridgemen, are a nationally recognized musical ensemble numbering over 475 members that performs at all Lowndes varsity football games.

Over the past two decades, the Bridgemen have received national recognition from participation in parades across the country such as:

- 1991, 1994, 1996 – Brach's Christmas Parade (Chicago)
- 1998 – The Houston Texas Christmas Parade (Houston)
- 1999 – Mickey's Very Merry Christmas Parade (Disney World, Orlando)
- 2000 – The Marshall Field's Jingle Elf Parade (Chicago)
- 2001 – The National Cherry Blossom Festival Parade (Washington, D.C.)
- 2003 – The Macy's Thanksgiving Day Parade (New York City)
- 2005 – The United States Presidential Inaugural Parade for George W. Bush (Washington D.C)
- 2006 – The Tournament of Roses Parade (Pasadena), The McDonald's Thanksgiving Parade (Chicago, Illinois), and the Walt Disney World Christmas Day Parade (Disney World, Orlando, Florida)
- 2008 – The National Cherry Blossom Festival Parade (Washington D.C)
- 2010 – The 6abc IKEA Thanksgiving Day Parade (Philadelphia)
- 2012 – The McDonald's Thanksgiving Parade (Chicago, Illinois)

=== Lowndes High Jazz Ensemble ===
The jazz band at Lowndes High School performs throughout the school year at many local and state level functions. The group has recorded four CDs since 2004. Each was produced by New York-based professional musician and record producer and former Lowndes High band student J. Chris Griffin in Nashville, Tennessee. The last CD was released in 2010 and is sold locally to support the band.

The Jazz Band has performed for Georgia Governor Sonny Perdue on multiple occasions, as well as for Georgia Secretary of State Cathy Cox, State Superintendent of Schools Kathy Cox, Georgia Congressman Sanford Bishop, and US Secretary of Education Margaret Spellings.

In 2006 these musicians were invited to perform in Pasadena, California, for the "Tournament of Roses Executive Committee Luncheon" by Tournament President Libby Evans-Wright and for the 2006 parade grand marshal Supreme Court Justice Sandra Day O’Connor.

=== LHS Off-Broadway ===
LHS Off-Broadway consists of Acting Classes, a Technical Theatre program, a Drama Club, an Audition Only Acting Company, and Thespian Troupe 1359. Troupe 1359 was awarded Gold Level Status in 2018, which is the highest level of distinction within the Georgia Thespian Society.

== Notable alumni ==
- Rhett Akins, (born 1969), is a country music singer and songwriter.
- Michael Barrett, (born 1999), is a linebacker for the St. Louis Battlehawks.
- Jacurri Brown, (born 2003), is a quarterback for the Rice Owls.
- Vincent Burns, (1981–2024) was an NFL Football player for the Indianapolis Colts.
- J. D. Drew, (born 1975) is a former MLB right fielder and World Series Champion with the Boston Red Sox.
- Stephen Drew, (born 1983) is a former MLB infielder and World Series Champion with the Boston Red Sox.
- Tim Drew, (born 1978) is a former Major League Baseball pitcher with the Atlanta Braves.
- Kenneth Durden, (born 1992) is an American football cornerback for the Tucson Sugar Skulls.
- Randall Godfrey, (born 1973) is a former NFL linebacker for the Dallas Cowboys.
- Josh Harvey-Clemons, (born 1994) is a former NFL linebacker who played for the Washington Football Team.
- Kenny Moore II, (born 1995) is an NFL cornerback for the Indianapolis Colts.
- Gabe Nabers, (born 1997) is a former NFL fullback who played for the Los Angeles Chargers.
- TJ Quinn (born 2003), is an NFL linebacker for the Green Bay Packers.
- Jay Ratliff, (born 1981), is a former NFL defensive lineman for the Dallas Cowboys.
- Greg Reid, (born 1990) is a former CFL cornerback who played for the Montreal Alouettes.
- Telvin Smith, (born 1991) is a former NFL linebacker for the Jacksonville Jaguars.
- Sepp Straka, (born 1993) is an Austrian professional golfer who plays on the PGA Tour.
- Aaron Taylor, (born 1977), is a former MLB pitcher for the Seattle Mariners.
