= Troupville, Georgia =

- Unincorporated community
- Location in Georgia Location in the United States
- Coordinates: 30°50′57″N 83°20′15″W
- Country: United States
- State: Georgia
- County: Lowndes
- Time zone: UTC-5 (Eastern (EST))
  - Summer (DST): UTC-4 (EDT)

Troupville (occasionally recorded as Troupeville) is an extinct unincorporated community in Lowndes County, Georgia, United States, near Valdosta. Troupville was a riverboat landing near the confluence of the Withlacoochee River and the Little River at the uppermost navigable point. It was the third county seat of Lowndes County. Troupville was named after Governor George Troup.

Railroads were superseding riverboats across the state. After a railroad station was established at Valdosta in 1859, many Troupville residents picked up their houses and moved to the railroad. They founded Valdosta, which the following year was designated by the legislature as the county seat.

== History ==
In 1833, Lowndesville, Georgia replaced Franklinville, located east of modern Hahira, as the county seat.

In 1834, a group of citizens were appointed to select a new county seat to keep pace with settlement. In July 1836, a group of commissioners were advertising for merchants and mechanics to settle at Troupville. They believed that the Little River and Withlacoochee River could be made navigable to this point at a small expense. After the county seat was moved away from Franklinville and Lowndesville in turn, they declined.

In October 1836, advertisements were put in newspapers for proposals to build a courthouse at Troupville. The city was incorporated on 14 December 1837 by an act of the Georgia legislature and designated as the county seat (the third).

Troupville's location near the confluence of the Withlacoochee and Little Rivers, on the stage route from Thomasville to Waresboro, and along the planned route of the Brunswick and Florida Railroad, soon proved prosperous. In 1839, town lots were being sold at $3,443. A decade later they had risen to $9,162. At its peak, Troupville had three hotels, four stores, numerous shops, three churches, and professionals of various sorts. It also had a newspaper entitled the South Georgia Watchman, later called the Troupville Watchman. Located in an area of large cotton plantations, Troupville also served as a gateway town to the new state of Florida. A mile to the north of the town was a horse racetrack, popular with many men.

By the 1850s, two different companies were competing to build a railroad through south Georgia. The Brunswick and Florida Railroad had an older charter, but lacked enough financial backing. The Savannah, Albany, and Gulf Railroad Company had the financial backing, but lacked the right of way through south Georgia. By the early 1850s, the Brunswick and Florida Railroad had completed its route as far as Schlatterville. In February 1856 the Atlantic and Gulf Railroad Company received a charter to construct a line from the junction of the Savannah, Albany, and Gulf Railroad and the Brunswick and Florida Railroad and to western border of the state that was to pass through Lowndes County. A law passed at the same time required the Brunswick and Florida Railroad to forfeit its right of way through central south Georgia in exchange for financial backing from the state. Two years of disagreements and agreements between the competing companies followed. Eventually the Brunswick and Florida Railroad forfeited its right of way.

Three different routes through Lowndes County were surveyed by E.L. Heriot, chief engineer for the company: a route through northern Troupville, a line through northern Lowndes County, and a line passing through Lowndes County and crossing the Withlacoochee River at a mineral springs. The decision to go with the third route was published on June 17, 1858. Heriot reasoned that the southern route required less curvature and fewer changes in grade than the shorter route through Troupville. Days later on June 22 at 3:00 am, the Lowndes County courthouse at Troupville was set on fire by William B. Crawford. Crawford fled to South Carolina after being released on bond. On August 9, a meeting convened in the academy building in Troupville to discuss organizing a new county. They decided to take area from Lowndes County, west of the Withlacoochee River (also known as the Little River), to form a new county to be called Brooks County.

The construction of the Atlantic and Gulf Railroad through southern Lowndes County signaled the end of Troupville. Riverboats had become obsolete and establishing a town at the junction of the rail lines under construction was crucial for the livelihood of Lowndes County. Many residents physically moved their homes and businesses to Valdosta. Troupville quickly lost its charter as county seat to the newly founded Valdosta.

In early 1871, a toll bridge crossing the Little River from Troupville to Brooks County was completed. By 1874 Troupville was described by a Valdostan, as being "a deserted village or rather an old field with scarcely a vestige of the village remaining."

The town's municipal charter officially was repealed in 1995.

== See also ==
- List of county seats in Georgia (U.S. state)
