= Lowndes County School District (Georgia) =

School district in Georgia (U.S. state)

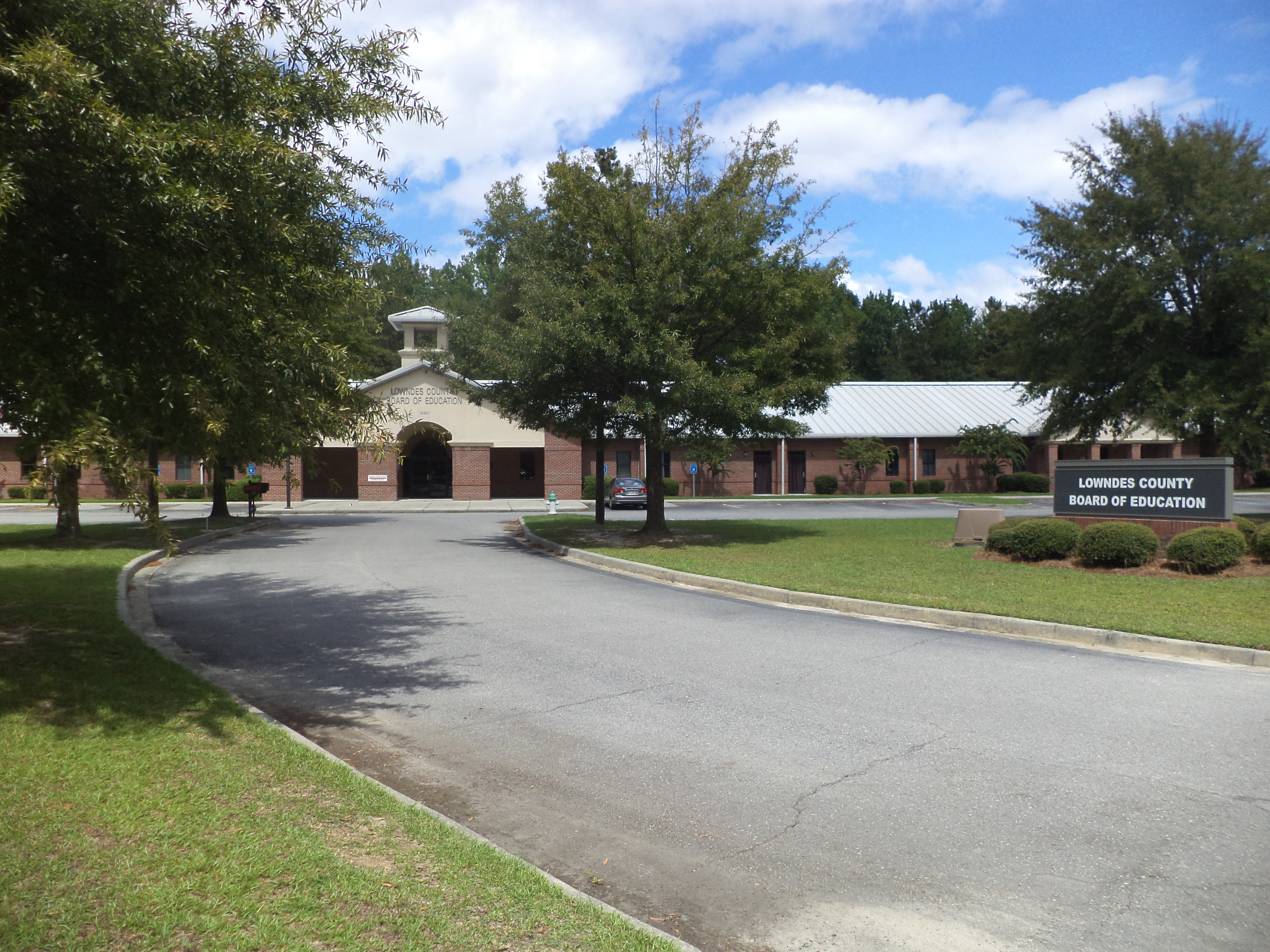
- Lowndes County Board of Education building in 2014

Address
- 1592 Norman Drive Valdosta, Georgia, 31601-3581; United States
- Coordinates: 30.834966°N 83.320821°W

District information
- Grades: Pre-kindergarten – 12
- Superintendent: Sandra Wilcher
- Accreditations: Southern Association of Colleges and Schools; Georgia Accrediting Commission

Students and staff
- Enrollment: 10,728 (2022–23)
- Faculty: 748.60 (FTE)
- Staff: 143.70 (FTE)
- Student–teacher ratio: 14.33

Other information
- Telephone: (229) 245-2250
- Fax: (229) 245-2255
- Website: lowndes.k12.ga.us

The Lowndes County School District is a public school district in Lowndes County, Georgia, United States, based in Valdosta.

The district includes areas outside of the Valdosta city limits. The district includes the following municipalities: Dasher, Hahira, Lake Park, and Remerton, as well as the following census-designated places: Bemiss, Clyattville, Moody AFB, and Naylor.

== Schools ==
The Lowndes County School District has seven elementary schools, three middle schools, and one high school.

Elementary schools

- Clyattville Elementary School
- Dewar Elementary School
- Hahira Elementary School
- Lake Park Elementary School
- Moulton-Branch Elementary School
- Pine Grove Elementary School
- Westside Elementary School (located on the grounds of the former Westside High School)

Middle schools

- Hahira Middle School
- Lowndes Alternative Middle School
- Lowndes Middle School
- Pine Grove Middle School

High schools

- Lowndes Alternative High School
- Lowndes High School
