= Ousley, Georgia =

Unincorporated community in Georgia, U.S.

Coordinates: 30°47′40″N 83°25′51″W

Ousley is an unincorporated community in Lowndes County, in the U.S. state of Georgia.

== History ==
The community was named after Joseph and William H. Ousley, pioneer citizens. A post office called Ousley was established in 1866, and remained in operation until 1954.
