= Naylor, Georgia =

- Unincorporated community Census-designated place
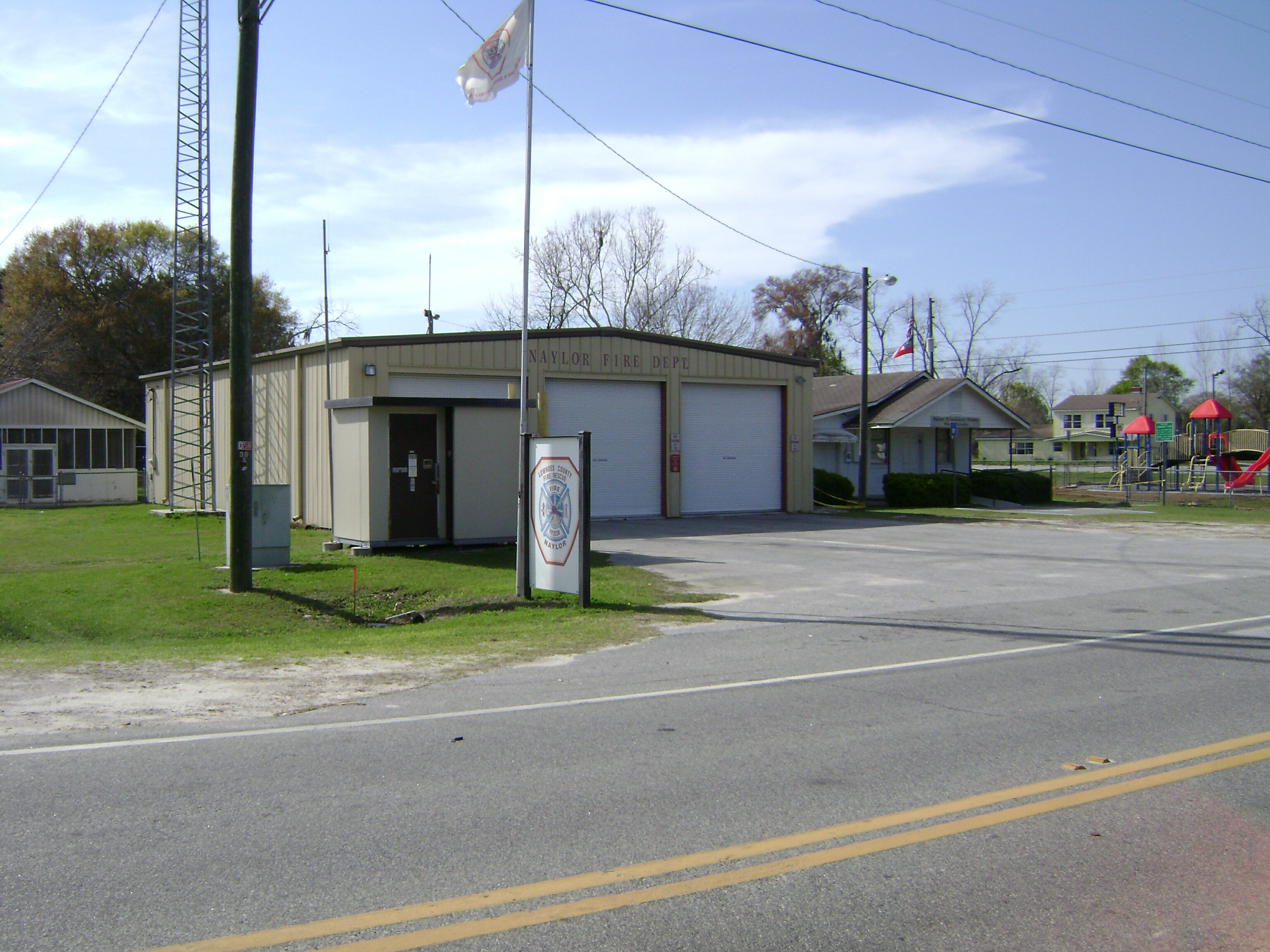
- Naylor Volunteer Fire Department with Naylor Park in background

- Location in Georgia Location in the United States
- Coordinates: 30°54′31″N 83°4′42″W
- Country: United States
- State: Georgia
- County: Lowndes

Population (2020)
  - Total: 139
- Time zone: UTC-5 (Eastern (EST))
  - Summer (DST): UTC-4 (EDT)
- ZIP codes: 31641

Naylor is an unincorporated community and census-designated place in Lowndes County, Georgia, United States. The mayor is Mike L. Daniels

The 2020 census listed a population of 139.

== History ==
The community was named after Captain Naylor, a railroad agent. The Georgia General Assembly incorporated Naylor as a town in 1906.

== Geography ==
Naylor is a circular area, one mile in diameter, located at the intersection of U.S. Route 84 and Georgia State Route 135. It is located approximately 9.5 miles east of Valdosta.

- U.S. Route 84
- Georgia State Route 135

== Demographics ==
Historical population
Census	Pop.	Note	%±
2020	139		—
U.S. Decennial Census; 2020

Naylor was first listed as a census designated place in the 2020 U.S. census.

Naylor CDP, Georgia – Racial and ethnic composition Note: the US Census treats Hispanic/Latino as an ethnic category. This table excludes Latinos from the racial categories and assigns them to a separate category. Hispanics/Latinos may be of any race.
Race / Ethnicity (NH = Non-Hispanic)	Pop 2020	% 2020
White alone (NH)	104	74.82%
Black or African American alone (NH)	19	13.67%
Native American or Alaska Native alone (NH)	0	0.00%
Asian alone (NH)	1	0.72%
Pacific Islander alone (NH)	0	0.00%
Some Other Race alone (NH)	1	0.72%
Mixed Race or Multi-Racial (NH)	3	2.16%
Hispanic or Latino (any race)	11	7.91%
Total	139	100.00%

In 2020, its population was 139.

== Education ==
Residents are in the Lowndes County School District. Lowndes High School is the zoned comprehensive high school.
