= Remerton, Georgia =

Remerton, Georgia, USA
- City
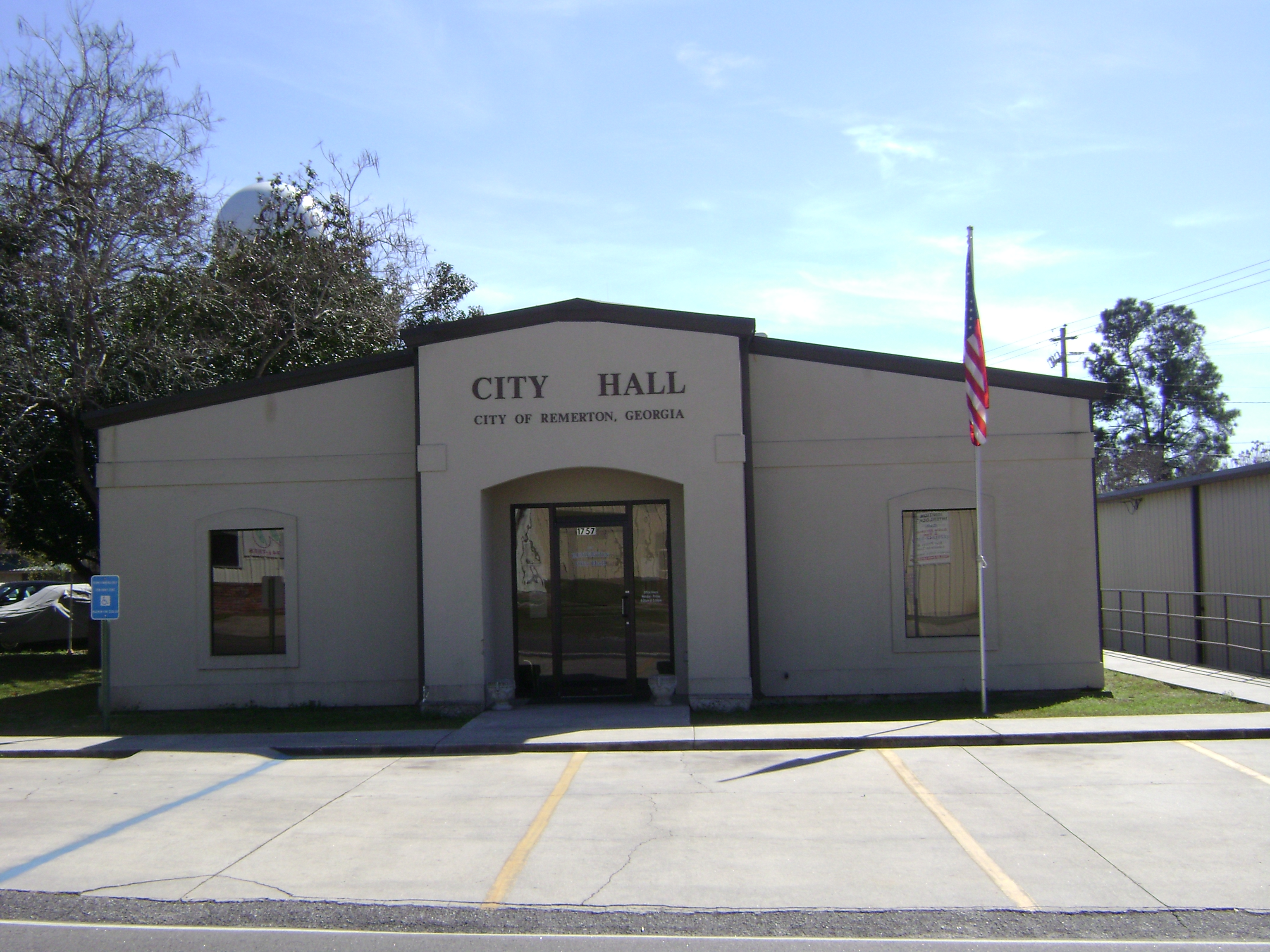
- Remerton City Hall

- Seal Logo

- Location in Lowndes County and the state of Georgia
- Coordinates: 30°50′37″N 83°18′31″W
- Country: United States
- State: Georgia
- County: Lowndes

Government
  - Mayor: Cornelius Holsendolph

Area
  - Total: 0.20 sq mi (0.53 km^{2})
  - Land: 0.20 sq mi (0.53 km^{2})
  - Water: 0 sq mi (0.00 km^{2})
- Elevation: 177 ft (54 m)

Population (2020)
  - Total: 1,334
  - Density: 6,540.3/sq mi (2,525.21/km^{2})
- Time zone: UTC-5 (EST)
  - Summer (DST): UTC-4 (EDT)
- ZIP code: 31601
- Area code: 229
- FIPS code: 13-64596
- GNIS feature ID: 0332830
- Website: cityofremerton.com

Remerton is a city in Lowndes County, Georgia, United States. The population was 1,123 at the 2010 census, and 1,334 in 2020. It was incorporated as a town in 1951, and chartered as a city under Georgia law in 2000.

Remerton is an enclave of Valdosta and is a popular place for Valdosta State University students to live.

== History ==
Remerton was founded in 1899 as a company town for workers at the Strickland Cotton Mill. It was named for banker Remer Y. Lane. In 1951 Remerton was incorporated as municipality. In January 1979, Strickland Cotton Mills closed. Two months later the mill was purchased by Wipo Inc. and the mill began to operate as Sugar Creek Textiles.

During the 1980s Remerton underwent many changes. Apartments began being built to attract students from what was then known as Valdosta State College. Also, businesses including a Piggly Wiggly were built. In 1985 the L.E. Davis family purchased the Strickland Cotton Mill building from Sugar Creek Textiles. The next year Fred Wilkinson purchased the building and used the building for his Wilkinson Textile Company.

On 1 November 2005, the Strickland Cotton Mill building was purchased by Remerton Mills, LLC. Remerton Mills, LLC is a corporation with local businessman Joseph H. Tillman Sr. as the registered agent. In 2006 Remerton Mills, LLC announced plans for renovating the Strickland Cotton Mill building into residential and commercial spaces.

In 2012 plans for the demolition of the historic Strickland Cotton Mill were put in motion by Remerton Mills, LLC despite calls from preservationists and locals to save it. Plans were announced to build a park at the site. The demolition of the mill building began in June 2013.

== Geography ==
Remerton is located at 30°50′36″N 83°18′30″W (30.843572, -83.308492).

According to the United States Census Bureau, the city has a total area of 0.2 square miles (0.52 km^{2}), all land.

== Demographics ==
Historical population
Census	Pop.	Note	%±
1960	571		—
1970	523		−8.4%
1980	443		−15.3%
1990	463		4.5%
2000	847		82.9%
2010	1,123		32.6%
2020	1,334		18.8%
U.S. Decennial Census; 1850-1870 1870-1880; 1890-1910 1920-1930; 1940 1950 1960; 1970 1980 1990; 2000 2010

=== 2020 census ===
As of the 2020 census, Remerton had a population of 1,334. The median age was 24.6 years. 24.5% of residents were under the age of 18 and 3.3% of residents were 65 years of age or older. For every 100 females there were 82.5 males, and for every 100 females age 18 and over there were 76.7 males age 18 and over.

100.0% of residents lived in urban areas, while 0.0% lived in rural areas.

There were 589 households in Remerton, of which 31.1% had children under the age of 18 living in them. Of all households, 16.3% were married-couple households, 27.0% were households with a male householder and no spouse or partner present, and 44.5% were households with a female householder and no spouse or partner present. About 31.1% of all households were made up of individuals and 2.7% had someone living alone who was 65 years of age or older.

There were 670 housing units, of which 12.1% were vacant. The homeowner vacancy rate was 26.3% and the rental vacancy rate was 9.1%.

Racial composition as of the 2020 census
Race	Number	Percent
White	410	30.7%
Black or African American	803	60.2%
American Indian and Alaska Native	5	0.4%
Asian	17	1.3%
Native Hawaiian and Other Pacific Islander	1	0.1%
Some other race	31	2.3%
Two or more races	67	5.0%
Hispanic or Latino (of any race)	63	4.7%

=== 2000 census ===
In 2000, there were 847 people, 440 households, and 124 families residing in the city.

== Education ==
Residents are in the Lowndes County School District. Lowndes High School is the zoned comprehensive high school.
