= Lowndes County, Georgia =

County in Georgia, United States

- County
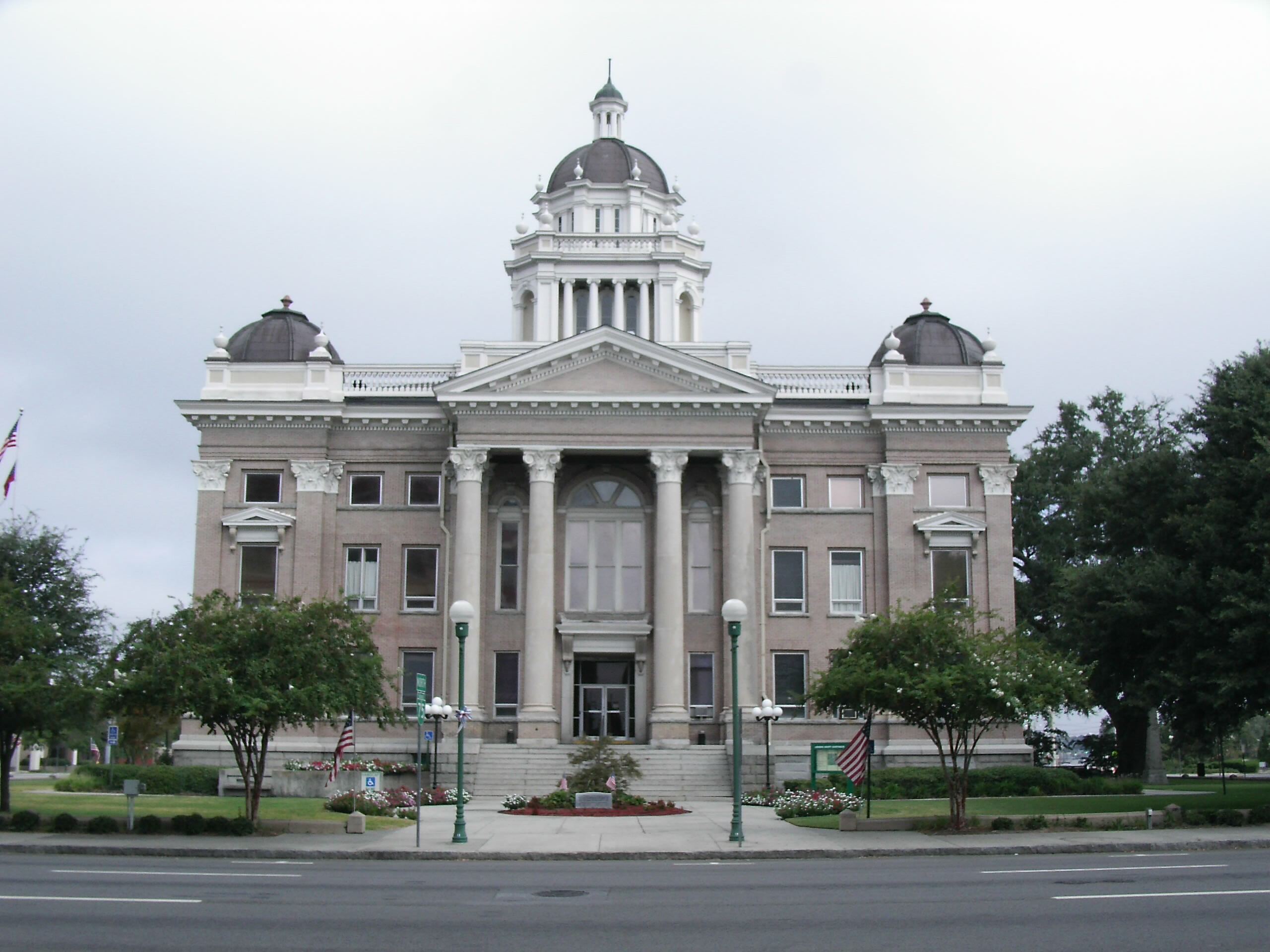
- Lowndes County Courthouse in Valdosta

- Seal Logo

- Location within the U.S. state of Georgia
- Coordinates: 30°50′N 83°16′W
- Country: United States
- State: Georgia
- Founded: December 23, 1825; 200 years ago
- Named for: William Jones Lowndes
- Seat: Valdosta
- Largest city: Valdosta

Area
  - Total: 511 sq mi (1,320 km^{2})
  - Land: 496 sq mi (1,280 km^{2})
  - Water: 15 sq mi (39 km^{2}) 2.8%

Population (2020)
  - Total: 118,251
  - Estimate (2025): 122,867 ▲
  - Density: 220/sq mi (85/km^{2})
- Time zone: UTC−5 (Eastern)
  - Summer (DST): UTC−4 (EDT)
- Congressional district: 8th
- Website: lowndescounty.com

Lowndes County (/ˈlaʊndz/) is a county located in the south-central portion of the U.S. state of Georgia. As of the 2020 census, the population was 118,251. The county seat is Valdosta. The county was created December 23, 1825.

Lowndes County is included in the Valdosta metropolitan statistical area. It is located along the border with Florida.

The county is a major commercial, educational, and manufacturing center of south Georgia with considerable forest products including pulpwood and naval stores, such as turpentine and rosin. Part of Grand Bay, a 13,000-acre (53 km^{2}) wetlands, is located in Lowndes County.

== History ==
=== Native Americans and the Spanish ===
The land that became Lowndes County had historically been inhabited by the Timucua. During most of the age of European colonization, the area of modern Lowndes County was part of the colony of Spanish Florida. From approximately 1625 to 1657, the Spanish Empire maintained a Catholic mission to the Timucua, dubbed Mission Santa Cruz de Cachipile, in the southern portion of Lowndes County near present-day Lake Park. In the centuries that followed, Timucua civilization collapsed due to slave raiding and disease.

The Creek Nation peoples moved into the area and, by the early 19th century, they were well established here. On December 15, 1818, European Americans organized what they called Irwin County, which had been settled by pushing out the Creek people. In the 1830s Georgia and the federal government completed Indian Removal of most of the Native Americans from what became the state.

=== Early county history ===
Lowndes County was established by an act passed by the Georgia legislature on December 23, 1825. It was formed out of the 8th, 9th, 10th, 11th, 12th, 15th, and 16th land districts of Irwin County, Georgia. The county was named for William Jones Lowndes (1782–1822), a prominent South Carolina lawyer and Congressman. His father Rawlins Lowndes had been a Revolutionary War leader and was elected as South Carolina Governor. The Coffee Road was an improved trail first cut by Georgia militia to supply federal troops in Florida during the Creek Wars. It was the first route through the area of Lowndes County and opened up the area to white settlers.

During the first few years after Lowndes County was organized, its courts met at the tavern owned by Sion Hall on the Coffee Road, near what is now Morven, Georgia in Brooks County, on the west side of the Little River. The first county seat was established at Franklinville (sometimes spelled Franklynville) by the Georgia General Assembly on December 16, 1828. Franklinville was located about 5.6 miles to the east of Hahira in the eastern half of land lot 50 in the 11th land district; it was named after statesman and Founding Father of the United States, Benjamin Franklin.

At the time of the 1830 federal census, Lowndes County had 1,072 white males, 1,044 white females, 156 male slaves, 179 female slaves, and 4 free people of color, for a total population of 2,455. The introduction of steam-powered ships on the Withlacoochee and Little rivers led to a shift in the population toward the rivers. In December 1833 the state legislature passed a law establishing a new county seat at a place to be called Lowndesville. The law called for a courthouse, a jail, and a town to be laid out within land lot 109 in the 12th land district. This land lot is near the present Timber Ridge Road in Lowndes County.

It is uncertain why the plans for Lowndesville were abandoned, but in December 1834, the state legislature authorized commissioners to select a suitable site for a courthouse so that the county seat could be moved away from Franklinville. In October 1836, another group of commissioners was advertising for contracting proposals for the construction of a brick courthouse at Troupville. By Summer 1837, Troupville and Franklinville were both serving as courthouse sites. This continued until at least 1838. In December 1837 Troupville was incorporated. Rumors of the coming of the Brunswick and Chattahoochee Railroad, the opening up of Florida, and the prosperity of the surrounding farmland led to the growth of Troupville and Lowndes County in general. In 1845, the remaining county-owned land at Franklinville was sold at the courthouse in Troupville.

The closest battle to Troupville between Native Americans and whites was at Brushy Creek on November 10, 1836, in modern Berrien County. Creek Nation people were passing through Lowndes County to join the Seminole in Florida. General Winfield Scott, commander of United States field forces in the area, intended to stop the Creek movement and did. Virtually no Native Americans were left in South Georgia.

In February 1850 Lowndes County lost land to the formation of Clinch County. At that time the eastern border of Lowndes County was defined as the Alapaha River. By the time of the 1850 census, Lowndes County had a free white population of 5,339, a free colored population of 20, and a slave population of 2,355. Lowndes County lost additional territory with the establishment of Berrien and Colquitt counties on February 25, 1856.

=== Establishment of Valdosta ===
Many residents of Lowndes County were unhappy when the Atlantic and Gulf Railroad announced June 17, 1858, that they had selected a planned route that would bypass Troupville. On June 22 at 3:00 AM, the Lowndes County courthouse at Troupville was set aflame by William B. Crawford, who fled to South Carolina after being released on bond.

On August 9, a meeting convened in the academy building in Troupville at which it was decided to create from the area of Lowndes County to the west of the Withlacoochee River a new county to be called Brooks County. Brooks was established on December 11. On December 13, 1858, the Georgia General Assembly passed a bill establishing Echols County, Georgia.

In December 1859, the Lowndes County board of commissioners were instructed by an act of the Georgia legislature to purchase land for a new county seat; it was to be along the line of the Atlantic and Gulf Railroad and as close to the center of the county as possible. As part of the same act the Brooks-Lowndes County border was adjusted so that the east bank of the Little River formed the border.

Land belonging to William Wisenbaker was chosen as the site of the new county seat of Valdosta. The arrival of the railroad led to the downfall of Troupville and the rise of Valdosta as a center for the economy of south Georgia. The shifting county boundary lines led to population loss for Lowndes County. The 1860 census showed the county having 2,850 free whites, no free persons of color, and 2,399 slaves.

=== Civil War ===
No battles during the American Civil War were fought in Lowndes County. Several regular Confederate Army companies were raised from the population. Those included:

- Company I "Lowndes Volunteers", 12th Regiment Georgia Infantry.
- Company G, 26th Regiment Georgia Infantry. Also known as New Company G, 13th Regiment Infantry.
- Company D, "Berrien Minutemen", 29th Regiment Georgia Infantry.
- Company D, "Valdosta Guards", 50th Regiment Georgia Infantry.

State Guard units included:

- Company B, "Lowndes Mounted Infantry" 11th Regiment Cavalry, Georgia State Guards.

In addition, two Georgia Militia companies were partially raised from the population in early 1864 following the reorganization of the militia. Those included:

- Company I, 11th Regiment Georgia Militia (which was also partially raised from the population of Ware County, Georgia)
- Company I, 12th Regiment Georgia Militia (which was also partially raised from the populations of Mitchell County, Georgia and Talbot County, Georgia)

Lowndes County also had a home guard unit, but it was only called into action once in the fall of 1863. In that instant some soldiers' wives in Thomasville, Georgia were threatening to break into a Confederate Government Commissary to feed their starving children. In April 1864 a group of women rioted at Stockton, Georgia after a local store owner refused to take Confederate money in exchange for yarn. They took all the yarn in his store. At the same time, armed women stole a wagon load of bacon from a government warehouse. A mob of women also went on a rampage for similar reasons in Naylor, Georgia at about the same time.

In February 1864 members of Company I "Woodson Guards", 32nd Regiment Georgia Infantry camped overnight in Valdosta at an area south of the railroad while on their way to Battle of Olustee in northern Florida. It was to be the closest fighting came to Valdosta during the Civil War. Valdosta became a home for many refugees fleeing into south Georgia due to Sherman's March to the Sea. Among those refugees was the family of Doc Holliday. Other refugees came by the railroad from Savannah and the Sea Islands.

=== Reconstruction ===
In the years right after the Civil War, members of Company "G", 103rd United States Colored Troops were stationed at Valdosta as part of the military occupation of the South during the Reconstruction era.

Several years after the Civil War, 112 African American men, women, and children moved from Lowndes County to Arthington, Liberia in 1871 and 1872. Some settled there permanently to make their home in a colony established for free American blacks; a small number returned to the United States. Their emigration was supported by the American Colonization Society, which had been working since the antebellum years to relocate free blacks to this new colony in West Africa. African Americans dominated the new colony (and future country) both socially and politically well into the 20th century before indigenous peoples, the majority within the borders of the country, came to power.

Prior to 1872, the southern border of Lowndes County and of Georgia was slightly farther south. The border when Lowndes County was created was along what was called McNeil's Line. A dispute over the border between the states of Florida and Georgia later developed (see Florida v. Georgia). In 1857, the governors of the two states appointed surveyors for a joint survey of the border. This led to the creation of the Orr and Whitney Line, which was agreed to by the United States Congress on April 9, 1872.

=== 20th century to present ===
In 1899 the cotton mill town of Remerton was established, and by 1920, Lowndes County lost some territory when Lanier County was established.

==== Lynching of Mary Turner and killing of her unborn child ====
In 1918, a white planter was murdered in Brooks County. He was known to have mistreated his black workers. Sidney Johnson, one of his workers, was suspected in his death. Mobs of whites hunted in Brooks and Lowndes counties for Johnson, rounding up and killing at least 11 other black men and one black woman and her unborn baby in what historian Meyers called "a lynching rampage." One man was killed in Lowndes County and the others in Brooks. Mary Turner, the married mother of two young children and eight months pregnant, was brutally murdered in Lowndes County, near Folsom Bridge on the Little River. The unborn child was then cut from her womb and its head crushed by a booted foot of one of the participants in the lynching. Her husband had been lynched the day before although neither had anything to do with the white planter's death. None of the lynching participants were prosecuted.

On May 15, 2010, a historical marker memorializing "Mary Turner and the Lynching Rampage" was placed near the lynching site in Lowndes County and dedicated. The plaque includes a description of the associated murders of black people by white mobs in 1918, especially the lynchings of the Turners. In July 2013, the plaque was found to have five bullet holes shot by an unknown vandal. Since 2013, the plaque now has as many as 27 bullet holes and more recently, was struck multiple times by “some kind of off-road vehicle,” Mark Patrick George, coordinator for the Mary Turner Project, announced in October 2020. The historical marker has been since removed. Project officials said the historical marker will be stored until re-installment plans are made. It is unclear if authorities are investigating the latest vandalism incident.

==== World War II ====
On September 15, 1941, Moody Air Force Base opened. it was part of the federal government's investment in military facilities in the South. The region received considerable Federal monies during World War II.

== Geography ==
According to the U.S. Census Bureau, the county has a total area of 511 square miles (1,320 km^{2}), of which 496 square miles (1,280 km^{2}) is land and 15 square miles (39 km^{2}) (2.8%) is water.

The north-central (east of Hahira), west-central (bordered by a north–south line that bisects Valdosta), and southwestern portions (west of Dasher) of Lowndes County are located in the Withlacoochee River sub-basin of the Suwannee River basin. The northwestern corner of the county is located in the Little River sub-basin of the same Suwannee River basin. The eastern portion of Lowndes County is located in the Alapaha River sub-basin of the larger Suwannee River basin.

=== Adjacent counties ===
- Berrien County (north)
- Lanier County (northeast)
- Echols County (east)
- Hamilton County, Florida (southeast)
- Madison County, Florida (southwest)
- Brooks County (west)
- Cook County (northwest)

=== Major waterways ===
- Alapaha River
- Alapahoochee River
- Grand Bay Creek (known in the 1800s as Irwin's River and later as Irwin's Creek)
- Little River (Withlacoochee River)
- Withlacoochee River (Suwannee River)

== Communities ==
=== Cities ===
- Hahira
- Lake Park
- Remerton
- Valdosta (county seat)

=== Town ===
- Dasher

=== Census-designated place ===
- Bemiss
- Clyattville
- Moody AFB
- Naylor

=== Unincorporated communities ===
- Barretts
- Blanton
- Franklinville (historic)
- Indianola
- Kinderlou
- Mineola
- Old Clyattville
- Olympia (historic)
- Ousley
- Troupville
- Twin Lakes

== Demographics ==
Historical population
Census	Pop.	Note	%±
1830	2,453		—
1840	5,574		127.2%
1850	7,714		38.4%
1860	5,249		−32.0%
1870	8,321		58.5%
1880	11,049		32.8%
1890	15,102		36.7%
1900	20,036		32.7%
1910	24,436		22.0%
1920	26,521		8.5%
1930	29,994		13.1%
1940	31,860		6.2%
1950	35,211		10.5%
1960	49,270		39.9%
1970	55,112		11.9%
1980	67,972		23.3%
1990	75,981		11.8%
2000	92,115		21.2%
2010	109,233		18.6%
2020	118,251		8.3%
2025 (est.)	122,867	▲	3.9%
U.S. Decennial Census; 1790-1880 1890-1910; 1920-1930 1930-1940; 1940-1950 1960-1980; 1980-2000 2010

=== Racial and ethnic composition ===
Lowndes County, Georgia – Racial and ethnic composition Note: the US Census treats Hispanic/Latino as an ethnic category. This table excludes Latinos from the racial categories and assigns them to a separate category. Hispanics/Latinos may be of any race.
Race / Ethnicity (NH = Non-Hispanic)	Pop 1980	Pop 1990	Pop 2000	Pop 2010	Pop 2020	% 1980	% 1990	% 2000	% 2010	% 2020
White alone (NH)	46,268	50,013	55,992	61,234	59,306	68.07%	65.82%	60.78%	56.06%	50.15%
Black or African American alone (NH)	20,312	24,151	31,128	38,815	43,946	29.88%	31.79%	33.79%	35.53%	37.16%
Native American or Alaska Native alone (NH)	113	213	305	305	312	0.17%	0.28%	0.33%	0.28%	0.26%
Asian alone (NH)	259	599	1,081	1,561	1,908	0.38%	0.79%	1.17%	1.43%	1.61%
Native Hawaiian or Pacific Islander alone (NH)	x	x	37	92	100	x	x	0.04%	0.08%	0.08%
Other race alone (NH)	145	14	104	244	450	0.21%	0.02%	0.11%	0.22%	0.38%
Mixed race or Multiracial (NH)	x	x	1,021	1,744	4,357	x	x	1.11%	1.60%	3.68%
Hispanic or Latino (any race)	875	991	2,447	5,238	7,872	1.29%	1.30%	2.66%	4.80%	6.66%
Total	67,972	75,981	92,115	109,233	118,251	100.00%	100.00%	100.00%	100.00%	100.00%

=== 2020 census ===
As of the 2020 census, there were 118,251 people, 44,207 households, and 26,536 families residing in the county. The median age was 32.8 years, with 24.7% of residents under the age of 18 and 13.4% aged 65 or older.

For every 100 females there were 92.5 males, and for every 100 females age 18 and over there were 89.4 males age 18 and over. 64.9% of residents lived in urban areas, while 35.1% lived in rural areas.

The racial makeup of the county as of the 2020 census was 51.7% White, 37.6% Black or African American, 0.4% American Indian and Alaska Native, 1.7% Asian, 0.1% Native Hawaiian and Pacific Islander, 2.7% from some other race, and 5.8% from two or more races. Hispanic or Latino residents of any race comprised 6.7% of the population.

There were 44,207 households in the county, of which 33.5% had children under the age of 18 living with them and 32.9% had a female householder with no spouse or partner present. About 27.5% of all households were made up of individuals and 9.8% had someone living alone who was 65 years of age or older.

There were 48,717 housing units, of which 9.3% were vacant. Among occupied housing units, 53.2% were owner-occupied and 46.8% were renter-occupied. The homeowner vacancy rate was 2.2% and the rental vacancy rate was 7.9%.

== Courthouses ==
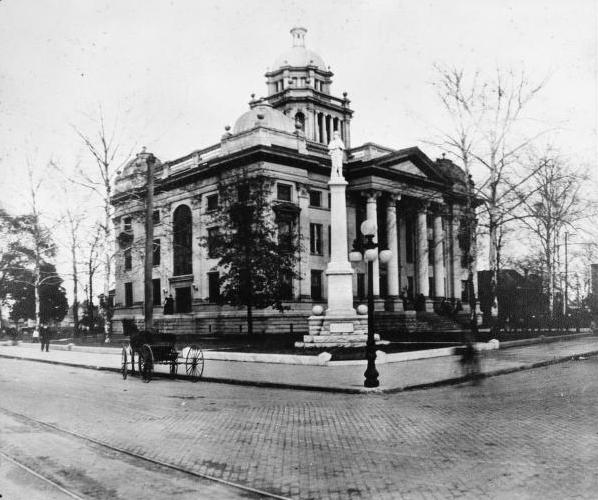
The Old Lowndes County Courthouse as it appeared around the early 1900s.

The county's former courthouse was built circa 1905 and is listed on the National Register of Historic Places; it was the county's seventh courthouse. The first courthouse was built in 1828 at Franklinville, the original county seat. In 1834 another courthouse was built at the new county seat of Troupville. It was replaced by a new courthouse in 1842. The 1842 structure was destroyed by a fire set by William B. Crawford in June 1858.

The first courthouse at Valdosta was built in 1860 and was a wooden structure that was sold for the funding of a new courthouse by 1869. The wooden building used for the courts of ordinary burned down in 1869. Lowndes County was without an official courthouse for a number of years. A two-story brick building was completed in 1874. In 1900, county commissioners decided that a larger structure was needed. In March 1904 the old courthouse was demolished and in 1905, the seventh courthouse was completed. This is the structure that is locally referred to in the 21st century as 'the old courthouse.' In August and September 2010, the county government moved to a new judicial complex.

The 1905 Lowndes County Courthouse is widely acknowledged as one of the most beautiful county courthouses in Georgia. It is used for meetings, public display, and other community attractions. Today it is used for many events, meetings, and political purposes.

== Education ==
Residents not in the Valdosta city limits are in the Lowndes County School District, while those in the Valdosta city limits are in the Valdosta City School District. Lowndes High School and Valdosta High School are the district's respective comprehensive high schools.

- Valwood School is a private school in the county.
- Valdosta State University is in Valdosta.
- South Georgia Regional Library operates libraries in the county.

== Politics ==
United States presidential election results for Lowndes County, Georgia
Year	Republican		Democratic		Third party(ies)	
Year	No.	%	No.	%	No.	%
1880	660	46.94%	746	53.06%	0	0.00%
1884	598	47.99%	648	52.01%	0	0.00%
1888	643	45.06%	767	53.75%	17	1.19%
1892	509	29.05%	988	56.39%	255	14.55%
1896	536	45.62%	586	49.87%	53	4.51%
1900	277	37.48%	444	60.08%	18	2.44%
1904	289	23.73%	888	72.91%	41	3.37%
1908	154	16.61%	681	73.46%	92	9.92%
1912	35	3.86%	847	93.49%	24	2.65%
1916	88	4.36%	1,870	92.67%	60	2.97%
1920	220	14.40%	1,308	85.60%	0	0.00%
1924	57	4.71%	1,095	90.42%	59	4.87%
1928	596	29.67%	1,413	70.33%	0	0.00%
1932	97	4.99%	1,840	94.65%	7	0.36%
1936	130	3.98%	3,099	94.89%	37	1.13%
1940	260	9.21%	2,551	90.40%	11	0.39%
1944	401	16.09%	2,092	83.91%	0	0.00%
1948	634	16.02%	1,867	47.17%	1,457	36.81%
1952	2,079	39.05%	3,245	60.95%	0	0.00%
1956	2,135	35.17%	3,936	64.83%	0	0.00%
1960	2,908	44.65%	3,605	55.35%	0	0.00%
1964	6,811	60.95%	4,363	39.04%	1	0.01%
1968	3,073	27.55%	2,402	21.53%	5,679	50.91%
1972	7,812	79.50%	2,015	20.50%	0	0.00%
1976	4,512	33.82%	8,830	66.18%	0	0.00%
1980	6,622	51.29%	5,989	46.38%	301	2.33%
1984	10,437	62.86%	6,167	37.14%	0	0.00%
1988	10,855	62.63%	6,427	37.08%	51	0.29%
1992	10,276	46.30%	9,019	40.64%	2,897	13.05%
1996	10,578	48.92%	9,470	43.79%	1,576	7.29%
2000	14,462	56.87%	10,616	41.74%	354	1.39%
2004	18,981	59.91%	12,516	39.50%	187	0.59%
2008	21,269	54.19%	17,597	44.83%	384	0.98%
2012	21,327	54.38%	17,470	44.54%	424	1.08%
2016	21,635	56.84%	15,064	39.58%	1,364	3.58%
2020	25,692	55.40%	20,116	43.38%	567	1.22%
2024	28,081	58.75%	19,487	40.77%	227	0.47%

United States Senate election results for Lowndes County, Georgia2
Year	Republican		Democratic		Third party(ies)	
Year	No.	%	No.	%	No.	%
2020	25,620	55.97%	19,124	41.78%	1,028	2.25%
2020	22,464	56.40%	17,369	43.60%	0	0.00%

United States Senate election results for Lowndes County, Georgia3
Year	Republican		Democratic		Third party(ies)	
Year	No.	%	No.	%	No.	%
2020	12,607	27.93%	7,931	17.57%	24,607	54.51%
2020	22,455	56.37%	17,382	43.63%	0	0.00%
2022	20,213	58.40%	13,849	40.01%	550	1.59%
2022	18,448	58.43%	13,126	41.57%	0	0.00%

Georgia Gubernatorial election results for Lowndes County
Year	Republican		Democratic		Third party(ies)	
Year	No.	%	No.	%	No.	%
2022	21,256	61.15%	13,275	38.19%	229	0.66%

As of the 2020s, Lowndes County is a Republican stronghold, voting 59% for Donald Trump in 2024. Up until 1960, Lowndes County voted with the Democrats, as with most of the Solid South. It flipped in 1964 when it voted for Republican Barry Goldwater and has remained reliably Republican since then. The last Democrat to carry the county was Jimmy Carter in 1976.

For elections to the United States House of Representatives, Lowndes County is part of Georgia's 8th congressional district, currently represented by Austin Scott. For elections to the Georgia State Senate, Lowndes County is part of District 8. For elections to the Georgia House of Representatives, Lowndes County is covered by districts 174, 175, 176 and 177.

== Transportation ==
=== Major highways ===
- Interstate 75 / State Route 401 (unsigned)
- U.S. Route 41 / State Route 7
  - U.S. Route 41 Business / State Route 7 Business
  - State Route 7 Alternate
- U.S. Route 84 / State Route 38
- U.S. Route 221
- State Route 31
- State Route 94
- State Route 122
- State Route 125
- State Route 133
- State Route 135
- State Route 376

=== Pedestrians and cycling ===
- Azalea City Trail
- VSU Walking Trail System

=== Railroads ===
==== Previous ====
- Atlantic Coast Line Railroad
- Atlantic and Gulf Railroad
- Atlantic, Valdosta and Western Railway
- Georgia Southern Railroad
- Georgia Southern and Florida Railway
- Plant System
- Savannah, Florida and Western Railway
- Valdosta, Moultrie and Western Railroad

==== Current ====
All of the railroads serving Lowndes County today are freight-only; the closest Amtrak passenger stops are at Folkston and Jesup, both about 100 miles away.

- CSX Transportation
- Georgia and Florida Railroad
- Norfolk Southern Railway
- Valdosta Railway

== See also ==
- National Register of Historic Places listings in Lowndes County, Georgia
- List of counties in Georgia
