= Olympia, Georgia =

Coordinates: 30°39′16.74″N 83°20′44.54″W

Olympia is an extinct town in Lowndes County, in the U.S. state of Georgia.

== History ==
A post office called Olympia was established in 1898, and remained in operation until 1916. The community derives its name from Mount Olympus, in Greece.
