= Blanton, Georgia =

Unincorporated community in Georgia, U.S.

Coordinates: 30°49′49″N 83°07′08″W

Blanton is an unincorporated community in Lowndes County, in the U.S. state of Georgia.

== History ==
Blanton was laid out in 1896, and named after J. N. Blanton, an original owner of the site. A post office called Blanton was established in 1899, and remained in operation until 1918. A variant name was "Blanton Station". In 1900, the community had 88 inhabitants.
