= Little River (Withlacoochee River tributary) =

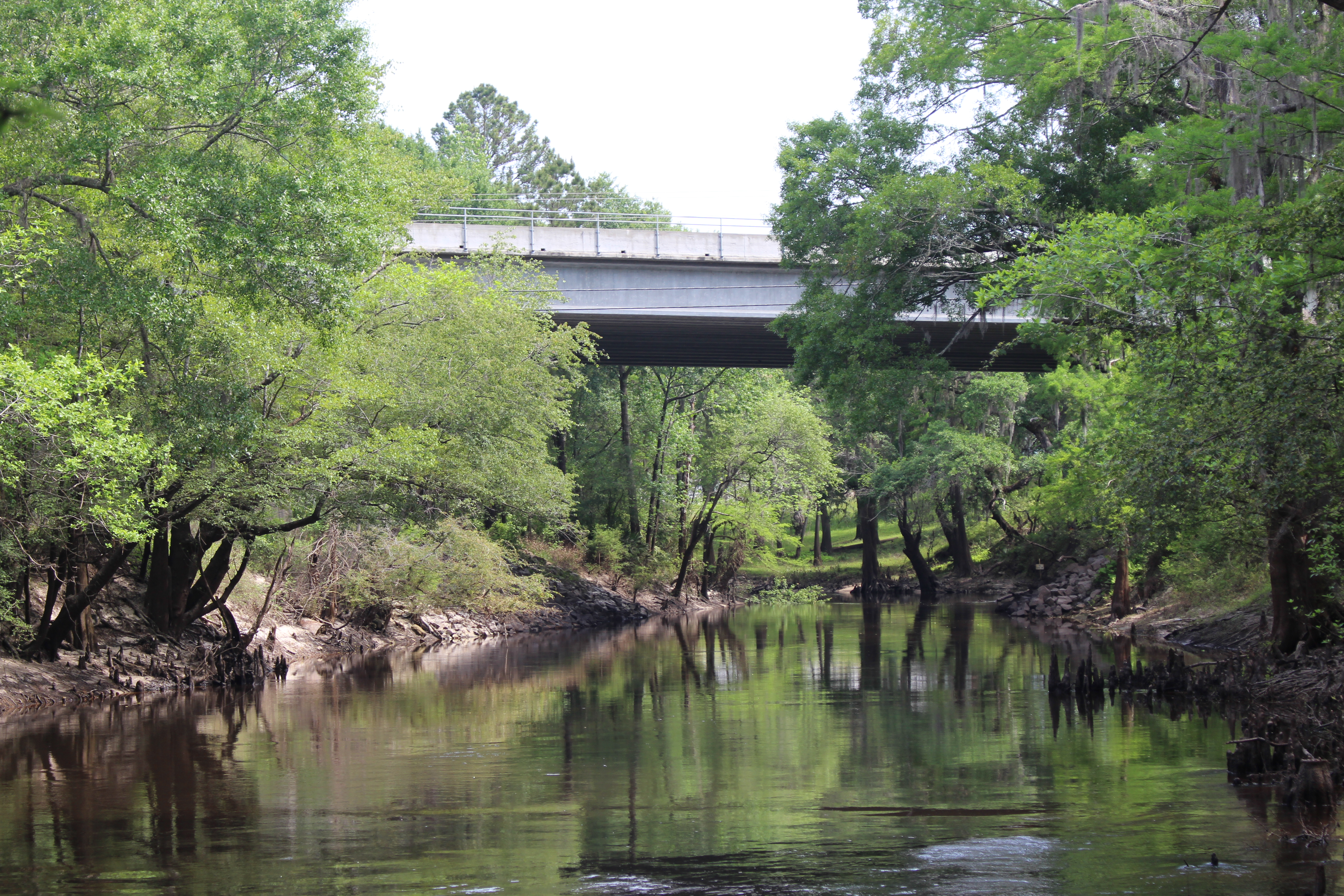

Location
- Country: United States

Physical characteristics
- Source
  - location: Georgia

The Little River is a 105-mile-long (169 km) tributary of the Withlacoochee River in the U.S. state of Georgia. Via the Withlacoochee and the Suwannee River its waters flow to the Gulf of Mexico. The Little River was also known historically as the Ockolocoochee River.

The Little River rises in northwestern Turner County, Georgia, 7 miles (11 km) northwest of Ashburn. The river flows southeast into Tift County, passing west of Tifton, then turns more southerly as it becomes the boundary between Colquitt and Cook counties. The river subsequently becomes the boundary between Cook and Brooks counties, then between Brooks and Lowndes counties. It flows into the Withlacoochee River 4 miles (6 km) west of the center of Valdosta near the now abandoned town of Troupville, Georgia.

== Recreation ==
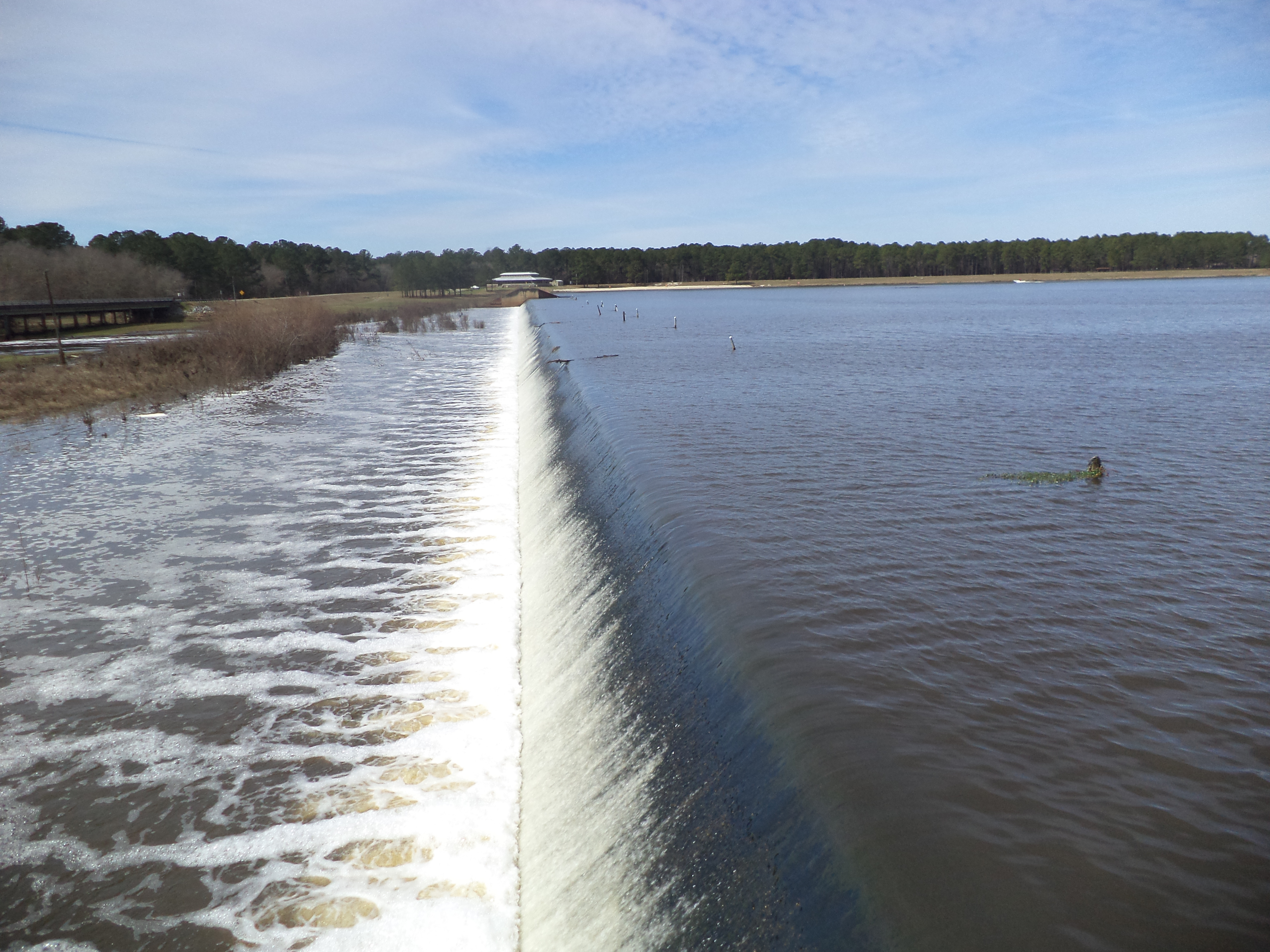
Reed Bingham Lake and dam

Reed Bingham State Park is a recreational area along the Little River. It includes a 375-acre (1.52 km^{2}) lake created by a dam built in 1965 across the river.

== Tributaries ==
Some named tributaries to the Little River include:

- Warrior Creek (named after Warrior John, a Cherokee warrior)
  - Town Creek
    - Hog Heaven Branch
  - Briar Branch
  - Horse Creek
  - Lolly Creek
  - Ty Ty Creek

== Crossings ==
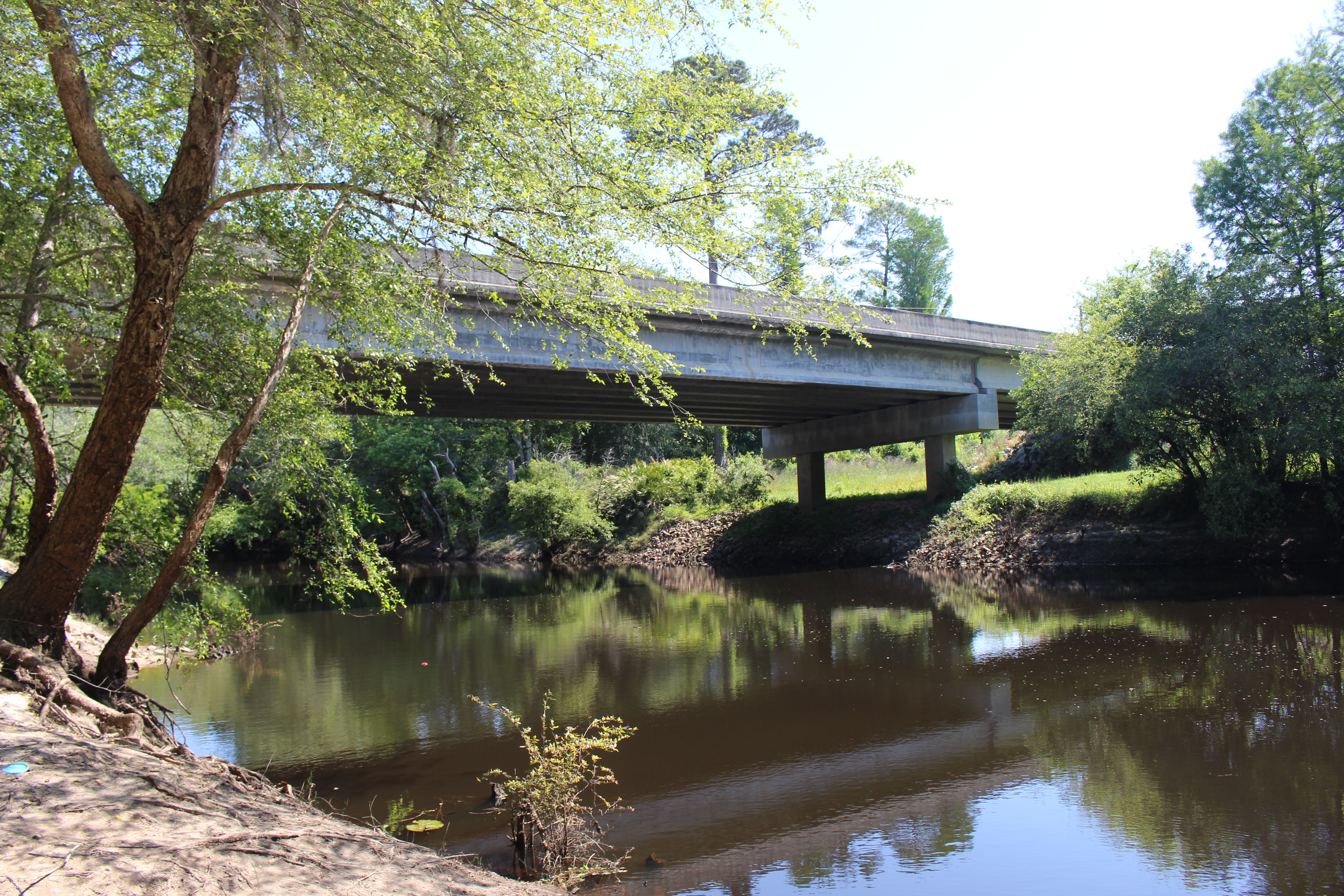
SR 37 crossing over Colquitt/Cook county line.

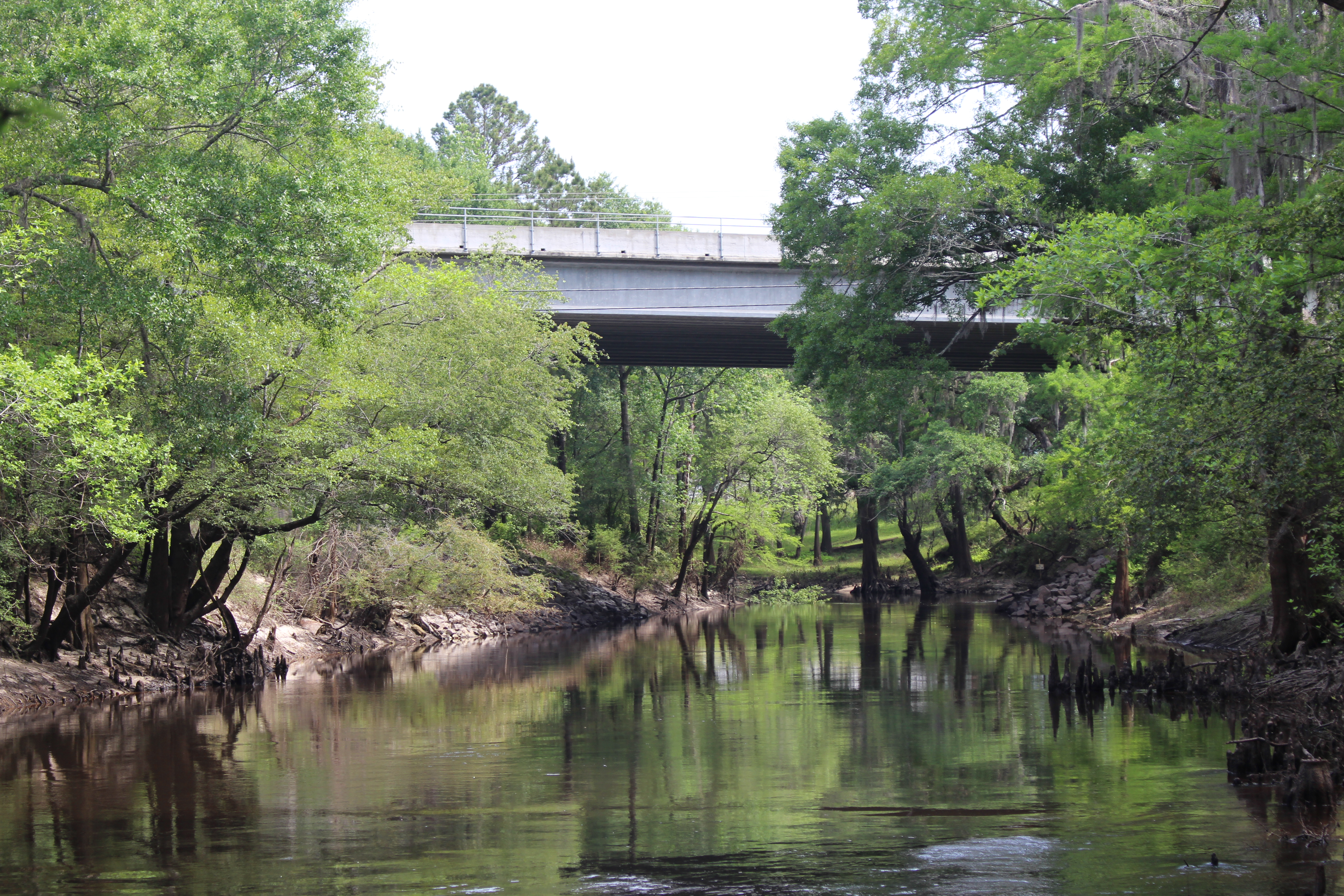
SR 133 crossing over Brooks/Lowndes county line.

Crossing	Carries	Image	Location	ID number	Coordinates
=== Georgia ===
	Jefferson Street				31.707847°N 83.738176°W
	SR 32		Ashburn, Georgia to Leesburg, Georgia		31.692374°N 83.702215°W
	SR 112		Ashburn, Georgia to Sylvester, Georgia		31.674634°N 83.690581°W
	Georgia, Ashburn, Sylvester and Camilla Railway (Closed 1971)				31.672323°N 83.685480°W
	Cannon Road				31.670894°N 83.683701°W
	Cofer Road				31.654830°N 83.664245°W
	Coverdale Highway				31.640994°N 83.659159°W
	Nesmith Road				31.604853°N 83.631262°W
	Little River Road				31.559008°N 83.638366°W
Whiddon's Bridge	Ty Ty Whiddon Mill Road				31.532688°N 83.627662°W
Parkers Ford					31.503447°N 83.602278°W
	Upper Ty Ty Road				31.481761°N 83.584119°W
	Brunswick and Albany Railroad (Defunct)				31.460794°N 83.578543°W
Five Bridges	US 82		Ty Ty, Georgia to Tifton, Georgia		31.388734°N 83.536776°W
Overstreet Bridge	US 319		Moultrie, Georgia to Tifton, Georgia		31.391326°N 83.541434°W
	Tifton and Moultrie Railroad (Closed 1903, defunct)				31.388734°N 83.536776°W
	Omega-Eldorado Road				31.351108°N 83.521744°W
Lott Bridge	Lott Bridge Road				31.299154°N 83.514511°W
Rentz Bridge	Rentz Bridge Road (Defunct)				31.275555°N 83.507725°W
Kinard Bridge	Kinard Bridge Road				31.254143°N 83.507980°W
Flat Ford					31.221394°N 83.508194°W
Roundtree Bridge	Roundtree Bridge Road		Reed Bingham State Park		31.192859°N 83.521367°W
	CR 221; Reed Bingham Road		Reed Bingham State Park		31.160931°N 83.543237°W
	Sparks Western Railway				31.160057°N 83.543050°W
Whitehurst Bridge	SR 37		Moultrie, Georgia to Adel, Georgia		31.155438°N 83.543581°W
McConnell Bridge	McConnell Bridge Road and China Grove Church Road (Defunct)				31.122613°N 83.555122°W
Burney Bridge	SR 250; SR 277				31.068035°N 83.564617°W
	Live Oak, Perry & South Georgia Railroad				31.052020°N 83.500841°W
Rock Bridge/Stone Bridge	Old Georgia State Route 76/Old Quitman Annex Road (Defunct)		Barney, Georgia to Adel, Georgia		31.049811°N 83.499336°W
	SR 76		Barney, Georgia to Adel, Georgia		31.039561°N 83.493342°W
Old Folsom Bridge	(Closed and replaced early 1940s)				31.001546°N 83.458540°W
Folsom Bridge	SR 122				31.000444°N 83.456829°W
Miller Bridge (Formerly Joyces Ferry)	Lawson Millpond Road and Morven Road				30.973242°N 83.442477°W
Tucker Bridge	Myers Bluff Road (Defunct)				30.925687°N 83.436786°W
	SR 133		Troupville, Georgia		30.852887°N 83.346678°W

== See also ==
- List of rivers of Georgia
