= Bemiss, Georgia =

- Unincorporated community Census-designated place
- Location within Georgia Location within the United States
- Coordinates: 30°55′59″N 83°14′27″W
- Country: United States
- State: Georgia
- County: Lowndes

Area
  - Total: 7.80 sq mi (20.21 km^{2})
  - Land: 7.74 sq mi (20.04 km^{2})
  - Water: 0.066 sq mi (0.17 km^{2})
- Elevation: 245 ft (75 m)

Population (2020)
  - Total: 8,999
  - Density: 1,163.0/sq mi (449.02/km^{2})
- Time zone: UTC-5 (Eastern (EST))
  - Summer (DST): UTC-4 (EDT)
- ZIP Code: 31605 (Valdosta)
- Area code: 229
- FIPS code: 13-06968
- GNIS feature ID: 2812690

Bemiss is an unincorporated community and census-designated place (CDP) in northern Lowndes County, Georgia, United States. It is on Georgia State Route 125, 8 miles (13 km) north of the center of Valdosta, the county seat.

Per the 2020 census, the population was 8,999.

== Demographics ==
Historical population
Census	Pop.	Note	%±
2020	8,999		—
U.S. Decennial Census; 2020

Bemiss was first listed as a census designated place in the 2020 census.

=== 2020 census ===
As of the 2020 census, Bemiss had a population of 8,999. The median age was 31.5 years. 29.6% of residents were under the age of 18 and 9.1% of residents were 65 years of age or older. For every 100 females there were 95.9 males, and for every 100 females age 18 and over there were 93.4 males age 18 and over.

88.0% of residents lived in urban areas, while 12.0% lived in rural areas.

There were 3,093 households in Bemiss, of which 44.3% had children under the age of 18 living in them. Of all households, 59.5% were married-couple households, 14.4% were households with a male householder and no spouse or partner present, and 20.9% were households with a female householder and no spouse or partner present. About 16.3% of all households were made up of individuals and 4.8% had someone living alone who was 65 years of age or older.

There were 3,239 housing units, of which 4.5% were vacant. The homeowner vacancy rate was 1.5% and the rental vacancy rate was 5.1%.

Bemiss CDP, Georgia – Racial and ethnic composition Note: the US Census treats Hispanic/Latino as an ethnic category. This table excludes Latinos from the racial categories and assigns them to a separate category. Hispanics/Latinos may be of any race.
Race / Ethnicity (NH = Non-Hispanic)	Pop 2020	% 2020
White alone (NH)	4,868	54.09%
Black or African American alone (NH)	2,539	28.21%
Native American or Alaska Native alone (NH)	35	0.39%
Asian alone (NH)	252	2.80%
Pacific Islander alone (NH)	12	0.13%
Other race alone (NH)	62	0.69%
Mixed race or Multiracial (NH)	509	5.66%
Hispanic or Latino (any race)	722	8.02%
Total	8,999	100.00%

== Education ==
Residents are in the Lowndes County School District. Lowndes High School is the zoned comprehensive high school.
