= Grand Bay (Georgia) =

Swamp in Georgia, United States

Coordinates: 30°56′05″N 83°10′24″W

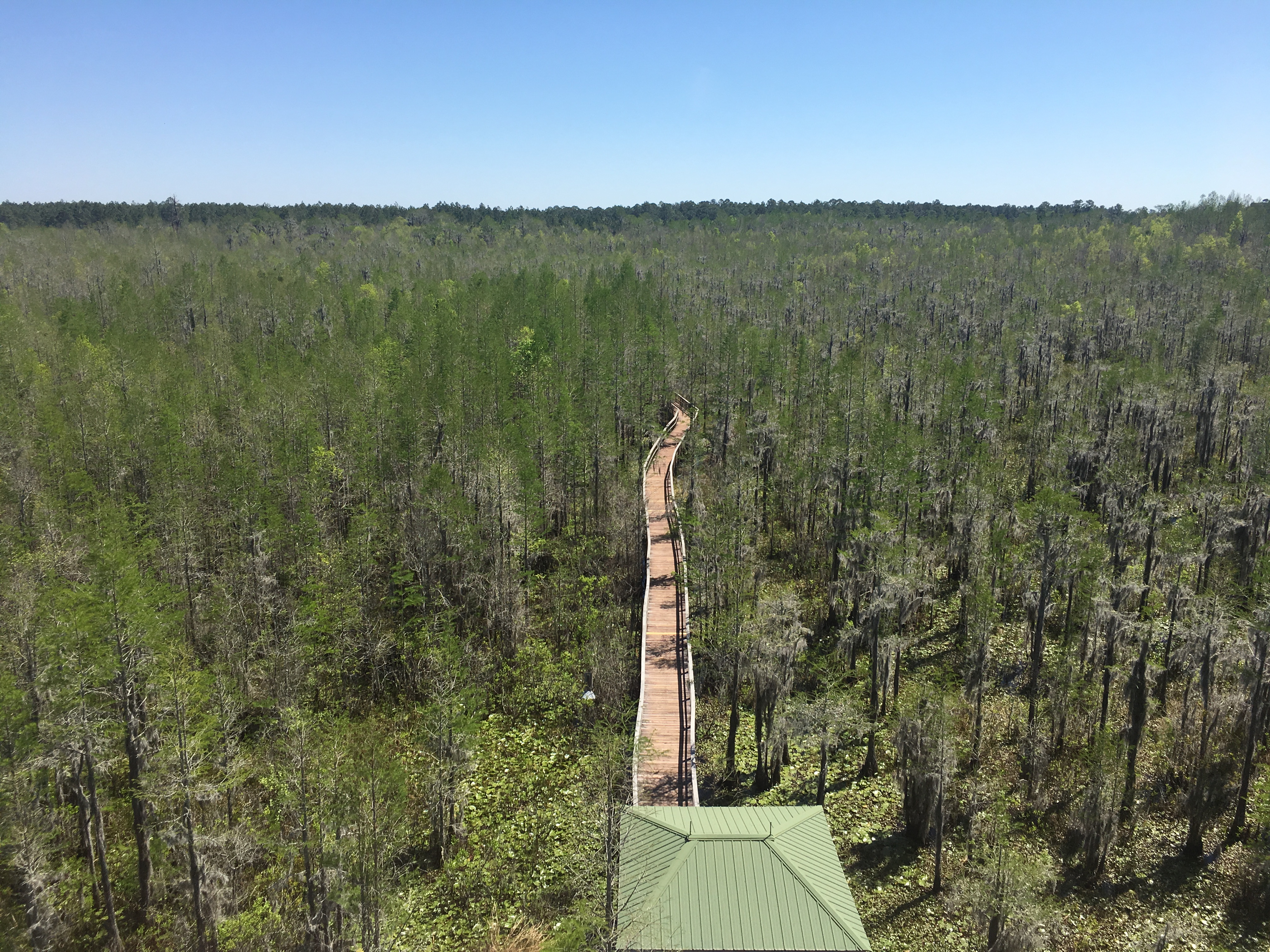
Grand Bay Wildlife Management Area as seen from the lookout tower, March 2019

Grand Bay is a 13,000-acre (53 km^{2}) swamp located in Lanier County and Lowndes County, Georgia. It consists of Grand Bay Wildlife Management Area, an educational wildlife area, and Banks Lake National Wildlife Refuge, a recreational and educational lake.

== Grand Bay Wetland Education Center ==
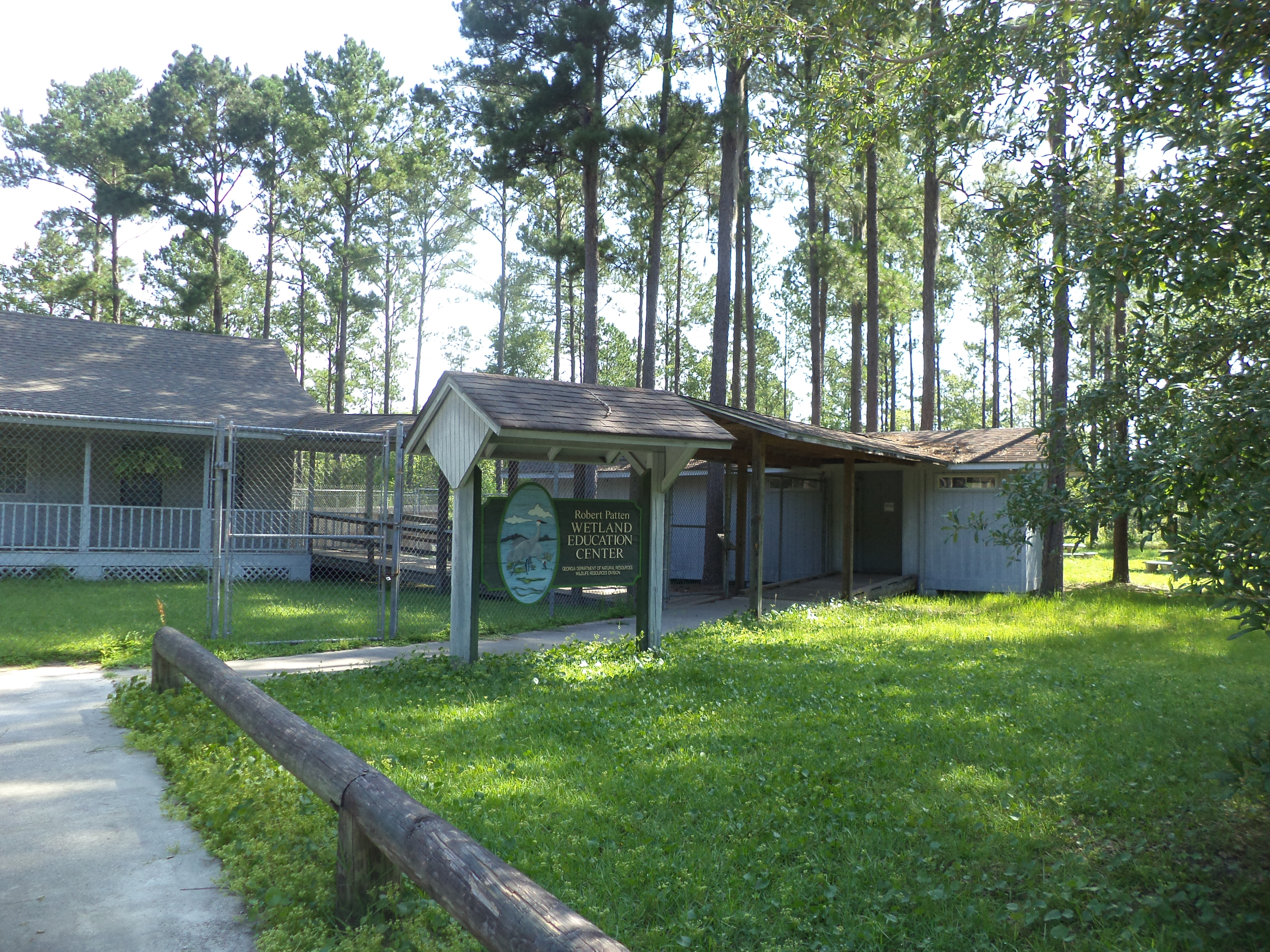
Grand Bay Wetlands Management Area Robert Patten Wetland Education Center

The Grand Bay Wetland Education Center is operated as a partnership by the Coastal Plains Regional Educational Service Agency and the Georgia Department of Natural Resources. The Center features a boardwalk, education rooms and observation tower, and offers environmental education programs about the wetlands, field trips and accredited teacher training. The center teaches students about the relationship of plants and animals, with a focus on wetland ecology, wildlife and plant identification, air quality, and plant adaptations.
