= Kinderlou, Georgia =

Unincorporated community in Georgia, U.S.

Coordinates: 30°48′04″N 83°22′03″W

Kinderlou is an unincorporated community in Lowndes County, Georgia, United States.

== History ==
A post office called Kinderlou was established in 1901, and remained in operation until 1933. The community was named after the sister of a local landowner.
