= Franklinville, Georgia =

Unincorporated community in Georgia, U.S.

Coordinates: 30°58′56″N 83°17′00″W

Franklinville is an unincorporated community in Lowndes County, in the U.S. state of Georgia.

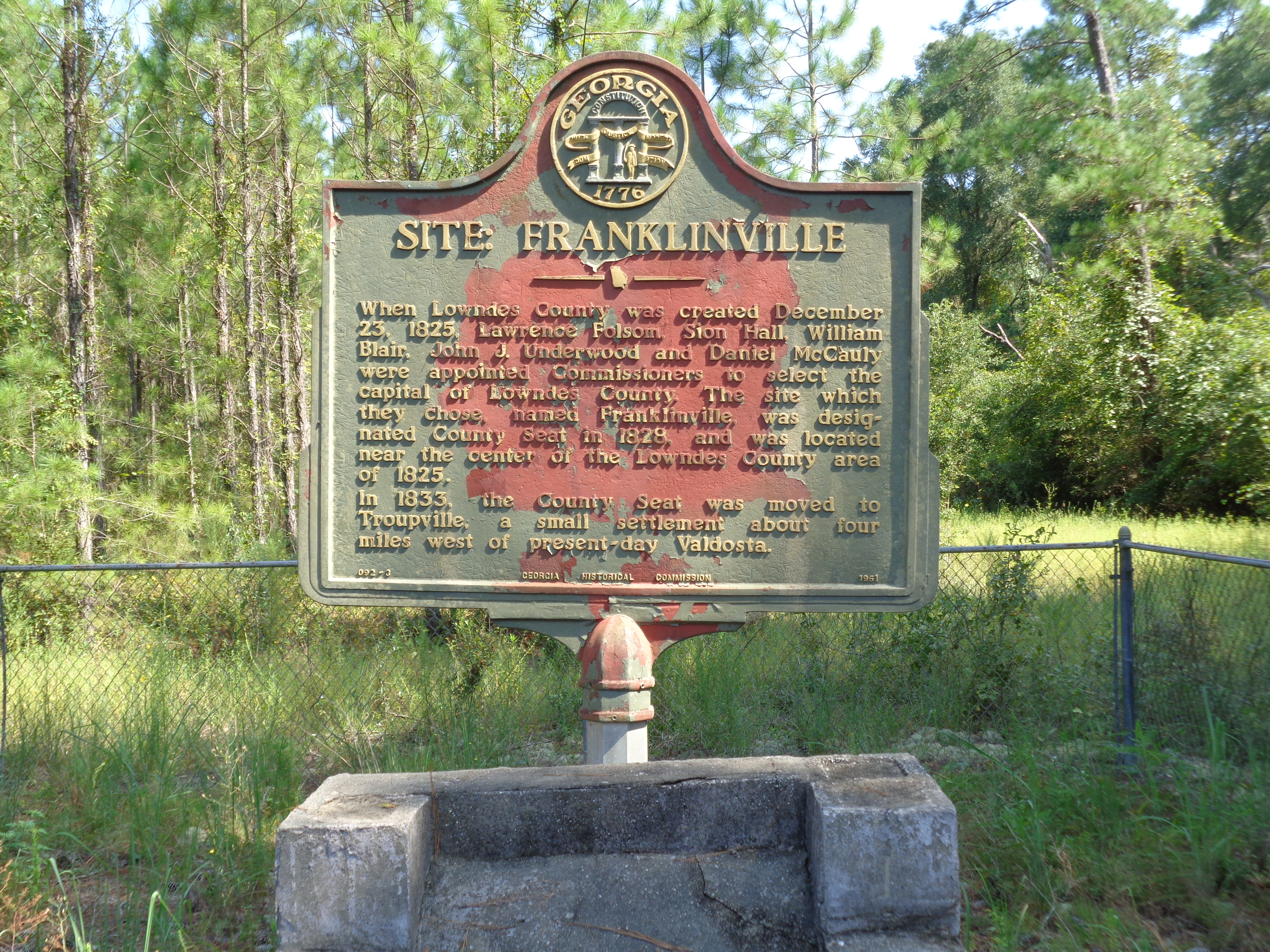
Franklinville historical marker

== History ==
Franklinville was once the county seat of Lowndes County.
