= Clyattville, Georgia =

- Unincorporated community Census-designated place
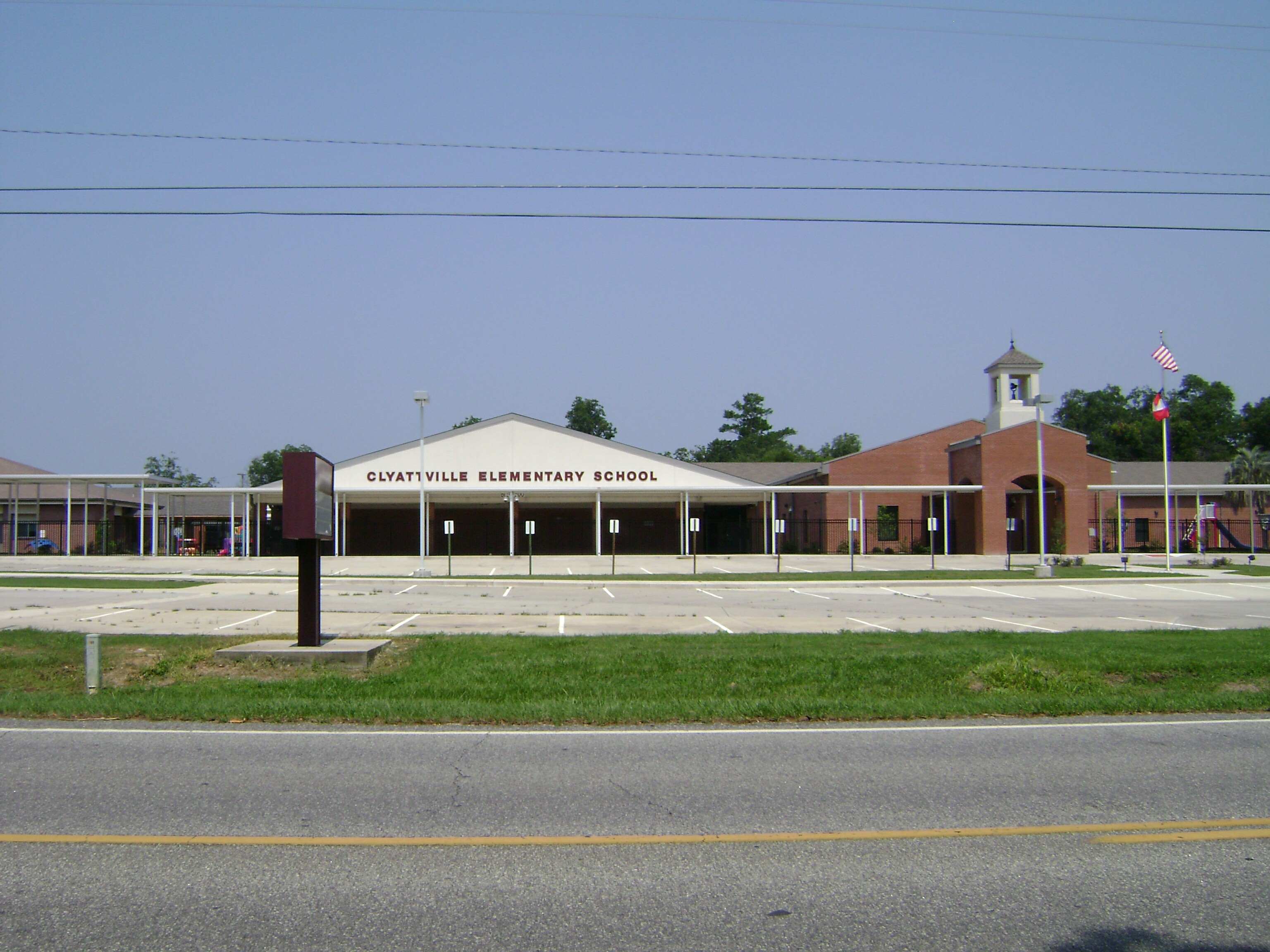
- Clyattville Elementary School

- Location in Georgia Location in the United States
- Coordinates: 30°41′29″N 83°18′55″W
- Country: United States
- State: Georgia
- County: Lowndes

Population (2020)
  - Total: 552
- Time zone: UTC-5 (Eastern (EST))
  - Summer (DST): UTC-4 (EDT)

Clyattville is an unincorporated community and census-designated place (CDP) in Lowndes County, Georgia, United States. It was established in the 1840s.

The 2020 census listed a population of 552.

== History ==
When Clyattville was first settled, there were only a few families to establish residence. These families included the Brays, the Hunters, the Lanes, the Arnolds, the Covingtons, the Quillians, and the Clyatts.

Clyattville has not always been located at is current location. From 1837 to 1848, the community was known as Forest Grove and was located to the north-west of the current location. It was centered around the Forest Grove Primitive Baptist Church. The only current sign of Forest Grove is the local cemetery by the same name, which still serves as the primary cemetery for modern Clyattville. In 1848, the post office for the community was transferred a short distance away to the store of James M. Clyatt. Clyatt's store had existed for about a decade at that point along a stagecoach route between Troupville, Georgia and Bellville, Florida. The store was located near the intersection of Ousley Road and Old Clyattville Road about 1.4 miles (2.3 km) north-west of the current location of Clyattville. The store was previously owned by James Claytt's father Samuel Mills Clyatt, who had owned a plantation which covered most of the area around Clyattville.

In the late 1890s, the Valdosta Railway was built between Valdosta, Georgia and Madison, Florida. The route of railroad bypassed the location of Old Clyattville by less than a mile. The community shifted towards where the old stage coach route crossed the railway.

The first store in modern Clyattville was owned by the Bray family. Since then, many more stores have been established, including Zipperer's Grocery (located across the street from the Clyattville Elementary School); a Minute Markest, now a Holiday Market (on the Lake Park-Clyattville Highway); J.W.'s Grocery (located on the Madison Highway); and Clyattville 66 (located at the corner of the Madison Highway and the Lake Park-Clyattville Highway). There once was a grist mill, a cotton gin, a drugstore, and only one church, the Methodist Church.

Early Clyattville was mainly agricultural, and its community thrived on farming. In the early 1950s, Owens-Illinois built a paper mill and a bag plant. C.A. Baucom built a cotton gin.

Residents traveled by buggies or wagon until they could afford cars. The first person to own a car in Clyattville was Dr. Quillian. His office was a wooden building in Olympia (the old saw mill town along the route of the Valdosta Railway).

Wild Adventures was established in the 1990s as Liberty Farms 2 miles (3.2 km) north of Clyattville.

== Demographics ==
Historical population
Census	Pop.	Note	%±
2020	552		—
U.S. Decennial Census; 1850-1870 1870-1880; 1890-1910 1920-1930; 1940 1950 1960; 1970 1980 1990; 2000 2010-2020

Clyattville was first listed as a census designated place in the 2020 census.

Clyattville CDP, Georgia – Racial and ethnic composition Note: the US Census treats Hispanic/Latino as an ethnic category. This table excludes Latinos from the racial categories and assigns them to a separate category. Hispanics/Latinos may be of any race.
Race / Ethnicity (NH = Non-Hispanic)	Pop 2020	% 2020
White alone (NH)	402	72.83%
Black or African American alone (NH)	86	15.58%
Native American or Alaska Native alone (NH)	0	0.00%
Asian alone (NH)	6	1.09%
Pacific Islander alone (NH)	1	0.18%
Some Other Race alone (NH)	2	0.36%
Mixed Race or Multi-Racial (NH)	14	2.54%
Hispanic or Latino (any race)	41	7.43%
Total	552	100.00%

At the 2020 census, its population was 552.

== Geography ==
Clyattville is located approximately 6.5 miles south-southwest of Valdosta on Georgia State Route 31 (Madison Highway).

- Georgia State Route 31
- Georgia State Route 376

== Education ==
Residents are in the Lowndes County School District.

Clyattville Elementary School, operated by the school system, is located in the Clyattville area.

Lowndes High School is the zoned comprehensive high school.
