= Valdosta Railway =

Railroad in Georgia

Overview
- Headquarters: Clyattville, Georgia
- Reporting mark: VR
- Locale: Southern Georgia
- Dates of operation: 1992–

Technical
- Track gauge: 4 ft 8 1/2 in (1,435 mm) standard gauge

The Valdosta Railway (reporting mark VR) is a shortline railroad in the U.S. state of Georgia, connecting Clyattville to CSX Transportation and the Norfolk Southern Railway at Valdosta. The company began operations in 1992 as a subsidiary of the Rail Management and Consulting Corporation, and was acquired by Genesee & Wyoming Inc. in 2005.

The line had formerly been operated by the Georgia and Florida Railroad, whose predecessor, the Florida Midland and Georgia Railroad, built the line in the 1880s or 1890s. The Valdosta Southern Railroad (reporting mark VSO) was incorporated in August 1951 and bought the portion from Valdosta south to Madison, Florida, which the G&F planned to abandon. The line was cut back to Clyattville, Georgia in March 1972, and in 1992 the new Valdosta Railway took over operations.

In 2005 the Valdosta Railway was acquired by Genesee & Wyoming. As of 2023, the Valdosta Railway interchanges with CSX and Norfolk Southern in Valdosta, Georgia. G&W owns 14 miles (23 km) miles of track, and can hold up to 286,000 pounds of supplies.

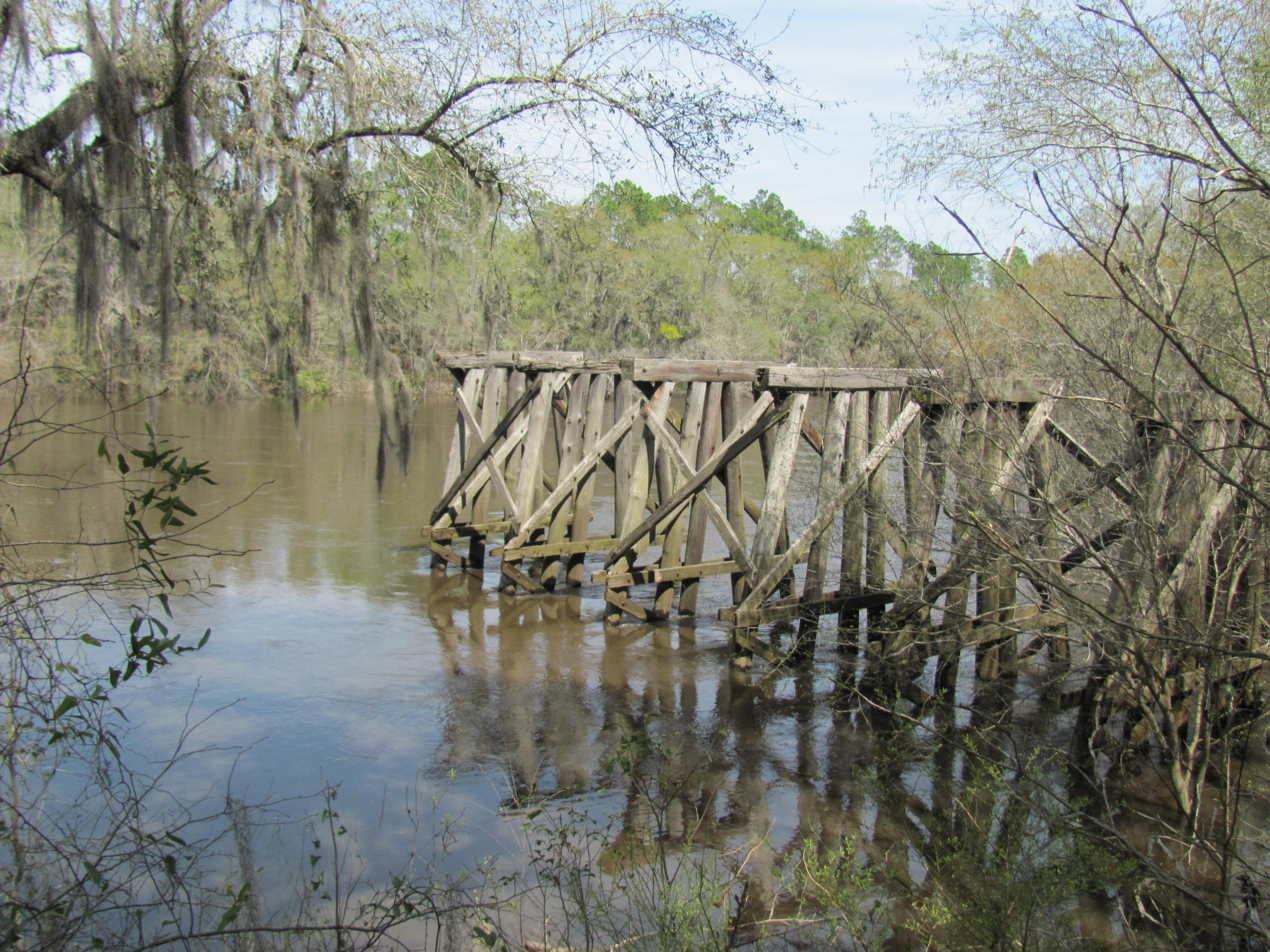
Railroad trestle on the Withlacoochee River.
