= Twin Lakes, Georgia =

- Unincorporated community
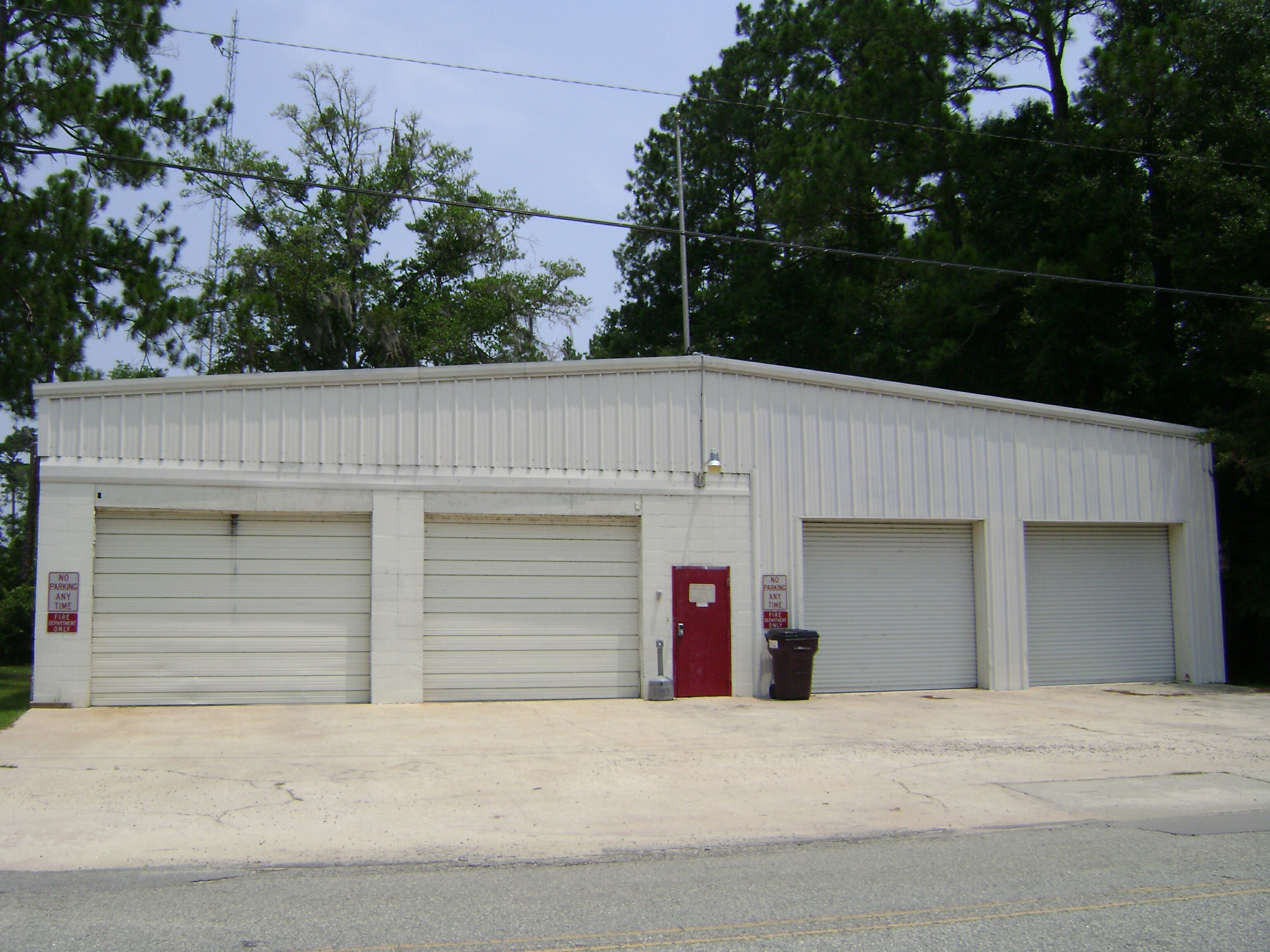
- Twin Lakes Fire Department

- Location within Georgia Location within the United States
- Coordinates: 30°41′46″N 83°12′21″W
- Country: United States
- State: Georgia
- County: Lowndes
- Founded: 1825
- Elevation: 174 ft (53 m)
- Time zone: UTC-5 (Eastern (EST))
  - Summer (DST): UTC-4 (EDT)
- ZIP Code: 31636
- Area code: 229

Twin Lakes is an unincorporated community in Lowndes County, in the U.S. state of Georgia.

== History ==
Twin Lakes was founded in 1825, and named for two natural lakes beside the town site.
