= Indianola, Georgia =

Unincorporated community in Georgia, U.S.

Coordinates: 30°51′52″N 83°11′22″W

Indianola is an unincorporated community in Lowndes County, in the U.S. state of Georgia.

== History ==
A post office called Indianola was established in 1901, and remained in operation until 1915. Indianola was so named for the Native American Indians who once dwelt in the area.
