= Valdosta metropolitan area =

Coordinates: 30°50′N 83°20′W

- Metropolitan statistical area
- Valdosta, GA metropolitan statistical area
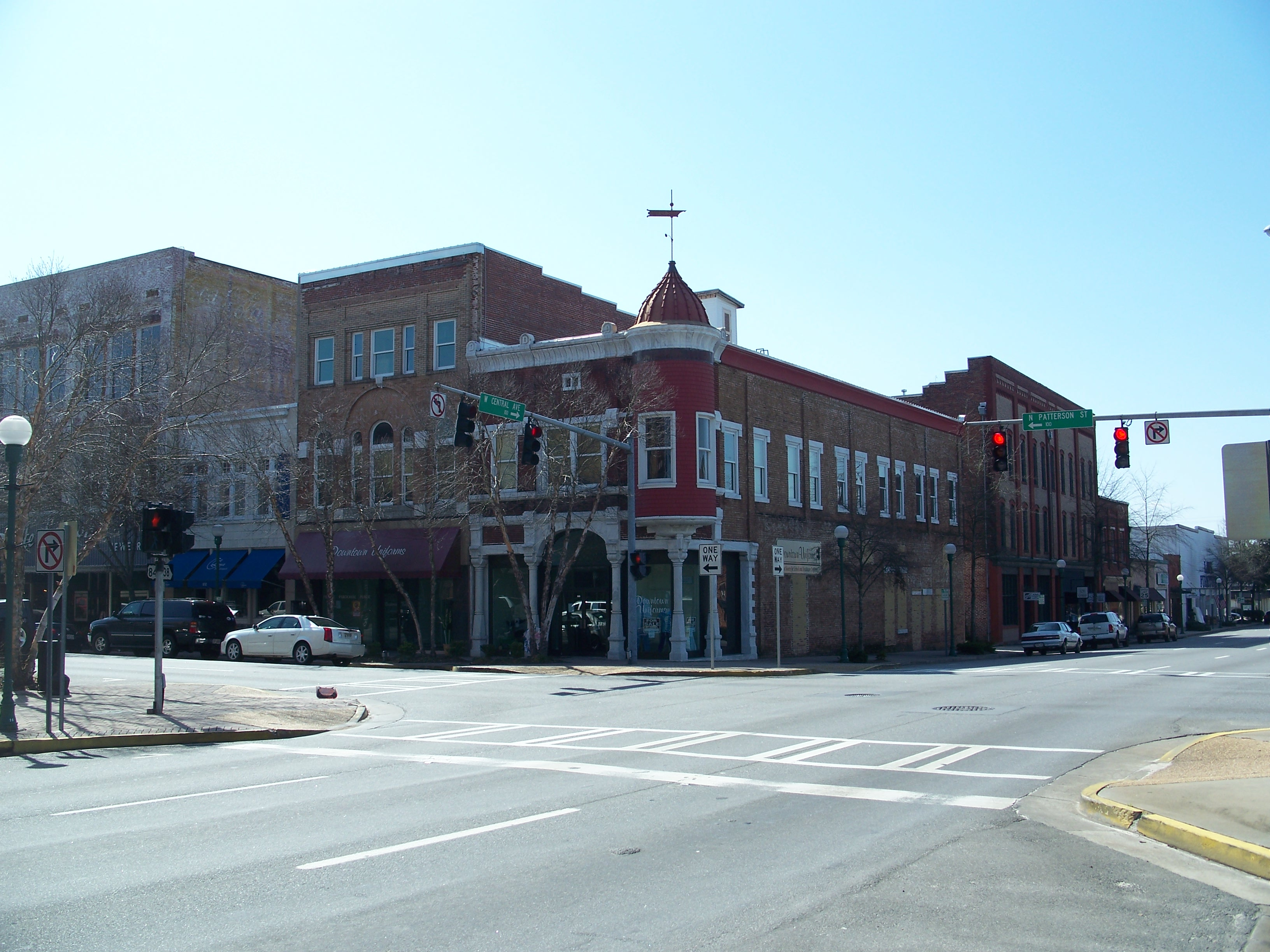
- Valdosta Commercial Historic District
Interactive Map of Valdosta, GA MSA
City of Valdosta
Valdosta, GA MSA
- Country: United States
- State: Georgia
- Largest city: Valdosta

Area
  - Total: 1,607.4 sq mi (4,163 km^{2})

Population (2024)
  - Total: 152,588
  - Density: 94.2/sq mi (36.4/km^{2})
- Time zone: UTC−5 (EST)
  - Summer (DST): UTC−4 (EDT)
- Area code: 229

The Valdosta metropolitan area, designated the Valdosta metropolitan statistical area by the U.S. Office of Management and Budget, is a metropolitan statistical area consisting of four counties—Brooks, Echols, Lanier, and Lowndes—centered on the city of Valdosta. Located in Southeast Georgia, the metropolitan area's population was 152,588 according to 2024 U.S. census estimates, up from 149,849 at the 2020 U.S. census.

== Geography ==
The Valdosta metropolitan area is located within Southeast Georgia, bordering the U.S. state of Florida. For U.S. census purposes, the Valdosta metropolitan area includes four counties: Brooks, Echols, Lanier, and Lowndes. It encompasses a total area of 1,607.4 square miles (4,200 km^{2}).

=== Principal communities ===
==== Places with more than 50,000 inhabitants ====
- Valdosta (principal city)

==== Places with 1,000 to 5,000 inhabitants ====
- Lakeland
- Quitman
- Hahira
- Remerton
- Lake Park
- Moody AFB (census-designated place)

==== Places with fewer than 1,000 inhabitants ====
- Barwick (partial)
- Dasher
- Morven
- Pavo (partial)

==== Unincorporated communities ====
- Barney
- Clyattville
- Dixie
- Grooverville
- Mineola
- Naylor
- Statenville
- Stockton

== Demographics ==
At the 2000 United States census, there were 119,560 people, 42,666 households, and 29,474 families residing in the Valdosta metropolitan area. By the 2024 census estimates, the Valdosta metropolitan area's population increased to 152,588, up from 148,126 according to the 2020 U.S. census.

According to the 2000 U.S. census, the racial makeup of the metropolitan area was 62.42% White, 33.37% African American, 0.40% Native American, 0.98% Asian, 0.04% Pacific Islander, 1.54% from other races, and 1.25% from two or more races. Hispanic or Latino Americans of any race were 3.19% of the population. In 2022, the American Community Survey estimated its racial and ethnic composition was 53% White, 34% African American, 1% Asian, 5% multiracial, and 7% Hispanic or Latino of any race. The increased demographic diversity follows the greater nationwide diversification as of 2020.

In 2024, the median income for a household in the MSA was $51,926, and the median income for a family was $54,581. Males had a median income of $37,038 versus $27,658 for females. the median household income for the Valdosta metropolitan area was $51,926 with a per capita income of $27,935. Approximately 17% of the metropolitan area lived at or below the poverty line, and the median value of an owner-occupied housing unit was $178,500.

== Economy ==
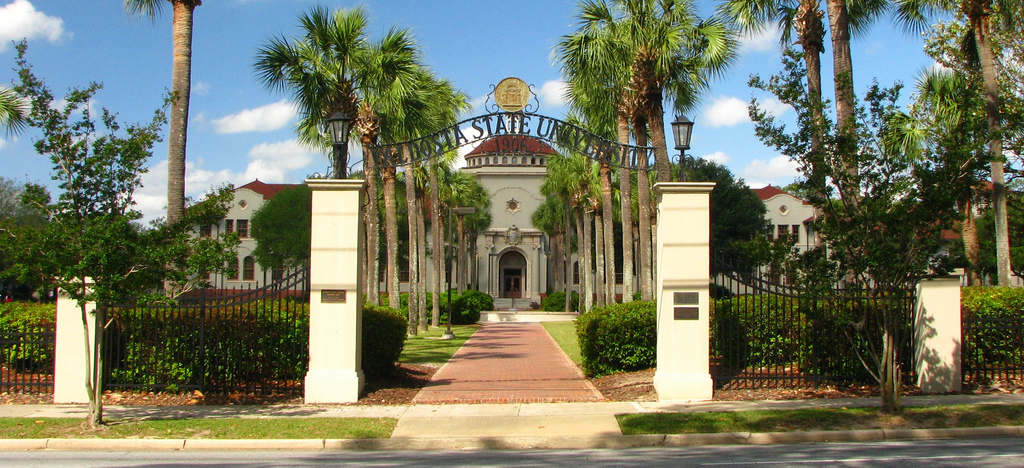
Valdosta State University

The Valdosta metropolitan area forms the economic center of Southeast Georgia. According to the Georgia Department of Economic Development, metropolitan Valdosta and Southeast Georgia's largest industries were the military through the Georgia Air National Guard, and healthcare and education, stimulated by the Mayo Health Clinic System and Valdosta State University. Valdosta State University operates a center of economic development for the region, aiming to increase development within industrial businesses, healthcare, education, arts and athletics. The city of Valdosta hosts Valdosta Mall, the area's regional mall.

== Media ==
The media market of the metropolitan statistical area is centered in the city of Valdosta. Portions of the area also receive television and radio networks from the Tallahassee, Florida media market.

=== Newspaper ===
- The Valdosta Daily Times

=== Radio ===
AM:

- WJEM 1150 AM; 5 kW Gospel
- WVLD 1450 AM; 1 kW Rock (Rock 106.9)
- WGUN 950 AM; 4 kW Adult Urban Contemporary
- WRFV 910 AM; 50 kW

FM:

- WDDQ TALK 92.1 FM Talk radio
- WAYT 88.1 FM Christian Contemporary (licensed to Thomasville)
- WVVS 90.9 FM VSU station
- WWET 91.7 FM (Georgia Public Broadcasting)
- WAAC 92.9 FM Country
- WJYF 95.3 FM Christian Contemporary
- WQPW 95.7 FM Adult Contemporary
- WJEM 96.1 (repeater of 1150 AM)
- WGOV-FM 96.7 FM Urban
- WAFT 101.1 FM Christian
- WXHT 102.7 FM Pop Hits (Broadcast from Valdosta but licensed to Madison, Florida)
- WSTI 105.3 FM Classic Soul and R&B (Broadcast from Valdosta but licensed to Quitman)
- W295AO 106.9 Rock (repeater of WVLD 1450AM)
- WWRQ 107.9 FM The Beat

=== Television ===
- WSWG channel 44 is the local CBS affiliate licensed to Valdosta and based in Moultrie. The station serves the Valdosta and Albany areas, and includes subchannels offering programming from MyNetworkTV and Me-TV.
- WXGA-TV channel 8 is the local GPB outlet, licensed to Waycross.

== Transportation ==
=== Highways ===
There are many signed highways in the area, including the one interstate highway system, five U.S. routes, and 15 state routes:

- Interstate 75
- U.S. Route 41 (North Valdosta Road) (co-signed with I-75 between Exits 22 and 60)
- U.S. Route 84 (Hill Avenue (Valdosta), Wiregrass Parkway)
- U.S. Route 129
- U.S. Route 221 (co-signed with US 84)
- U.S. Route 441
- State Route 7 (co-signed with US 41) (Used to be Ashley St(NB)and Patterson St(SB), now they are ALT SR7)
- State Route 11
- State Route 31
- State Route 37
- State Route 64
- State Route 76
- State Route 89
- State Route 94
- State Route 122 (Main Street (Hahira, Lakeland))
- State Route 125 (Bemiss Road (Lowndes County))
- State Route 133 (Billy Langdale Parkway, St. Augustine Road (Valdosta))
- State Route 135
- State Route 187
- State Route 333 (Moultrie Road (Brooks County))
- State Route 376

=== Airports ===
There are two airports in the area, which also provide service to the Southeast Georgia region:

- Quitman Brooks County Airport (4J5) (general aviation)
- Valdosta Regional Airport (VLD, KVLD) (commercial service to Hartsfield-Jackson Atlanta International Airport)

== See also ==
- Georgia statistical areas
- List of municipalities in Georgia (U.S. state)
