= WGOV =

WGOV may refer to:

- WGOV-FM, a radio station (96.7 FM) licensed to serve Valdosta, Georgia, United States
- WGUN, a radio station (950 AM) licensed to serve Valdosta, Georgia, which held the call sign WGOV until 2013
