= WJHC =

WJHC may refer to:

- IIHF World U20 Championship, known as the World Junior Hockey Championships
- Western Jewish History Center, a library and a large collection of archival material of the Jewish community of the Western United States
- WJHC (FM), a radio station (107.5 FM) licensed to serve Jasper, Florida, United States
