= WLGA =

WLGA may refer to:

== Broadcast stations ==
- WLGA (FM), a radio station in Columbus, Georgia, United States; see List of K-Love stations
- WHOT-TV, a television station in Opelika, Alabama, United States, that used the call sign WLGA from 2005 to 2020
- WQPW, a radio station in Valdosta, Georgia, United States, that used the call signs WLGA-FM and WLGA from 1977 to 1988

== Other uses ==
- Welsh Local Government Association
