= WVGA =

WVGA may refer to:

- Wide VGA, 800×480 graphics display resolution
- WVGA (FM), a radio station (105.9 FM) licensed to Lakeland, Georgia, United States
- WSWG (TV), a television station (channel 43) licensed to Valdosta, Georgia, United States, which held the call sign WVGA from April 1979 to May 1994
