= WKAA =

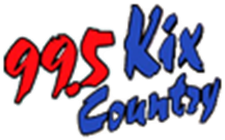
- Willacoochee, Georgia; United States
- Broadcast area: Valdosta, Georgia
- Frequency: 99.5 MHz
- Branding: 99.5 Kix Country

Programming
- Format: Country music
- Affiliations: Motor Racing Network

Ownership
- Owner: Black Crow Media; (RTG Radio, LLC)
- Sister stations: WQPW, WSTI-FM, WVGA, WVLD, WWRQ-FM, WXHT

History
- Former call signs: WDMG-FM (1978–2004)

Technical information
- Licensing authority: FCC
- Facility ID: 71343
- Class: C1
- ERP: 73,000 watts
- HAAT: 229.7 meters (754 ft)
- Transmitter coordinates: 31°10′18.00″N 83°21′57.00″W

Links
- Public license information: Public file; LMS
- Webcast: Listen Live
- Website: mykixcountry.com

WKAA (99.5 FM) better known as "99.5 Kix Country" is a radio station broadcasting a country music format. Licensed to Willacoochee, Georgia, United States, the station serves the Valdosta, Georgia area. The station is currently owned by Black Crow Media.

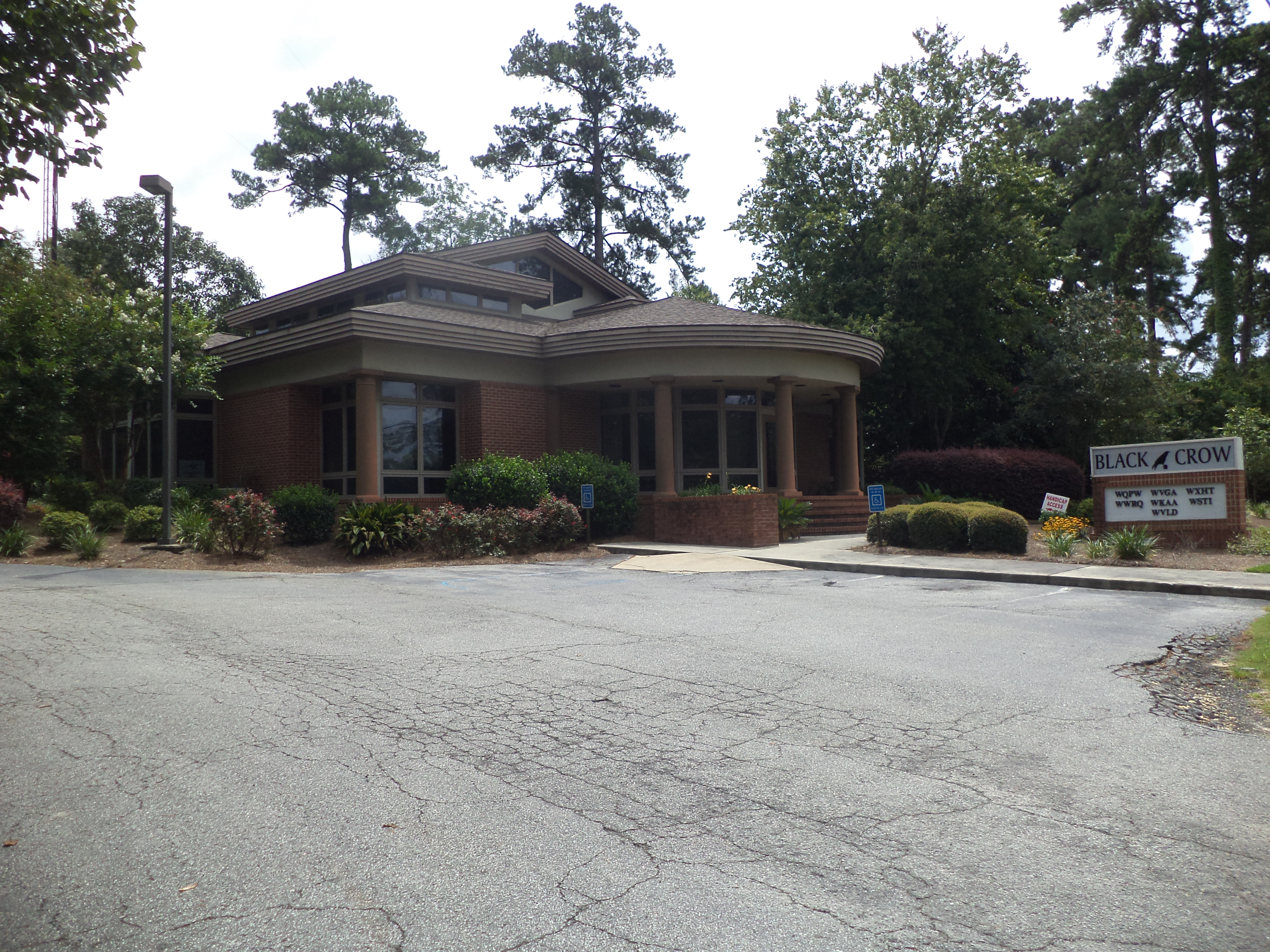
Black Crown Media Studios

== History ==
The station went on the air as WDMG-FM on March 6, 1978. On September 10, 2004, the station changed its call sign to the current WKAA.
