= Southeast Georgia =

18-county region in Georgia, US

Coordinates: 31°0′N 82°40′W

- Region
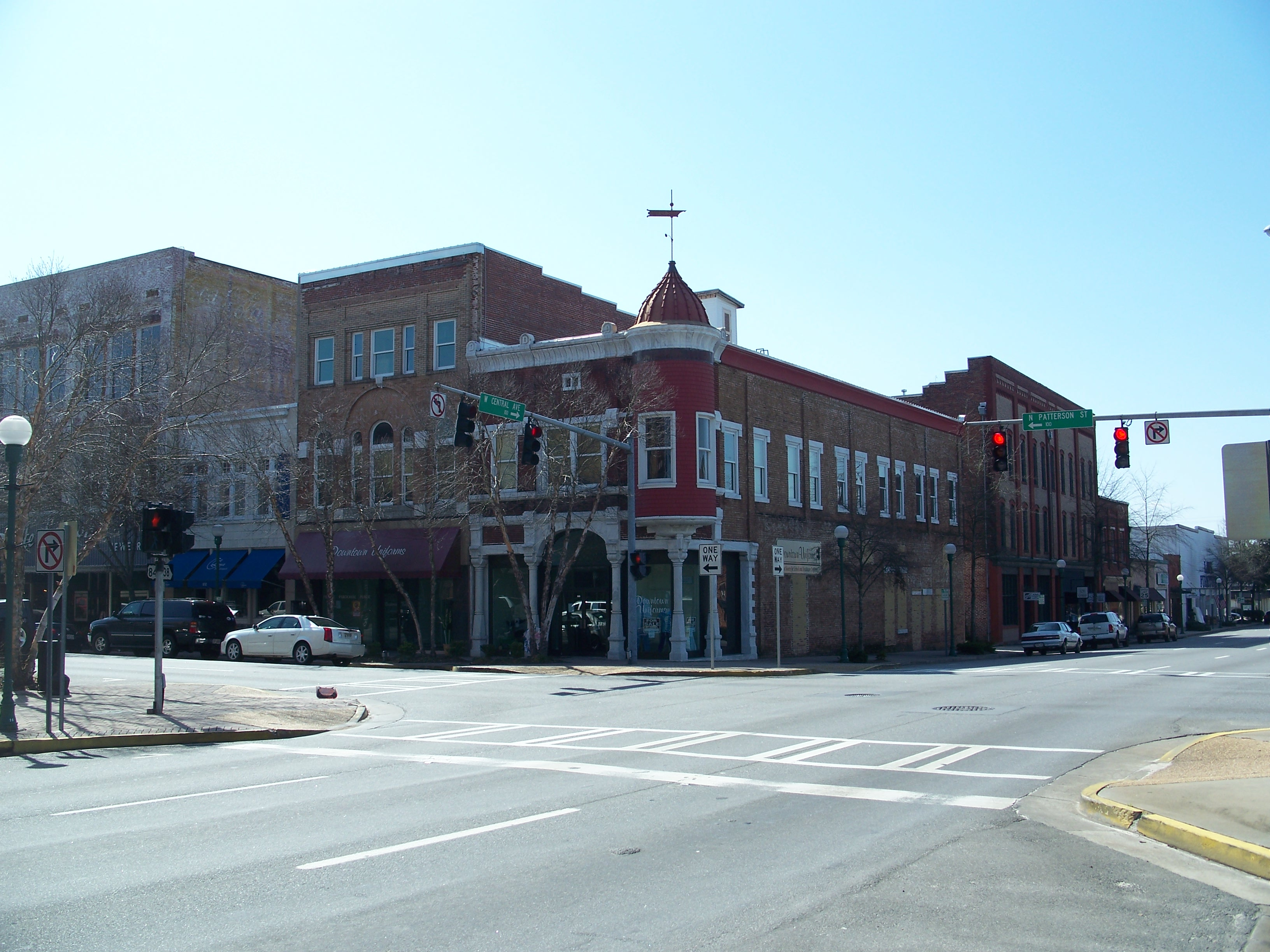
- Valdosta Commercial Historic District

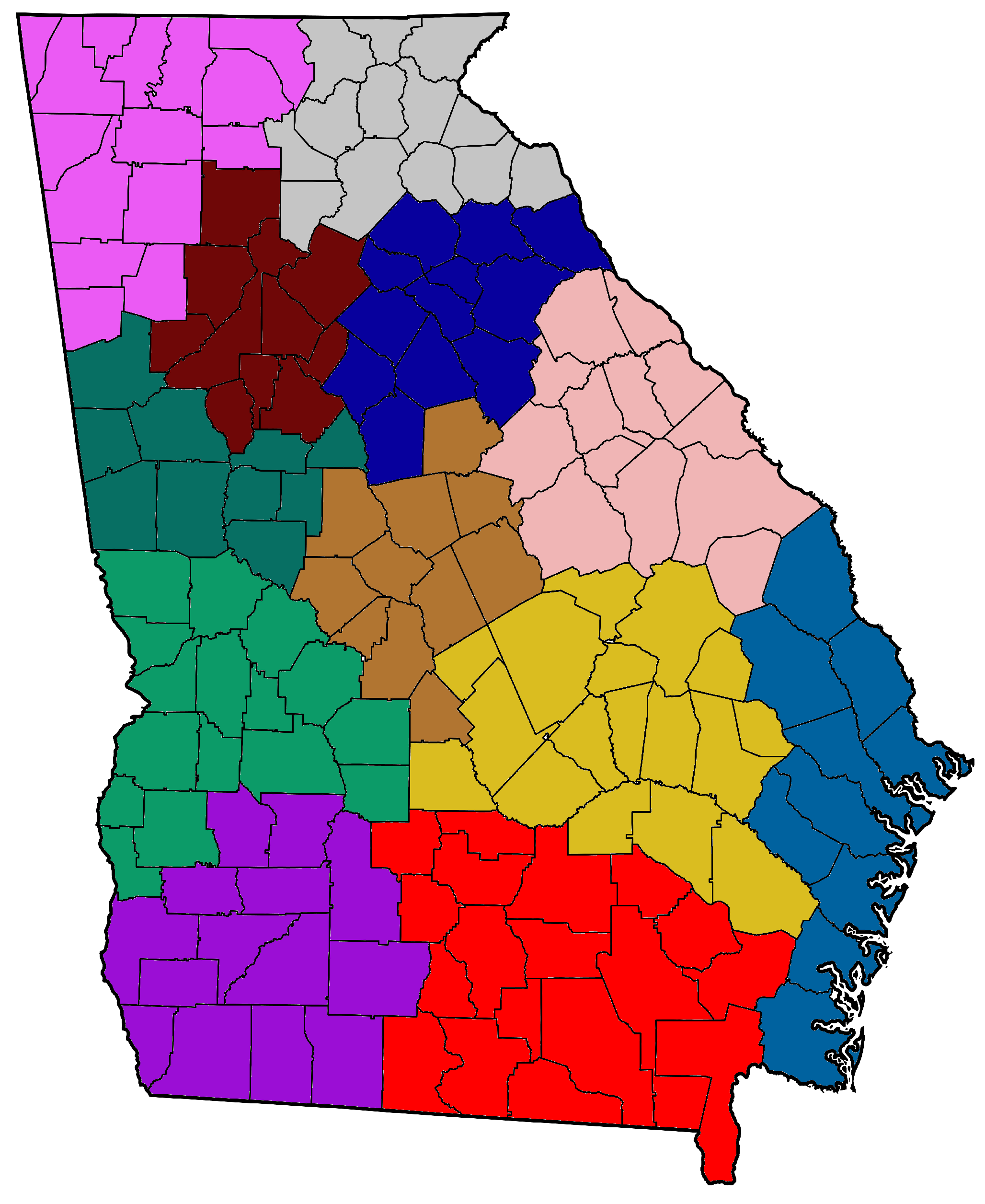
- Southeast Georgia highlighted in red

- Location of Georgia within the United States
- Country: United States
- State: Georgia
- Largest cities: Valdosta; Tifton; Waycross; Douglas; Fitzgerald

Population (2020)
  - Total: 416,498
- Demonym: Southeast Georgian
- Website: georgia.org/regions/southeast-georgia

Southeast Georgia is an eighteen-county region within the U.S. state of Georgia, bordering Florida. The region includes a portion of Georgia's Lower Coastal Plain. Southeast Georgia's largest city is Valdosta, which forms the core of the Valdosta metropolitan area. The region's largest county by population is Lowndes County, of which Valdosta is the county seat. The region had a total resident population of 416,498 in 2020.

== Geography ==
Located in southern Georgia and the Deep South, the Southeast Georgia region lies on a low elevation above sea level, and a portion of its land consists of the Okefenokee Swamp. According to the Georgia Department of Economic Development, Southeast Georgia consists of the following counties: Atkinson, Bacon, Ben Hill, Berrien, Brantley, Brooks, Charlton, Clinch, Coffee, Cook, Echols, Irwin, Lanier, Lowndes, Pierce, Tift, Turner, and Ware.

== Demographics ==
Southeast Georgia, like the majority of the U.S. state, has been settled by a predominantly non-Hispanic white and Black or African American population since its colonial history. Among its regional population, the counties making up the region had a resident population of 416,498 as of the 2020 United States census. To its west, Southwest Georgia has remained predominantly African American, forming part of the Black Belt in the American South.

As a part of the Bible Belt, Christianity is Southeast Georgia's most practiced religion, with Protestantism being the largest form of Christianity by affiliation. According to the Association of Religion Data Archives, the region's single largest Christian denomination was the Southern Baptist Convention, with 97,452 adherents. Overall, the Baptist tradition is the region's largest Protestant group, with the National Missionary Baptist Convention of America and National Baptist Convention of the United States of America being the second and third-largest Baptist denominations. Non/interdenominational Protestants formed the second-largest overall group with 25,080 adherents. Other prominent Protestant Christian groups in the region have included Methodists and Pentecostals.

The Catholic Church is the largest non-Protestant Christian denomination in Southeast Georgia. During European colonization of the Americas, Spanish Catholics established missions throughout present-day regions of Southeast and Coastal Georgia.

According to the same 2020 study, the largest non-Christian religions by adherence in the region were Buddhism, Islam, and the Baha'i Faith. Theravada Buddhism is the dominant Buddhist school by affiliation, with 1,296 adherents in Southeast Georgia.

== Economy ==
According to the Georgia Department of Economic Development, Southeast Georgia's largest industries were the military through Georgia Air National Guard, and healthcare and education, stimulated by the Mayo Health Clinic System and Valdosta State University. Valdosta State University operates a center of economic development for the region, aiming to increase development within industrial businesses, healthcare, education, arts and athletics.

== Transportation ==
The region is served by one interstate and several U.S. route highways; it is also served by the Valdosta Regional Airport which provides services by Delta to Atlanta.

- Interstate 75
- U.S. Route 41
- U.S. Route 82
- U.S. Route 84
- U.S. Route 221
- U.S. Route 441
