= WSFB =

Simulcast of WDDQ, Adel
- Quitman, Georgia; United States
- Frequency: 1490 kHz
- Branding: Talk 92.1

Programming
- Format: Talk
- Affiliations: Compass Media Networks; Premiere Networks; Salem Radio Network; Townhall; Westwood One

Ownership
- Owner: Smalltown Broadcasting, LLC; (Scott Matheson)
- Sister stations: WDDQ, WJEM, WJHC

History
- First air date: 1955

Technical information
- Licensing authority: FCC
- Facility ID: 54347
- Class: C
- Power: 1,000 watts unlimited
- Transmitter coordinates: 30°46′51.00″N 83°34′30.00″W
- Translator: 99.1 W256DB (Quitman)

Links
- Public license information: Public file; LMS
- Website: talk921.com

WSFB (1490 AM) is a radio station broadcasting a talk format, simulcasting WDDQ 92.1 FM Adel, Georgia. Licensed to Quitman, Georgia, United States. The station is currently owned by Scott Matheson.

Former logo
