= WAFT =

Coordinates: 30°51′42″N 83°23′48″W

- Valdosta, Georgia; United States
- Broadcast area: Valdosta, Georgia; Moultrie, Georgia; Thomasville, Georgia
- Frequency: 101.1 MHz

Programming
- Format: Christian

Ownership
- Owner: Christian Radio Fellowship, Inc.

History
- First air date: November 25, 1971

Technical information
- Licensing authority: FCC
- Facility ID: 11091
- Class: C1
- ERP: 100,000 watts
- HAAT: 170 meters (560 ft)

Links
- Public license information: Public file; LMS
- Webcast: Listen live
- Website: waft.org

WAFT is a Christian radio station licensed to Valdosta, Georgia, broadcasting on 101.1 FM. The station serves the areas of Valdosta, Georgia, Thomasville, Georgia, and Moultrie, Georgia, as well as Jefferson, Madison, and Hamilton Counties in Florida. WAFT is owned by Christian Radio Fellowship, Inc.

WAFT airs a variety of Christian Talk and Teaching programs as well as Christian music.
