= WVGA (FM) =

- Lakeland, Georgia; United States
- Broadcast area: Valdosta area
- Frequency: 105.9 MHz
- Branding: NewsTalk 105.9

Programming
- Format: Talk radio
- Affiliations: Fox News Radio; Premiere Networks; Westwood One

Ownership
- Owner: Black Crow Media
- Sister stations: WKAA, WQPW, WSTI-FM, WVLD, WWRQ-FM, WXHT

History
- Former call signs: WHFE (1989–1999)
- Call sign meaning: Valdosta, GA

Technical information
- Licensing authority: FCC
- Facility ID: 36379
- Class: C3
- ERP: 10,000 watts
- HAAT: 100.0 meters (328.1 ft)
- Transmitter coordinates: 31°3′21.00″N 83°13′54.00″W

Links
- Public license information: Public file; LMS
- Webcast: Listen Live
- Website: valdostatoday.com/wvga/

WVGA (105.9 MHz), better known as "Newstalk 105.9", is an American FM talk radio station, licensed to Lakeland, Georgia, and serving the Valdosta, Georgia area from Black Crow Media Studios. It began as WHFE on November 29, 1989, and kept that call sign until July 9, 1999.

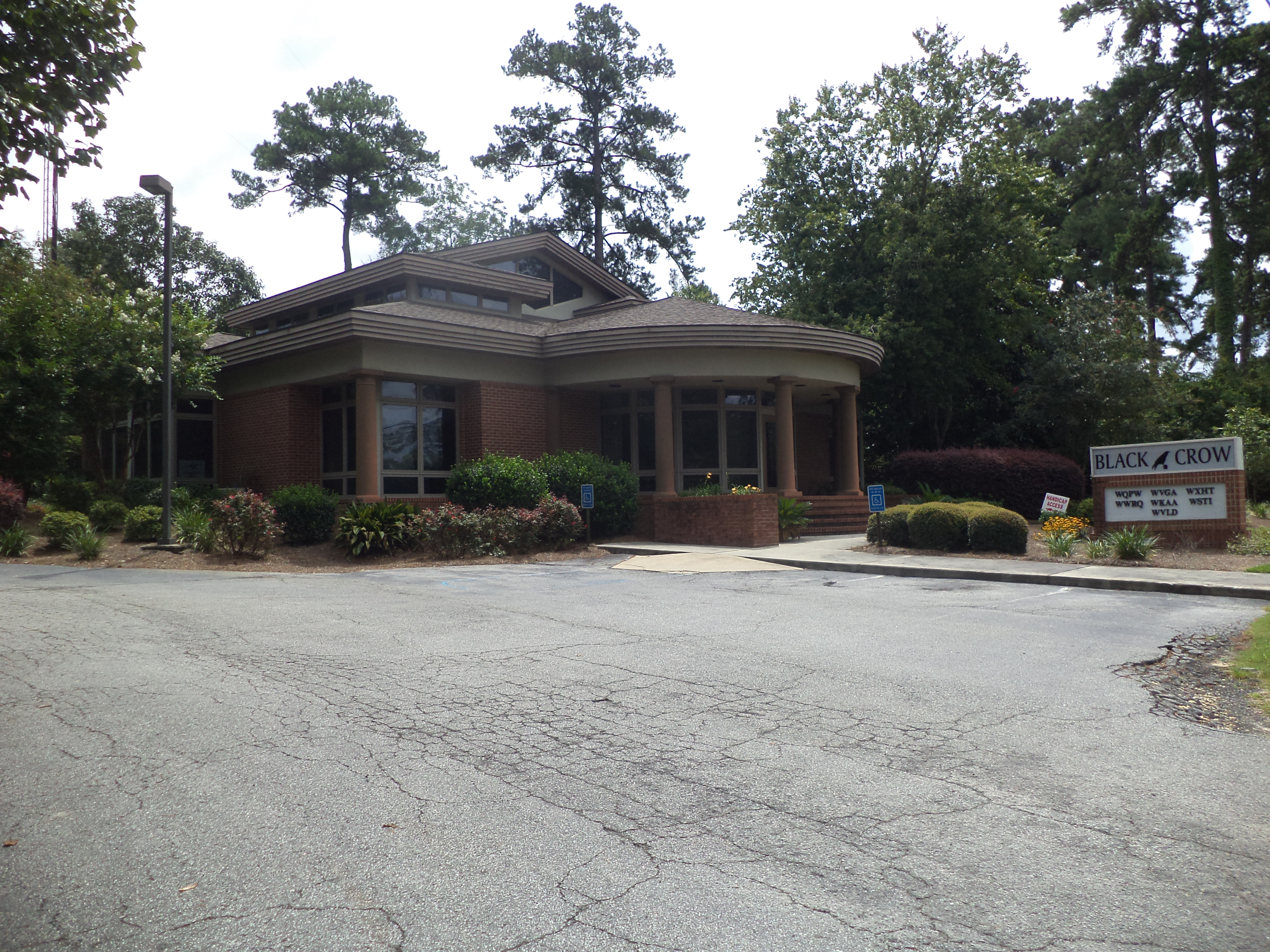
Black Crow Media Studios
