= Valdosta, Georgia =

- City
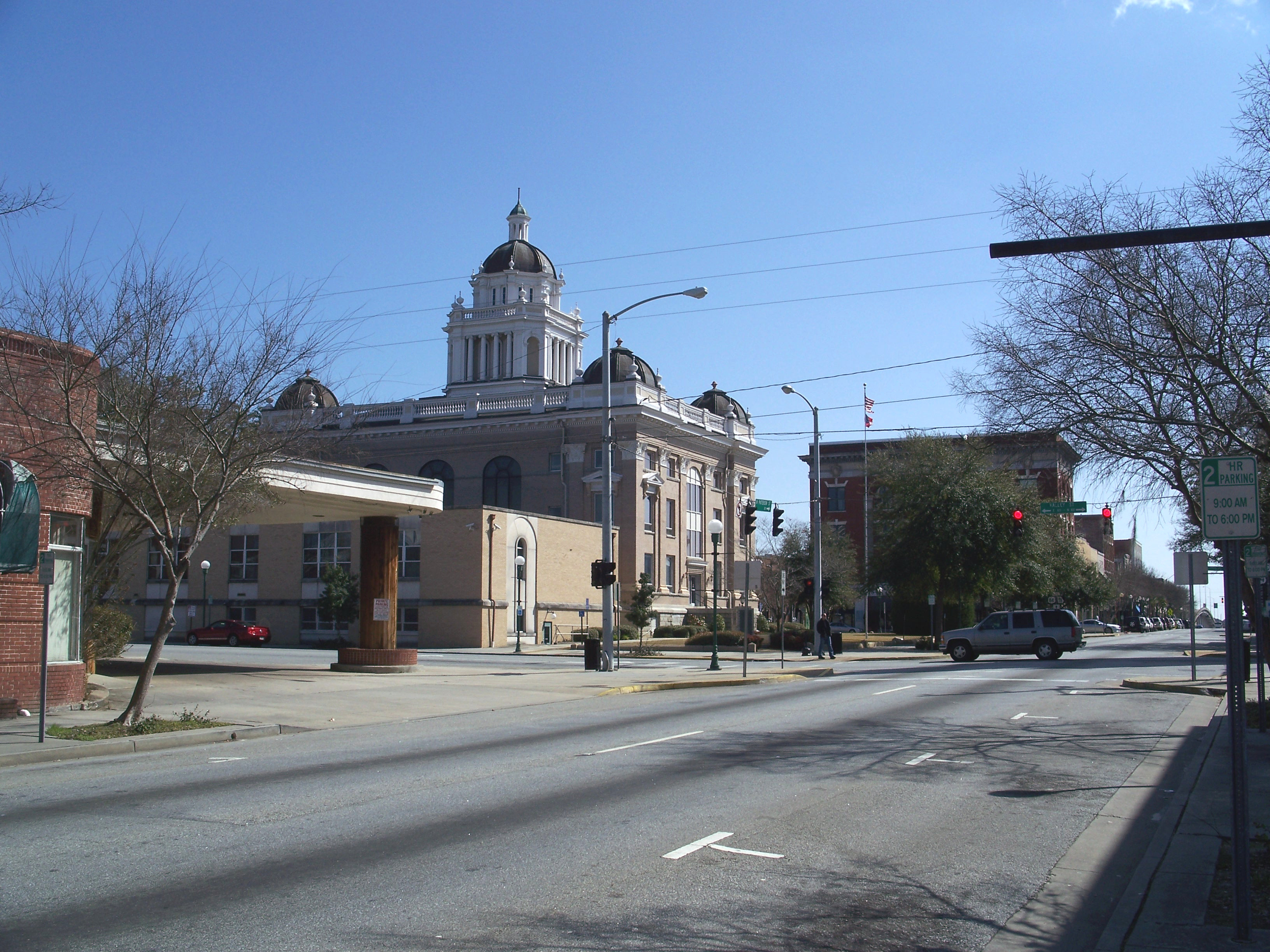
- Valdosta Commercial Historic District

- Flag Seal
- Nicknames: Azalea City, Sportstown, Titletown USA, Winnersville
- Motto: "A City Without Limits" (2002–present)
- Location in Lowndes County and the state of Georgia
- Coordinates: 30°50′48″N 83°16′59″W
- Country: United States
- State: Georgia
- County: Lowndes
- Incorporated: December 7, 1860

Government
  - Mayor: Scott James Matheson

Area
  - City: 36.43 sq mi (94.35 km^{2})
  - Land: 35.98 sq mi (93.20 km^{2})
  - Water: 0.44 sq mi (1.15 km^{2})
- Elevation: 220 ft (67 m)

Population (2020)
  - City: 55,378 (20th largest)
  - Density: 1,538.9/sq mi (594.16/km^{2})
  - Metro: 152,588
- Time zone: UTC−05:00 (EST)
  - Summer (DST): UTC−04:00 (EDT)
- ZIP Codes: 31601–31606, 31698
- Area code: 229
- FIPS code: 13-78800
- GNIS feature ID: 0324649
- Website: valdostacity.com

Valdosta is a city in and the county seat of Lowndes County in the U.S. state of Georgia. As the principal city of the Valdosta metropolitan statistical area, which in 2023 had a metropolitan population of 151,118, according to the US Census Bureau its metropolitan area includes Brooks County to the west. With a city population of 55,378 in 2020, Valdosta is the home of Valdosta State University, a regional university in the University System of Georgia with over 12,000 students as of 2021.

== Etymology ==
The city of Valdosta had been named after Governor George Troup, for whom Troup County, Georgia, was also named. Valdosta was named after Troup's plantation, Valdosta (occasionally the "Val d'Osta" spelling was used for the plantation); Troup had named it after the Aosta Valley (Piedmontese: Val d'Osta) in Italy. The name Aosta (Latin: Augusta Praetoria Salassorum) refers to Emperor Augustus.

== History ==
=== Incorporation ===
Valdosta was incorporated on December 7, 1860, when it was designated by the state legislature as the new county seat, formerly at nearby Troupville. The railroad was built to Valdosta that year, rather than Troupville, stimulating development in the new county seat. Many citizens of Troupville had already relocated to Valdosta when the Atlantic and Gulf Railroad was built 4 miles (6 km) away. The engine known as Satilla No. 3 pulled the first train into Valdosta on the Atlantic and Gulf Railroad on either July 4, 1860, or July 20, 1860.

=== Civil War to Reconstruction ===
The American Civil War began the year after the establishment of Valdosta. During the war, many of its male residents served in the Confederate States Army. Three years after the beginning of the war, women rioted in the city after the refusal of Confederate dollars as legal tender.

During the Reconstruction era, more than 100 freedmen, families of farmers, craftsmen, and laborers, emigrated from Lowndes County to Arthington, Liberia, in 1871 and 1872, looking for a better life. Since before the war, the American Colonization Society had supported the relocation of free blacks to Liberia, an American colony in West Africa established for this purpose. The first group from Lowndes County left in 1871, and were led by Jefferson Bracewell; the second group was led in 1872 by Aaron Miller.

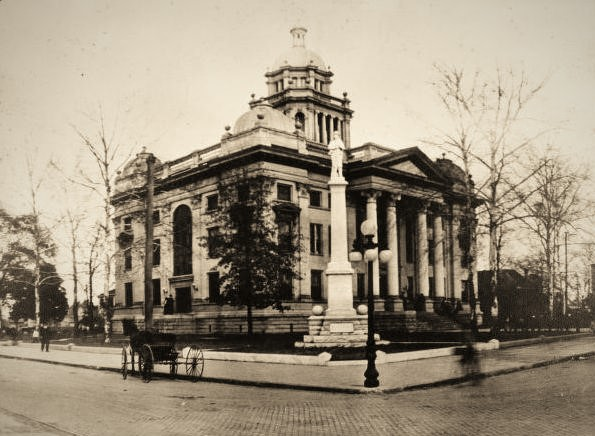
Lowndes County Courthouse and Confederate Monument c. 1915

One notable event during Reconstruction was at a political meeting in front of the courthouse. A carpetbagger named J. W. Clift was running for United States Congress and was looking for support from former slaves. During Clift's speech he verbally attacked whites of Valdosta. In response five men planted explosives at the courthouse, planning on setting them off at Clift's next political rally. When other whites arrived at the courthouse unaware of the explosives the five men decided to stop the explosives but some still managed to go off. The explosion was small and no injuries occurred. The five men were arrested and were going to go on trial, but federal soldiers took them to Savannah for trial, which was seen by residents as an overreach of authority and an endangerment for self-government.

As mechanization was introduced, the number of agricultural jobs decreased and Valdosta became more industrialized by the 20th century. The world's second Coca-Cola bottling plant began bottling Coca-Cola in Valdosta in 1897. In 1899, the cotton mill town of Remerton was established 2 miles (3 km) from the center of Valdosta.

=== First half of the 20th century ===
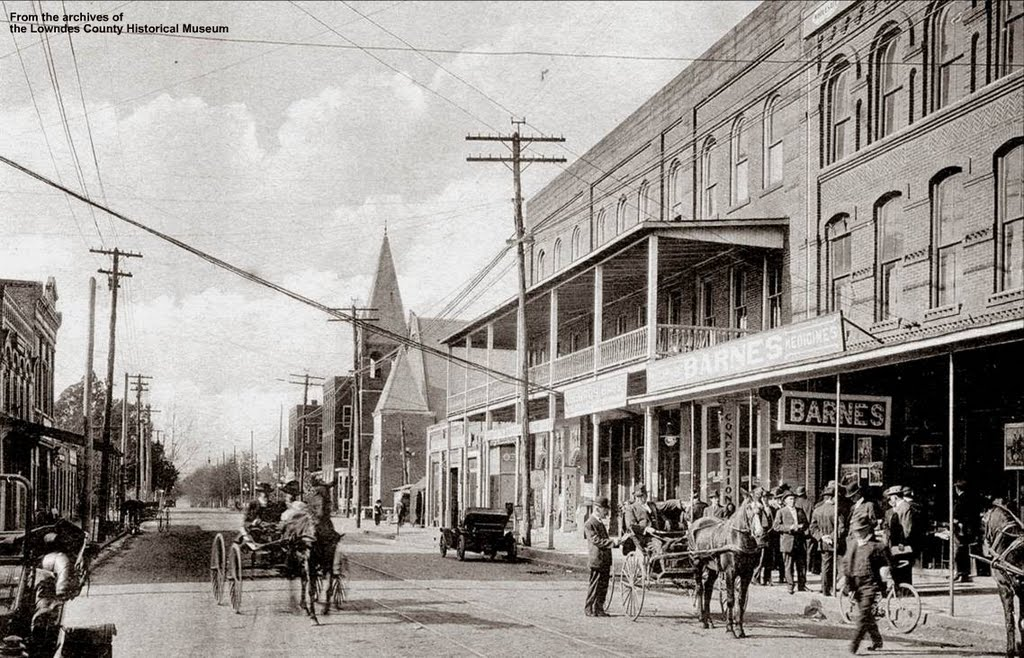
Downtown Valdosta c. 1900

A new courthouse was planned in 1900 to replace the smaller courthouse. Construction began in 1904 for around $75,000. The old courthouse was torn down in March 1904. The new courthouse was completed in 1904, and on April 14, 1905, the first session of court took place in the new courthouse.

In November 1902, the Harris Nickel-Plate Circus' prize elephant, Gypsy, went on a rampage and killed her trainer James O'Rourke. After terrorizing the town for a couple of hours, she ran off to Cherry Creek, north of Valdosta. Gypsy was chased by Police Chief Calvin Dampier and a posse. Gypsy was shot and killed and buried on site. James O'Rourke was buried in Sunset Hill Cemetery in Valdosta.

On July 28, 1907, Valdosta voted to become a dry city; a record $10,000 worth of whiskey was sold on the last day. The city had been wet since its founding.

In 1910, cotton was still important to the economy, and Fortune magazine ranked Valdosta as the richest city in America by per capita income. Soon after that, the boll weevil invaded the South, moving east through the states and killing much of the cotton crop in this area in 1917. Agriculture in this area turned to tobacco and pine timber. In January 1913, the South Georgia State Normal College opened in Valdosta on the edge of town. Over the course of the following century, it evolved into Valdosta State University.

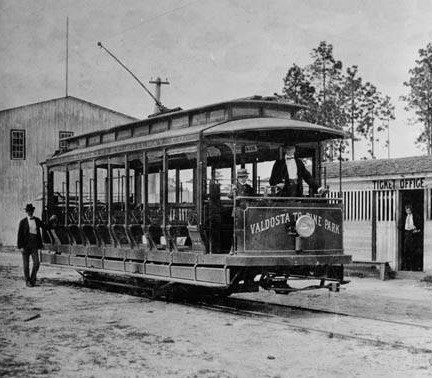
Valdosta streetcar in 1912

On May 16, 1918, a white planter named Hampton Smith was shot and killed at his house near Morven, Georgia, by a black farm worker named Sidney Johnson who was routinely mistreated by Smith. Johnson also shot Smith's wife but she later recovered. Johnson hid for several days in Valdosta without discovery. Lynch mobs formed in Valdosta ransacking Lowndes and Brooks counties for a week looking for Johnson and his alleged accomplices. These mobs lynched at least 13 African Americans, among them Mary Turner and her unborn eight-month-old baby who was cut from her body and murdered. Mary Turner's husband Hazel Turner was also lynched the day before.

Sidney Johnson was turned in by an acquaintance, and on May 22 Police Chief Calvin Dampier led a shootout at the Valdosta house where he was hiding. Following his death, a crowd of more than 700 castrated Johnson's body, then dragged it behind a vehicle down Patterson Street and all the way to Morven, Georgia, near the site of Smith's murder. There the body of Johnson was hanged and burned on a tree. That afternoon, Governor Hugh Dorsey ordered the state militia to be dispatched to Valdosta to halt the lynch mobs, but they arrived too late for many victims. Dorsey later denounced the lynchings, but none of the participants were ever prosecuted.

Following the violence, more than 500 African Americans fled from Lowndes and Brooks counties to escape such oppressive conditions and violence. From 1880 to 1930, Brooks County had the highest number of lynchings in the state of Georgia. By 1922 local chapters of the Ku Klux Klan, which had been revived starting in 1915, were holding rallies openly in Valdosta.

=== Second half of the 20th century ===
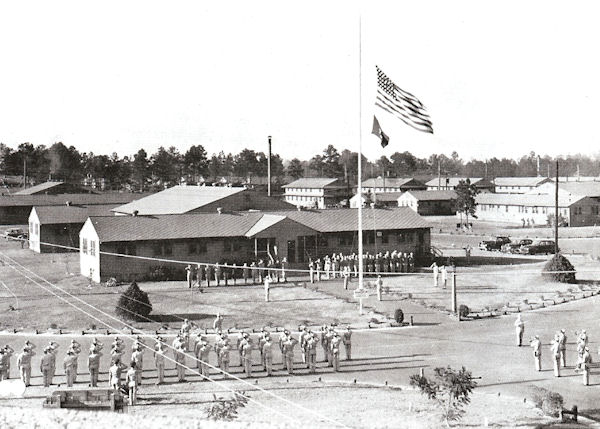
Moody Air Force Base in 1943

On June 26, 1941, Moody Army Airfield opened 10 miles (16 km) northeast of town as part of the United States' preparation for the country's potential involvement in World War II.

The local economy received an important boost in the mid-20th century when Interstate 75 was routed and built through the area. Many vacationers on their way to Florida found Valdosta a convenient "last stop" on their way to Walt Disney World and the Orlando area. The Interstate's route to the west of the city has contributed to its commercial district shifting from the historic downtown area to near the Interstate.

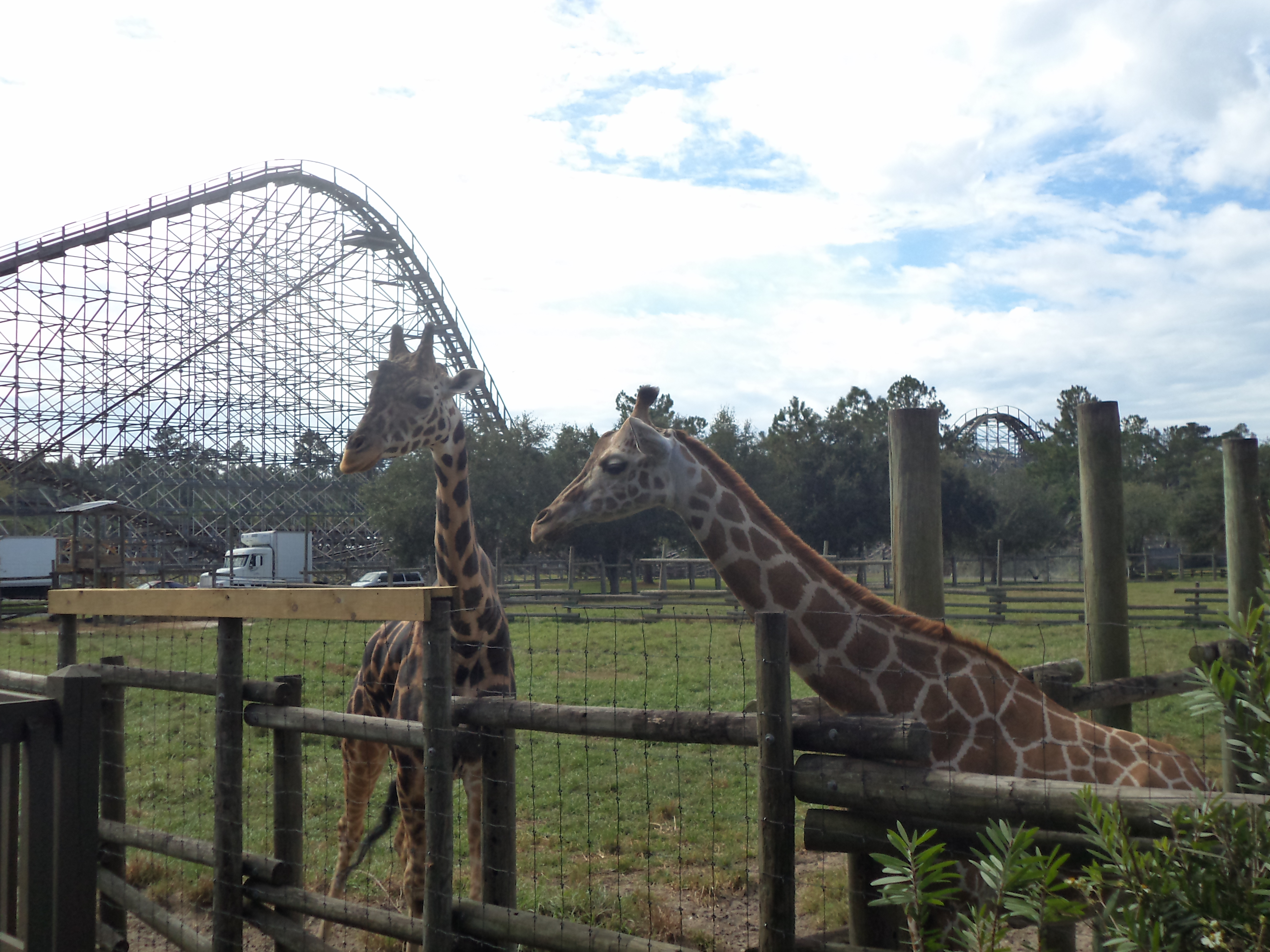
Cheetah roller coaster and giraffes at Wild Adventures

Valdosta State College was integrated in September 1963. In 1969, Valdosta High School (the formerly all-white school) and Pinevale High School (the formerly all-black school) were merged into one system; integration had begun at Valdosta High School about 1966.

During the Vietnam War, future president George W. Bush entered the National Guard, receiving flight training at Valdosta's Moody Air Force Base in November 1968.

In 1994, Kent and Dawn Buescher opened Liberty Farms Animal Park with a playground, entertainment venue and a collection of animals. An amusement park was added, and in 1996 Liberty Farms Animal Park was renamed Wild Adventures. Wild Adventures expanded with Splash Island Water Park in 2002. The Buescher family purchased a botanical garden and theme park called Cypress Gardens in 2004. Due to damage from three hurricanes and a financial struggle in repairing Cypress Gardens, the Buescher family were forced to sell Wild Adventures to Herschend Family Entertainment in 2007.

According to the Bureau of Labor Statistics' Monthly Labor Review, the first automated teller machine (ATM) was installed at a C&S Bank in Valdosta in 1971. That ATM was preceded by one installed in Rockville Centre, New York, in 1969.

== Geography ==
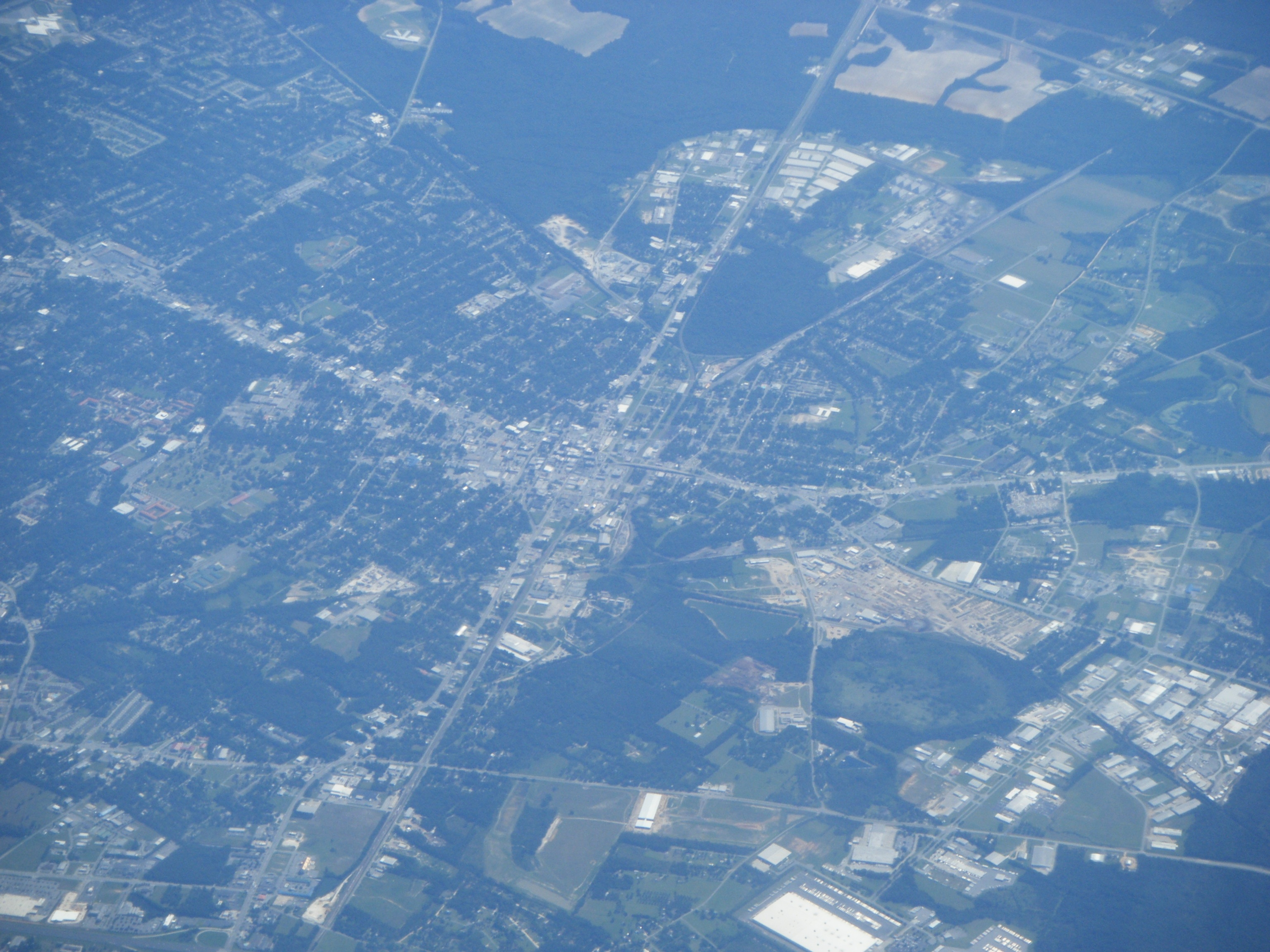
Aerial view of Valdosta

Valdosta is located in central Lowndes County at 30°50′48″N 83°16′59″W (30.846661, −83.283101), 15 miles (24 km) north of the Florida state line. It is about 230 miles (370 km) south of Atlanta, 138 miles (222 km) east of Dothan, Alabama, 120 miles (190 km) northwest of Jacksonville, Florida, and 71 miles (114 km) northeast of Tallahassee. Regionally, Valdosta is considered part of Southeast Georgia, a region bordering Coastal Georgia, South Georgia, and Southwest Georgia.

According to the United States Census Bureau, the city has a total area of 36.4 square miles (94.3 km^{2}), of which 35.9 square miles (93.1 km^{2}) are land and 0.46 square miles (1.2 km^{2}), or 1.26%, are water. The Withlacoochee River, a tributary of the Suwannee River, runs along part of the western edge of the city, while the eastern side of the city drains to Mud Creek, flowing southeast to the Alapahoochee River, also part of the Suwannee River watershed.

=== Climate ===
Valdosta has a humid subtropical climate (Köppen climate classification: Cfa), with mild, dry/wet winters and hot, humid summers. Temperatures frequently go over 90 °F (32.2 °C), but in extreme heatwaves, temperatures occasionally go over 100 °F (37.8 °C). Snowfall is rare but not unknown. Snow fell in Valdosta most recently on January 22, 2025, but the last significant snowfall happened in 1989. However, light frosts regularly occur between December and February. Valdosta can experience Indian summers in the winter, where temperatures can get quite warm. Very rarely do winter lows go below 25 °F (−3.9 °C). As of 2023, Valdosta is in the USDA hardiness zone 9a.

Climate data for Valdosta, Georgia (Valdosta Regional Airport) 1991–2020 normals, extremes 1948–present
Month	Jan	Feb	Mar	Apr	May	Jun	Jul	Aug	Sep	Oct	Nov	Dec	Year
Record high °F (°C)	84 (29)	88 (31)	95 (35)	96 (36)	100 (38)	106 (41)	104 (40)	106 (41)	101 (38)	96 (36)	89 (32)	85 (29)	106 (41)
Mean maximum °F (°C)	78.7 (25.9)	81.5 (27.5)	86.1 (30.1)	89.8 (32.1)	94.7 (34.8)	98.0 (36.7)	98.5 (36.9)	98.3 (36.8)	95.2 (35.1)	90.0 (32.2)	84.5 (29.2)	80.4 (26.9)	99.8 (37.7)
Mean daily maximum °F (°C)	62.8 (17.1)	67.0 (19.4)	72.9 (22.7)	79.6 (26.4)	86.4 (30.2)	90.1 (32.3)	92.1 (33.4)	91.5 (33.1)	87.8 (31.0)	80.5 (26.9)	71.4 (21.9)	65.0 (18.3)	78.9 (26.1)
Daily mean °F (°C)	50.7 (10.4)	54.6 (12.6)	60.1 (15.6)	66.2 (19.0)	73.4 (23.0)	79.0 (26.1)	81.1 (27.3)	81.2 (27.3)	77.2 (25.1)	68.6 (20.3)	59.0 (15.0)	53.2 (11.8)	67.0 (19.4)
Mean daily minimum °F (°C)	38.6 (3.7)	42.2 (5.7)	47.2 (8.4)	52.8 (11.6)	60.3 (15.7)	67.9 (19.9)	70.1 (21.2)	71.0 (21.7)	66.5 (19.2)	56.8 (13.8)	46.6 (8.1)	41.3 (5.2)	55.1 (12.8)
Mean minimum °F (°C)	23.6 (−4.7)	26.7 (−2.9)	31.3 (−0.4)	39.2 (4.0)	48.9 (9.4)	61.5 (16.4)	67.0 (19.4)	66.0 (18.9)	57.1 (13.9)	40.9 (4.9)	31.0 (−0.6)	27.1 (−2.7)	21.7 (−5.7)
Record low °F (°C)	3 (−16)	15 (−9)	18 (−8)	30 (−1)	41 (5)	46 (8)	59 (15)	59 (15)	46 (8)	27 (−3)	17 (−8)	10 (−12)	3 (−16)
Average precipitation inches (mm)	3.83 (97)	3.31 (84)	3.73 (95)	3.66 (93)	2.84 (72)	7.08 (180)	5.33 (135)	5.11 (130)	4.22 (107)	3.71 (94)	2.47 (63)	3.12 (79)	48.41 (1,230)
Average precipitation days (≥ 0.01 in)	9.3	9.1	9.0	7.1	8.1	13.5	14.2	14.7	9.2	7.6	7.4	9.1	118.3
Source: NOAA

== Demographics ==
Historical population
Census	Pop.	Note	%±
1860	166		—
1870	1,199		622.3%
1880	1,515		26.4%
1890	2,854		88.4%
1900	5,613		96.7%
1910	7,656		36.4%
1920	10,783		40.8%
1930	13,482		25.0%
1940	15,595		15.7%
1950	20,046		28.5%
1960	30,652		52.9%
1970	32,303		5.4%
1980	37,596		16.4%
1990	39,806		5.9%
2000	43,724		9.8%
2010	54,518		24.7%
2020	55,378		1.6%
U.S. Decennial Census; 1850–1870 1870–1880; 1890–1910 1920–1930; 1940 1950 1960; 1970 1980 1990; 2000 2010

At the 1860 United States census, Valdosta had a population of 166, which has increased in every subsequent decennial census.

=== Racial and ethnic composition ===
Valdosta city, Georgia – Racial and ethnic composition Note: the US Census treats Hispanic/Latino as an ethnic category. This table excludes Latinos from the racial categories and assigns them to a separate category. Hispanics/Latinos may be of any race.
Race / Ethnicity (NH = Non-Hispanic)	Pop 2000	Pop 2010	Pop 2020	% 2000	% 2010	% 2020
White alone (NH)	20,440	22,634	18,863	46.75%	41.52%	34.06%
Black or African American alone (NH)	21,091	27,620	30,060	48.24%	50.66%	54.28%
Native American or Alaska Native alone (NH)	92	129	109	0.21%	0.24%	0.20%
Asian alone (NH)	604	919	865	1.38%	1.69%	1.56%
Native Hawaiian or Pacific Islander alone (NH)	12	45	34	0.03%	0.08%	0.06%
Other race alone (NH)	71	161	238	0.16%	0.30%	0.43%
Mixed race or Multiracial (NH)	460	806	1,854	1.05%	1.48%	3.35%
Hispanic or Latino (any race)	954	2,204	3,355	2.18%	4.04%	6.06%
Total	43,724	54,518	55,378	100.00%	100.00%	100.00%

=== 2020 census ===
As of the 2020 census, Valdosta had a population of 55,378. The median age was 30.4 years. 23.1% of residents were under the age of 18 and 13.6% of residents were 65 years of age or older. For every 100 females there were 85.9 males, and for every 100 females age 18 and over there were 81.7 males age 18 and over.

Among the 21,627 households in Valdosta, 29.2% had children under the age of 18 living in them. Of all households, 29.8% were married-couple households, 22.0% were households with a male householder and no spouse or partner present, and 40.5% were households with a female householder and no spouse or partner present. About 33.2% of all households were made up of individuals and 10.8% had someone living alone who was 65 years of age or older. There were 11,224 families residing in the city.

98.8% of residents lived in urban areas, while 1.2% lived in rural areas.

There were 24,177 housing units, of which 10.5% were vacant. The homeowner vacancy rate was 2.8% and the rental vacancy rate was 8.7%.

Racial composition as of the 2020 census
Race	Number	Percentage
White	19,616	35.4%
Black or African American	30,372	54.8%
American Indian and Alaska Native	182	0.3%
Asian	886	1.6%
Native Hawaiian and Other Pacific Islander	41	0.1%
Some other race	1,523	2.8%
Two or more races	2,758	5.0%
Hispanic or Latino (of any race)	3,355	6.1%

=== 2010 census ===
At the 2010 United States census, 54,518 people resided in Valdosta.

=== 2000 census ===
In 2000, the city's population was 43,724.

The median income for a household in the city was $31,940, and the median income for a family was $39,295. Males had a median income of $33,230 versus $25,689 for females. The per capita income for the city was $19,003. About 20.3% of families and 28.2% of the population were below the poverty line, including 34.3% of those under age 18 and 13.1% of those age 65 or over.

=== American Community Survey ===
According to the 2022 American Community Survey, its population was 55% African American, 35% White, 1% Asian, 2% multiracial, and 5% Hispanic or Latino of any race. Among its racially diverse population, the median age was 29.2.

In 2022, there were 24,837 housing units in Valdosta. Approximately 87% were occupied and 60% were renter-occupied. The majority of its units were single unit family homes and the median value of an owner-occupied housing unit was $152,100. Among its population, 16.8% of the city has moved since 2021; of its movers, 7% relocated from the same county, 6% from a different county, and 3% from another state.

As of the 2022 American Community Survey's estimates, the median household income was $41,365 with a per capita income of $24,946. An estimated 28.4% of the city's population lived at or below the poverty line, and 38% of children under age 18 were considered in poverty.

== Economy ==
Located in the far southern portion of the state, near the Florida line along the Interstate 75 corridor, it is a commercial center of South Georgia with numerous manufacturing plants. The surrounding area produces tobacco, naval stores, particularly turpentine, as well as pine lumber and pulpwood. According to the Georgia Department of Community Affairs, Valdosta is called the "Naval Stores Capital of the World" because it supplies 80% of the world demand for naval stores.

In the retailing field, Valdosta has one major regional mall, Valdosta Mall, which features national chain anchor stores. Several large stores surround the mall or are near the mall. Valdosta has other notable shopping areas such as the Historic Downtown area with many local businesses, and the Five Points area which has large retailers and numerous national franchise and local restaurants. Moody Air Force Base is located about 10 miles (16 km) northeast of Valdosta in northern Lowndes County. Wild Adventures, a 166-acre (67 ha) theme and water park, is located 10 miles (16 km) south of the center of Valdosta in rural Lowndes County. Wild Adventures is owned by Herschend Family Entertainment.

== Arts and culture ==
=== Public libraries ===
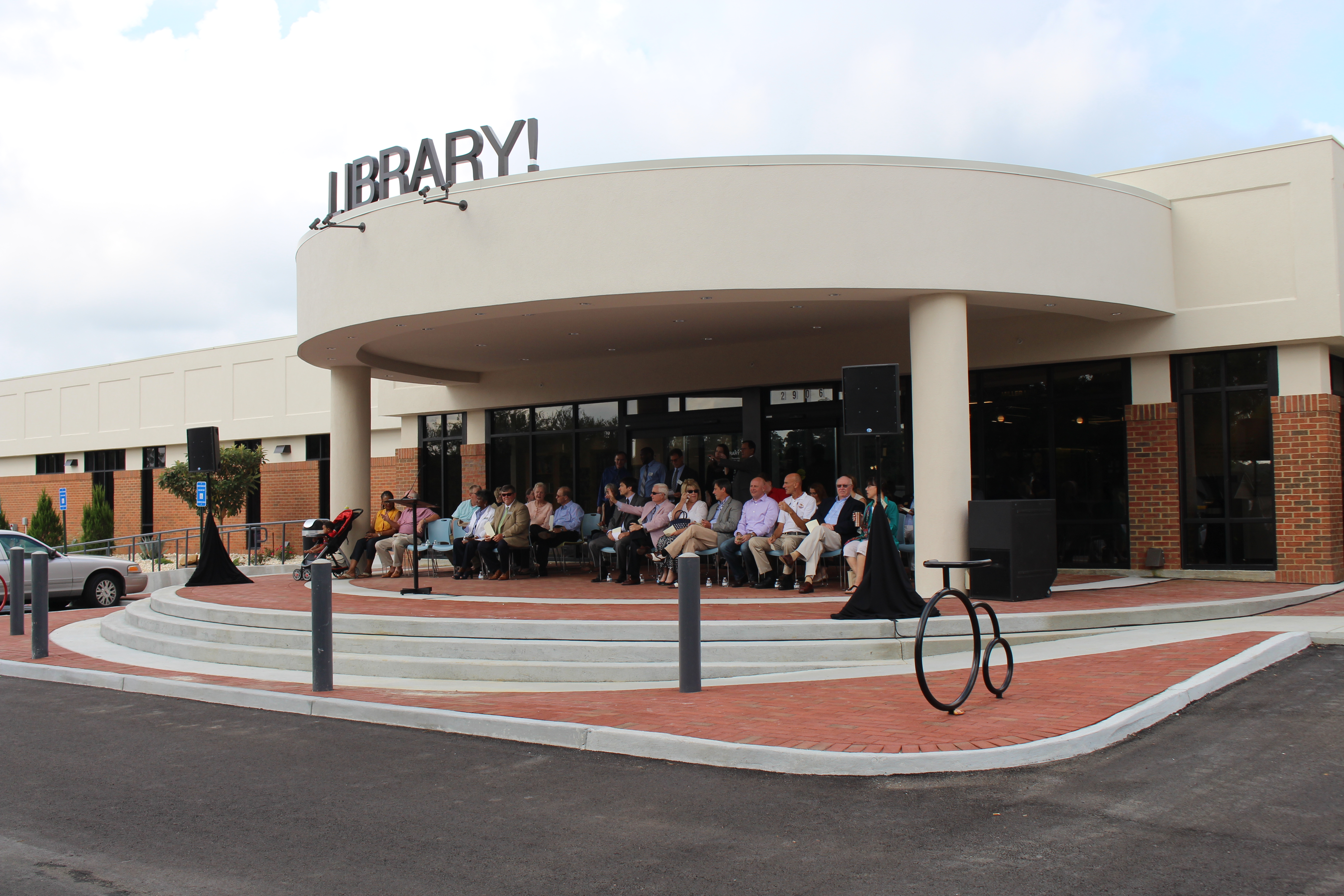
Valdosta Lowndes County Library

The South Georgia Regional Library operates two libraries in Valdosta: Valdosta Lowndes County Library and Mae Wisenbaker McMullen Memorial Southside Library. Valdosta Lowndes County Library, with over 32,000 square feet (3,000 m^{2}) of space, houses the administrative offices of the library system. Built for $450,000, it first opened in 1968. The Mae Wisenbaker McMullen Memorial Southside Library opened on May 31, 1992. An area businessperson, J.C. McMullen, donated the land used for the Southside Library, which was built as part of a larger library construction program; it was named after Mae Wisenbaker McMullen, the mother of J.C. McMullen.

The first library for African-Americans in Lowndes County began operations in the Walton Building on January 21, 1935, closed in February 1939, and reopened in 1955. In 1963, all libraries became available to patrons of all races.

=== Museum ===
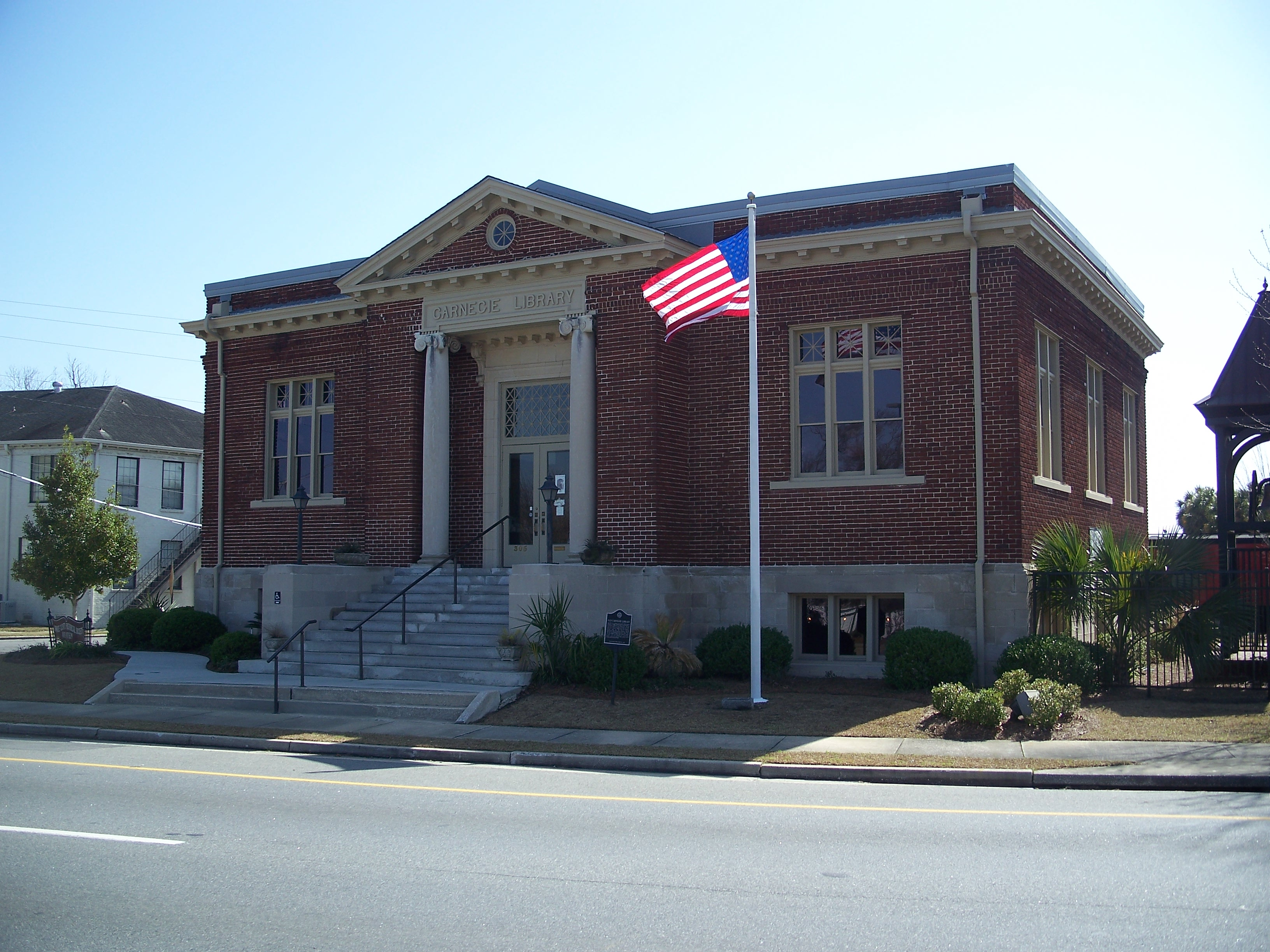
Lowndes County Historical Society & Museum in the former Carnegie Library

The Lowndes County Historical Society & Museum is located at the Carnegie Library of Valdosta, a National Register of Historic Places listed building and Carnegie library, one of 24 Carnegie libraries in Georgia.

=== Civic center ===
The Lowndes County Civic Center is a 120-seat multi-purpose arena that can be rented by the public and is often used to host community sporting events. The arena was also an occasional venue for Southern Championship Wrestling and Spinebusters Championship Wrestling.

=== LGBT pride ===
The South Georgia Pride Festival is held every third Saturday in September. The first festival was held in 2008 on the front lawn of Valdosta State University. In 2009, the festival became South Georgia Pride and held its festival at the John W. Saunders Park in Valdosta in 2010. Valdosta Mayor John J. Fretti proclaimed September 17, 2011, as South Georgia Pride Day. Since 2010, the festival has grown to over 3,000 people attending. In July 2012, Mayor John Gayle refused to give a proclamation to South Georgia Pride, the only one he has refused.

== Sports ==
=== Minor league baseball ===
Valdosta hosted several different minor league baseball teams during the twentieth century, and was one of six cities in the Georgia State League which began play in 1906, with the team known as the Valdosta Stars. From 1946 to 1958, the Valdosta Tigers were a "Class-D" minor league team. Valdosta was also home to the Valdosta Trojans which was a "farm" team for the Brooklyn Dodgers.

=== ESPN's Titletown, USA ===
TitleTown USA was a month-long segment on ESPN that started in the spring of 2008 and continued through July. Fans nominated towns and cities across the country based on their championship pedigree. A panel reviewed the nominees, and fan voting in May determined the 20th finalist. SportsCenter visited each city in July, and fan voting July 23–27 determined the winner. Due to the Valdosta High School football team's record as well as multiple championships in many sports by Valdosta State University, Lowndes High School, Valwood School, Georgia Christian School, and other academic institutions in the town, Valdosta was nominated as a finalist in 2008 for ESPN's "Titletown USA" contest. On July 28, 2008, with 29.2% of fan votes on ESPN's website poll, Valdosta was named TitleTown USA.

The football team at Valdosta High School has more wins than any other American high school, and is second in overall wins in the country after University of Michigan.

== Education ==
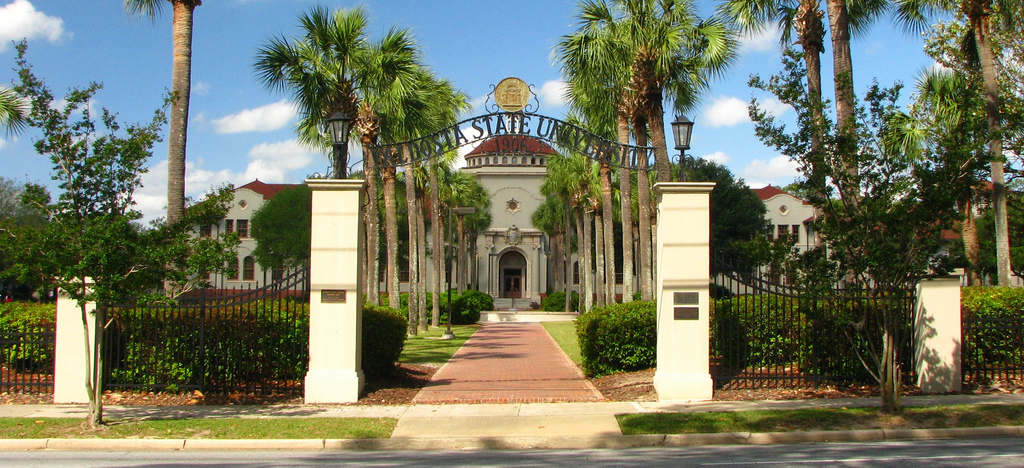
Valdosta State University

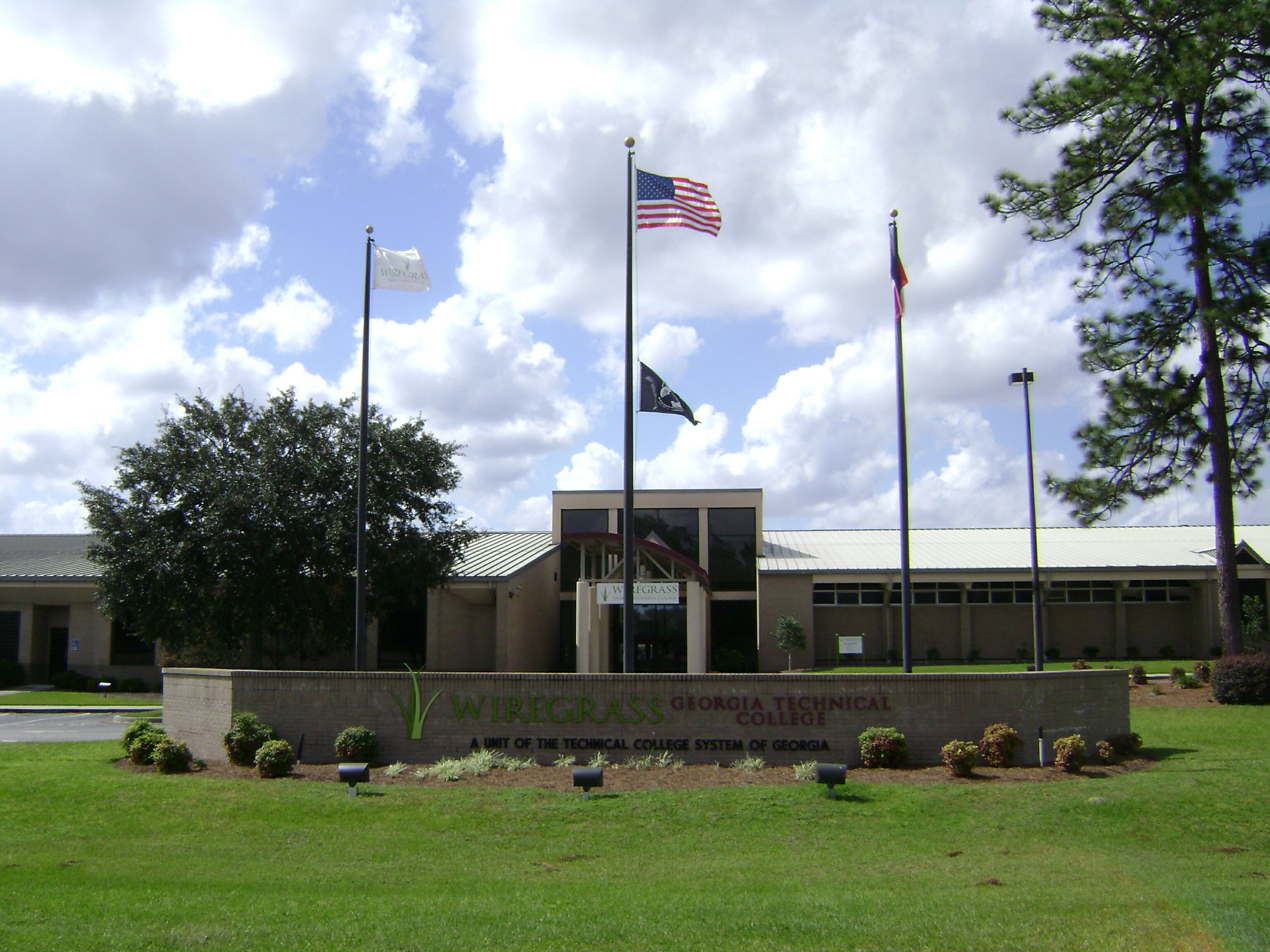
Wiregrass Georgia Technical College

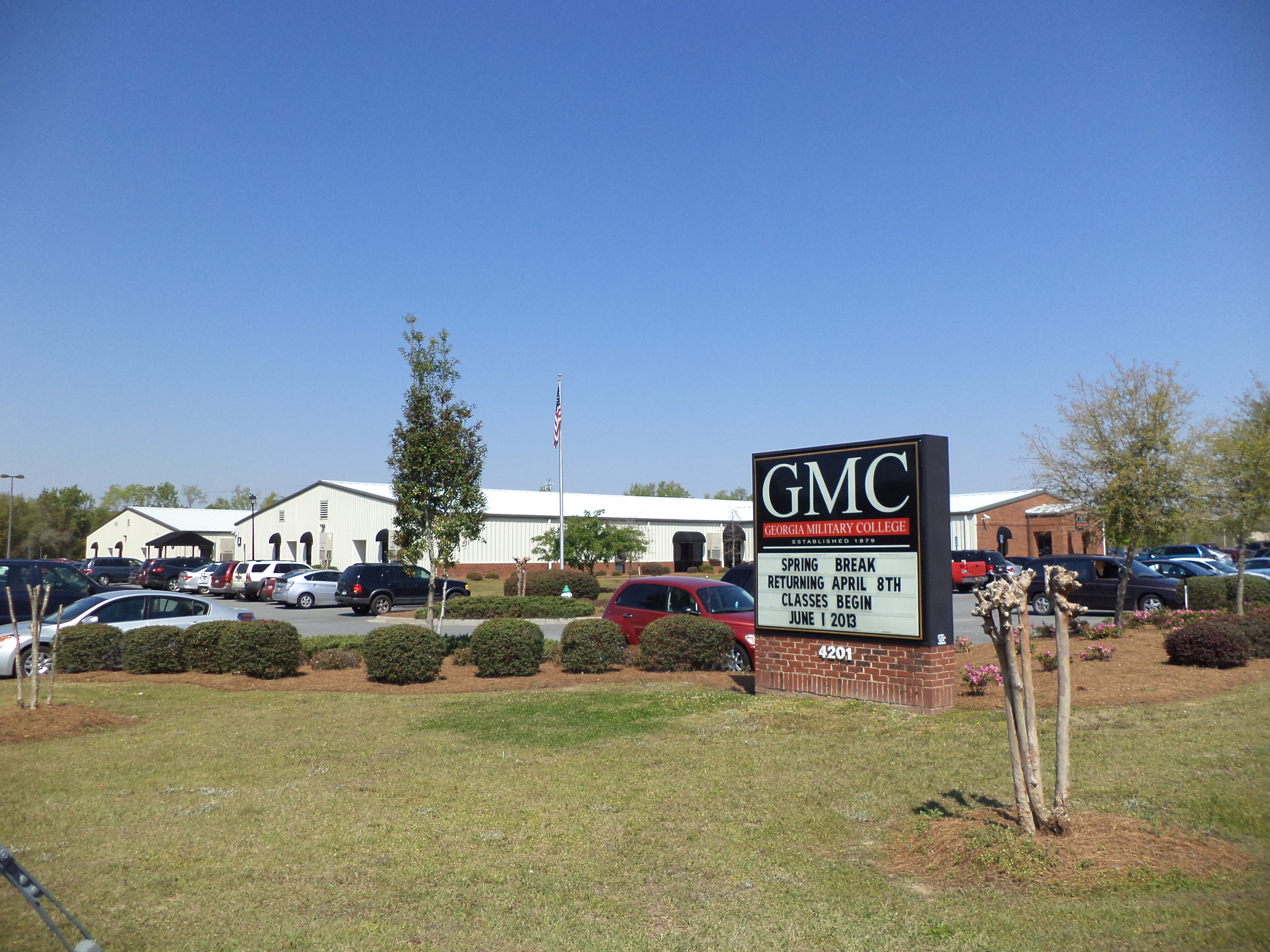
Georgia Military College Valdosta Campus

=== Public schools ===
The Valdosta City School District holds grades pre-school to grade twelve, consisting of five elementary schools, two middle schools, and one high school (Valdosta High School). The school district serves the city limits of Valdosta. As of 2022 the district has 482 full-time teachers and over 8,294 students.

The Lowndes County School District serves communities of Lowndes County outside of the Valdosta city limits. The Lowndes County School District, which has its administration building located in the city limits, has seven elementary schools, three middle schools, and one high school (Lowndes High School in the Valdosta city limits). The District has a total of 10,728 students and nearly 600 teachers and staff.

Scintilla Charter Academy is a free public school of choice open to any student who resides in Lowndes County or the city of Valdosta. SCA holds grades kindergarten to ninth grade.

=== Private schools ===
Valwood School is an independent college preparatory school north of Valdosta enrolling students in pre-kindergarten through twelfth grade. Several Christian schools offering grades K–12 also operate in and near Valdosta, including Crossroads Baptist School, Georgia Christian School, Lighthouse Christian School, Open Bible Christian School, Highland Christian Academy, St. John Catholic School, and Victory Christian School.

=== Higher education ===
Valdosta is the home of Valdosta State University (VSU), founded in 1906 as South Georgia State Normal College for Women. It became part of the University System of Georgia in 1950 as Valdosta State College. It achieved university status and became VSU in 1993 and is one of two regional universities in Georgia.

An extension of Georgia Military College is in the city limits, and Wiregrass Georgia Technical College is located a mile outside of the city limits off Interstate 75.

Also located in Valdosta is Embry–Riddle Aeronautical University Worldwide: Moody Campus.

== Media ==
=== Newspaper ===
- The Valdosta Daily Times

=== Radio ===
AM:

- WJEM 1150 AM; 5 kW Gospel
- WVLD 1450 AM; 1 kW Rock (Rock 106.9)
- WGUN 950 AM; 4 kW Adult Urban Contemporary
- WRFV 910 AM; 50 kW

FM:

- WDDQ TALK 92.1 FM Talk radio
- WAYT 88.1 FM Christian Contemporary (licensed to Thomasville)
- WVVS 90.9 FM VSU station
- WWET 91.7 FM (Georgia Public Broadcasting)
- WAAC 92.9 FM Country
- WJYF 95.3 FM Christian Contemporary
- WQPW 95.7 FM Adult Contemporary
- WJEM 96.1 (repeater of 1150 AM)
- WGOV-FM 96.7 FM Urban
- WAFT 101.1 FM Christian
- WXHT 102.7 FM Pop Hits (Broadcast from Valdosta but licensed to Madison, Florida)
- WSTI 105.3 FM Classic Soul and R&B (Broadcast from Valdosta but licensed to Quitman)
- W295AO 106.9 Rock (repeater of WVLD 1450AM)
- WWRQ 107.9 FM The Beat

=== Television ===
Valdosta and Lowndes County is part of the Tallahassee, Florida television market and receives most channels from that city; it also receives some channels from the neighboring Albany market.

- WSWG channel 44 is the local CBS affiliate licensed to Valdosta and based in Moultrie. The station serves the Valdosta and Albany areas, and includes subchannels offering programming from MyNetworkTV and Me-TV.
- WXGA-TV channel 8 is the local GPB outlet, licensed to Waycross.

== Infrastructure ==
=== Transportation ===
==== Major highways ====
- Interstate 75 (State Route 401) runs north to south through a western section of Valdosta, with access from Exits 11 through 22. I-75 leads north 46 miles (74 km) to Tifton and southeast 62 miles (100 km) to Lake City, Florida.
- U.S. Highway 41 (State Route 7) runs north to south entering the city at the Withlacoochee River being known as North Valdosta Road, and continuing south on North Ashley Street. It branches into two sections at Five Points, US 41 Business / SR 7 Business traveling south down North Ashley Street, US 41 Alternate / SR 7 Alternate traveling south down Patterson Street. At the overpass over the CSX railroad, they join to become US 41 Business / SR 7 Business following South Patterson Street.
- U.S. Highway 84 (Wiregrass Georgia Parkway) is colocated with State Route 38 and runs west to east bisecting the city and is known as Hill Avenue through the city limits. US 84 leads northeast 62 miles (100 km) to Waycross and west 43 miles (69 km) to Thomasville.
- U.S. Highway 221 follows US 84 and SR 38 west of Valdosta and State Route 31 northeast of Valdosta. US 221 leads west with US 84 17 miles (27 km) to Quitman and northeast 21 miles (34 km) to Lakeland.

==== Other transportation ====
- The Valdosta Regional Airport, 3 miles (5 km) south of the center of Valdosta, is served by Delta Air Lines to Hartsfield–Jackson Atlanta International Airport as a Delta Connection. There is also a Greyhound bus station.

==== Pedestrians and cycling ====
- Azalea City Trail
- VSU Walking Trail System

==== Streetcar ====
- In 1898, the Valdosta Street Railway Company secured the right to operate streetcars on Patterson, Ashley, Toombs, Lee, Hill, Central, Crane and Gordon streets. Valdosta was one of the smallest cities in America to have a street railway system. The streetcar operated in the downtown area between 1899 and 1924. The abandoned tracks were removed in the 1940s to be used as scrap metal for the war effort.

==== Intercity rail ====
For several decades the Atlantic Coast Line and the Southern Railway ran regular passenger trains on a Chicago to Florida circuit, making stops in Valdosta, albeit at different stations. The Atlantic Coast Line ran the South Wind through Valdosta, and the Southern operated the Ponce de Leon and the Royal Palm through the town.

After Amtrak assumed passenger rail operations in the United States in 1971 it operated the Floridian from Chicago to St. Petersburg and Miami. In a group of several train disestablishments in 1979, Amtrak discontinued the Floridian, thus marking the last time that passenger trains served south Georgia (excepting the New York-Florida service in eastern Georgia).

== Notable people ==
- Michelle Anderson, president of Brooklyn College and a scholar on rape law
- Alex W. Bealer, Atlanta blacksmith and author; born in Valdosta in 1921
- Alfred Corn, poet and essayist; raised in Valdosta
- Doc Holliday, Western dentist, gunfighter and gambler; spent his youth in Valdosta
- Louis Lomax, African-American journalist and the son of a leading local educator
- James Lord Pierpont, composer of "Jingle Bells"; lived many years in Valdosta, where he taught music
- Elsie Quarterman, plant biologist and professor of biology at Vanderbilt University; born in Valdosta in 1910
- Mary Turner, African-American lynching victim

=== Entertainment ===
- Rhett Akins, country music artist, two-time Songwriter of the Year, member of the Peach Pickers writing trio and his son, Thomas Rhett, country music artist
- Don Fleming, indie rock musician and producer
- From First to Last (Matt Good, Derek Bloom and Travis Richer), post-hardcore band
- Ben Hayslip, two-time Country Music Songwriter of the Year. Member of The Peach Pickers along with Valdosta native Rhett Akins
- Bill Hicks, comedian; born in Valdosta
- NewSong, Christian band
- Margaret Pardee, violinist and violin teacher
- Pauley Perrette, actress best known for NCIS; attended Valdosta State University
- Billy Joe Royal, country music and pop artist; born in Valdosta
- Thomas Rhett, country music artist and songwriter
- Sonny Shroyer, actor best known for role as Enos Strate on The Dukes of Hazzard; born in Valdosta
- Domonique Simone, adult film star
- Pierce Wallace, ESPN Fan Hall of Fame and television personality
- Demond Wilson, minister and TV actor best known for playing Lamont on Sanford and Son
- William Workman, opera singer

=== Sports ===
- Briny Baird, professional golfer on PGA Tour and Nationwide Tour
- Buck Belue, former Valdosta High School standout and quarterback of the University of Georgia's 1980 national championship team, now a radio talk show host
- Dusty Bonner, VSU quarterback, later played for Kentucky, NFL's Atlanta Falcons and arena football league
- Dana Brinson, former NFL player
- Cliff Brown, soccer player and coach
- Vincent Burns, NFL defensive tackle (Indianapolis Colts)
- Lorenzo Cain, MLB center fielder
- Ellis Clary, former Major League Baseball (MLB) player, coach, and scout
- Buck Coats, former MLB player
- Pepper Daniels, baseball player in the Negro leagues
- William "Red" Dawson, only surviving coach of the 1970 Marshall tragedy, chronicled in the movie We Are Marshall
- J. D. Drew, former Major League Baseball player
- Harris English, professional golfer on the PGA Tour
- Dot Fulghum, played in MLB for the Philadelphia Athletics in 1921
- Willie Gary, NFL, St. Louis Rams, played in Super Bowl XXXVI
- Randall Godfrey, NFL linebacker, Dallas Cowboys, Seattle Seahawks and San Diego Chargers
- DL Hall, MLB prospect and former first-round pick
- Brice Hunter, NFL wide receiver, Tampa Bay Buccaneers
- Sean Kazmar Jr., former MLB player
- Malcolm Mitchell, NFL wide receiver, New England Patriots
- Kenny Moore II, NFL player
- Todd Peterson, former NFL player
- Jay Ratliff, NFL nose tackle, Dallas Cowboys, Chicago Bears
- Greg Reid, former Florida State and Valdosta State football player, now plays for Arena Football League team, Tampa Bay Storm
- Desmond (Desi) Relaford, MLB infielder
- Stan Rome, NFL player, Kansas City Chiefs (1979–1982)
- Coleman Rudolph, football player, Georgia Tech and NFL's New York Giants and Jets
- Glenn Schumann, football coach who is currently the co-defensive coordinator and inside linebackers coach for the Georgia Bulldogs
- Telvin Smith, NFL linebacker, played for Florida State Football, before being drafted to the Jacksonville Jaguars
- Colby Thomas, MLB outfielder for the Philadelphia Phillies

=== Politics ===
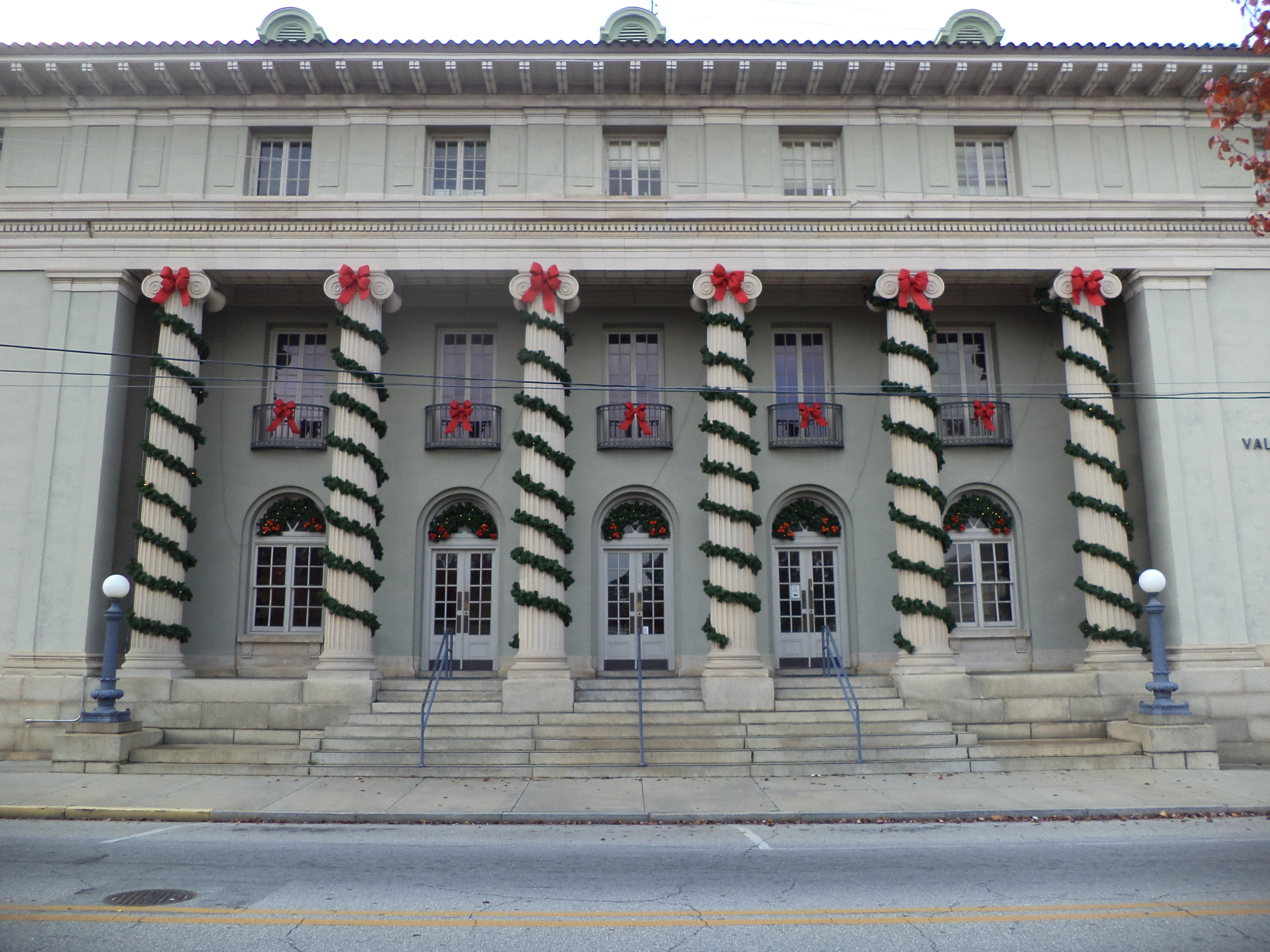
Valdosta City Hall

- Allen Boyd, served as a Democrat in the U.S. House of Representatives from Florida from 1997 to 2011
- Charlie Norwood, served as a Republican congressman from Georgia from 1995 to 2007
- Melvin E. Thompson, the 71st governor of Georgia, retired and died in Valdosta

== Valdosta in fiction ==
- Parts of Fannie Flagg's novel Fried Green Tomatoes at the Whistle Stop Cafe and the 1991 film based upon the novel are set in Valdosta.
- In Allen Steele's science fiction novel Coyote Frontier, Valdosta in the year 2070 is the site of Camp Buchanan, an internment camp for dissident liberal intellectuals.
- Scenes from Ernest in the Army take place in Valdosta, even though the entire film was shot in South Africa.
- Scenes from the film Zombieland, starring Woody Harrelson, were shot on Valdosta streets and at nearby Wild Adventures theme park.
- In Cotton Patch Gospel, Joe moves Jesus and the rest of the family to Valdosta when Herod dies.
- The Lady Chablis performed in Valdosta in the novel Midnight in the Garden of Good and Evil by John Berendt.
- The 1986 movie As Summers Die starring Bette Davis and Jamie Lee Curtis was filmed in Valdosta.
- In John Steinbeck's novel East of Eden, Adam Trask stops in Valdosta to steal supplies and request money from his brother Charles after escaping from a Florida chain gang on his way back to Connecticut.
- In the movie The Further Adventures of Tennessee Buck, the title character claims that they are heading towards "the roughest country this side of Valdosta, Georgia".
- One of the opening sketches of the second episode of the first season of the sketch comedy series Mr. Show with Bob and David features a Dixiecrat senator, played by Bob Odenkirk, attending a folk festival in Valdosta and ordering it shut down when he decides the featured exhibits are too suggestive.
