= Valdosta Mall =

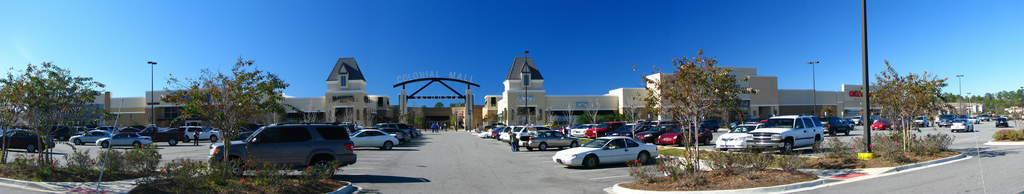
- Location: Valdosta, Georgia, United States
- Coordinates: 30.84456°N 83.32188°W
- Address: 1700 Norman Dr
- Opened: 1983
- Manager: Hackney Real Estate Partners
- Num. of stores: 70+
- Num. of anchor tenants: 7 (6 open,1 vacant)
- Floor area: 560,000 sq ft (52,026 m^{2})
- Floors: 1
- Website: shopvaldostamall.com

Valdosta Mall is an enclosed shopping mall located in Valdosta, Georgia, United States.

It is composed of more than 70 stores and restaurants in 560,000 sq ft (52,026 m^{2}) of gross leasable area. Belk, and JCPenney, are the mall's anchor stores. The wing featuring JCPenney was part of a 1985 expansion. An Additional Vacant Anchor was previously a Sears which closed in 2018. In 2006, an outdoor concourse was added to the mall's front face, bringing in Old Navy, PetSmart, Office Depot and Ross Dress For Less as junior anchors. In 2007, the JCPenney store expanded greatly, taking over some of the space vacated when the old movie theater moved across the street.

The mall was formerly known as Colonial Mall Valdosta under the ownership of Colonial Properties Trust who sold the mall to Gregory Greenfield and Associates in 2007.

In 2015, the Office Depot was replaced with a Bed Bath & Beyond.

On November 2, 2017, it was announced that Sears would be closing as part of a plan to close 63 stores nationwide. The store closed in January 2018.

In December 2018, the FYE store in the mall announced its closing, and a storewide discount of 30-50% began. It is closed completely as of January 22, 2019.

As of 2025 the mall was managed by Hackney Real Estate Partners.

In 2023, Bed Bath & Beyond closed due to their bankruptcy.
