= WVVS-FM =

Valdosta, Georgia; United States
- Broadcast area: Lowndes County, Georgia
- Frequency: 90.9 MHz
- Branding: Blaze FM 90.9

Programming
- Format: college/diverse

Ownership
- Owner: Valdosta State University; (Board of the University System of Ga / Valdosta State Un)

History
- First air date: 26 July 1971
- Call sign meaning: The Voice of Valdosta State

Technical information
- Licensing authority: FCC
- Facility ID: 69649
- Class: A
- ERP: 5,300 watts
- HAAT: 21 m (69 ft)
- Transmitter coordinates: 30°50′50″N 83°17′26″W

Links
- Public license information: Public file; LMS
- Website: WVVS website

WVVS-FM (90.9 FM) was a radio station broadcasting a college radio format, and licensed to serve Valdosta, Georgia, United States. The station was owned and operated by the students of Valdosta State University, though unlike other college radio stations in the state, the "Board of the University System of Ga" is listed on the broadcast license, with VSU listed second. It was known as Blaze FM, and previously was V91 until the summer of 2007. The station started broadcasting on 26 July 1971 with a small number of watts and in monophonic only.

In early 2010, the station applied for and was granted a construction permit, allowing it to slightly change location (by a few arcseconds of latitude and longitude on campus), switch from an omnidirectional antenna to a directional antenna, reduce power, increase height, and switch from horizontal-only to vertical-only polarization on its radio antenna. This will significantly reduce its broadcast range toward Hahira and Moody AFB in the northern part of Lowndes county, and slightly reduce it toward Lake Park in the south-southeast, but will slightly increase it toward the Brooks county panhandle in the west.

In 2020, Georgia Public Broadcasting and Valdosta State University announced they were partnering to hand the station over to GPB Radio, making the student-run version of the station effectively defunct. GPB Radio programming now airs from 6am-8pm every day of the week.

== See also ==
- Campus radio
- List of college radio stations in the United States
