= WVLD =

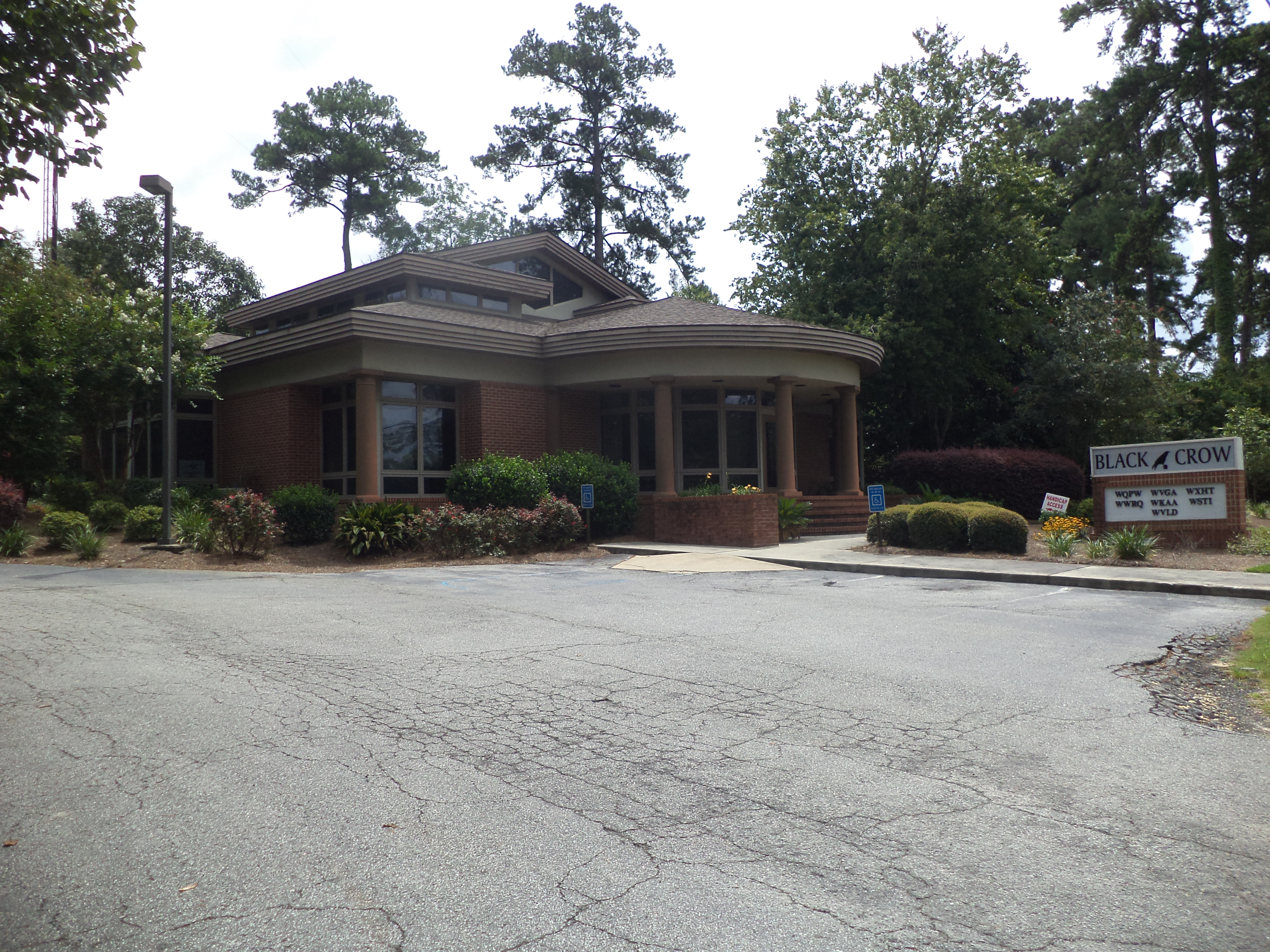
- Black Crow Media studios

Valdosta, Georgia; United States
- Broadcast area: Valdosta, Georgia
- Frequency: 1450 kHz
- Branding: Rock 93.3

Programming
- Format: Mainstream rock
- Affiliations: United Stations Radio Networks

Ownership
- Owner: Black Crow Media of Valdosta, LLC
- Sister stations: WKAA, WQPW, WSTI-FM, WVGA, WWRQ-FM, WXHT

History
- First air date: 1959
- Call sign meaning: Valdosta

Technical information
- Licensing authority: FCC
- Facility ID: 69647
- Class: C
- Power: 860 watts
- Transmitter coordinates: 30°50′5.00″N 83°17′57.00″W
- Translator: 93.3 W227DP (Valdosta)

Links
- Public license information: Public file; LMS
- Webcast: Listen live
- Website: 933rocks.com

WVLD (1450 AM, "WVLD Rock 93.3") is a commercial radio station licensed to Valdosta, Georgia, United States, and serving the Valdosta area. Owned by Black Crow Media, it broadcasts a mainstream rock format.

As of September 1, 2015, WVLD 1450 was once again simulcasting their signal on 106.9 FM. The Black Crow Media rock station (formerly WWRQ Rock 108) was moved to WVLD and rebranded at "WVLD Rock 106.9".

== History ==
As of February 11, 2008, WVLD 1450 started simulcasting on 106.9 FM and branded under that frequency. The station also shifted the weekday programming lineup away from all ESPN to include ESPN's Mike and Mike in the Morning, the Neal Boortz Show, the Clark Howard Show, and the Dave Ramsey Show. On the weekends, WVLD still carried ESPN Radio. However, the station was later branded as "106.9 FM WVLD" instead of former "ESPN 1450".

On February 1, 2013, WVLD changed format to classic rock, branded as "The Eagle". It later rebranded as "Rock 106.9".

On August 6, 2021, WVLD rebranded as "Rock 93.3", with the launch of new translator W227DP 93.3 FM Valdosta. The 106.9 FM translator has gone silent.

== Previous logo ==
(WVLD's logo under previous 106.9 translator)
