= WJHC (FM) =

- Jasper, Florida; United States
- Frequency: 107.5 MHz
- Branding: Talk 107.5

Programming
- Format: Talk radio
- Affiliations: Compass Media Networks; Premiere Networks; Salem Radio Network; Townhall; Westwood One

Ownership
- Owner: Smalltown Broadcasting, LLC
- Sister stations: WDDQ, WJEM, WSFB

Technical information
- Licensing authority: FCC
- Facility ID: 183337
- Class: A
- ERP: 6,000 watts
- HAAT: 89.8 meters (295 ft)
- Transmitter coordinates: 30°31′20″N 82°57′06″W

Links
- Public license information: Public file; LMS
- Website: talk1075.com

WJHC (107.5 FM) is a radio station licensed to Jasper, Florida. The station broadcasts a talk radio format and is owned by Smalltown Broadcasting, LLC.
