= WWRQ-FM =

Valdosta, Georgia; United States
- Broadcast area: Valdosta area
- Frequency: 107.9 MHz
- Branding: 107.9 The Beat

Programming
- Format: Urban contemporary
- Affiliations: Compass Media Networks

Ownership
- Owner: Black Crow Media
- Sister stations: WKAA, WQPW, WSTI-FM, WVGA, WVLD, WXHT

History
- First air date: 1992

Technical information
- Licensing authority: FCC
- Facility ID: 863
- Class: C2
- ERP: 50,000 watts
- HAAT: 82 meters
- Transmitter coordinates: 31°3′21.00″N 83°13′54.00″W

Links
- Public license information: Public file; LMS
- Webcast: Listen Live
- Website: thebeat1079.com

WWRQ-FM (107.9 MHz) better known as "The Beat" is a radio station broadcasting an urban contemporary format. Licensed to Valdosta, Georgia, United States, the station serves the Valdosta area. The station is currently owned by Black Crow Media. Before a programming change in 2015, the station was also known as Rock 108 and played classic and modern rock.

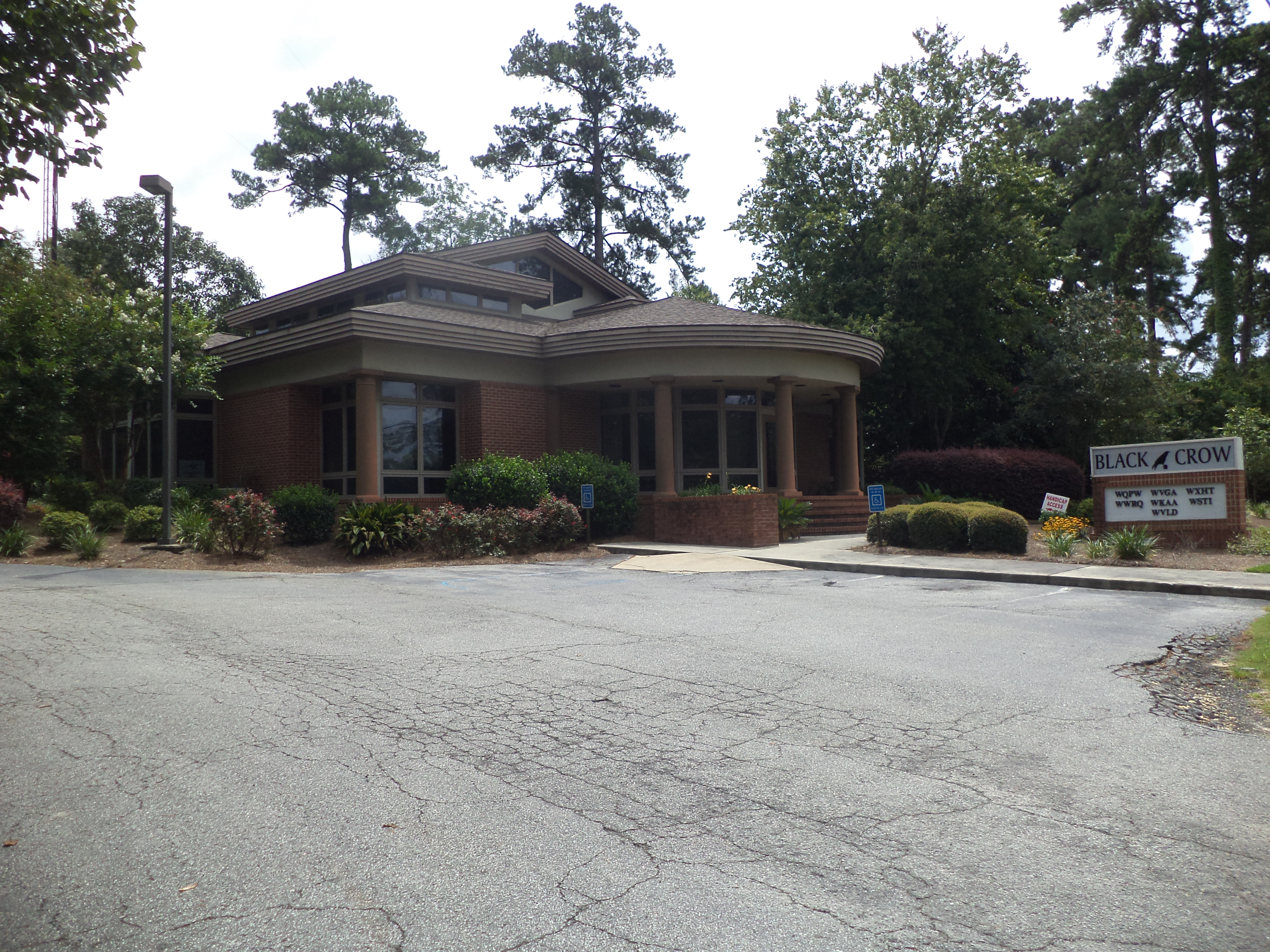
Black Crow Media Studios
