= WJEM =

- Valdosta, Georgia; United States
- Broadcast area: Downtown; Hahira, Georgia; Jennings, Florida
- Frequency: 1150 kHz
- Branding: The Jock

Programming
- Format: Sports
- Affiliations: Fox Sports Radio

Ownership
- Owner: Smalltown Broadcasting, LLC
- Sister stations: WDDQ, WJHC, WSFB

History
- First air date: August 1955

Technical information
- Licensing authority: FCC
- Facility ID: 73133
- Class: D
- Power: 2,300 watts day 50 watts night
- Transmitter coordinates: 30°50′49.00″N 83°14′14.00″W
- Translator: 94.3 W232DB (Valdosta)

Links
- Public license information: Public file; LMS
- Website: foxsportsvaldosta.com

WJEM (1150 AM) is a radio station broadcasting a sports format. Licensed to Valdosta, Georgia, United States, the station is currently owned by Smalltown Broadcasting, LLC. The station began broadcasting in August 1955.

== Previous logo ==
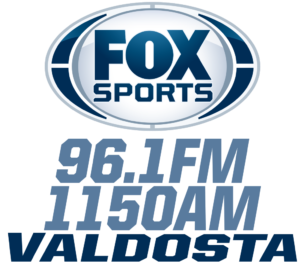
(WJEM's logo under previous 96.1 translator)
