= WRFV =

Valdosta, Georgia; United States
- Frequency: 910 kHz

Programming
- Format: Defunct

Ownership
- Owner: Rama Communications, Inc.

History
- First air date: 1951
- Former call signs: WFVR, WGAF

Technical information
- Facility ID: 21807
- Class: B
- Power: 5,000 watts day 5,000 watts night
- Transmitter coordinates: 30°52′21.00″N 83°20′36.00″W

WRFV (910 AM) was a radio station licensed to Valdosta, Georgia, United States. The station was last owned by Rama Communications, Inc.

== History ==
The station went on the air in 1951 as WGAF. The call letters changed to WFVR (Florida Vacation Radio) on June 1, 1986. On January 19, 2007, the station changed its call sign to WRFV (Radio Free Valdosta).

Citing financial reasons, the station notified the Federal Communications Commission that on July 1, 2011, it had suspended broadcasting. The station received permission to do so with instructions to resume broadcasting by July 1, 2012, or forfeit its license. The station's license was cancelled on October 1, 2019.
