= WDDQ =

- Adel, Georgia; United States
- Broadcast area: Valdosta, Georgia
- Frequency: 92.1 MHz
- Branding: Talk 92.1

Programming
- Format: Talk
- Affiliations: Compass Media Networks; Premiere Networks; Salem Radio Network; Townhall; Westwood One

Ownership
- Owner: Smalltown Broadcasting, LLC
- Sister stations: WJEM, WJHC, WSFB

History
- First air date: February 13, 1980 (license grant date)

Technical information
- Licensing authority: FCC
- Facility ID: 72786
- Class: A
- ERP: 2,600 watts
- HAAT: 154.1 meters (506 ft)
- Transmitter coordinates: 31°8′15.00″N 83°23′41.00″W
- Repeater: 1490 WSFB (Quitman)

Links
- Public license information: Public file; LMS
- Website: talk921.com

WDDQ (92.1 FM) is a radio station broadcasting a talk format. Licensed to Adel, Georgia, United States, the station serves the Valdosta, Georgia area. The station is currently owned by Smalltown Broadcasting, LLC.

== History ==
Former logo

In September 1979, the assigned call sign WDDQ was established before the station launched on February 13, 1980 with an adult contemporary music format. WDDQ had multiple format flips throughout the late-1980s and most of the 1990s. In 1988, the station dropped adult contemporary and flipped to a classic rock format. Two years later in 1990, the station briefly flipped to country, and the following year in 1991, the station dropped the short-lived format and flipped to a tourist information radio format. The format lasted for five years until 1996, when the station dropped its tourist format and flipped to classic country. The station would then return to its original adult contemporary format in 1999. This would last for another seven years until 2006 when it dropped adult contemporary music entirely and flipped to its current talk format.
