= WAAC (FM) =

- Valdosta, Georgia; United States
- Frequency: 92.9 MHz
- Branding: 92.9 Country

Programming
- Format: Country

Ownership
- Owner: Rivers Radio Group; (W.G.O.V., Inc.)

History
- First air date: November 1966
- Former call signs: WGOV-FM (1966–1984)

Technical information
- Licensing authority: FCC
- Facility ID: 72122
- Class: C1
- ERP: 100,000 watts
- HAAT: 153.0 meters (502.0 ft)
- Transmitter coordinates: 30°48′13.00″N 83°21′20.00″W

Links
- Public license information: Public file; LMS

WAAC (92.9 FM) is a radio station broadcasting a Country format. Licensed to Valdosta, Georgia, United States, the station is currently owned by the Rivers Radio Group. It is the Heritage FM station, having been on the air since 1966.

== History ==
The station went on the air as WGOV-FM in November 1966. On February 20, 1984, the station changed its call-sign to the current WAAC.

The "GOV" referred to the fact that it was owned by "Dee" Rivers, son of former Georgia governor E.D. Rivers.
