= WXHT =

- Madison, Florida; United States
- Broadcast area: Valdosta, Georgia
- Frequency: 102.7 MHz
- Branding: Hot 102.7

Programming
- Format: Top 40 (CHR)
- Affiliations: Premiere Networks; Westwood One

Ownership
- Owner: Black Crow Media
- Sister stations: WWRQ-FM, WKAA, WQPW, WVGA, WVLD, WSTI-FM

History
- First air date: April 1, 1989 (as WOOP)
- Former call signs: WOOP (1989–1989); WIMV (1989–2000)
- Call sign meaning: W X HoT

Technical information
- Licensing authority: FCC
- Facility ID: 48644
- Class: C3
- ERP: 19,000 watts
- HAAT: 115 meters (377 ft)
- Transmitter coordinates: 30°38′23.00″N 83°26′52.00″W
- Translators: 106.9 W295AO (Valdosta, Georgia)

Links
- Public license information: Public file; LMS
- Webcast: Listen Live
- Website: myhot1027.com

WXHT (102.7 FM), better known as "Hot 102.7", is a radio station broadcasting a contemporary hit radio format. Licensed to Madison, Florida, United States, the station is currently owned by Black Crow Media and features programming from Premiere Networks and Westwood One.

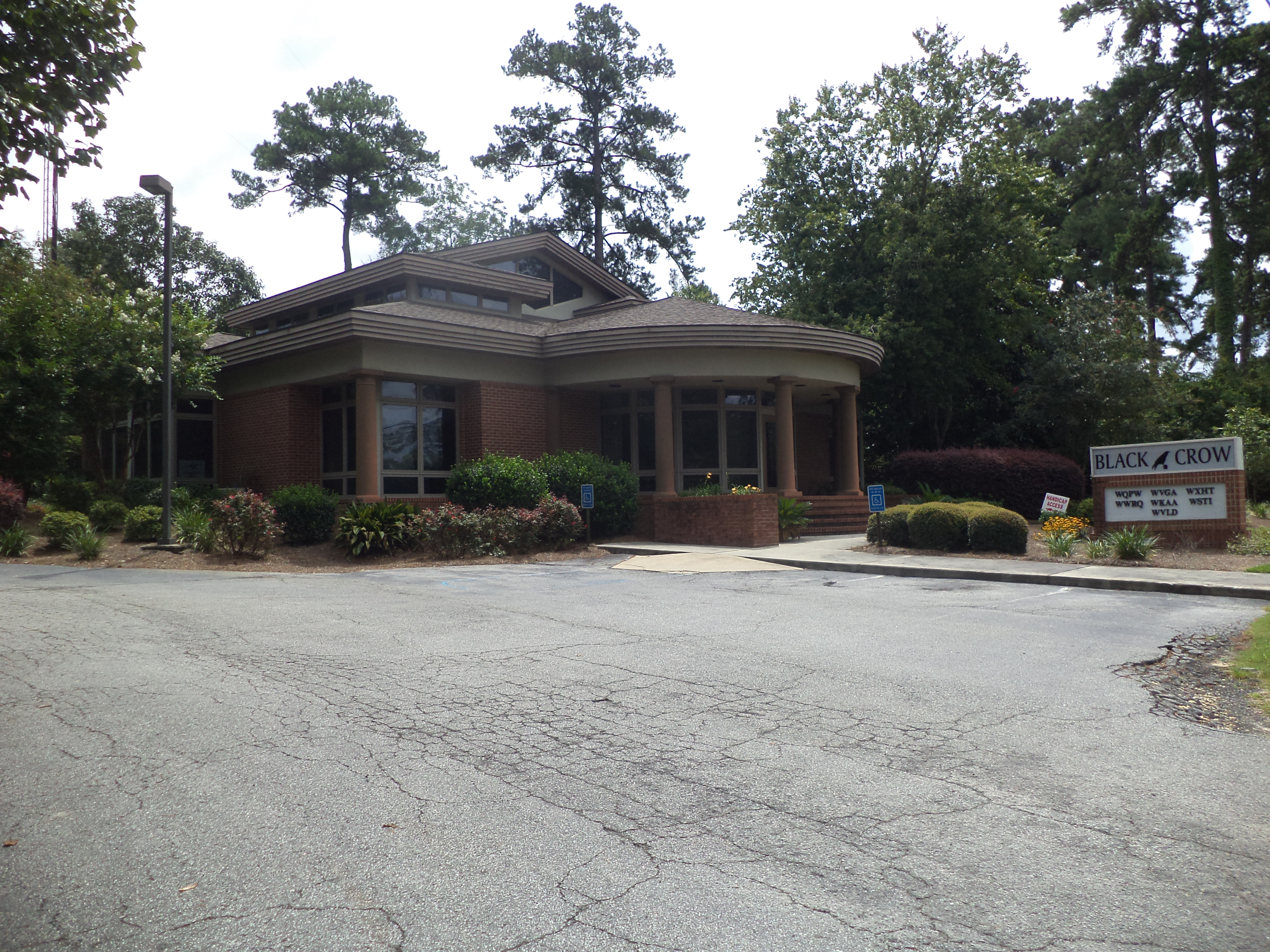
Black Crow Media Studios

== History ==
The station went on the air as WOOP on April 1, 1989. On October 17, 1989, the station changed its call sign to WIMV; and on July 14, 2000, to the current WXHT.
