= WSTI-FM =

- Quitman, Georgia; United States
- Broadcast area: Valdosta area
- Frequency: 105.3 MHz
- Branding: Star 105.3

Programming
- Format: Urban adult contemporary
- Affiliations: Compass Media Networks; Premiere Networks

Ownership
- Owner: Black Crow Media
- Sister stations: WKAA, WQPW, WVGA, WVLD, WWRQ-FM, WXHT

History
- Former call signs: WGAF-FM (1986–1987)

Technical information
- Licensing authority: FCC
- Facility ID: 1073
- Class: C3
- ERP: 25,000 watts
- HAAT: 97.0 meters (318.2 ft)
- Transmitter coordinates: 30°38′23.00″N 83°26′52.00″W

Links
- Public license information: Public file; LMS
- Webcast: Listen Live
- Website: mystar1053.com

WSTI-FM (105.3 MHz) better known as "Star 105.3" is a radio station broadcasting an urban adult contemporary format. Licensed to Quitman, Georgia, United States, the station is currently owned by Black Crow Media and features programming from Compass Media Networks and Premiere Networks. Notable programming includes syndicated Steve Harvey Morning Show and "The Sweat Hotel"

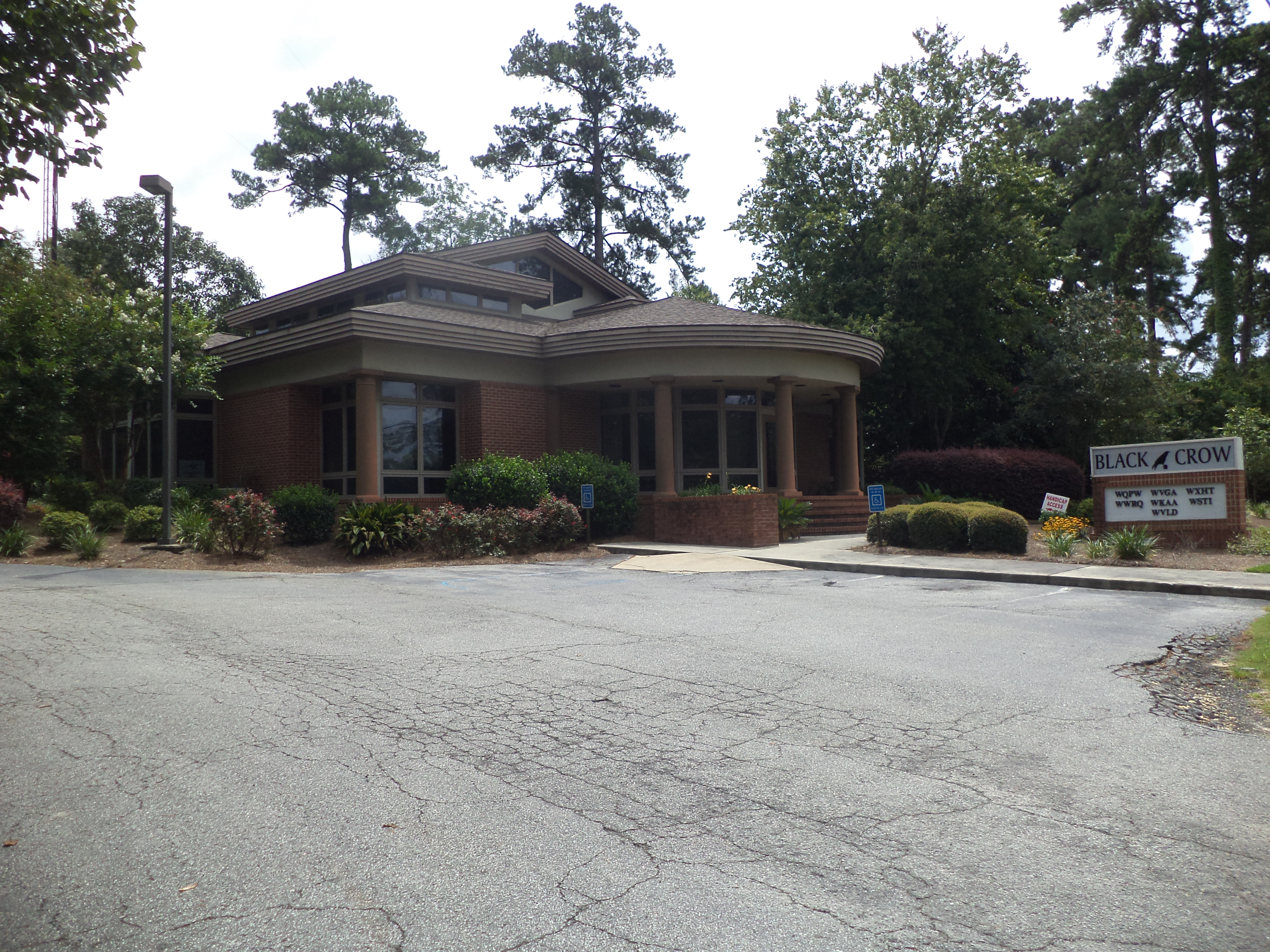
Black Crow Media Studios

== History ==
The station went on the air as WGAF-FM on 1986-10-01. On 1987-08-01, the station changed its call sign to the current WSTI.
