= WQPW =

Valdosta, Georgia; United States
- Broadcast area: Valdosta Area
- Frequency: 95.7 MHz
- Branding: 95.7 The Mix

Programming
- Format: Adult contemporary

Ownership
- Owner: Blackcrow Media, LLC
- Sister stations: WKAA, WSTI-FM, WVGA, WVLD, WWRQ-FM, WXHT

History
- First air date: 1977; 49 years ago (as WLGA-FM)
- Former call signs: WLGA-FM (1977–1981); WLGA (1981–1988)

Technical information
- Licensing authority: FCC
- Facility ID: 41336
- Class: C2
- ERP: 32,000 watts
- HAAT: 185.1 meters (607 ft)
- Transmitter coordinates: 30°42′7.00″N 83°6′54.00″W

Links
- Public license information: Public file; LMS
- Webcast: Listen Live
- Website: mymixvaldosta.com

WQPW (95.7 FM) is a radio station broadcasting an adult contemporary format. Licensed to Valdosta, Georgia, United States, the station is currently owned by Blackcrow Media.

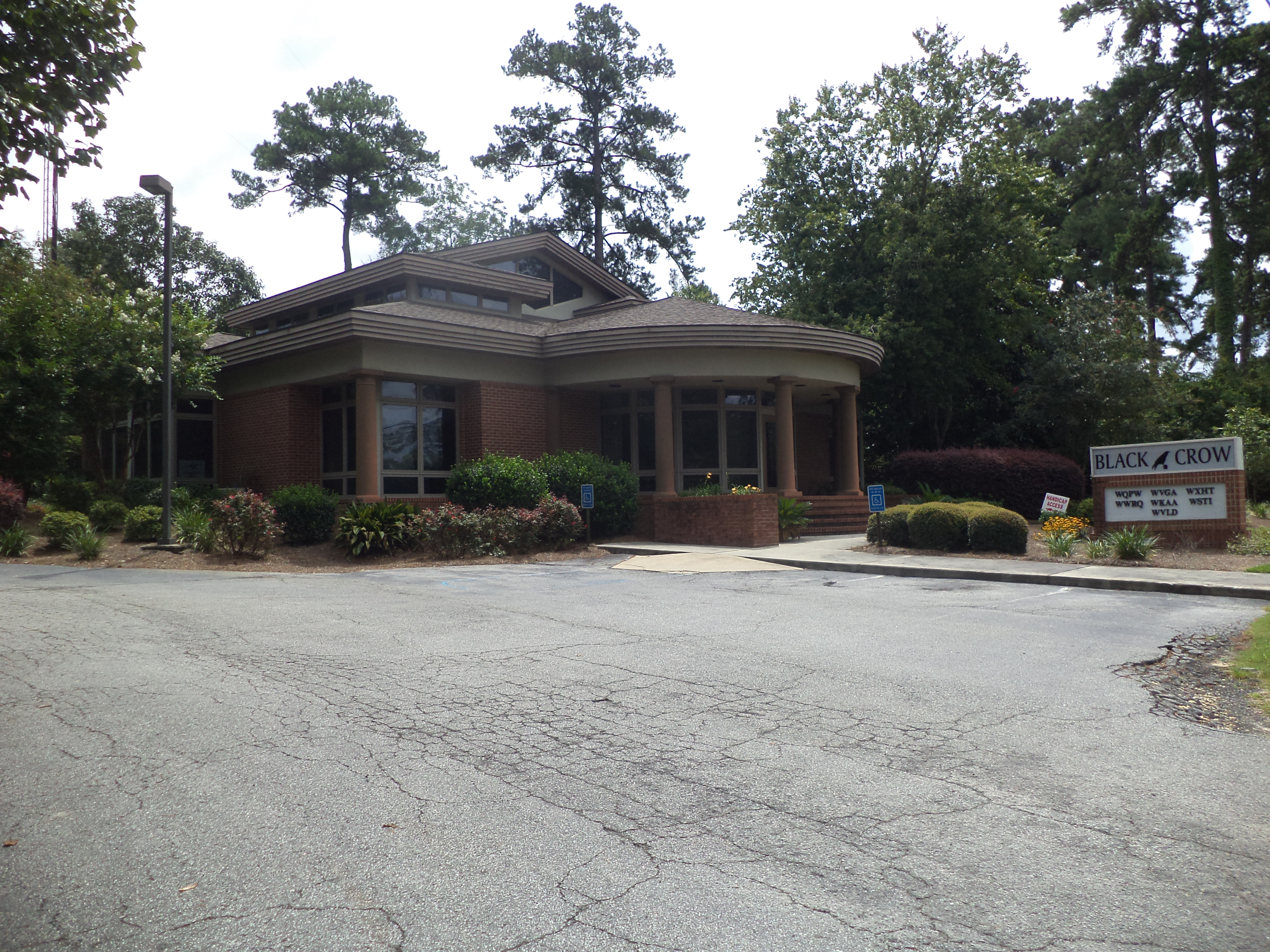
WQPW Studios

== History ==
The station went on the air as WLGA-FM in September 1977, as an easy adult contemporary format. The station shortens its call sign to WLGA on November 30, 1981, and became a full adult contemporary format station which remains to this day. WLGA was Valdosta and southern Georgia's dominant affiliate for Rick Dees Weekly Top 40 in the 1980s, listeners in the area can also listen to the program on Tallahassee's WGLF in a Grade B signal. On October 31, 1988, their call-letters changed to the current WQPW,
