= WGUN =

Radio station in Valdosta, Georgia

Valdosta, Georgia; United States
- Broadcast area: Valdosta area
- Frequency: 950 kHz
- Branding: Magic 950

Programming
- Format: Urban Adult Contemporary
- Affiliations: ABC Radio

Ownership
- Owner: Magic 95 Entertainment; (W.G.O.V., Inc.)

History
- First air date: 1939 (as WGOV)
- Former call signs: WGOV (1939–2013)
- Call sign meaning: Where God Unites Nations

Technical information
- Licensing authority: FCC
- Facility ID: 70511
- Class: D
- Power: 3,500 watts day 63 watts night
- Transmitter coordinates: 30°48′13.00″N 83°21′20.00″W
- Translator: 98.5 W253CE (Valdosta)

Links
- Public license information: Public file; LMS

WGUN (950 AM) is a radio station broadcasting an Urban Adult Contemporary format. Licensed to Valdosta, Georgia, United States, the station is currently owned by Magic 95 Entertainment.

It is the oldest station in the city. Although the original WGOV call letters are sometimes said to have stood for "Good Old Valdosta", the station name actually derived from its founder, Eurith D. Rivers, who served as governor of Georgia from 1937 to 1941; "Dee" Rivers, the former station owner, is his son.

With the inauguration of the Jack the Bellboy program in 1948 with deejay Ben Porter, WGOV was one of the first stations in the country to broadcast rhythm and blues.

On January 25, 2013, the station changed its call sign to WGUN, which had been used by the co-owned station in Decatur (Atlanta) on 1010 kHz.

On February 1, 2014, WGUN changed their format from regional Mexican to urban adult contemporary.
