= WGOV-FM =

Valdosta, Georgia; United States
- Broadcast area: Valdosta area
- Frequency: 96.7 MHz
- Branding: Power 96.7

Programming
- Format: Mainstream Urban
- Affiliations: ABC Radio

Ownership
- Owner: Magic 95 Entertainment; (W.G.O.V., Inc.)

History
- First air date: June 1985 (as WZLS)
- Former call signs: WZLS (1985–1991); WVCM (1991–1992); WYZK (1992–2005); WGOV-FM (2005–2006); WLYX (2006–2011)

Technical information
- Licensing authority: FCC
- Facility ID: 9684
- Class: C2
- ERP: 50,000 watts
- HAAT: 100 meters
- Transmitter coordinates: 30°48′13.00″N 83°21′20.00″W

Links
- Public license information: Public file; LMS
- Website: 96sevenfm.com

WGOV-FM (96.7 FM) is a radio station broadcasting a Mainstream Urban format. Licensed to Valdosta, Georgia, United States, the station is currently owned by Magic 95 Entertainment.

== History ==
The station went on the air as WZLS in 1985 and was changed to WVCM ("Valdosta Country Music") on 1991-05-15. On 1992-02-01, the station changed its call sign to WYZK, on 2005-05-26 to WGOV-FM (to honor Eurith D. Rivers, former Georgia governor and father of "Dee" Rivers, the station owner) (the sister AM station had been WGOV-AM from its origin), on 2006-07-05 to WLYX, and on 2011-08-09 back to the current WGOV-FM.

== Tragedy ==
Shortly after midnight on Saturday morning, January 21, 2012, WGOV-FM disc jockey Stephon Edgerton, known on-air as "Juan Gatti", was shot three times outside the studio (once in the head, twice in the torso) by an assailant, a white man wearing a ski mask. Edgerton called 911 on his cell phone to give the description of the assailant, but soon died of his injuries at the South Georgia Medical Center. His murderer, yet to be identified, is still at large. At the time of his murder, Edgerton had been employed at WGOV-FM for six years, and is survived by his wife and three children.
