= Valdosta Regional Airport =

Airport in Georgia, United States

Valdosta Regional Airport Valdosta Army Auxiliary Airfield

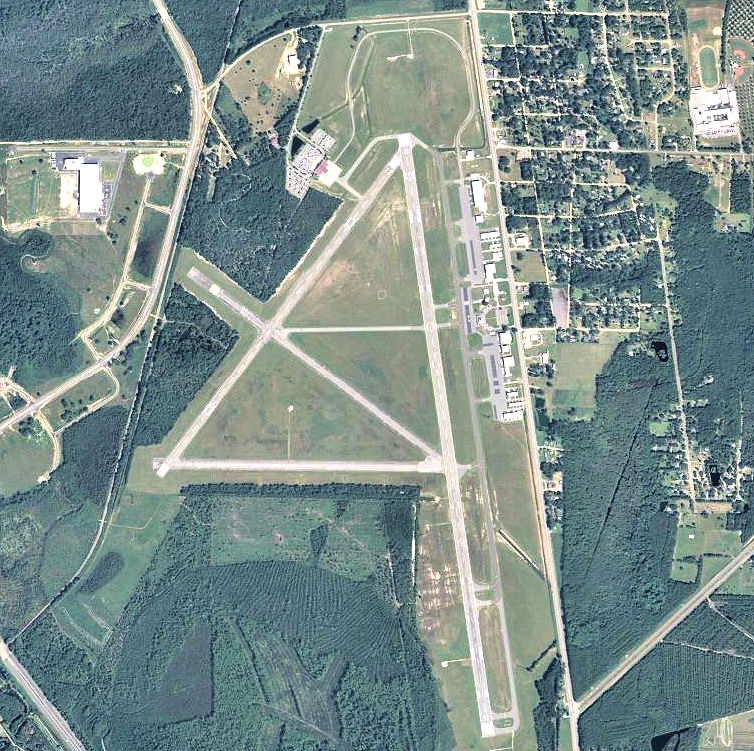
- 2006 USGS airphoto
- IATA: VLD; ICAO: KVLD; FAA LID: VLD

Summary
- Airport type: Public
- Owner: Valdosta-Lowndes County Airport Authority
- Serves: Valdosta, Georgia
- Elevation AMSL: 203 ft / 62 m
- Coordinates: 30°46′53″N 083°16′34″W
- Website: flyvaldosta.com

Map
- Location of airport in Georgia VLD (the United States)

Runways
Direction	Length		Surface
Direction	ft	m	Surface
18/36	8,002	2,439	Asphalt
4/22	5,598	1,706	Asphalt

Statistics (2020)
- Aircraft operations: 21,761
- Based aircraft: 60
- Source: Federal Aviation Administration

Valdosta Regional Airport (IATA: VLD, ICAO: KVLD, FAA LID: VLD) is a public-use airport located three nautical miles (6 km) south of the central business district of Valdosta, a city in Lowndes County, Georgia, United States. It is owned by the Valdosta-Lowndes County Airport Authority. The Valdosta Regional airport is mostly used for general aviation, but is also served by Delta Air Lines, which offers service to Atlanta. The airport also offers free parking.

== Facilities and aircraft ==
Valdosta Regional Airport covers an area of 760 acres (310 ha) at an elevation of 203 feet (62 m) above mean sea level. It has three asphalt paved runways: 17/35 measuring 8,002 x 150 ft. (2,439 x 46 m), 4/22 measuring 5,598 x 100 ft.

After the completion of runway 17/35 in the summer of 2007, Valdosta now has the third longest runway in the state of Georgia (excluding military bases). The longest runway is at Hartsfield-Jackson Atlanta International Airport and the second longest is at the Savannah/Hilton Head International Airport.

For the 12-month period ending May 31, 2007, the Valdosta Regional airport had 73,565 aircraft operations, an average of 201 per day: 55% general aviation, 41% military, 3% air taxi and 1% scheduled commercial. At that time there were 53 aircraft based at this airport: 68% single-engine, 28% multi-engine and 4% jet.

Daily air service is provided to Atlanta by Delta Connection, utilizing Canadair Regional Jet 700 aircraft.

In July 2018, a new passenger boarding bridge, or jet bridge, was added to the terminal building. It remained unused for over a year, after a piece was installed upside down. The bridge is currently in use as of June 2021.

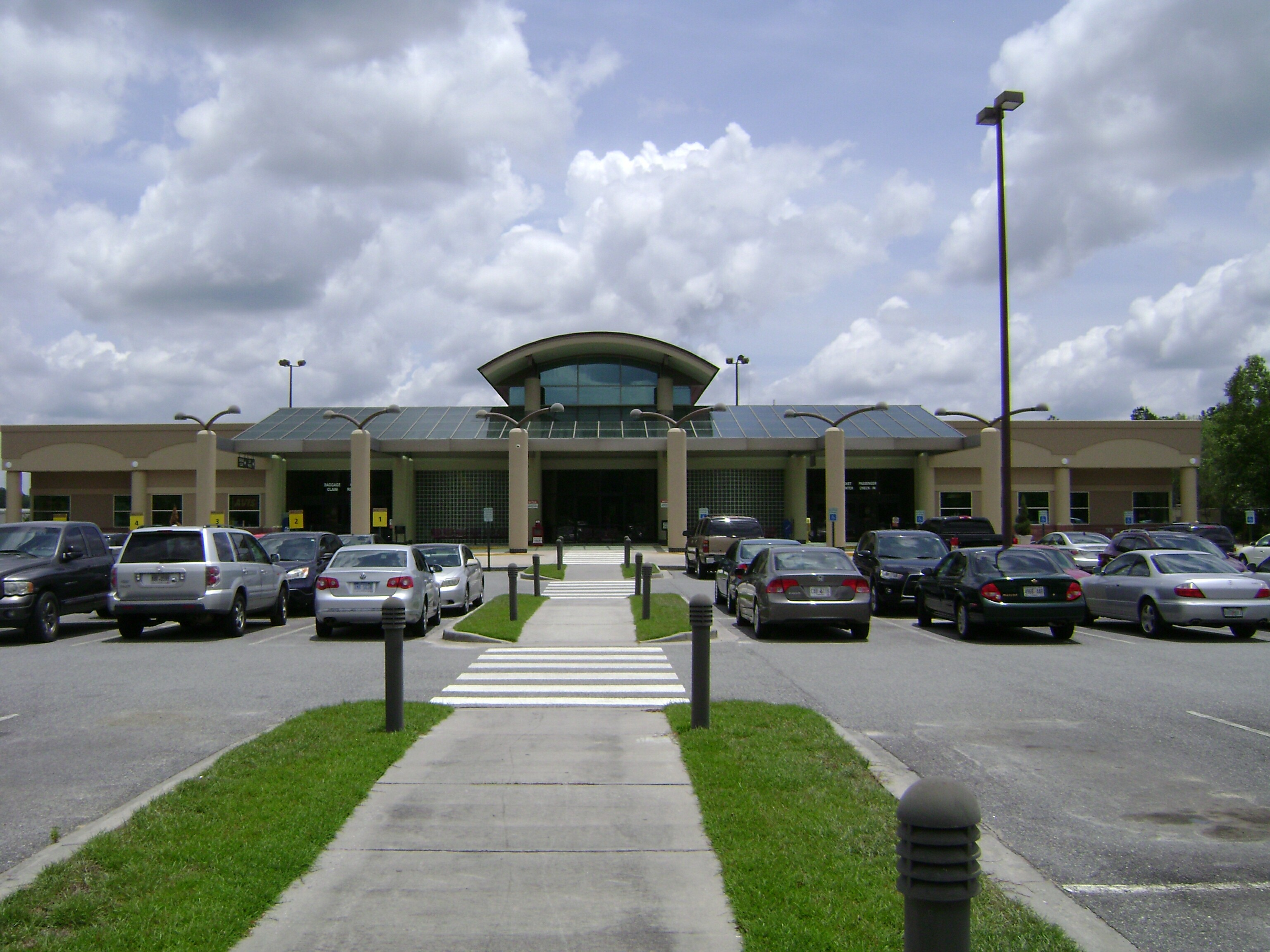
Valdosta Regional Airport entrance

== History ==
Opened in April 1940, the airport was taken over by the United States Army Air Corps in 1941. During World War II, the airport was used as an auxiliary airfield for Moody Army Airfield, supporting the Army pilot training school. The airport was returned to civilian control at the end of the war.

== Airline and destination ==
Airlines	Destinations
Delta Connection	Atlanta

=== Top destinations ===
Busiest domestic routes from VLD (August 2024 – July 2025)
Rank	City	Passengers
1	Atlanta, Georgia	53,580

== See also ==
- Georgia World War II Army Airfields
- List of airports in Georgia (U.S. state)
