= Georgia State Route 333 =

Highway in Georgia, United States

State Route 333
- SR 333 highlighted in red

Route information
- Maintained by GDOT
- Length: 29.2 mi (47.0 km)
- Existed: January 1, 1994–present

Major junctions
- South end: SR 53 at the Florida state line near Madison
- US 84 / US 221 / SR 38 / SR 76 in Quitman; SR 122 in New Rock Hill
- North end: SR 133 southeast of Berlin

Location
- Country: United States
- State: Georgia
- County: Brooks

Highway system
- Georgia State Highway System; Interstate; US; State; Special
← SR 332	→ SR 334

State Route 333 (SR 333) is a 29.2-mile-long (47.0 km) south-to-north state highway located entirely within Brooks County in the south-central part of the U.S. state of Georgia. It connects the Florida state line, where the roadway continues as Florida State Road 53, with New Rock Hill, where it intersects SR 133, via Quitman.

== Route description ==
SR 333 begins at the Florida state line southeast of Quitman, where the roadway continues as Florida State Road 53. The route travels northwest, through Nankin and by Fearnside Lake, to Quitman. There, it has an intersection with US 221/SR 76 (Greenville Highway) in the southern part of the city. The three routes form a concurrency into downtown Quitman, where they intersect US 84/SR 38 (Screven Street). All five highways travel to the east-southeast for three blocks. At Washington Street, SR 76/SR 333 turn left off of the concurrency and travel into the northern part of the city, where SR 76 departs to the east onto Courtland Avenue. Then, SR 333 continues to the north-northwest, passing by Brooks County High School and Crevasse Pond. It then intersects SR 122 in New Rock Hill. Just north of that intersection, it meets its northern terminus, an intersection with SR 133.

SR 333 is not part of the National Highway System, a system of roadways important to the nation's economy, defense, and mobility.

== History ==
The roadway that would eventually become SR 333 was established at least as far back as 1919 as part of SR 35 along SR 333's current path. By the end of 1921, SR 35 between Quitman and SR 333's northern terminus was rerouted to a more southern path. The other one was decommissioned. By the end of 1926, all of SR 35 from the Florida state line to Quitman, and the segment of SR 35 from Quitman to SR 333's northern terminus, were redesignated as part of SR 33. Also, the segment of SR 33 from Quitman to Pebble Hill was paved. By the beginning of 1932, all of the Florida–Quitman segment, and a little segment north of Quitman, were paved. Also, SR 76 traveled concurrently with SR 33 from Quitman to the north end of this paved section. In April of that year, all of SR 33 that would become SR 333 was paved. In early 1941, SR 76 was rerouted to the east in Quitman, along SR 38. By the end of 1946, either SR 33 or SR 76 was rerouted in Quitman, so that they once again traveled concurrently through the city. By the middle of 1957, US 221 was designated through Quitman, as it travels today. In 1993, all of SR 33 from the Florida state line to north of New Rock Hill was redesignated as SR 333.

== Major intersections ==
The entire route is in Brooks County.

Location	mi	km	Destinations	Notes
	0.0	0.0	SR 53 south – Madison, Fla	Continuation beyond Florida state line
Quitman	11.2	18.0	US 221 south / SR 76 west (Greenville Highway) – Greenville, Perry	Southern end of US 221 and SR 76 concurrencies
Quitman	12.1	19.5	US 84 west / SR 38 west (West Screven Street) – Thomasville, Cairo	Southern end of US 84/SR 38 concurrency
Quitman	12.3	19.8	US 84 east / US 221 north / SR 38 east (East Screven Street) – Valdosta, Lakeland, Homerville, Waycross	Northern end of US 221 and US 84/SR 38 concurrencies
Quitman	13.2	21.2	SR 76 east (East Courtland Avenue) – Morven, Adel	Northern end of SR 76 concurrency
New Rock Hill	27.9	44.9	SR 122 – Pavo, Barney	
	29.2	47.0	SR 133 (Valdosta Highway) – Moultrie	Northern terminus
1.000 mi = 1.609 km; 1.000 km = 0.621 mi: Concurrency terminus
