= Newnan Springs, Georgia =

Unincorporated community in the state of Georgia

Coordinates: 34°58′39″N 85°14′40″W

Newnan Springs is an unincorporated community in Catoosa County, in the U.S. state of Georgia.

== Etymology ==
The community was named for Daniel Newnan.
