= May 1918 lynchings =

Violence following a murder in Georgia

On May 16, 1918, a plantation owner was murdered, prompting a manhunt which resulted in a series of lynchings in May 1918 in southern Georgia, United States. White people killed at least 13 black people during the next two weeks. Among those killed were Hazel "Hayes" Turner and his wife, Mary Turner. Hayes was killed on May 18, and the next day (May 19) his pregnant wife Mary was strung up by her feet, doused with gasoline and oil, then set on fire. Mary's unborn child was cut from her abdomen and stomped to death. Her body was then repeatedly shot. No one was ever convicted of her lynching.

These lynchings are examples of the racially motivated mob violence by white people against black people in the American South, especially during 1880 to 1930, the peak of lynchings. Brooks County in Georgia, and Georgia among the states, had the highest rates of lynching in the nation during this period.

The NAACP referred to the murder of Mary Turner in its anti-lynching campaigns of the 1920s, 1930s and 1940s. In the lynching era from 1880 to 1930, the great majority of these murders were committed in the South. Most of the thousands of individuals lynched in the United States were Black, and most were men, but at least 120 Black women were known to have been lynched between 1865 and 1965.

== Background ==
The lynchings followed in response to the murder of Hampton Smith. Hampton Smith was a 25-year-old (although newspaper accounts covering his death inaccurately put his age at 31) married white planter who owned the Old Joyce Place, a large plantation near Morven, Georgia. He was known among black workers for being an abusive boss, making it difficult for him to recruit farm labor. Smith resolved the labor shortage (as did many planters) through using convict labor; he would pay the fees that black men were assessed for infractions and lease their labor for a period of time, paying the local jurisdiction the fees. He was responsible for food and board of such workers. Among the workers whom Smith gained this way was Sidney Johnson, after paying the police his $30 fine (a high payment for a farm worker), assessed after his conviction for "playing dice." Authorities exercised little oversight related to convict leasing, and the black men were often abused in what journalist Douglas Blackmon has called "slavery by another name".

Johnson endured several beatings at the hands of Smith, including a severe one after refusing to work while sick. Smith also had a violent history with other black workers. He had beaten Mary Turner, and after this incident her husband, Hayes Turner, threatened Smith. Turner was convicted by an all-white jury and sentenced to a chain gang.

Johnson shot Smith and his wife through a window in their house, killing Smith and wounding his wife. He fled the scene, hiding successfully in Valdosta, Georgia for several days. A large manhunt was conducted by a white mob, mostly in Brooks County.

== Lynchings ==
During the manhunt, white people killed at least 13 black people during the next two weeks. On May 17, Will Head and Will Thompson were seized in two different areas; that night Head was lynched near Troupville in neighboring Lowndes County, and Thompson near Barney in Brooks County. Walter F. White, an investigator for the NAACP, was told by mob participants that the bodies of the men were riddled with more than 700 bullets. Julius Jones was also captured and lynched near Barney.

Chime Riley was a black man at first rumored to have left Brooks County. He was found to have been lynched, although he had no known connection to Smith. He was thrown into the Little River in Brooks County to drown near Barney; turpentine cups were tied to his hands and legs to weigh him down.

Simon Schuman (also seen as Shuman) was taken from his house during the unrest and according to Walter White reportedly never seen again, although he had no connection to Smith. His family was driven out of the house, and the interior was destroyed. Schuman was believed by most later historians to have been lynched by white people in this rampage. Walter White's report related to Schuman's disappearance was inaccurate. Newspaper accounts from a month after the May rampage can confirm that Schuman was arrested by Brooks County authorities in late June 1918 after he was implicated in the murder of Hampton Smith by a man named "Shorty" Ford, then in custody in Jacksonville, Florida on charges related to Smith's murder as well. On June 25, 1918, Schuman was removed from Brooks County Jail to an unknown location to avoid being lynched. Schuman survived the ordeal and moved to Albany, Georgia shortly afterward.

Sidney Johnson, who murdered Smith, reached Valdosta, the county seat of Lowndes County, where he hid for a few days. When he appealed to another black man for food, that man notified the police. Chief Calvin Dampier took officers armed with high-powered rifles to the house (among them were his brother), where they engaged in a shootout with Johnson, known to be armed with a shotgun and pistol. After the shooting stopped, the police finally entered the house, finding Johnson dead. He had wounded the two Dampier brothers and Dixon Smith. A mob had gathered and, deprived of the chance to lynch Johnson, mutilated his body, and dragged it behind a car in a procession down Patterson Street and out to Morven. There they hanged the body from a tree (near the scene of Smith's murder) and burned it.

=== Hayes and Mary Turner ===
Among the men picked up in the hunt for Smith's killer was Hayes Turner (August 15, 1892 – May 18, 1918), an African American man, known to have had conflict with Smith, and who was lynched after being accused of murder in Lowndes County, Georgia. His lynching was reported by The Spokesman-Review on May 20, 1918. When his wife, Mary Turner, denounced the murder and threatened legal action, she was lynched along with their unborn baby.

Hayes Turner was arrested on the morning of Saturday, May 18, and placed in the jail in Valdosta, the county seat of Lowndes County. Later in the day, County Sheriff Wade and a clerk of court took him out, ostensibly to move him to Quitman, the county seat of Brooks County. Along the way, Turner was taken by a mob and lynched near the Okapilco Creek in Brooks County, about 3 1/2 miles from town. His body was left hanging from the tree over the weekend and not cut down until Monday.

Another black man was lynched that day near the Old Camp Ground; he may have been Eugene Rice. Newspaper reports identified him as a victim of the mob; he was never associated with Smith's murder in any way.

Approximately a week later, the bodies of three unidentified black men were taken from the Little River, below Barney. It was not clear if they were new or old victims. At the time of the NAACP's investigation by Walter White soon after these events (see below), the bodies had disappeared from police custody without confirmation of identity.

After Hayes Turner was murdered, his distraught wife Mary, who was eight months pregnant, publicly denounced her husband's lynching. She denied that her husband had been involved in Smith's killing, and threatened to have members of the mob arrested. The mob turned against her, determined to "teach her a lesson" and also due to hidden fears about what could happen to them. Although she fled, Mary Turner was captured at noon on May 19. The mob of several hundred took her to the bank in Brooks County near Folsom Bridge, over the Little River, which forms the border with Lowndes County.

According to investigator Walter F. White of the NAACP, Mary Turner was tied and hung upside down by the ankles, her clothes soaked with gasoline, and burned from her body. Her belly was slit open with a knife like those used "in splitting hogs." Her "unborn babe" fell to the ground and gave "two feeble cries." Its head was crushed by a member of the mob with his heel to hide any evidence of what had happened, the crowd then shot hundreds of bullets into Turner's body. Mary Turner was cut down and buried with her child near the tree, with a whiskey bottle marking the grave. The Atlanta Constitution published an article with the subheadline: "Fury of the People Is Unrestrained."

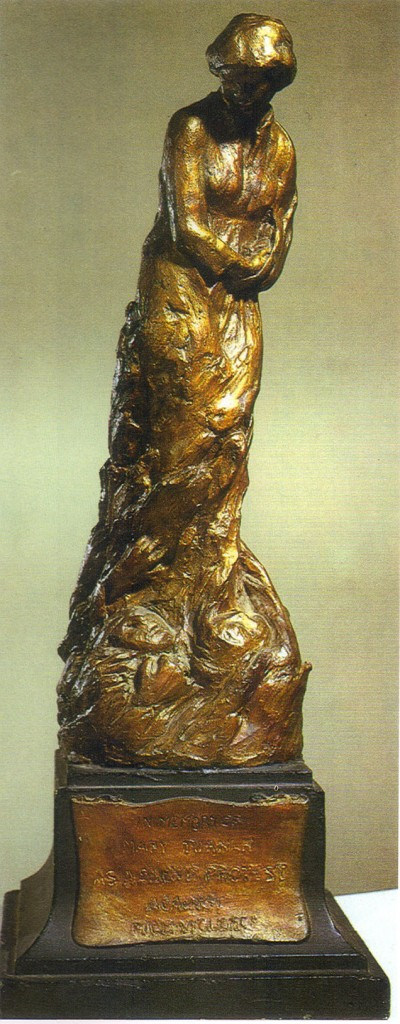
Meta Vaux Warrick Fuller, Mary Turner, painted plaster sculpture, 1919

Mary Turner (c. 1885 – 19 May 1918) was a young, married black woman and mother of three—including an unborn child—who was lynched by a white mob in Lowndes County, Georgia, for having protested the lynching death of her husband Hazel "Hayes" Turner the day before in Brooks County. She was eight months pregnant, and her baby was cut from her body and killed by stomping. They were followed by the murders of 11 more black men by a white mob in Brooks and neighboring Lowndes counties during a manhunt and lynching rampage.

=== Early life ===
Mary Hattie Graham was born circa 1885 to Perry Graham and Elizabeth "Betsy" Johnson, in Brooks County, Georgia. She had an older sister Pearl, and two younger brothers, named Perry and Otha. Sources differ on the exact year of her birth. Most newspaper accounts covering the lynching in 1918 do not mention her age at all. The report by Walter White in The Crisis in September 1918 also does not mention her age. In general, historians prior to the 2000s did not make a reference to her age when they wrote about her. In 2008, an article by Julie Buckner Armstrong put her age at 19, but a later historian notes that she did not cite the source of the information. The Mary Turner Project originally put her age at 21 at her death, implying a birth year of circa 1897. Twenty-one was the age used for the historical marker erected by the Mary Turner Project in 2010. A historian has noted the link between the erection of the marker in 2010 and the subsequent widespread use of 21 as her age at her death in modern newspaper accounts. The same historian has contacted Mark Patrick George, the former director of the Mary Turner Project, and discovered that 21 was used before the family of Mary Turner contacted the project and supplied the more accurate birth year of 1885. George also stated that the project has just not gotten around to correcting the information on the Mary Turner Project website. The most current research by a historian into her early life puts her birth at circa 1885, possibly December 1884.

At some point, Mary Hattie Graham gave birth to a son named Willie Lloyd Smith. His birth year varies in records between 1907 and 1910. The identity of his father is currently unknown. He was sometimes referred to by family members as Ocie Lee. Mary Hattie Graham also gave birth to a daughter named Leaster. The identity of her father is also unknown. Mary Hattie Graham married Hazel "Hayes" Turner on 11 February 1917, in Colquitt County, Georgia. He had been previously married. It is unknown if he had any children from his previous marriage.

== Aftermath ==
Following the lynchings, more than 500 black residents fled the area to escape the violence, although white people threatened to kill black workers who tried to leave. The lynching murders of Hayes and Mary Turner, and several other black people, caused a brief national outcry. They were highlighted in the NAACP's unsuccessful campaigns for Congress to pass federal anti-lynching legislation.

A man named Leamon Wright was arrested in late May 1918 in Jacksonville, Florida. In 1919, he was put on trial in Savannah, Georgia, instead of Brooks County, Georgia for safety reasons, on charges of murdering Hampton Smith and assaulting his wife. Shortly before the trial began, a group of men took an African-American prisoner from the Hamilton County Jail in Jasper, Florida claiming that they had the legal authority to do so. The man was later found dead in the Withlacoochee River, west of Valdosta, bound and with a gunshot wound to the head. "Buried outside the cemetery, 50 feet to the east and marked with wooden cross. Once had a fence around it but it had deteriorated badly and was removed. Local lore has it that this was a man found dead in the nearby Withlacoochee River. (Per Thomas McCulley) A newspaper account reported the incident as being yet another death related to the Hampton Smith case. Wright was found guilty in two separate trials. His defense attorneys argued that the whole thing was a case of mistaken identity and that the real "Shorty" Ford had been taken from a jail and drowned. Hampton Smith's father Dixon Smith identified Wright as being one and the same as the "Shorty" Ford responsible for his son's death. Leamon Wright was executed by hanging in Chatham County Jail on June 3, 1921. Newspapers noted it was Jefferson Davis's birthday. Wright went to his death claiming he was innocent.

=== Press accounts ===
White and black newspapers covered the lynching of Turner differently; white newspapers failed to mention her pregnancy or the brutal murder of her unborn baby, while black reports emphasized it. After the incident, the Associated Press wrote that Mary Turner had made "unwise remarks" about the murder of her husband, and that "the people, in their indignant mood, took exception to her remarks, as well as her attitude".

=== Investigation ===
Walter F. White, NAACP assistant secretary, went to south Georgia to conduct an investigation into the Brooks-Lowndes lynchings. While Georgia Governor Hugh Dorsey was given a complete report of his investigation of the Turner murders, which included the names of two instigators and 15 participants, no one was ever charged for the Turner killings. This was typical of conditions in the South, when most lynchings were not prosecuted.

In 1922, Congressman Leonidas C. Dyer of St. Louis, Missouri, introduced the Dyer Anti-Lynching Bill into the U.S. House of Representatives, which passed it overwhelmingly. However, the Democratic block of the Solid South in the Senate filibustered and prevented the bill from coming to a vote in 1922, 1923 and once more in 1924.

== Legacy ==
=== Denial ===
By the late 1990s, the Turner lynchings had attracted the renewed attention of historians. While researching the lynchings in 1998, historian Julie Buckner Armstrong visited Carnegie Lowndes County Historical Society and Museum and the Brooks County Museum and Cultural Center. The directors at the time denied having any knowledge of the lynchings and claimed that the counties never had any lynchings. Later directors were more helpful in investigating their holdings for material about the lynchings.

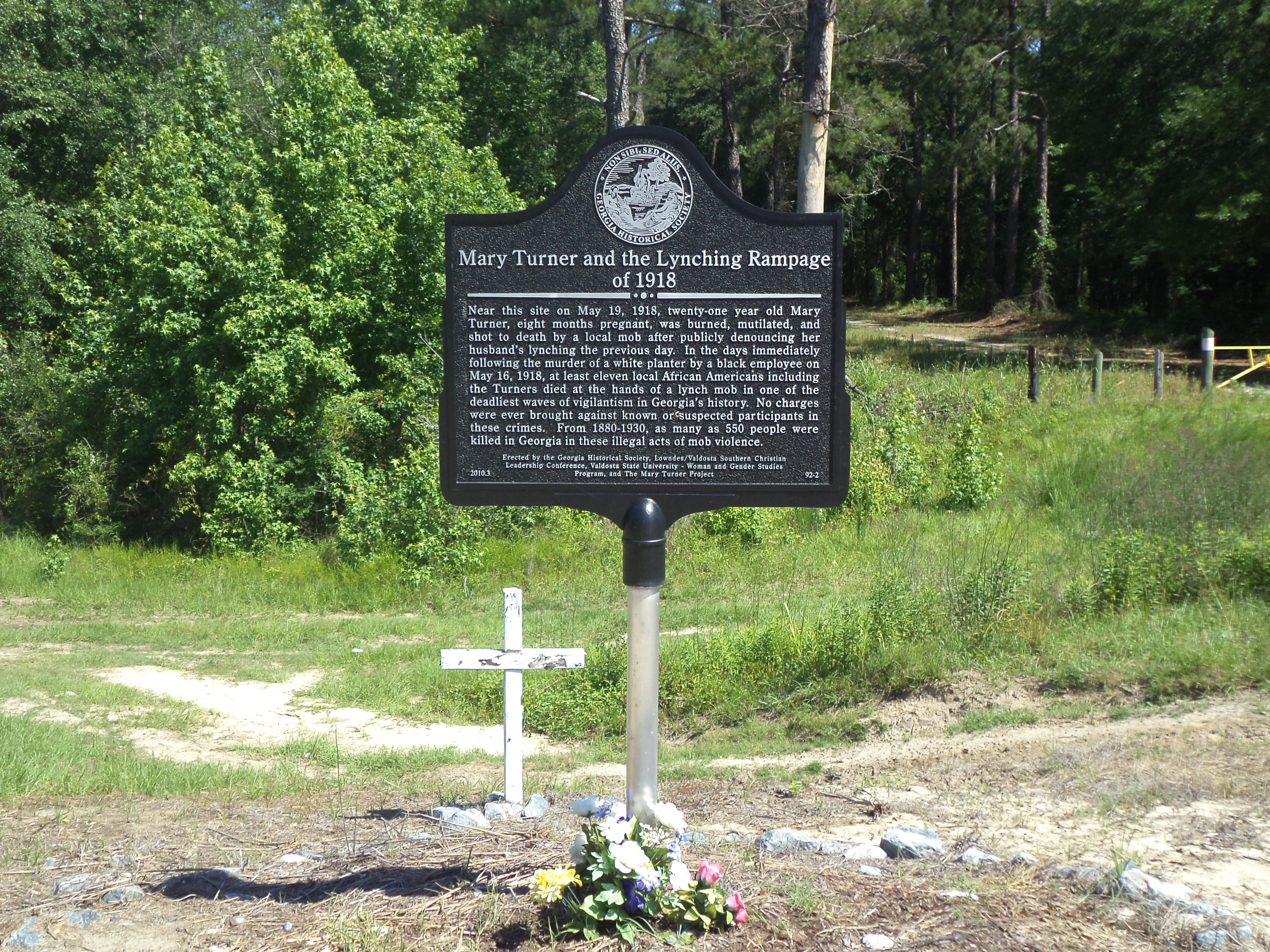
Historical marker in Lowndes County, Georgia

=== Recognition ===
In 2008, the Mary Turner Project was formed. It is "a diverse, grassroots volunteer collective of students, educators, and local community members who are committed to racial justice and racial healing." They have conducted memorial events, lectures, and teaching sessions to educate students and citizens about the events of the May 1918 lynchings, and the larger stories of racial injustice. They helped gain support for a state historical marker to be installed that memorializes Mary Turner and these events. It was jointly sponsored by the Georgia Historical Society, the Southern Christian Leadership Conference, and other groups.

On 15 May 2010, a historical marker memorializing "Mary Turner and the Lynching Rampage" was placed near the lynching site in Lowndes County and dedicated. The plaque includes a description of the associated murders of black people by white mobs in 1918, especially the lynchings of the Turners. In July 2013, the plaque was found to have five bullet holes shot by an unknown vandal. Since 2013, the plaque now has as many as 27 bullet holes and more recently, was struck multiple times by "some kind of off-road vehicle," Mark Patrick George, coordinator for the Mary Turner Project, announced in October 2020. The historical marker has since been moved to the grounds of Webb Miller Community Church in Hahira, five miles away from the original site.

== Representation in other media ==
- Jean Toomer's 1923 novel Cane refers to the Mary Turner lynching in the "Kabnis" section, noting the lynching of Mame Lamkins.
- Mary Turner's death by lynching influenced "Goldie," a short story by Angelina Weld Grimké.
- Jonathan Grant wrote the novel Brambleman (2012) about these events. It won the 2013 Benjamin Franklin Award for popular fiction.
- Lekethia Dalcoe's 2016 play A Small Oak Tree Runs Red, which received a highly acclaimed world premiere at the Congo Square Theatre in Chicago, explored the story of Turner, her husband, and Sidney Johnson.
- John Gray's Straw Dogs contains a short essay entitled Conscience which opens with a description of the execution of Tom Hose, a black Georgian, in 1899, and continues to explore the murder of Mary Turner and her family.
- The 2019 song "Mary Turner Mary Turner" by electronic and avant-garde music group Xiu Xiu, from their album Girl with Basket of Fruit, contains lyrics that go into detail about the acts of violence committed against the Turner family.

== See also ==
- Nadir of American race relations
- Mass racial violence in the United States: War and Inter-War Period: 1914 - 1945
- Lynching of Jesse Washington
