= Brooks County, Georgia =

County in Georgia, United States

- County
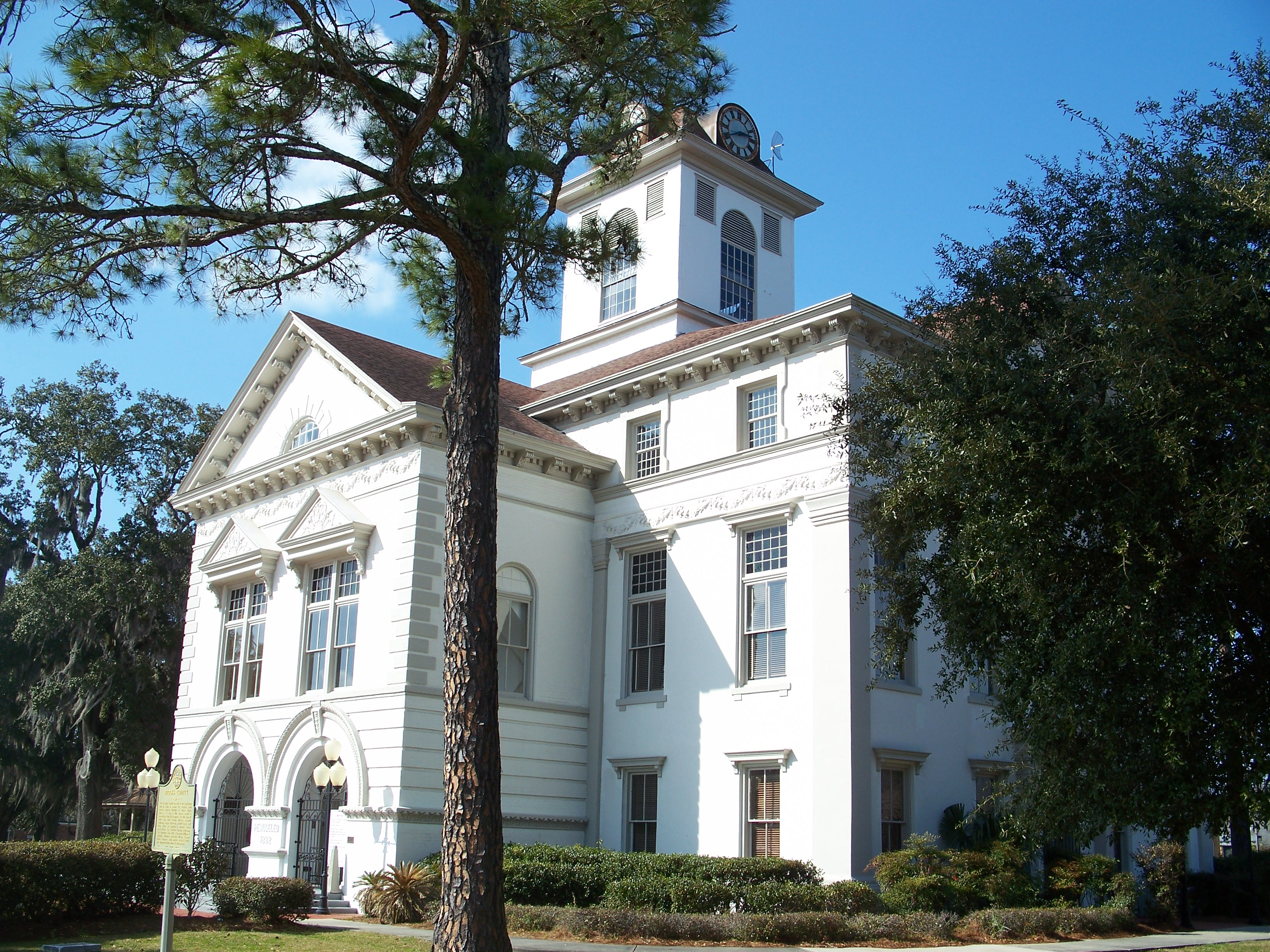
- Brooks County Courthouse in Quitman

- Seal

- Location within the U.S. state of Georgia
- Coordinates: 30°43′44″N 83°42′54″W
- Country: United States
- State: Georgia
- Founded: December 11, 1858; 167 years ago
- Named for: Preston Brooks
- Seat: Quitman
- Largest city: Quitman

Area
  - Total: 498 sq mi (1,290 km^{2})
  - Land: 493 sq mi (1,280 km^{2})
  - Water: 4.8 sq mi (12 km^{2}) 1.0%

Population (2020)
  - Total: 16,301
  - Estimate (2025): 16,101 ▼
  - Density: 33.1/sq mi (12.8/km^{2})
- Time zone: UTC−5 (Eastern)
  - Summer (DST): UTC−4 (EDT)
- Congressional district: 8th
- Website: www.brookscountyga.gov

Brooks County is a county located in the U.S. state of Georgia, on its southern border with Florida. As of the 2020 census, the population was 16,301. The county seat is Quitman. The county was created in 1858 from portions of Lowndes and Thomas counties by an act of the Georgia General Assembly and was named for pro-slavery U.S. Representative Preston Brooks, after he severely beat abolitionist Senator Charles Sumner with a cane for delivering a speech attacking slavery. Brooks County is included in the Valdosta metropolitan area.

== History ==
In the peak lynching era, from 1880 to 1930, this county had 20 lynchings, the third-highest number of any county in Georgia, which was the state with the highest number of lynchings in the country. All of the victims in Georgia were black, including at least 13 killed in the May 1918 lynching rampage in this county, starting with the murders of Hayes Turner, and shortly after of his pregnant wife Mary Turner.

=== Native Americans and the Spanish ===
Historic Native peoples occupying the area at the time of European encounter were the Apalachee and the Lower Creek. The first Europeans in what is now Brooks County were Spanish missionaries from their colony in Florida, who arrived around 1570.

=== Early history ===
The area that was to become Brooks County was first opened up to European-American settlement in 1818 when Irwin County was established. Coffee Road was built through the region in the 1820s. Lowndes County's first court session was held at the tavern owned by Sion Hall on the Coffee Road, near what is now Morven, Georgia in Brooks County.

=== Establishment ===
Many residents of Lowndes County were unhappy when the Atlantic and Gulf Railroad announced June 17, 1858, that they had selected a planned route that would bypass Troupville, the county seat. On June 22 at 3:00 am, the Lowndes County courthouse at Troupville was set aflame by William B. Crawford, who fled to South Carolina after being released on bond.

On August 9, a meeting convened in the academy building in Troupville, at which residents decided to divide Lowndes and create a new county to the west of the Withlacoochee River, to be called Brooks County.

On December 11, 1858, Brooks County was officially organized by the state legislature from parts of Lowndes and Thomas counties. It was named for Preston Brooks, a member of Congress prior to the Civil War. He was very popular in the South because of his 1856 caning of abolitionist senator Charles Sumner, and the citizens of Georgia wanted to honor him. Brooksville, Florida, and Brooksville, Virginia, also named or renamed themselves for Brooks.

The county had been developed along the waterways for cotton plantations, dependent on enslaved laborers, many of whom were transported to the South in the domestic slave trade during the Antebellum years. Cotton brought a high return from local and international markets, making large planters wealthy. At the time of the 1860 federal census, Brooks County had a white population of 3,067, a Free people of color population of 2, and a slave population of 3,282. The Atlantic and Gulf Railroad reached Quitman, the county seat, on October 23, 1860.

=== Civil War ===
During the Civil War, the county was the main producer of food for the Confederacy; it became known as the "Smokehouse of the Confederacy."

Some Confederate Army regiments were raised from the men of Brooks County. Plantation owners, county officials, and slave patrol members were exempt from military conscription, which caused some contention between the different economic classes in Brooks County.

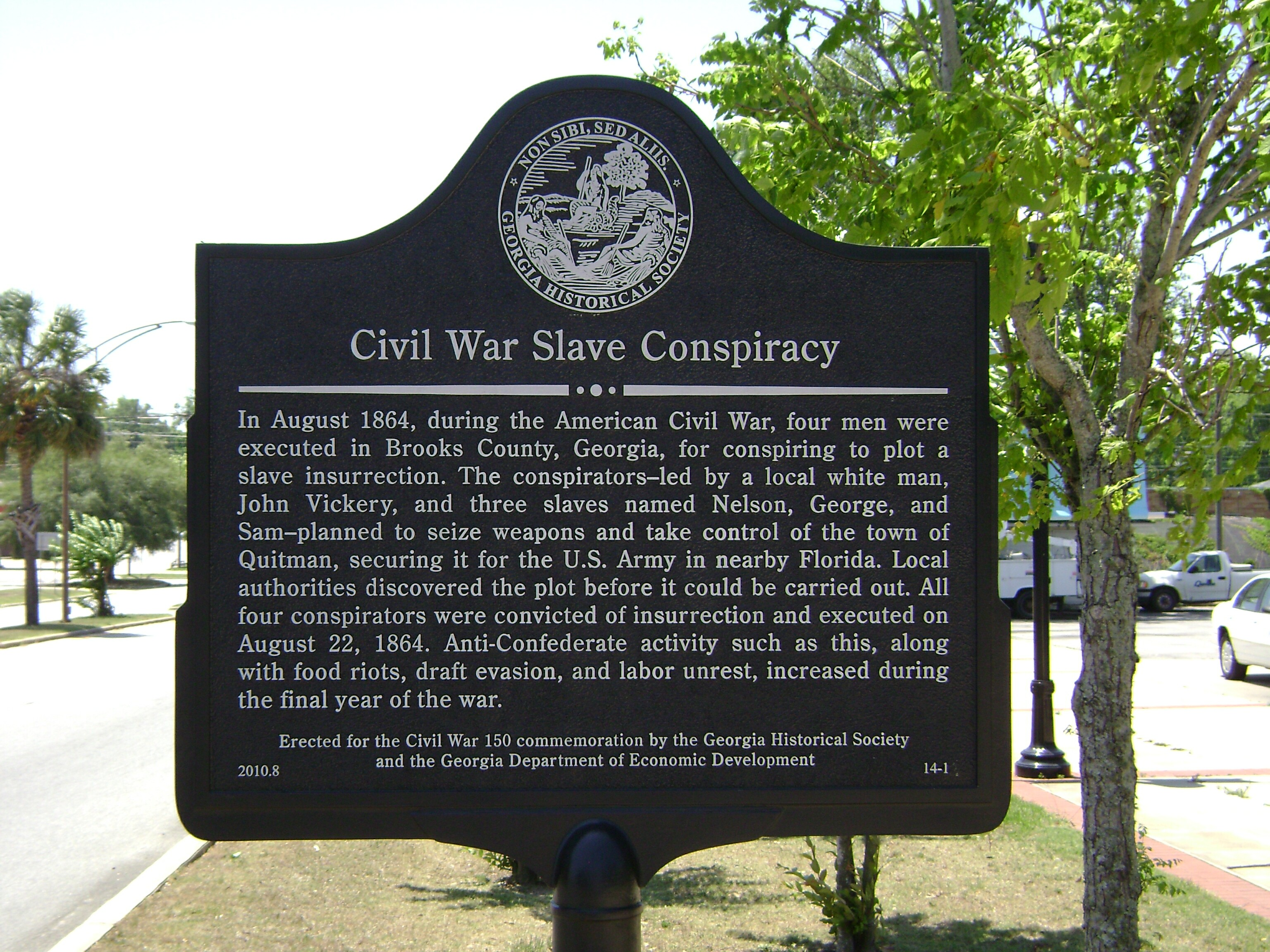
Georgia Historical Marker for the Civil War Slave Conspiracy

In August 1864, a local white man named John Vickery began plotting a slave rebellion. His plan called for killing the slave owners, stealing what weapons they could find, setting fire to Quitman, going to Madison, Florida, burning the town, getting help from Union troops from the Gulf Coast, and then returning to Quitman. On the evening before the rebellion, a slave was arrested for theft and interrogated. Vickery was soon arrested as well. Vickery and four slave suspects were given a military trial by the local militia. Two Confederate deserters from Florida were also believed to have been involved, but were not caught by the time of the trial.

On August 23, 1864, at 6:00 p.m., Vickery, and slaves Sam, Nelson, and George were publicly hanged in Quitman. The court could not reach a decision on the guilt of Warren, a slave held by Buford Elliot.

=== Post-Reconstruction and imposition of Jim Crow ===
After the war, many freedmen worked as sharecroppers or tenant farmers. Following the war and the Reconstruction era, Brooks County was one of the areas with a high rate of racial violence by whites against blacks. Its 20 deaths make it the county in Georgia that had the third-highest number of lynchings from 1870 to 1950. (From 1880 to 1930, Georgia had the highest number of such extrajudicial murders in the country). See, for example, the Brooks County race war of 1894.

In May 1918, at least 13 African Americans were killed during a white manhunt and rampage after Sidney Johnson killed an abusive white planter. Johnson had been forced to work for the man under the state's abusive convict lease system. Among those killed were Hayes Turner, and the next day his wife Mary Turner, who was eight months pregnant. They were the parents of two children. Mary Turner had condemned the mob's killing of her husband. She was abducted by the mob in Brooks County and brutally murdered at Folsom's Bridge on the Little River on the Lowndes County side; her unborn child was cut from her body and killed separately. During the next two weeks, at least another eleven blacks were killed by the mob. Johnson was killed in a shootout with police. As many as 500 African Americans fled Lowndes and Brooks counties to escape future violence.

Mary Turner's lynching drew widespread condemnation nationally. It was a catalyst for the Anti-Lynching Crusaders campaign for the 1922 Dyer Bill, sponsored by Leonidas Dyer of St. Louis. It proposed to make lynching a federal crime, as southern states essentially never prosecuted the crimes. The Solid South Democratic block of white senators consistently defeated such legislation, aided by having disenfranchised most black voters in the South. In 2010, a state historical marker, encaptioned "Mary Turner and the Lynching Rampage," was installed at Folsom's Bridge in Lowndes County to commemorate these atrocities.

=== Modern history ===
In the 21st century, Brooks County is classified as being in the Plantation Trace tourist region.

== Historical sites ==
- The Brooks County Courthouse was constructed in 1864 in the county seat of Quitman, Georgia. It was designed by architect John Wind. Brooks County officials paid for the structure with $14,958 in Confederate money. The currency soon became useless.
- The Brooks County Museum and Cultural Center, formerly a library, was adapted for use as a cultural center. It is the site of a series of music, art, and culinary events throughout the year.

== Geography ==
According to the U.S. Census Bureau, the county has a total area of 498 square miles (1,290 km^{2}), of which 493 square miles (1,280 km^{2}) is land and 4.8 square miles (12 km^{2}) (1.0%) is water.

The eastern boundary of the county is made up of the Little River (Withlacoochee River) and the Withlacoochee River, which together meander along a distance of over 100 miles (160 km) to form that boundary. These river boundaries are shared with Cook and Lowndes counties. The southern boundary of the county has a mutual east–west interface of about 25 miles (40 km) with Florida, although it is not continuous. The county is discontinuous along the Florida border, with the easternmost section about a mile east of the rest of the county. This section presently consists of one parcel, recorded as 350 acres (1.4 km^{2}), although it has a border with Florida of almost 2 miles (3.2 km). The county shares a north–south boundary about 26 miles (42 km) in length with Thomas County to the west. It also shares an east–west boundary of 10 miles (16 km) and a north–south boundary of 3 miles (4.8 km) with Colquitt County to the northwest. The county has over 10,000 parcels of land, with 19 over 2,000 acres (8.1 km^{2}) and two more than 5,000 acres (20 km^{2}).

The county is home to several endangered plant and animal species, including the Pond Spicebush, the Wood Stork, and the Eastern Indigo snake.

The majority of Brooks County, including the northwestern portion, all of central Brooks County, and the southeastern corner, is located in the Withlacoochee River sub-basin of the Suwannee River basin. Most of the southern edge of the county is located in the Aucilla River sub-basin of the larger Aucilla-Wacissa basin. The county's northeastern portion, centered on Morven and including Barney, is located in the Little River sub-basin of the same Suwannee River basin.

=== Adjacent counties ===
- Cook County - northeast (created 1918 from Berrien County)
- Lowndes County - east (created 1825 from Irwin County)
- Madison County, Florida - southeast
- Jefferson County, Florida - southwest
- Thomas County - west (created 1825 from Early and Decatur counties)
- Colquitt County - northwest (created in 1856 from Thomas and Lowndes counties)

=== Communities ===
==== Cities ====
- Barwick (partly in Thomas County, Georgia)
- Morven
- Pavo (partly in Thomas County, Georgia)
- Quitman

==== Census-designated place ====
- Dixie

==== Unincorporated communities ====
- Barney
- Dixie
- Grooverville
- Nankin
- Pidcock

== Demographics ==
Historical population
Census	Pop.	Note	%±
1860	6,356		—
1870	8,342		31.2%
1880	11,727		40.6%
1890	13,979		19.2%
1900	18,606		33.1%
1910	23,832		28.1%
1920	24,538		3.0%
1930	21,330		−13.1%
1940	20,497		−3.9%
1950	18,169		−11.4%
1960	15,292		−15.8%
1970	13,739		−10.2%
1980	15,255		11.0%
1990	15,398		0.9%
2000	16,450		6.8%
2010	16,243		−1.3%
2020	16,301		0.4%
2025 (est.)	16,101	▼	−1.2%
U.S. Decennial Census; 1790-1880 1890-1910; 1920-1930 1930-1940; 1940-1950 1960-1980; 1980-2000 2010

=== Racial and ethnic composition ===
Brooks County, Georgia – Racial and ethnic composition Note: the US Census treats Hispanic/Latino as an ethnic category. This table excludes Latinos from the racial categories and assigns them to a separate category. Hispanics/Latinos may be of any race.
Race / Ethnicity (NH = Non-Hispanic)	Pop 1980	Pop 1990	Pop 2000	Pop 2010	Pop 2020	% 1980	% 1990	% 2000	% 2010	% 2020
White alone (NH)	8,364	8,725	9,303	9,425	9,066	54.83%	56.66%	56.55%	58.02%	55.62%
Black or African American alone (NH)	6,678	6,365	6,429	5,695	5,684	43.78%	41.34%	39.08%	35.06%	34.87%
Native American or Alaska Native alone (NH)	12	27	35	48	24	0.08%	0.18%	0.21%	0.30%	0.15%
Asian alone (NH)	27	27	38	51	67	0.18%	0.18%	0.23%	0.31%	0.41%
Native Hawaiian or Pacific Islander alone (NH)	x	x	1	5	6	x	x	0.01%	0.03%	0.04%
Other race alone (NH)	5	1	8	17	42	0.03%	0.01%	0.05%	0.10%	0.26%
Mixed race or Multiracial (NH)	x	x	131	149	457	x	x	0.80%	0.92%	2.80%
Hispanic or Latino (any race)	169	253	505	853	955	1.11%	1.64%	3.07%	5.25%	5.86%
Total	15,255	15,398	16,450	16,243	16,301	100.00%	100.00%	100.00%	100.00%	100.00%

=== 2020 census ===
As of the 2020 census, the county had a population of 16,301, 6,359 households, and 4,015 families residing in the county. Of the residents, 21.8% were under the age of 18 and 21.4% were 65 years of age or older; the median age was 44.1 years. For every 100 females there were 91.8 males, and for every 100 females age 18 and over there were 89.9 males. 0.0% of residents lived in urban areas and 100.0% lived in rural areas.

The racial makeup of the county was 57.1% White, 35.1% Black or African American, 0.3% American Indian and Alaska Native, 0.4% Asian, 0.0% Native Hawaiian and Pacific Islander, 2.8% from some other race, and 4.3% from two or more races. Hispanic or Latino residents of any race comprised 5.9% of the population.

There were 6,359 households in the county, of which 28.6% had children under the age of 18 living with them and 32.6% had a female householder with no spouse or partner present. About 28.2% of all households were made up of individuals and 13.9% had someone living alone who was 65 years of age or older.

There were 7,280 housing units, of which 12.7% were vacant. Among occupied housing units, 69.4% were owner-occupied and 30.6% were renter-occupied. The homeowner vacancy rate was 1.2% and the rental vacancy rate was 7.7%.

Racially and ethnically, as a result of the demand for slave labor to work the cotton plantations, the county was majority black from before the American Civil War well into the 20th century. Starting in the early 1900s, hundreds of blacks left the county in the Great Migration to northern and midwestern industrial cities to gain better opportunities and escape the oppressive Jim Crow conditions, including the highest rate of lynchings of blacks in Georgia from 1880 to 1930.

== Education ==
The Brooks County School District, the school district for the entire county, offers pre-school to grade twelve. There are two elementary schools, a middle school and a high school, Brooks County High School. The district has 167 full-time teachers and over 2,563 students.

- North Brooks Elementary School
- Quitman Elementary School
- Brooks County Middle School
- Brooks County High School

The county is serviced by the Brooks County Public Library.

== Government ==
The Government consists of a five-member Board of Commissioners. Under the guidelines of the Commissioners is a County Administrator, a Sheriff and Tax Commissioner, the Judicial System and other Boards and Authorities.

== Politics ==
United States presidential election results for Brooks County, Georgia
Year	Republican		Democratic		Third party(ies)	
Year	No.	%	No.	%	No.	%
1912	42	5.43%	695	89.79%	37	4.78%
1916	25	2.28%	969	88.33%	103	9.39%
1920	76	11.29%	597	88.71%	0	0.00%
1924	128	9.69%	1,179	89.25%	14	1.06%
1928	192	19.96%	770	80.04%	0	0.00%
1932	75	4.98%	1,426	94.69%	5	0.33%
1936	94	6.83%	1,277	92.74%	6	0.44%
1940	248	16.01%	1,300	83.93%	1	0.06%
1944	279	16.81%	1,381	83.19%	0	0.00%
1948	188	11.21%	975	58.14%	514	30.65%
1952	800	30.01%	1,866	69.99%	0	0.00%
1956	534	21.62%	1,936	78.38%	0	0.00%
1960	765	33.77%	1,500	66.23%	0	0.00%
1964	2,342	69.50%	1,027	30.47%	1	0.03%
1968	589	15.58%	787	20.82%	2,404	63.60%
1972	2,430	79.08%	643	20.92%	0	0.00%
1976	1,102	29.35%	2,653	70.65%	0	0.00%
1980	1,546	40.40%	2,230	58.27%	51	1.33%
1984	2,229	57.30%	1,661	42.70%	0	0.00%
1988	2,136	58.54%	1,500	41.11%	13	0.36%
1992	1,779	41.23%	1,895	43.92%	641	14.86%
1996	1,738	42.87%	1,977	48.77%	339	8.36%
2000	2,406	52.87%	2,096	46.06%	49	1.08%
2004	2,912	56.91%	2,193	42.86%	12	0.23%
2008	3,507	56.52%	2,669	43.01%	29	0.47%
2012	3,554	52.62%	3,138	46.46%	62	0.92%
2016	3,701	58.41%	2,528	39.90%	107	1.69%
2020	4,261	60.01%	2,791	39.30%	49	0.69%
2024	4,560	63.25%	2,629	36.46%	21	0.29%

United States Senate election results for Brooks County, Georgia2
Year	Republican		Democratic		Third party(ies)	
Year	No.	%	No.	%	No.	%
2020	4,250	60.92%	2,607	37.37%	119	1.71%
2020	3,760	60.49%	2,456	39.51%	0	0.00%

United States Senate election results for Brooks County, Georgia3
Year	Republican		Democratic		Third party(ies)	
Year	No.	%	No.	%	No.	%
2020	1,953	28.57%	1,024	14.98%	3,858	56.44%
2020	3,761	60.51%	2,455	39.49%	0	0.00%
2022	3,528	62.96%	1,999	35.67%	77	1.37%
2022	3,209	63.51%	1,844	36.49%	0	0.00%

Georgia Gubernatorial election results for Brooks County
Year	Republican		Democratic		Third party(ies)	
Year	No.	%	No.	%	No.	%
2022	3,644	64.59%	1,959	34.72%	39	0.69%

As of the 2020s, Brooks County is a Republican stronghold, voting 63% for Donald Trump in 2024. For elections to the United States House of Representatives, Brooks County is part of Georgia's 8th congressional district, currently represented by Austin Scott. For elections to the Georgia State Senate, Brooks County is part of District 11. For elections to the Georgia House of Representatives, Brooks County is part of District 175.

== Recreation ==
Brooks County is well known for its wildlife. Quail, dove, ducks, and deer abound in the fields and forests. Brooks County also offers excellent fishing in its many lakes and streams, which are open to the public.

== Hospital ==
Brooks County Hospital, a part of Archbold Medical Center, a 25-bed facility was established in 1935 and has 24-hour emergency facilities.

== Transportation ==
=== Major highways ===
- U.S. Route 84 / State Route 38
- U.S. Route 221
- State Route 33
- State Route 76
- State Route 122
- State Route 133
- State Route 333

=== Railroads ===
- CSX

=== GA Bike Route 10 ===
Georgia State Bicycle Route 10 is one of 14 bike routes across Georgia. Route 10 is 246 miles (396 km) long and goes from Lake Seminole in the west to Jekyll Island in the east. It runs a west–east route, of approximately 27.3 miles (43.9 km), through the county and passes through downtown Quitman.

=== Airport ===
BROOKS CO (4J5) Runway length 5000' Lights, CTAF 122.9 FSS Macon 122.4

== See also ==
- National Register of Historic Places listings in Brooks County, Georgia
- List of counties in Georgia
