= Brooks County School District =

School district in Georgia (U.S. state)

Address
- 1081 Barwick Road Quitman, Georgia, 31643; United States
- Coordinates: 30.821704°N 83.597742°W

District information
- Grades: Pre-school - 12
- Superintendent: Dr. Vickie Reed

Students and staff
- Enrollment: 2,563
- Faculty: 157

Other information
- Accreditation: Southern Association of Colleges and Schools; Georgia Accrediting Commission
- Fax: (229) 263-5206
- Website: www.brooks.k12.ga.us

The Brooks County School District is a public school district in Brooks County, Georgia, United States, based in Quitman.

All of the county is in the school district. It serves the communities of Barwick, Grooverville, Morven, Pavo and Quitman.

== Schools ==
The Brooks County School District has two elementary schools, one middle school, and one high school.

Elementary schools

- North Brooks Elementary School
- Quitman Elementary School

Secondary schools

- Brooks County Middle School
- Brooks County High School
