= General Coffee State Park =

State park in Nicholls, Georgia, USA

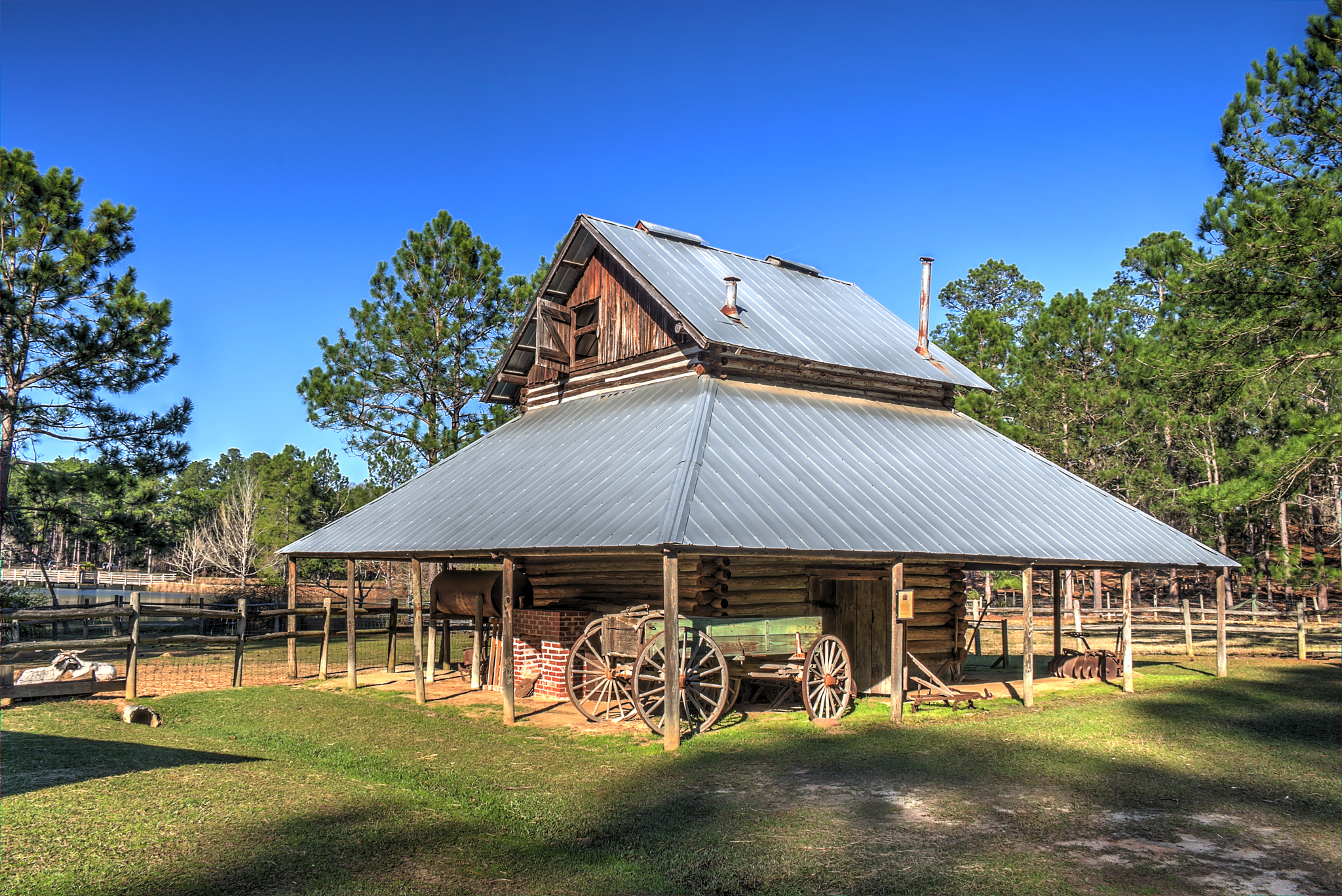
- Kirkland Tobacco Barn in General Coffee State Park

- Location within Georgia
- Location: Coffee County
- Nearest city: Douglas, Georgia
- Coordinates: 31°31′26.4″N 82°46′1.2″W
- Area: 1,511 acres (6.11 km^{2})

General Coffee State Park is a 1,511-acre (6.11 km^{2}) Georgia state park located near Douglas. The park is named after politician, farmer, and military leader General John E. Coffee. The park is host to many rare and endangered species, especially in the cypress swamps through which the Seventeen Mile River winds.

Attractions include a corn crib, tobacco barn, and cane mill. Visitors can stay overnight at the Burnham House, a renovated and elegantly redecorated 19th-century cabin.

== Facilities ==
- 50 Tent/Trailer/RV Campsites
- 1 Pioneer Campground
- 5 Cottages
- Burnham Cottage & Hawksnest House
- 1 Group Lodge
- 1 Group Shelter
- 7 Picnic Shelters
- Heritage Farm
- Outdoor Amphitheater

== Annual events ==
- Canoe Trip on the Satilla River (March)
- Lovebug Festival (September)
- Pioneer Skills Day (November)
- Christmas on the Farm (December)

== Gallery ==
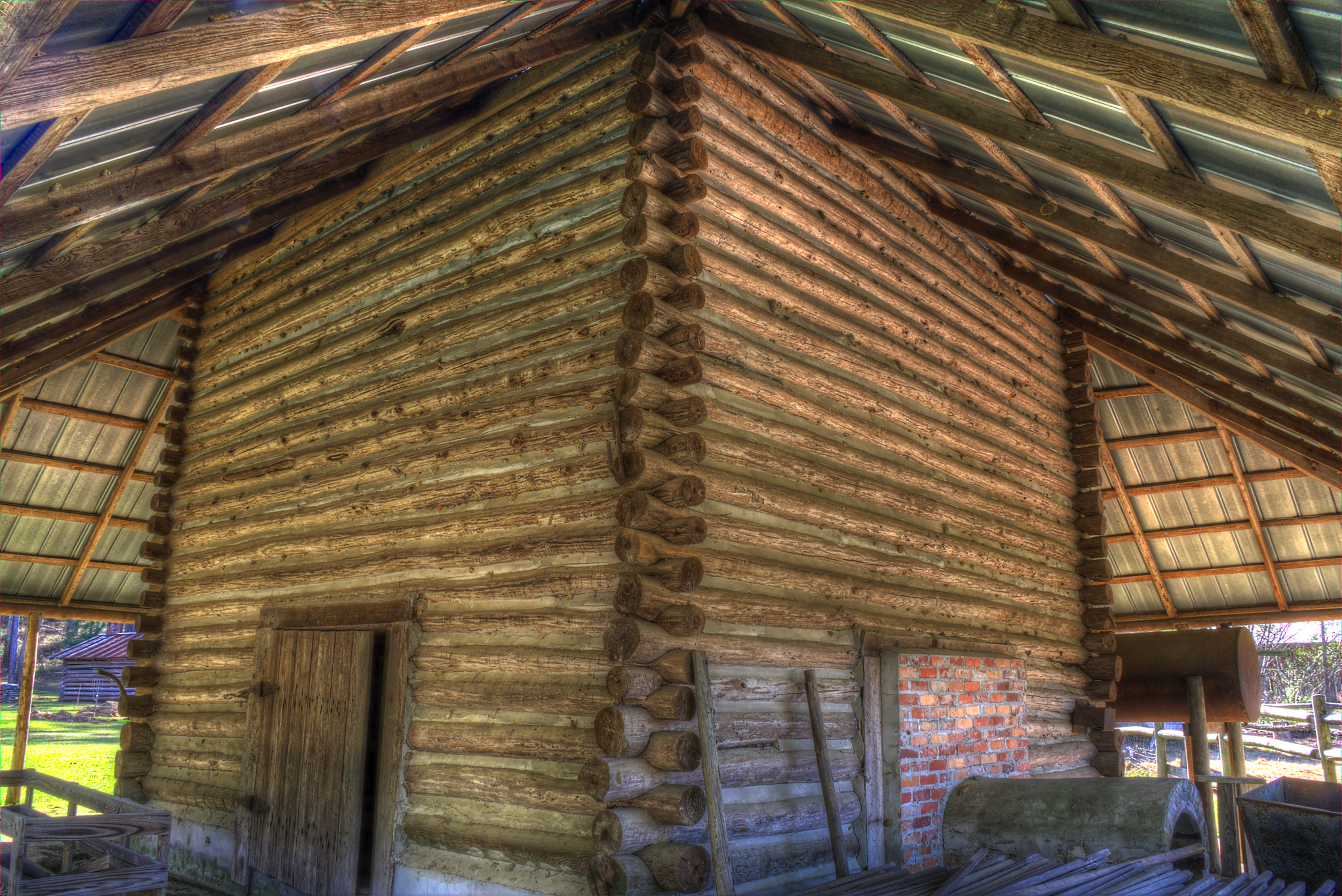
Detail of tobacco barn

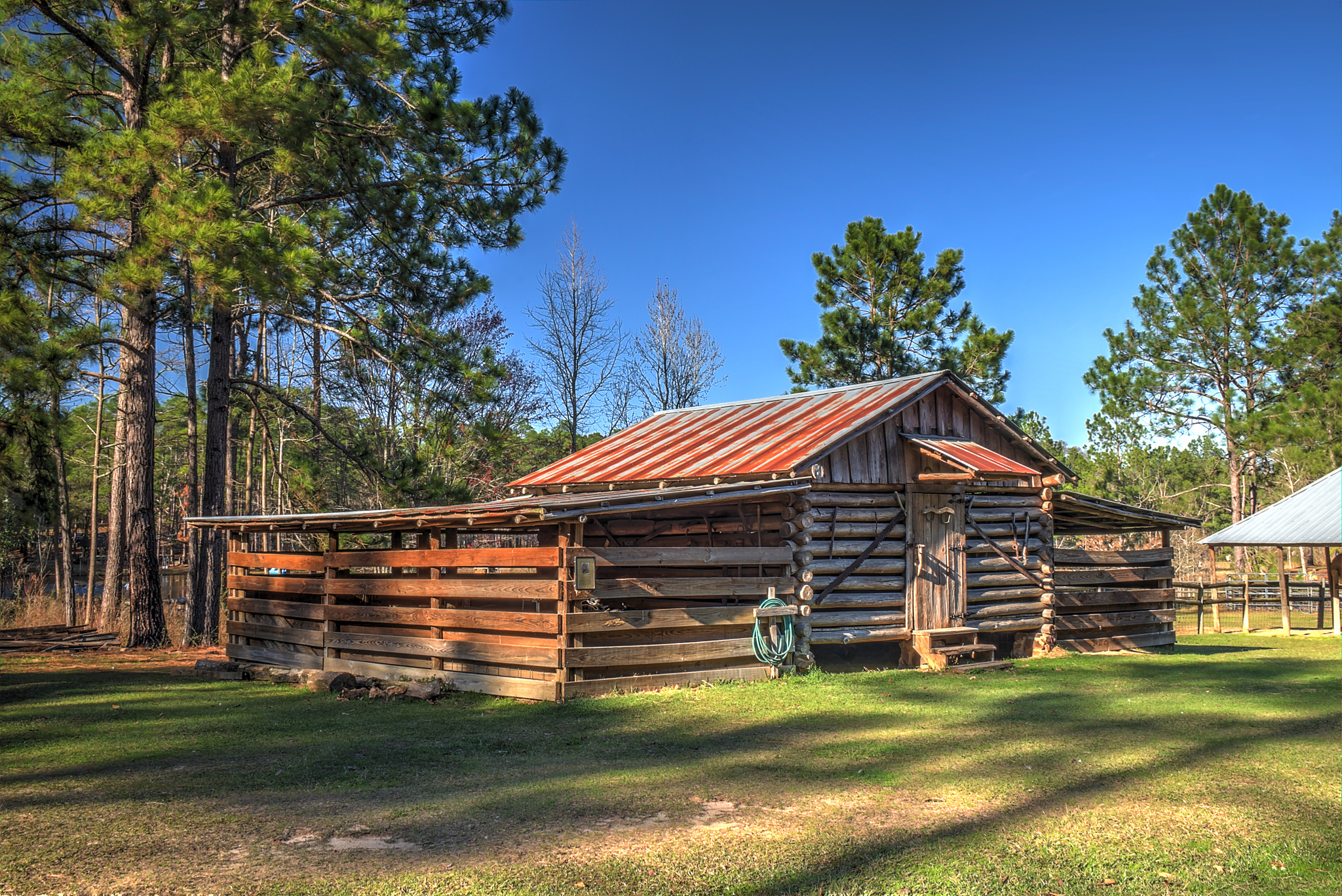
Mule and hay barn

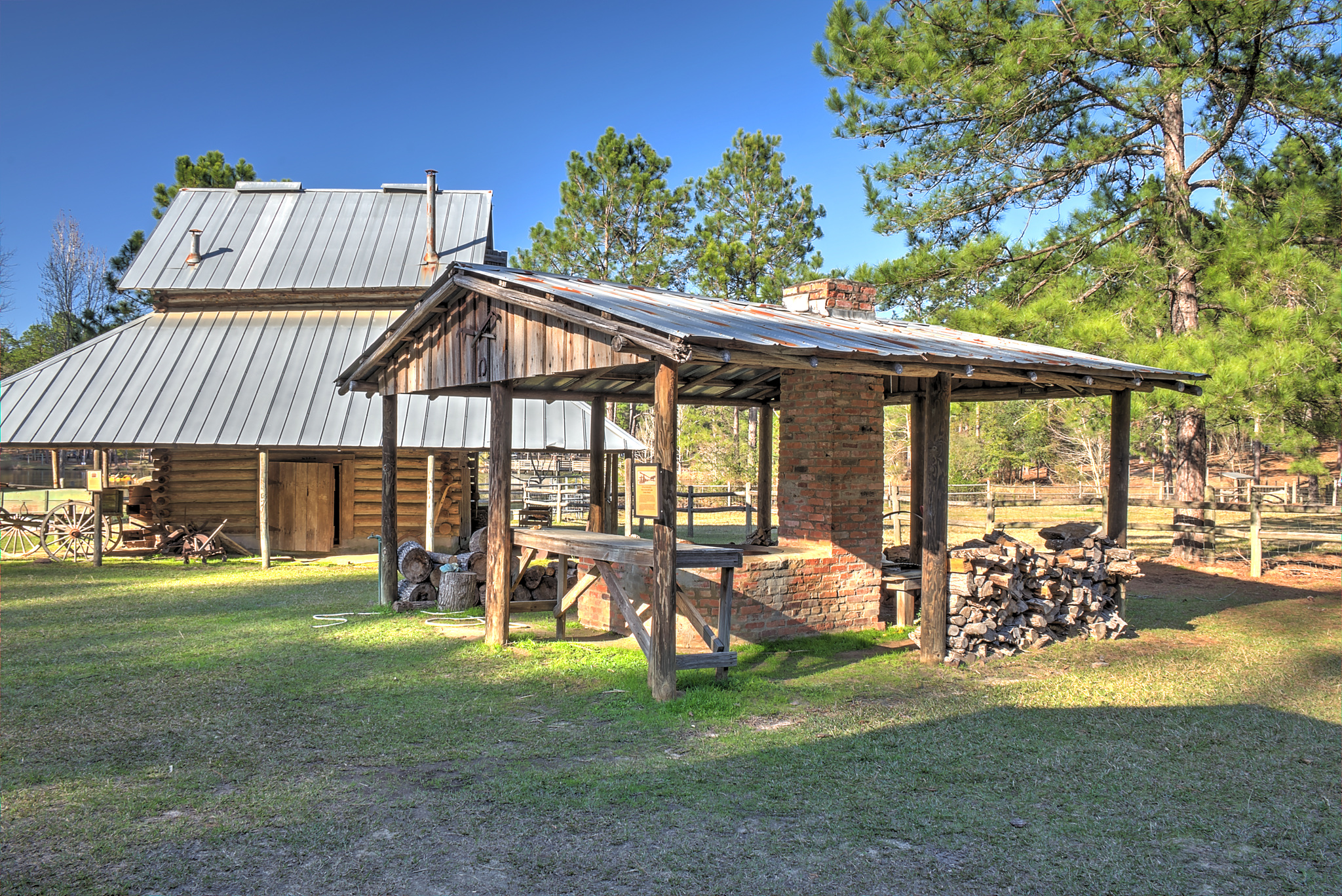
Syrup boiler and cane press

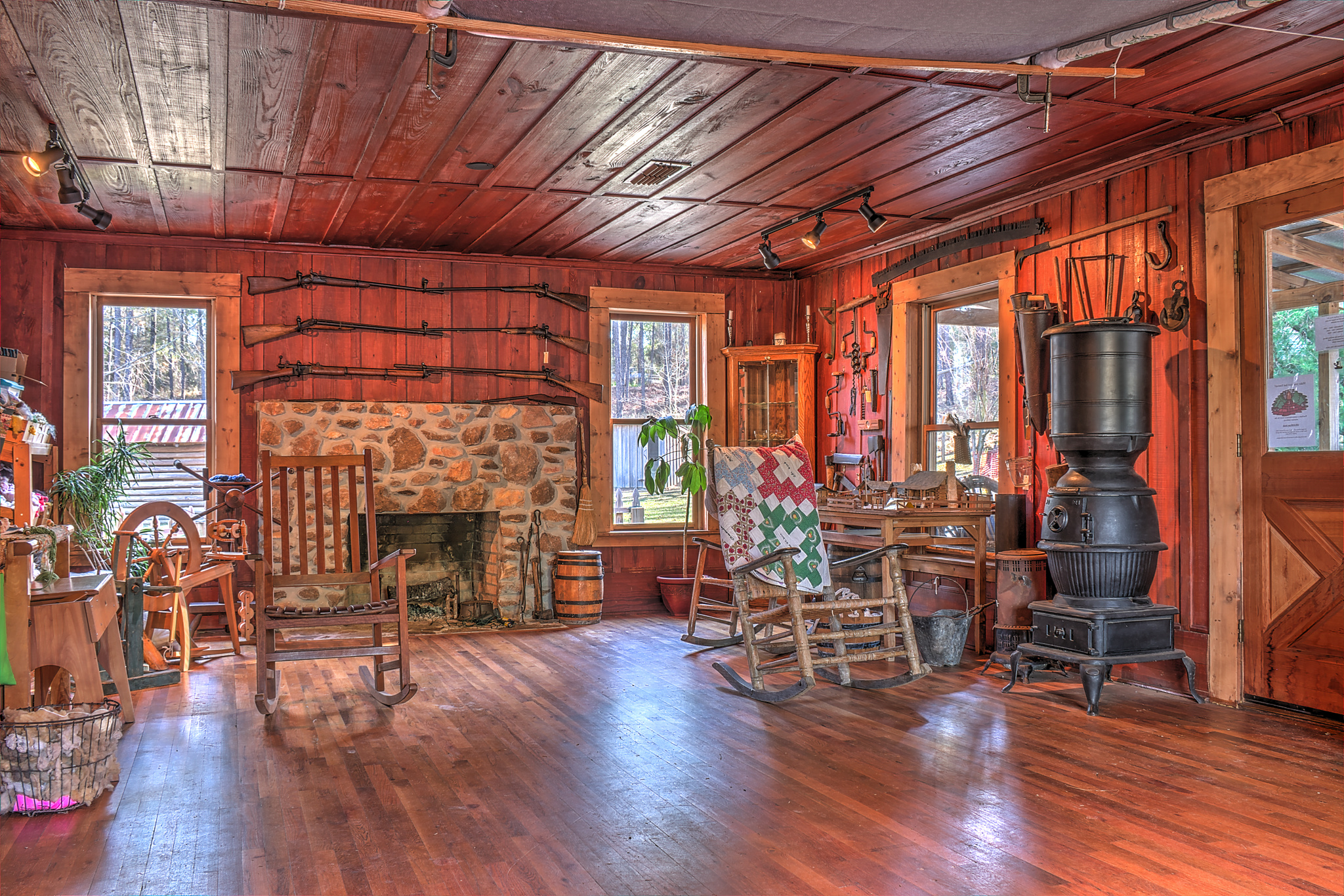
Reilhan cabin

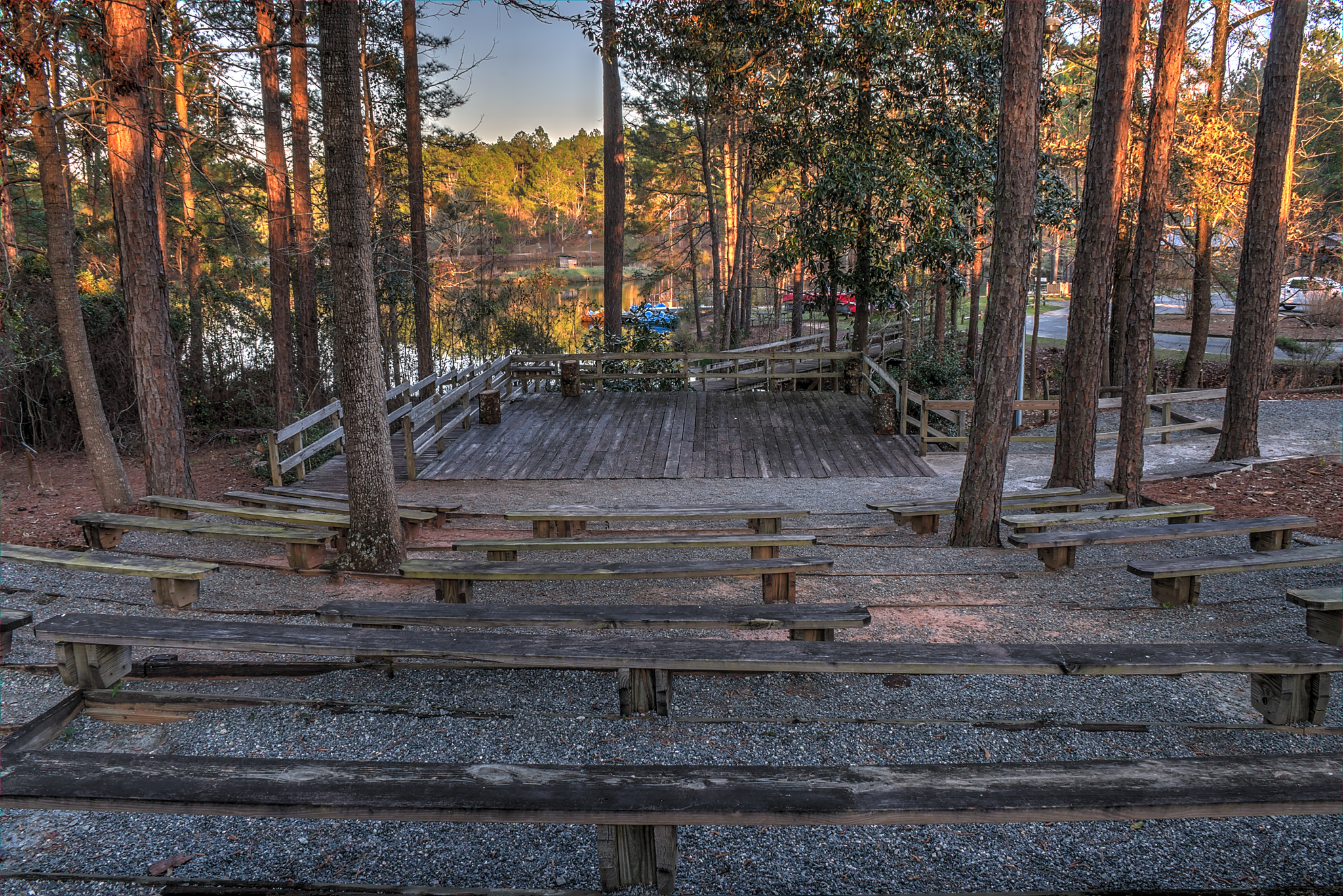
Outdoor amphitheater

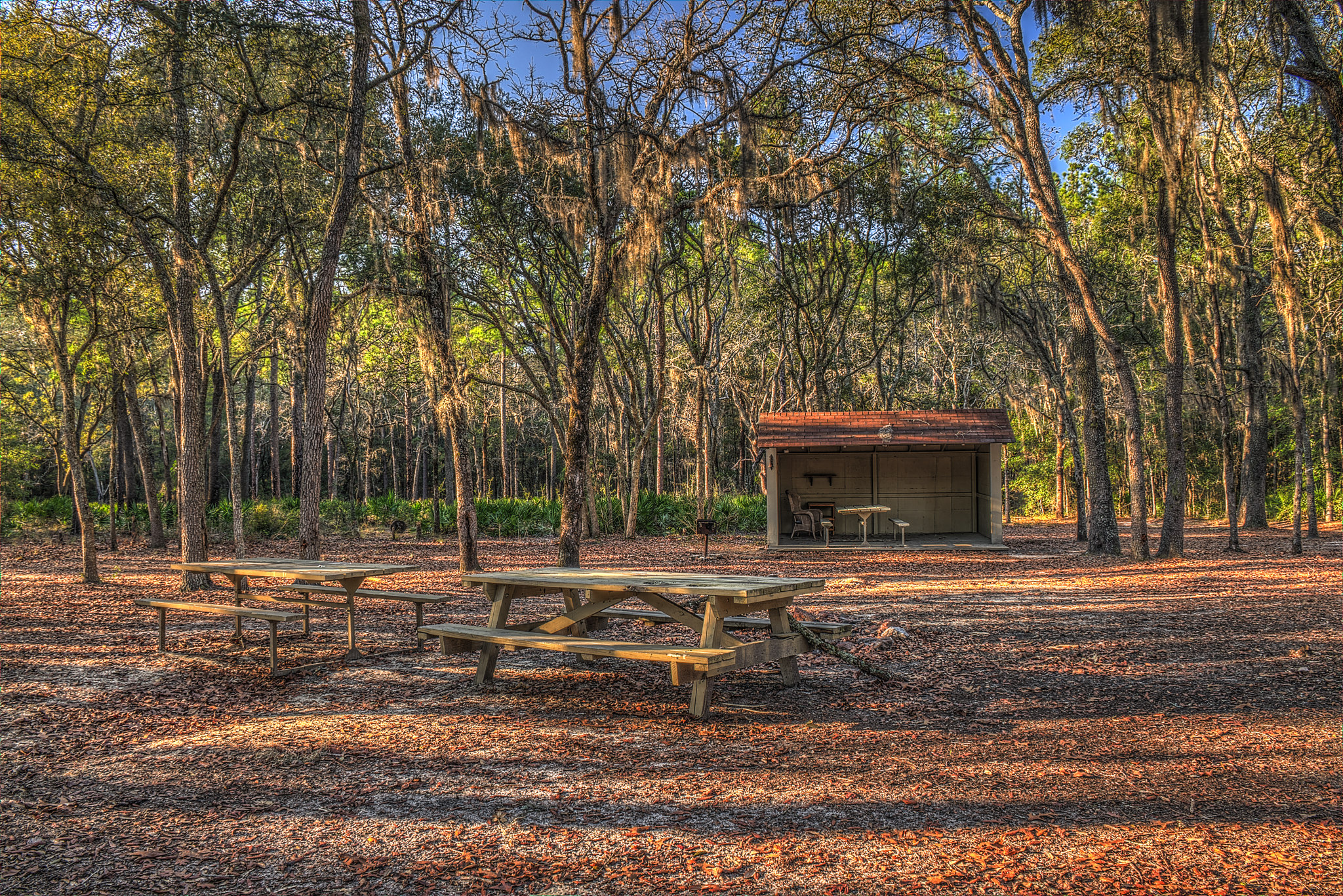
Pioneer campsite

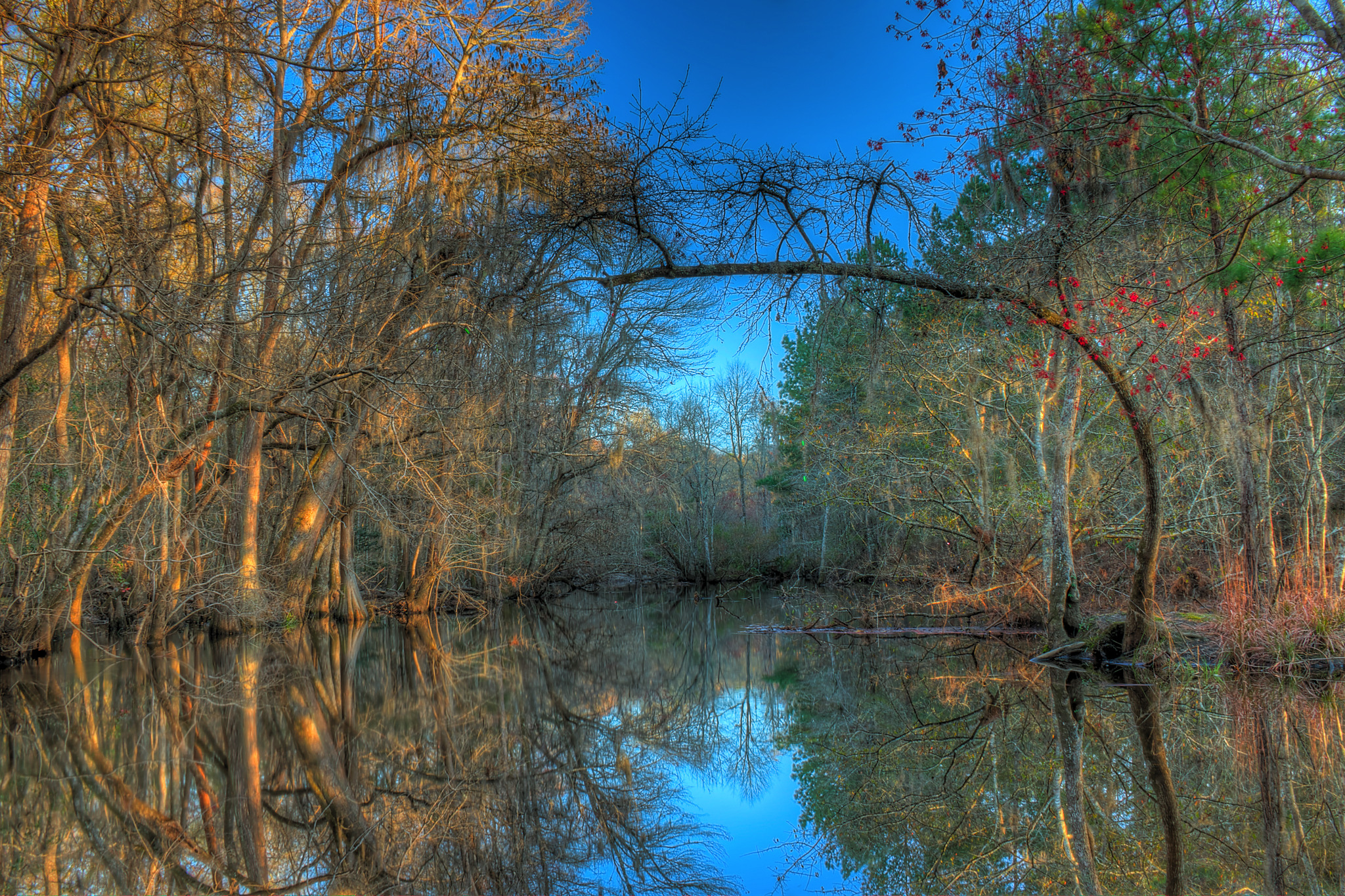
Seventeen Mile River

== See also ==
- Coffee Road
