= Thomas County School District =

School district in Georgia (U.S. state)

Address
- 200 N. Pinetree Blvd. Thomasville, Georgia, 31792; United States
- Coordinates: 30.856968°N 83.953259°W

District information
- Grades: Pre-school–12
- Superintendent: Dr. Lisa Williams
- NCES District ID: 1304890

Students and staff
- Enrollment: 5,466
- Faculty: 329

Other information
- Accreditation: Southern Association of Colleges and Schools; Georgia Accrediting Commission
- Fax: (229) 225-5012
- Website: www.thomas.k12.ga.us

The Thomas County School District is a public school district in Thomas County, Georgia, United States, based in an unincorporated area adjacent to Thomasville (and with a Thomasville postal address).

The district includes all parts of the community that are not in the city limits of Thomasville. It serves the communities of Boston, Coolidge, and Ochlocknee, as well as the Thomas County portions of Barwick, Meigs, and Pavo.

== Schools ==
The Thomas County School District has four elementary schools, one middle school, and two high schools.

Elementary schools

- Thomas County Upper Elementary School
- Cross Creek Elementary School
- Garrison-Pilcher Elementary School
- Hand-in-Hand Primary School

Secondary schools

- Thomas County Middle School
- Thomas County Central High School

Charter schools

- Bishop Hall Charter School
