= Brooks County race war =

The Brooks County "race war" was a series of lynchings of African-Americans committed in Brooks County, Georgia in the United States in December 1894. It was called a "race war" at the time.

Around Christmas 1894, a group of whites attacked and killed five blacks (some reports at the time said seven) while claiming to be searching for black murderers. Blacks in the county seat Quitman pled for aid from the Governor, while others went into hiding. No significant action was taken to stop the killing until the mob reached the plantation of Mitchell Brice. One of the richest planters in the area, Brice threatened to react harshly to any further violence and perhaps press formal legal charges. His main problem was with the mistreatment of his plantation workers.

On December 26, the governor ordered in the Valdosta Videttes (a volunteer military company), and claimed to find peace already restored.

== Contemporary accounts ==
The accounts in contemporary newspaper reports stated that on December 1, 1894, Jerry Jeffries, at 22-year old black man, killed "Tip" Mauldin, a county constable. Mauldin reportedly approached a group of black male laborers on their payday, drinking and gambling. He indicated he had a warrant for the arrest of one of the group, which led the drunken group to taunt him. Mauldin then thought better of continuing his errand, and turned to leave, but was shot by Jeffries in the back by a Winchester rifle. A group of blacks then performed a "war dance" at the site a day or two later. This caused outrage and a white "posse" of hundreds to form. At some point, Joseph Isom, one of the white men in the posse, was reportedly killed by Waverly Pike, a black man. On December 23, at least five blacks were killed by the posse, in the alleged pursuit of tracking down Pike. Press accounts did condemn the indiscriminate killings. However, there are no news reports of anyone being charged in connection with the lynchings.

Jeffries was not among those lynched, but was hanged in Quitman on April 5, 1895.
