= Thomas County Central High School =

Public high school in Thomasville, Georgia, United States

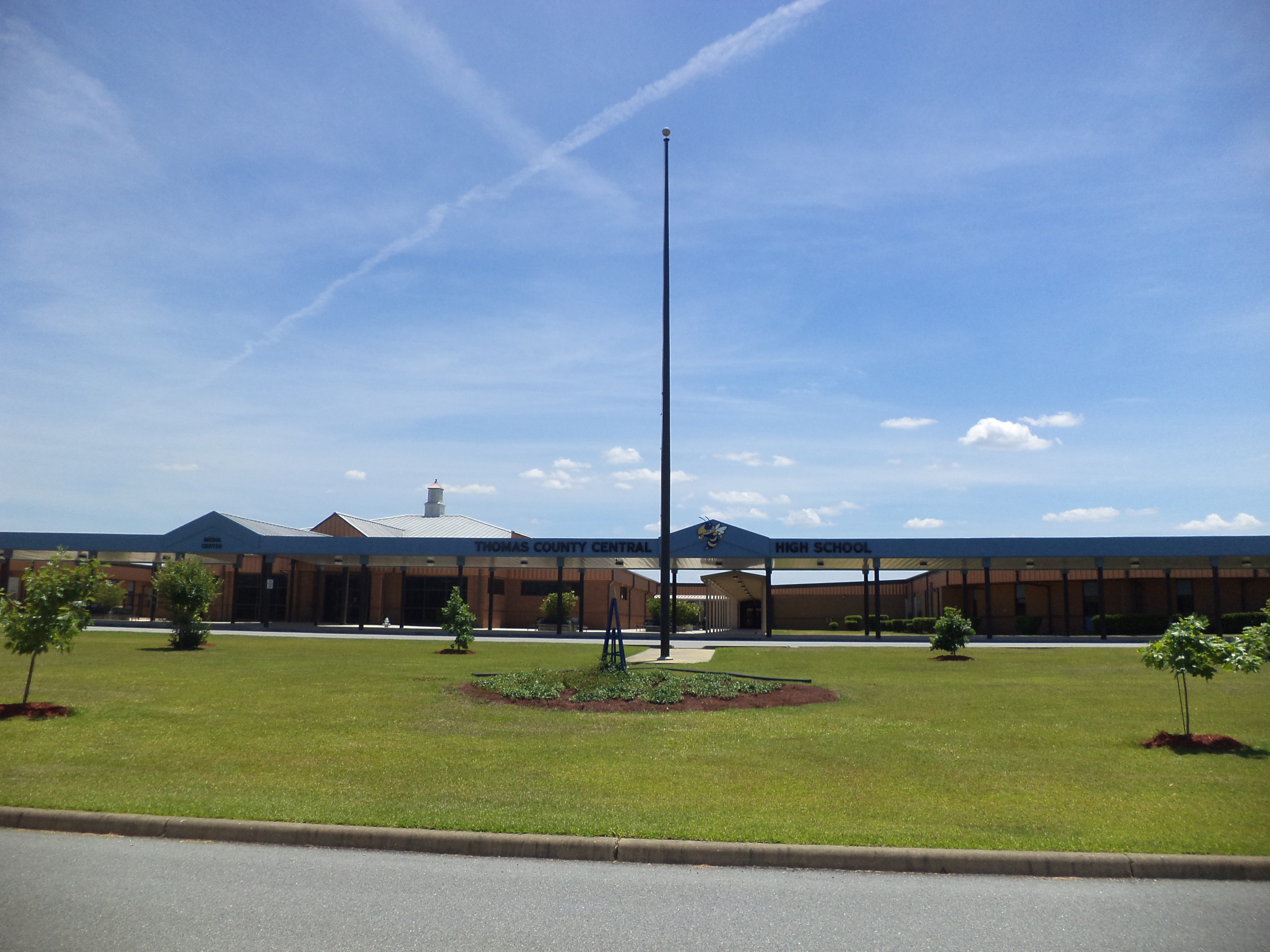

Location
- 4686 US Hwy 84 Bypass; Thomasville, Georgia 31792; United States; 30°52′25″N 83°57′59″W

Information
- Type: Public high school
- Established: 1958
- School district: Thomas County School District
- Superintendent: Lisa Williams
- Principal: James Thompson
- Teaching staff: 107.30 (on an FTE basis)
- Grades: 9–12
- Enrollment: 1,580 (2023–2024)
- Student to teacher ratio: 14.73
- Colors: Navy and Vegas gold
- Athletics conference: GHSA Region 2-AAAAAA
- Nickname: Yellow Jackets
- Rivals: Cairo High School; Thomasville High School
- Newspaper: The Swarm
- Yearbook: VESPA
- Website: tcchs.tcjackets.net

Thomas County Central High School is a high school in unincorporated Thomas County, Georgia, United States, with a Thomasville postal address.
