= John E. Coffee =

American politician

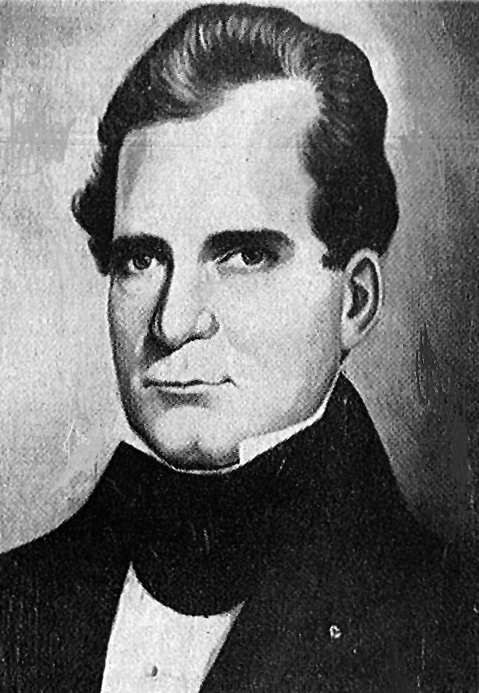

Member of the U.S. House of Representatives from Georgia's at-large district
- In office March 4, 1833 – September 25, 1836
- Preceded by: Daniel Newnan
- Succeeded by: William C. Dawson

Member of the Georgia Senate
- In office 1819–1827

Personal details
- Born: December 3, 1782 Prince Edward County, Virginia
- Died: September 25, 1836 (aged 53) Jacksonville, Georgia
- Party: Democratic
- Other political affiliations: Democratic-Republican; Jacksonian

Military service
- Branch/service: Georgia Militia
- Rank: General

John E. Coffee (December 3, 1782 – September 25, 1836) was a military leader and a congressman for the state of Georgia.

== Early life ==
John E. Coffee was born in Prince Edward County, Virginia in 1782. He was a grandson of Peter Coffee, Sr. (1716 – November 1771) and Susannah Mathews (1701–1796). He is sometimes confused by researchers with his first cousin John Coffee, who served as a general in the Tennessee militia.

John E. Coffee was 18 when he moved with his family to Hancock County, Georgia, in 1800. His parents developed a cotton plantation near Powelton, based on the labor of enslaved African Americans.

In 1807, the younger Coffee settled in Telfair County, Georgia, where he developed his own plantation.

== Military career ==
As a general in the Georgia state militia, Coffee supervised construction in the 1820s of a supply road through the state of Georgia. It was called "Coffee Road" and enabled the transportation to the new Florida Territory. It is now called the "Old Coffee Road".

== Political career ==
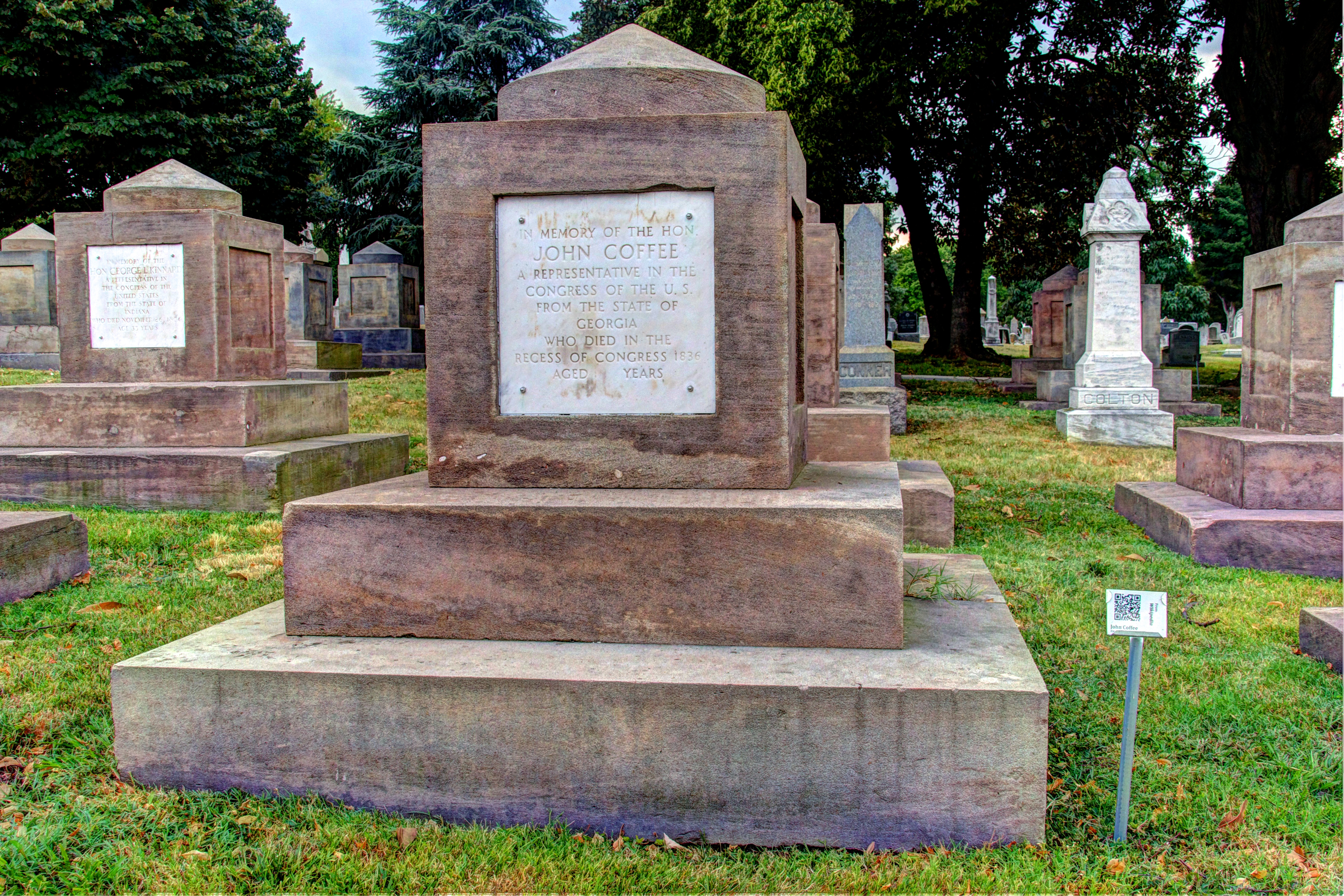
John Coffee's cenotaph at the Congressional Cemetery.

John Coffee served as a member of the Georgia Senate from 1819 to 1827. He was elected as a Jacksonian Democrat to the Twenty-third and Twenty-fourth U.S. Congresses and served from March 4, 1833, until his death on September 25, 1836. He was re-elected to the Twenty-fifth United States Congress on October 3, 1836, after his death, the news of his death not having been received.

Coffee died on his plantation near Jacksonville, Georgia, on September 25, 1836, and was buried there. In 1921, his remains were reinterred in McRae Cemetery, McRae, Georgia.

== Legacy and honors ==
In addition to Old Coffee Road, Coffee County, Georgia, and General Coffee State Park were named in honor of John E. Coffee.

== See also ==
- List of members of the United States Congress who died in office (1790–1899)

U.S. House of Representatives
Preceded by Daniel Newnan	Member of the U.S. House of Representatives from Georgia's at-large congressional district March 4, 1833 – September 25, 1836	Succeeded by William Crosby Dawson
