= Barney, Georgia =

- Unincorporated community
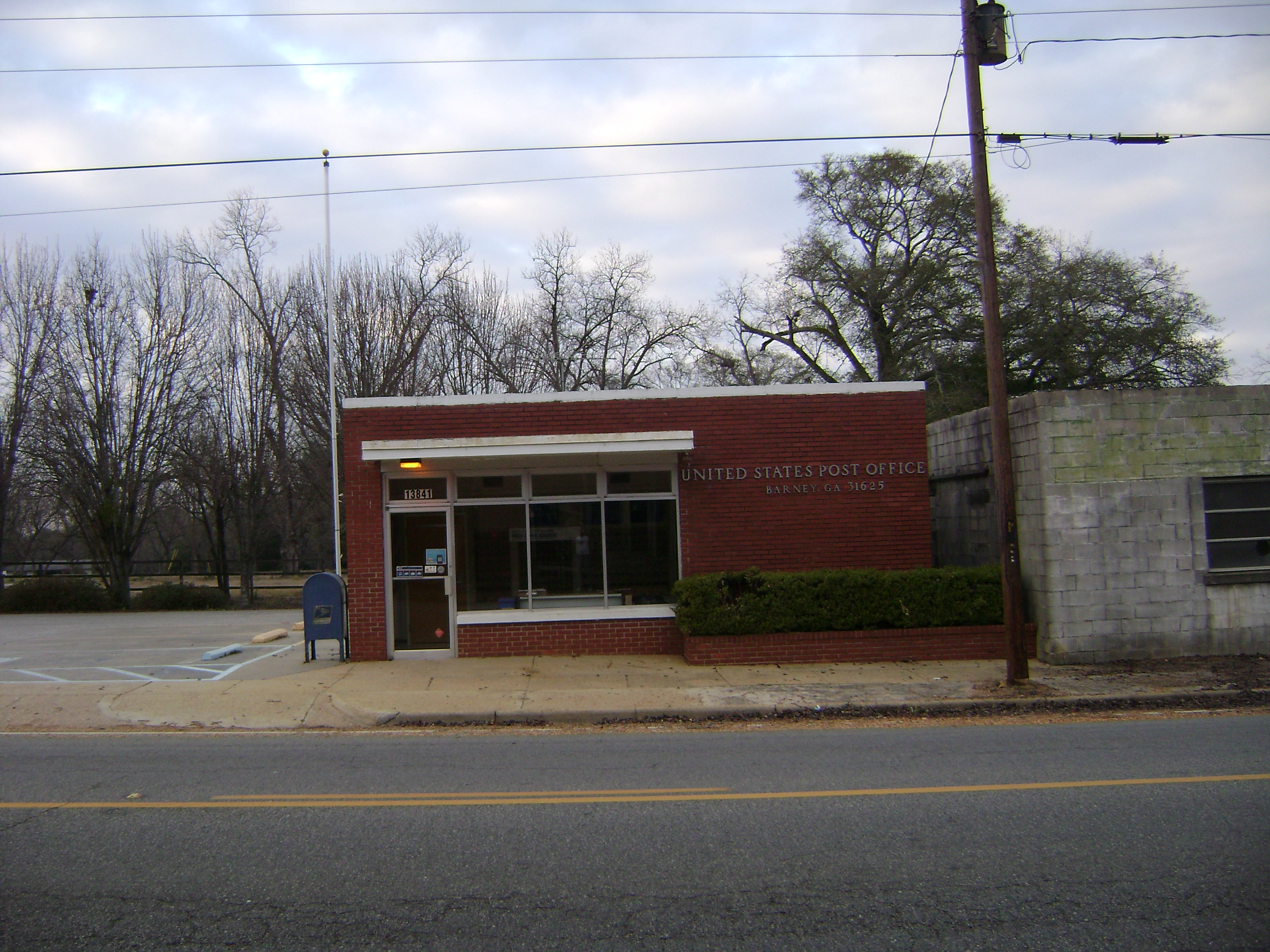
- Barney Post Office

- Location within Georgia
- Coordinates: 31°00′30″N 83°30′47″W
- Country: United States
- State: Georgia
- County: Brooks
- Elevation: 239 ft (73 m)
- Time zone: UTC-5 (Eastern (EST))
  - Summer (DST): UTC-4 (EDT)
- ZIP code: 31625
- Area code: 229
- GNIS feature ID: 310812

Barney is an unincorporated community in Brooks County, Georgia, in the United States. The community is located at the junction of state routes 76 and 122, 4.6 miles (7.4 km) north of Morven. Barney has a post office with ZIP code 31625.

== History ==
Barney was named after the Barney & Smith Car Company in 1897, at the time the railroad first was extended through the area. A post office called Barney has been in operation since 1897. The Georgia General Assembly incorporated Barney as a town in 1903. The town was officially dissolved in 1995 along with many other inactive Georgia municipalities.

== Transport ==
Barney's major highways are 122 that goes through Thomasville, Pattern, Pavo, Barney, Hahira, and Lakeland. The other one is highway 76 or Adel highway that goes through Greenville, Florida, Quitman, Morven, Barney, Adel, and Nashville.
