= Pidcock, Georgia =

- Unincorporated community
- Location within the state of Georgia Pidcock, Georgia (the United States)
- Coordinates: 30°47′04″N 83°42′28″W
- Country: United States
- State: Georgia
- County: Brooks
- Elevation: 141 ft (43 m)
- Time zone: UTC-5 (Eastern (EST))
  - Summer (DST): UTC-4 (EDT)
- Area code: 229
- GNIS ID: 332658

Pidcock is an unincorporated community in Brooks County, Georgia, United States.
