= Dixie, Brooks County, Georgia =

Dixie, Georgia
- Unincorporated community Census-designated place
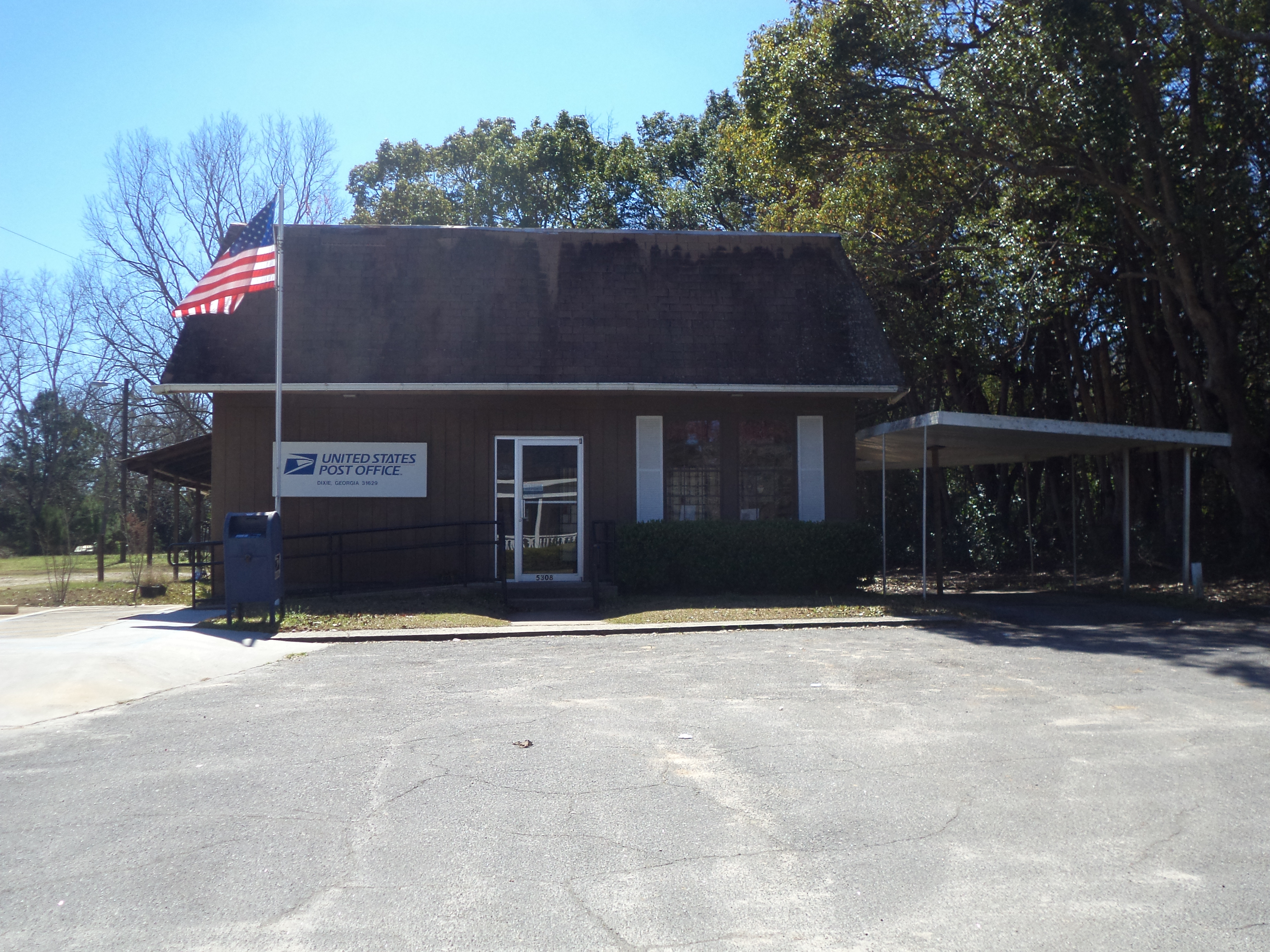
- Dixie Post Office

- Location within Georgia
- Coordinates: 30°47′09″N 83°39′52″W
- Country: United States
- State: Georgia
- County: Brooks
- Elevation: 167 ft (51 m)

Population (2020)
  - Total: 121
- Time zone: UTC-5 (Eastern (EST))
  - Summer (DST): UTC-4 (EDT)
- ZIP code: 31629
- Area code: 229
- GNIS feature ID: 355505

Dixie is an unincorporated community and census-designated place (CDP) in Brooks County, Georgia, United States. Dixie is located near U.S. Route 84, 6.2 miles (10.0 km) west of Quitman. Dixie has a post office with ZIP code 31629.

The 2020 census listed a population of 121.

== History ==
Dixie had its start in 1861 when the railroad was extended to that point. The community was named from Dixie, a nickname for the southeastern United States. A post office called Dixie has been in operation since 1879. The Georgia General Assembly incorporated the place in 1908 as the "Town of Dixie". The town's municipal charter was dissolved in 1995.

== Demographics ==
Historical population
Census	Pop.	Note	%±
2020	121		—
U.S. Decennial Census; 2020

Dixie was first listed as a census designated place in the 2020 census.

Dixie CDP, Georgia – Racial and ethnic composition Note: the US Census treats Hispanic/Latino as an ethnic category. This table excludes Latinos from the racial categories and assigns them to a separate category. Hispanics/Latinos may be of any race.
Race / Ethnicity (NH = Non-Hispanic)	Pop 2020	% 2020
White alone (NH)	104	85.95%
Black or African American alone (NH)	9	7.44%
Native American or Alaska Native alone (NH)	0	0.00%
Asian alone (NH)	0	0.00%
Pacific Islander alone (NH)	0	0.00%
Some Other Race alone (NH)	1	0.83%
Mixed Race or Multi-Racial (NH)	4	3.31%
Hispanic or Latino (any race)	3	2.48%
Total	121	100.00%

At the 2020 census, the CDP had a population of 121.
