= Daniel Newnan =

American politician (1780–1851)

Member of the U.S. House of Representatives from Georgia's at-large district
- In office March 4, 1831 – March 3, 1833
- Preceded by: Charles Eaton Haynes
- Succeeded by: John E. Coffee

Georgia Secretary of State
- In office 1825–1827

Superintendent Georgia State Penitentiary
- In office 1823–1824

Personal details
- Born: 1780 Salisbury, North Carolina, U.S.
- Died: January 16, 1851 (aged 70–71) Rossville, Georgia, U.S.
- Resting place: Newnan Springs Cemetery, Catoosa County, Georgia, U.S.
- Party: Jacksonian Democrat

Daniel Newnan (1780 – January 16, 1851) was an American politician and military commander in Spanish Florida (fighting against Seminole people), North Carolina and Georgia.

== Early years and education ==
Born in Salisbury, North Carolina, in 1780, Newnan attended the University of North Carolina at Chapel Hill in 1796 and 1797.

== Military career ==
He was commissioned as an ensign and second lieutenant in the Fourth United States Infantry on March 3, 1799, promoted to first lieutenant the following November and resigned on January 1, 1801.

Newnan was adjutant general of Georgia from 1806 to 1817. In June 1812 Newnan (with the rank of Colonel) led two dragoons and 250 infantry of the Georgia militia to join the Patriot War in Florida. The Patriot Army was a group of American adventurers, primarily from Georgia, that was attempting to seize Spanish Florida. Newnan led an expedition into the interior of Florida in September to find and punish Seminoles who had attacked the Americans in Florida. His force consisted of 117 men, only 78 of whom were from the Georgia militia (the others had refused to extend their short-term enlistments). Newnan's company unexpectedly encountered a band of Alachua Seminoles led by King Payne. The ensuing battle quickly became a stalemate, and Newnan's force was pinned down for nine days before withdrawing. During the Creek War, Newnan commanded a group of Georgia Volunteers; he fought the British at the Battle of Fort Peter.

== Post war years ==
After the war, he lived on a plantation near McDonough, Georgia. He was commissioned a major general over the third division of the Georgia Militia in 1817.

=== Public office ===
From 1823 to 1824, Newnan was the superintendent of the Georgia State Penitentiary and from 1825 to 1827, he served as the Secretary of State of Georgia. Newnan was elected as a Jacksonian Democrat and Representative of Georgia to the 22nd United States Congress and served one term from March 4, 1831, until March 3, 1833. He was not reelected.

From 1837 to 1840, Newnan again served as adjutant general of Georgia.

== Death and legacy ==
He died near Rossville, Georgia, on January 16, 1851, and was buried at Newnan Springs Cemetery in Catoosa County, Georgia.

The city of Newnan, Georgia was named in his honor in 1828. Newnan's Lake and the former town of Newnansville, both in Alachua County, Florida, are named after Colonel Newnan.

== Notes ==
U.S. House of Representatives
Preceded by Charles Eaton Haynes	Member of the U.S. House of Representatives from Georgia's at-large congressional district March 4, 1831 – March 3, 1833	Succeeded by John E. Coffee
