= Barwick, Georgia =

- City
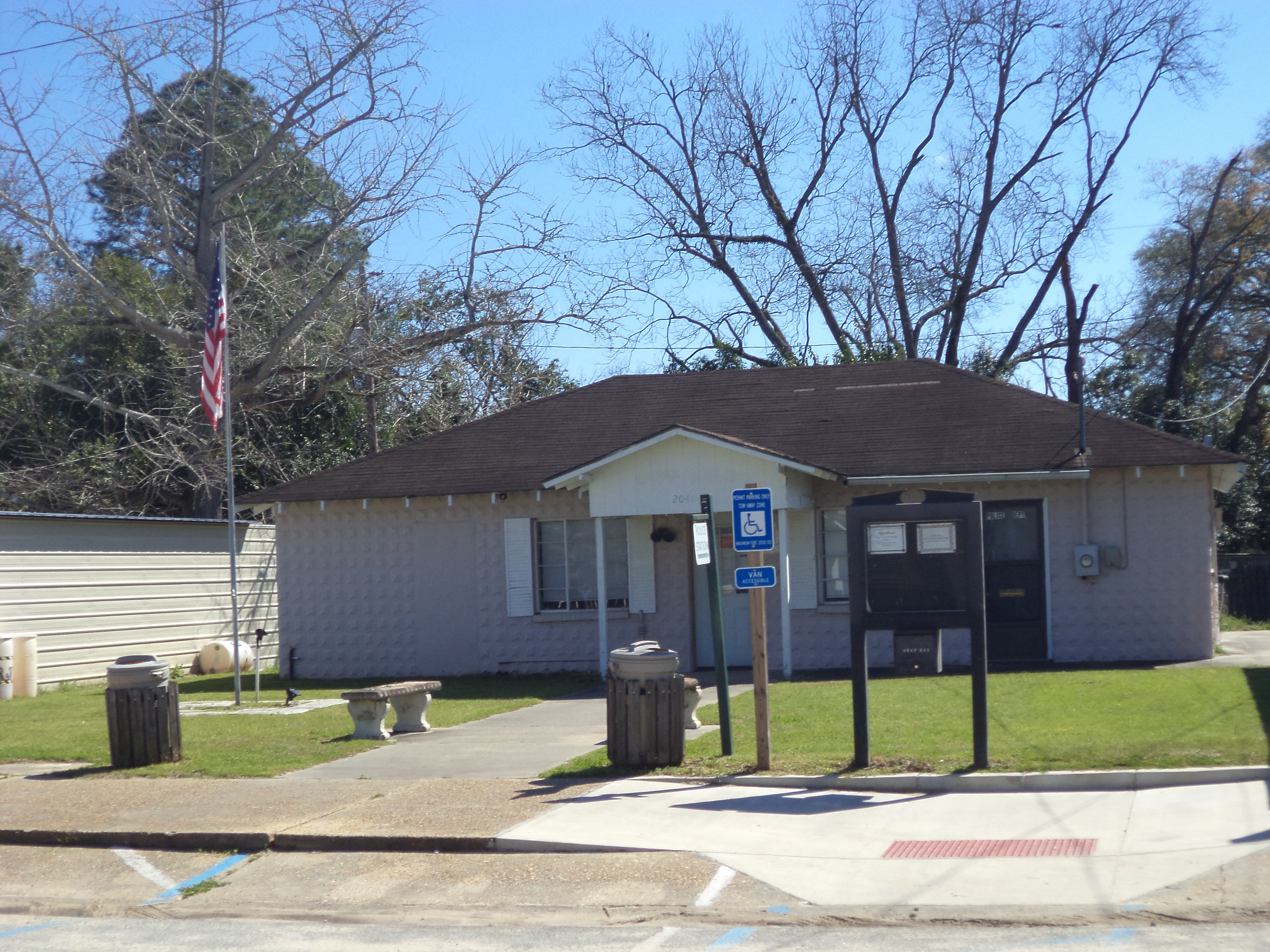
- Barwick City Hall

- Seal

- Location in Thomas County and the state of Georgia
- Coordinates: 30°54′N 83°44′W
- Country: United States
- State: Georgia
- Counties: Thomas, Brooks

Area
  - Total: 0.75 sq mi (1.94 km^{2})
  - Land: 0.72 sq mi (1.86 km^{2})
  - Water: 0.031 sq mi (0.08 km^{2})
- Elevation: 266 ft (81 m)

Population (2020)
  - Total: 363
  - Density: 505.5/sq mi (195.19/km^{2})
- Time zone: UTC-5 (Eastern (EST))
  - Summer (DST): UTC-4 (EDT)
- ZIP code: 31720
- Area code: 229
- FIPS code: 13-05708
- GNIS feature ID: 0310835
- Website: www.cityofbarwick.org

Barwick is a city divided by the county line between Brooks and Thomas counties, Georgia, United States. It is part of the Valdosta metropolitan statistical area. As of the 2020 census, the city had a population of 363.

== History ==
Barwick had its start in the early 1890s when the railroad was extended to that point. A post office has been in operation at Barwick since 1894. The community was named after R. H. Barwick, a Primitive Baptist leader. Barwick was incorporated by the Georgia General Assembly as a town in 1903.

== Geography ==
Barwick is located at 30°54′N 83°44′W (30.8921, −83.7384). According to the United States Census Bureau, the city has a total area of 0.73 square miles (1.9 km^{2}), of which 0.031 square miles (0.08 km^{2}), or 4.16%, is water.

== Demographics ==
Historical population
Census	Pop.	Note	%±
1910	381		—
1920	422		10.8%
1930	499		18.2%
1940	409		−18.0%
1950	436		6.6%
1960	400		−8.3%
1970	432		8.0%
1980	413		−4.4%
1990	385		−6.8%
2000	444		15.3%
2010	386		−13.1%
2020	363		−6.0%
U.S. Decennial Census; 1850-1870 1870-1880; 1890-1910 1920-1930; 1940 1950 1960; 1970 1980 1990; 2000 2010

At the census of 2000, there were 444 people, 181 households, and 110 families residing in the town. By 2020, its population declined to 363.

Circa 2024, its population was 368. The population by county breakdown was as follows: 240 in Thomas County and 146 in Brooks County.

== Education ==
Residents in Brooks County are in the Brooks County School District.

Residents in Thomas County are in the Thomas County School District.
