= Nankin, Georgia =

Unincorporated community in Georgia, U.S.

Coordinates: 30°39′58″N 83°28′05″W

Nankin is an unincorporated community in Brooks County, in the U.S. state of Georgia.

== History ==
A post office called Nankin was established in 1856, and remained in operation until 1907. The community was named after Nankin, in China.
