= Pavo, Georgia =

- City
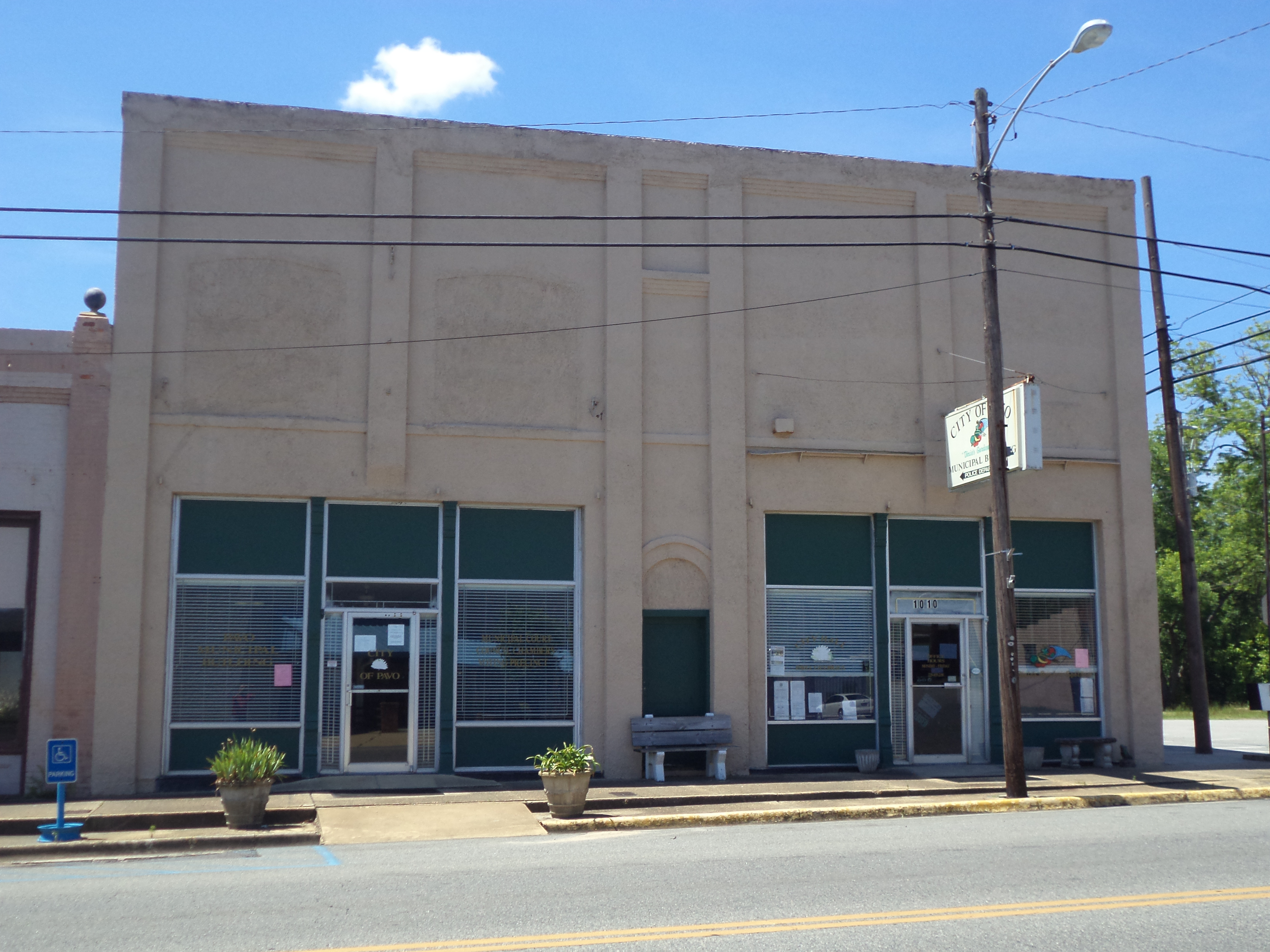
- Pavo City Hall Municipal Building

- Logo

- Location in Brooks County, Thomas County and the state of Georgia
- Coordinates: 30°57′37″N 83°44′22″W
- Country: United States
- State: Georgia
- Counties: Thomas, Brooks

Area
  - Total: 1.76 sq mi (4.57 km^{2})
  - Land: 1.76 sq mi (4.56 km^{2})
  - Water: 0.0039 sq mi (0.01 km^{2})
- Elevation: 256 ft (78 m)

Population (2020)
  - Total: 622
  - Density: 353.5/sq mi (136.47/km^{2})
- Time zone: UTC-5 (Eastern (EST))
  - Summer (DST): UTC-4 (EDT)
- ZIP code: 31778
- Area code: 229
- FIPS code: 13-59556
- GNIS feature ID: 0356459
- Website: cityofpavo.com

Pavo is a city that is divided by the county line between Brooks and Thomas counties in the U.S. state of Georgia. It is part of the Valdosta, Georgia Metropolitan Statistical Area. The population was 622 in 2020.

The city is home to a branch of the Thomas County Public Library System.

Pavo was featured in country music star Alan Jackson's video for his hit song "Little Man", lamenting the decline of small-town America.

== History ==
The community was originally known as McDonald, named after one of two prominent families in the area. However, concerns were raised about misdirected mail, resulting from confusion between McDonald, in the southern part of the state, and McDonough located in the north. The community was then renamed after an early postmaster, Duncan D. Peacock,"Pavo" being the Latin word meaning "peacock". The city became a small Georgia agricultural hub in the early 1820s, and quickly helped strengthen the thriving industry of watermelons in the early 20th century. According to an article in the town’s newspaper the Pavo Ledger, the town established a local high school, called Pavo High School in 1917. The school steadily became the center of the small community, and when the school closed in the mid 20th century to make way for the expansion of Thomas County High School, the Pavo Ledger would later state that “a piece of Pavo in their hearts was lost”. The agricultural tradition of watermelon production that Pavo residents have continued for many generations has proved important to the economy of the town. Pavo experienced strong surges in population throughout its 200 years of history, especially when the number of residents doubled.

== Geography ==
Pavo is located at 30°57′37″N 83°44′22″W (30.960341, -83.739352). Georgia State Route 122 (Harris Street) passes through the center of town, leading southwest 17 miles (27 km) to Thomasville and east 21 miles (34 km) to Interstate 75 at Hahira. Georgia State Route 33 leads north out of town as Robert Street towards Moultrie; southbound it leaves as County Line Road towards Barwick and Boston.

According to the United States Census Bureau, Pavo has a total area of 1.8 square miles (4.7 km^{2}), all land.

== Demographics ==
Historical population
Census	Pop.	Note	%±
1900	262		—
1910	572		118.3%
1920	990		73.1%
1930	750		−24.2%
1940	706		−5.9%
1950	806		14.2%
1960	817		1.4%
1970	775		−5.1%
1980	830		7.1%
1990	774		−6.7%
2000	711		−8.1%
2010	627		−11.8%
2020	622		−0.8%
U.S. Decennial Census; 1850-1870 1870-1880; 1890-1910 1920-1930; 1940 1950 1960; 1970 1980 1990; 2000 2010

In 2000, there were 711 people, 301 households, and 191 families residing in the city.

Circa 2024, its population was 627. The population by county breakdown was as follows: 379 in Thomas County and 248 in Brooks County.

== Arts and culture ==
The city celebrates "Peacock Day" on the second Saturday each May.

== Education ==
Residents in Brooks County are in the Brooks County School District.

Residents in Thomas County are in the Thomas County School District.
