= Coffee Road =

Coordinates: 30.533505°N 85.4183201°W

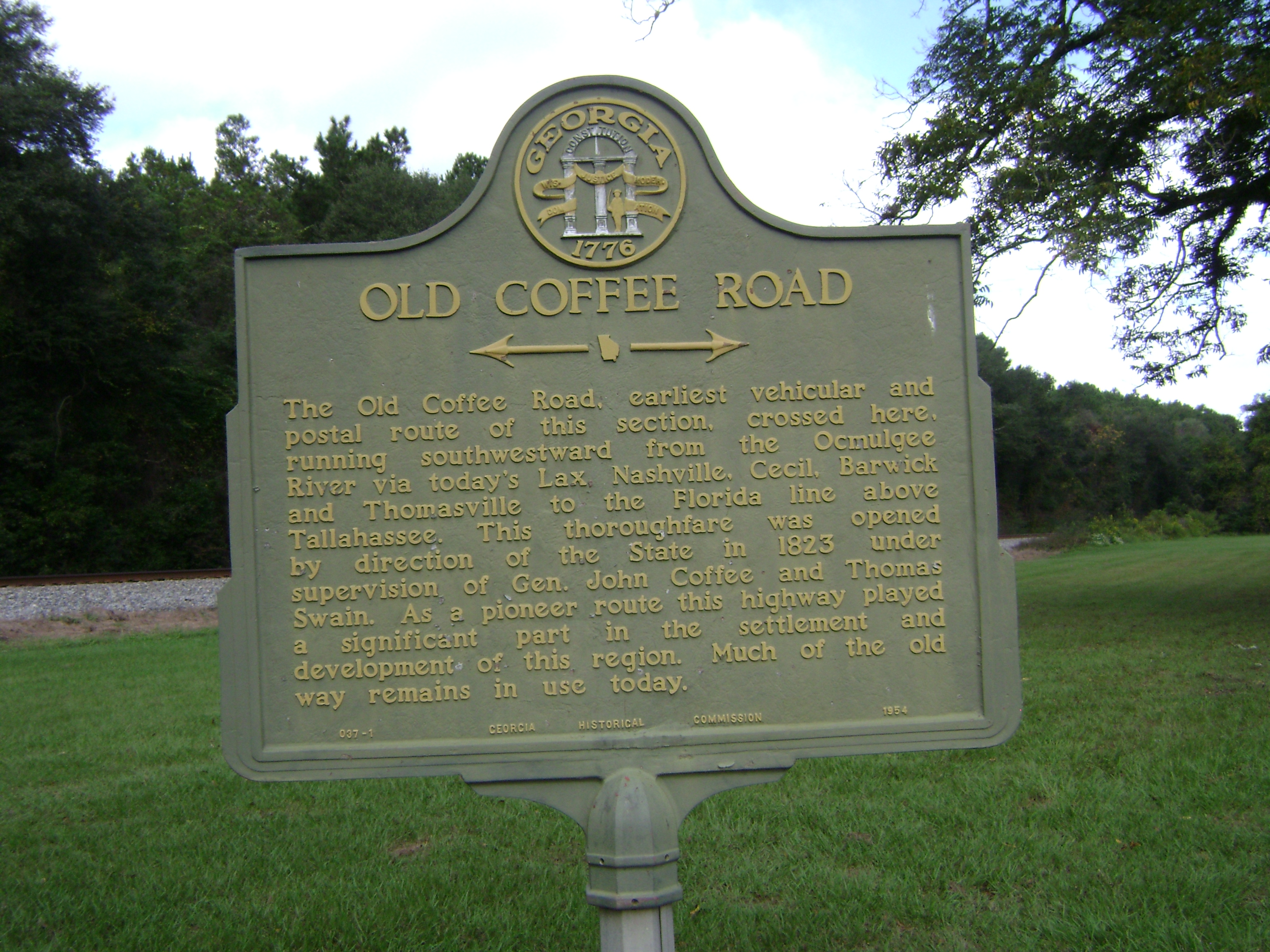
Old Coffee Road historical marker north of Cecil, Georgia

Coffee Road as it became known, was a supply trail cut through the southern Georgia frontier in the early 1820s by General John E. Coffee, with the help of Thomas Swain. After establishing the counties of Early, Irwin, and Appling in 1819, the Georgia General Assembly approved construction of the road December 23, 1822, with funds of $1,500. The trail was built in the early 1820s and ran from Jacksonville, Georgia, through Metcalf and across the Florida border. The trail was about 3 ft (0.91 m) wide, cleared, dug, and leveled by enslaved African-American laborers.

This became the first vehicular path through the region to the new U.S. Territory of Florida. It was later used by settlers moving into the Georgia frontier. It has no bridges or ditches and only private ferry crossings. Many pioneer families, including Hall, Folsom, Roundtree, Parrish, and Knight, migrated to claim land for farms and plantations. They brought enslaved African Americans or bought them through the domestic slave trade to work the cotton plantations.

Later improved to modern paved standards, much of the road remains in daily use.

== See also ==
- General Coffee State Park
- Coffee County, Georgia
