= Morven, Georgia =

- City
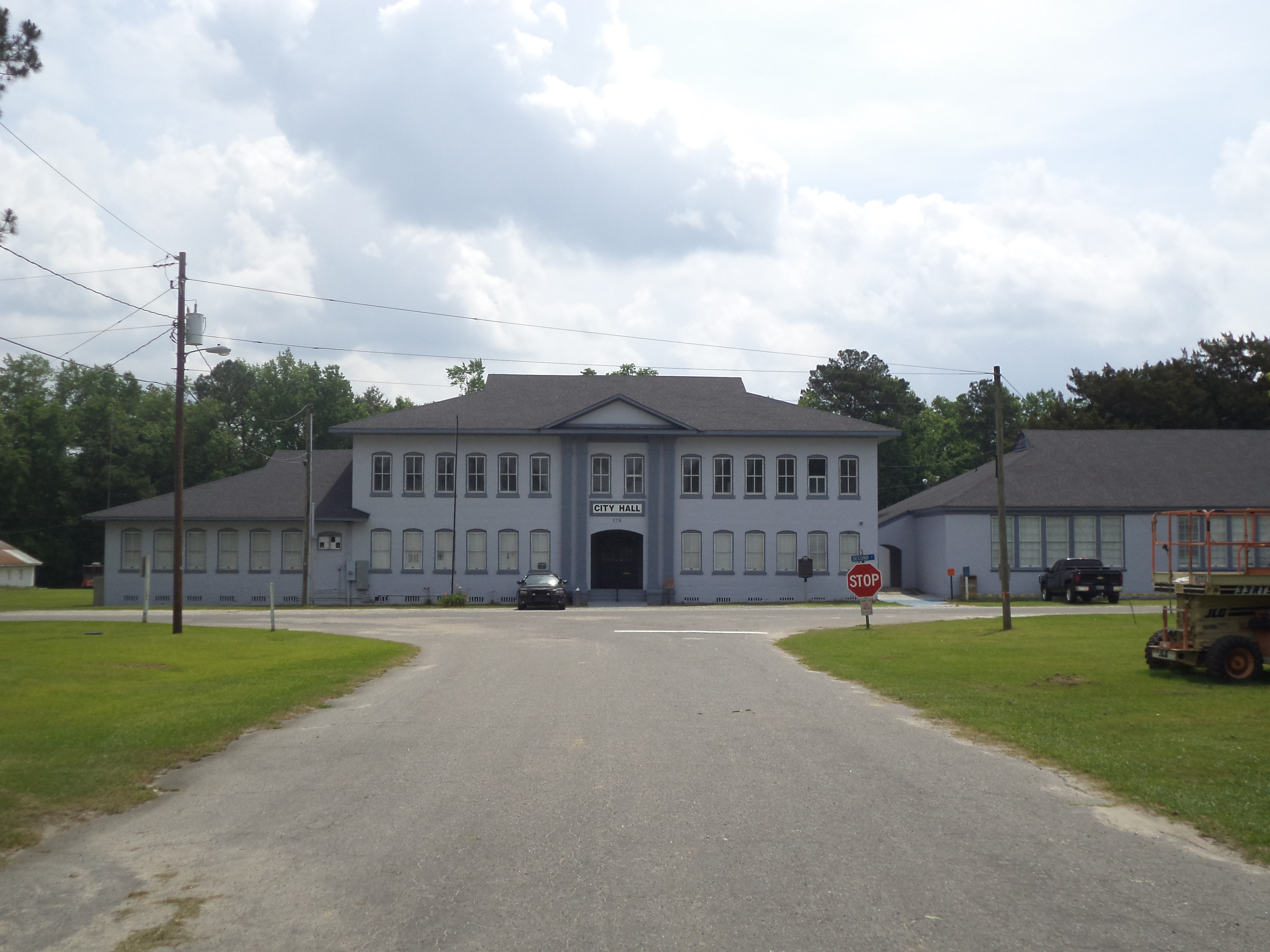
- Morven City Hall

- Seal

- Location in Brooks County and the state of Georgia
- Coordinates: 30°56′39″N 83°30′3″W
- Country: United States
- State: Georgia
- County: Brooks

Area
  - Total: 1.74 sq mi (4.51 km^{2})
  - Land: 1.73 sq mi (4.47 km^{2})
  - Water: 0.015 sq mi (0.04 km^{2})
- Elevation: 217 ft (66 m)

Population (2020)
  - Total: 506
  - Density: 293.4/sq mi (113.27/km^{2})
- Time zone: UTC-5 (Eastern (EST))
  - Summer (DST): UTC-4 (EDT)
- ZIP code: 31638
- Area code: 229
- FIPS code: 13-53032
- GNIS feature ID: 0318505
- Website: georgia.gov/cities-counties/morven

Morven is a city in Brooks County, Georgia, United States. It is part of the Valdosta metropolitan statistical area. The city was named after a mountain in Scotland. The population was 565 at the 2010 census, and 506 in 2020. It was formerly known as Sharpe's Store.

== History ==
Morven is the oldest community established by Europeans in Brooks County.

The Coffee Road was opened through Morven circa 1823. Sion Hall, one of the first settlers, saw an opportunity to use his sawmill and to farm. The area was developed for large cotton plantations, based on enslaved African-American field workers.

Circa 1826, Hamilton Sharpe built a store made of logs; he opened a post office in 1828. The community that grew up around the store became known as Sharpe's Store. In the same year a Methodist campground was established named Mount Zion. The post office and community was renamed Morven in 1853. At the end of the century, the South Georgia Railroad was built through Morven in 1897. The community was incorporated by the state legislature in 1900.

Cotton cultivation continued to be important in the early 20th century.

Hampton Smith owned the Old Joyce Place near Morven. Often hiring laborers through convict leasing, by which Smith paid police their high fees for minor infractions, Smith was known to be abusive to his black workers. On 16 May 1918, Smith was shot and killed by Sidney Johnson, a black worker whom he had severely beaten. During the ensuing manhunt in Brooks and Lowndes counties, white mobs captured at least 12 blacks and lynched them during the next few days. All but one were men; the victims included 19-year-old Mary Turner, who had denounced the lynching of her husband, and her eight-month-old fetus, cut from her body and also murdered at the site, on the west bank of the Little River.

A second railroad (Valdosta/Morven & Western RR) was built through Morven in the 1920s. In 1923 the town raised an $8,000 bond to provide a water system. A group of local women organized to gain installation of electric lights in August 1924. After World War II, the first paved road was built in the community in the winter of 1948 to 1949 from Quitman, the county seat of Brooks County.

== Geography ==
Morven is located at 30°56′39″N 83°30′03″W (30.944263, -83.500796).

According to the United States Census Bureau, the city has a total area of 1.7 square miles (4.5 km^{2}), of which 0.015 square miles (0.04 km^{2}), or 0.92%, is water.

Morven is located at the junction of State Highways 76 and 94 and is 8 miles (13 km) west of Interstate 75.

== Historical sites ==
=== Coffee Road ===
Coffee Road was opened up by the state legislature act approved December 23, 1822. $1500 was appropriated for the road, which started near Cunningham Ford on the Alapaha River southwest through districts 10, 12, and 13 of Irwin County continuing through Districts 18 and 23 of Early County to intersect the Florida state line near the Ochlockonee River.

== Demographics ==
Historical population
Census	Pop.	Note	%±
1910	383		—
1920	530		38.4%
1930	491		−7.4%
1940	512		4.3%
1950	474		−7.4%
1960	476		0.4%
1970	449		−5.7%
1980	471		4.9%
1990	536		13.8%
2000	634		18.3%
2010	565		−10.9%
2020	506		−10.4%
U.S. Decennial Census; 1850-1870 1870-1880; 1890-1910 1920-1930; 1940 1950 1960; 1970 1980 1990; 2000 2010 2020

=== Racial and ethnic composition ===
Morven city, Georgia – Racial and ethnic composition Note: the US Census treats Hispanic/Latino as an ethnic category. This table excludes Latinos from the racial categories and assigns them to a separate category. Hispanics/Latinos may be of any race.
Race / Ethnicity (NH = Non-Hispanic)	Pop 2000	Pop 2010	Pop 2020	% 2000	% 2010	% 2020
White alone (NH)	256	189	192	40.38%	33.45%	37.94%
Black or African American alone (NH)	330	321	249	52.05%	56.81%	49.21%
Native American or Alaska Native alone (NH)	1	1	0	0.16%	0.18%	0.00%
Asian alone (NH)	0	0	2	0.00%	0.00%	0.40%
Native Hawaiian or Pacific Islander alone (NH)	0	1	0	0.00%	0.18%	0.00%
Other race alone (NH)	0	0	0	0.00%	0.00%	0.00%
Mixed race or Multiracial (NH)	0	5	16	0.00%	0.88%	3.16%
Hispanic or Latino (any race)	47	48	47	7.41%	8.50%	9.29%
Total	634	565	506	100.00%	100.00%	100.00%

=== 2000 census ===
In 2000, there were 634 people, 225 households, and 152 families residing in the city. By 2020, its population declined to 506.

== Transportation ==
=== Major highways ===
- State Route 76
- State Route 133
- Coffee Road passes through the county.
