= Livestock Weekly =

Weekly newspaper published in San Angelo, Texas, US

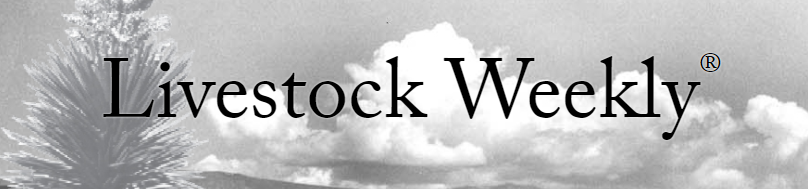
- Livestock Weekly Masthead (cropped)
- Type: Weekly newspaper
- Format: Tabloid
- Owner: Robert Frank
- Founder: Stanley R. Frank
- Publisher: Robert Frank
- Staff writers: Advertising: Paula Rankin; circulation: CiJi Dickson; sales, marketing and social media: Connor Frank; editorial: Colleen Schreiber; publisher: Robert S. Frank
- Previous title: West Texas Livestock Weekly
- Founded: 1948; 77 years ago
- Language: English
- Headquarters: 2601 Sherwood Way, San Angelo, Texas 76901
- ISSN: 0162-5047
- OCLC number: 3271370
- Website: www.livestockweekly.com

Livestock Weekly is a newspaper published in San Angelo, Texas, that provides international coverage of the livestock industry, focusing on cattle, sheep, goats, range conditions, markets, and ranch life. It was started by Stanley R. Frank in 1948 and was later referred to as "the cowboy's Wall Street Journal."

== History ==
After graduating from Barnhardt High School, working as a ranch hand, and dropping out of college, Stanley R. Frank held successive writing positions at the San Angelo Standard-Times, at a cattle publication in Memphis, at the Western Livestock Reporter in Los Angeles, and at the Midland Reporter-Telegram. He returned to San Angelo in the fall of 1948 to launch his own newspaper.

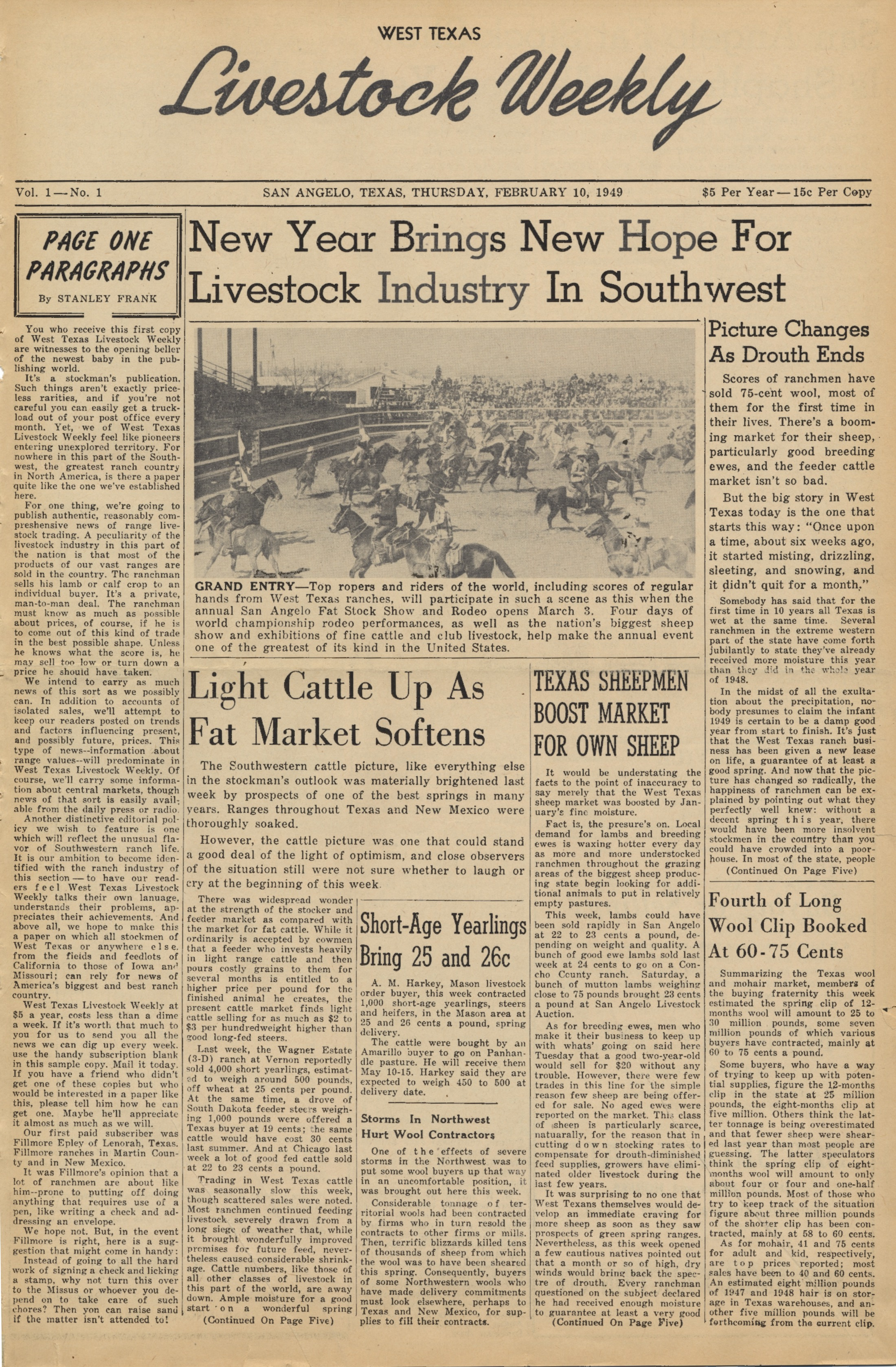
First Issue of West Texas Livestock Weekly, published February 10, 1949

Buoyed by a $5,000 loan from two San Angelo ranchers, Frank wrote, edited, provided photographs, and published the first issue on February 10, 1949, then called West Texas Livestock Weekly. Charlie Moss, a printer in San Angelo, produced 5,000 copies. The inaugural issue announced the publication's intention to "reflect the unusual flavor of southwestern ranch life ... [and identify] with the ranch industry of this section." Frank, who had no previous experience as a publisher, described the first issue as "pretty pitiful" and that publishing it was "sheer agony, comparable to giving birth to a porcupine, sideways." Thousands of complimentary copies were mailed out with the hope of signing on subscribers. Fillmore Epley of Lenorah, Texas, was the first paid subscriber. At the beginning, the main news items were country trades, an enumeration of how many head of livestock were traded at the local level, producer to producer. Frank gathered the bulk of his news by visiting with ranchers in the lobby of the St. Angelus Hotel, a nexus of West Texas livestock trading in San Angelo.

In its early days, the newspaper lost money, and its survival seemed bleak. Frank hired editorial help, and by 1950 the newspaper was turning a profit. In 1977, the publication changed its name to Livestock Weekly after its coverage expanded beyond West Texas. Eventually, the publication earned a dedicated readership and reached a circulation of 16,000 in 1984. By 1996, circulation had climbed to 20,000 subscribers located in the contiguous United States, Canada, Mexico, and Australia, with most subscribers located in Texas, New Mexico, Oklahoma, Kansas, and Colorado. In 1996, after forty-seven years of publishing, the weekly had not solicited an ad or subscription.

A large part of the publication's success rests on Frank's background as a rancher, his embrace of the ethos of ranch life, and his dedication to reporting accurate livestock market information, along with his ability to weave humor into his writing. Stanley popularized the cartoonist Ace Reid, first publishing his work in the May 5, 1949, issue. Elmer Kelton also became a regular writer for the weekly after Stanley hired him in 1971. Other writers and artists that appeared in the weekly include John Erickson, Baxter Black, Doc Blakely, and Curt Brummett.
