= USS Lanier =

Attack transport ship in United States Navy

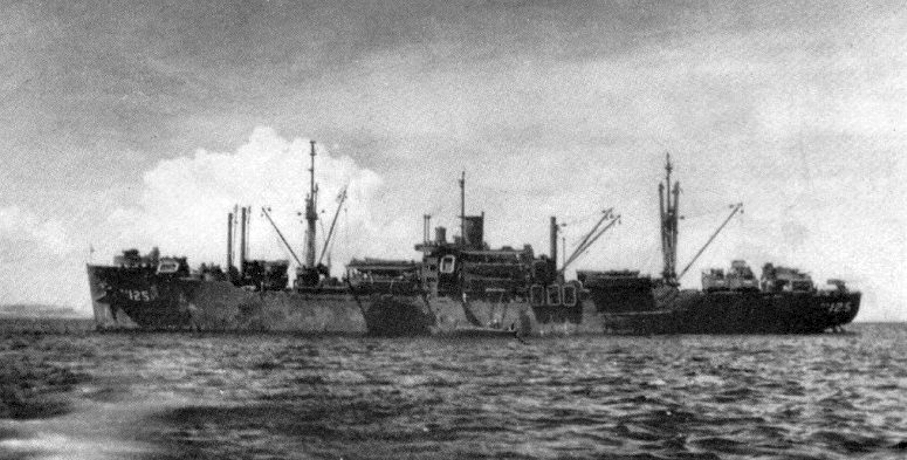

History

United States
- Name: USS Lanier
- Namesake: Lanier County, Georgia
- Builder: California Shipbuilding
- Laid down: 25 June 1944
- Launched: 29 August 1944
- Commissioned: 22 December 1944
- Decommissioned: 5 March 1946
- Honors and awards: 1 Battle star
- Fate: Sold for scrap, 9 April 1973

General characteristics
- Class & type: Haskell-class attack transport
- Displacement: 6,873 tons (lt), 14,837 t (fl)
- Length: 455 ft (139 m)
- Beam: 62 ft (19 m)
- Draft: 24 ft (7 m)
- Propulsion: 1 × geared turbine, 2 × header-type boilers, 1 × propeller, designed 8,500 shp (6,338 kW)
- Speed: 17 knots (31 km/h; 20 mph)
- Boats & landing craft carried: 2 × LCM; 12 × LCVP; 3 × LCPL
- Capacity: Troops: 86 officers, 1,475 enlisted; Cargo: 150,000 cu ft, 2,900 tons
- Complement: 56 officers, 480 enlisted
- Armament: 1 × 5"/38 dual-purpose gun; 4 × twin 40mm guns; 10 × single 20mm guns; late armament, add 1 × 40mm quad mount

USS Lanier (APA-125) was a Haskell-class attack transport in service with the United States Navy from 1944 to 1946. She was scrapped in 1973.

== History ==
Lanier was a Victory ship design type and was named for Lanier County, Georgia, which was named for poet Sidney Lanier. She was laid down 25 June 1944 by the California Shipbuilding Corporation, Wilmington, Los Angeles, under a Maritime Commission contract. She was a VC2-S-AP5 Victory ship design type and her yard number was TR 8 and her hull number was MCV 39. She was launched 29 August 1944; sponsored by Mrs. Earl English; acquired by the Navy 22 December 1944; and commissioned the same day at Oakland, California.

After shakedown, Lanier departed San Francisco 23 February 1945 and arrived Pearl Harbor 2 March to practice landing operations. Loaded with 1,485 soldiers, she got underway 28 March and steamed in convoy with 11 other transports and five merchantmen for the Volcano Islands. Touching Eniwetok and Saipan, she reached Iwo Jima 20 April and discharged men and cargo. She returned to Saipan 22 to 24 April, took on board equipment and 1,442 troops, then sailed to Okinawa 2 to 6 May. There she landed reinforcements and embarked 66 battle casualties before returning to Saipan 8 to 13 May. On the next day she embarked 254 survivors from Little (DD-803), sunk by enemy air attack while on radar picket duty west of Okinawa 3 May.

Steaming to San Francisco 14 to 30 May, Lanier proceeded to Seattle 31 May. The civilian harbor pilot entered the harbor too fast, turned to avoid a collision with a passenger ferry and ran between a barge and its tug. The collision sunk the barge, injured a civilian and sustained damage to the bow and forward ballast tanks. She was put in dry dock for repairs until 2 June, embarked 1,442 troops, and departed 12 June for the Far East. She sailed via Pearl Harbor, Eniwetok, and Ulithi and reached Okinawa 24 July. She operated off Okinawa until 6 August, then carried 798 passengers via Ulithi to Guam, where she arrived the 14th. She embarked over 1,300 occupation troops the following day and sailed as part of Task Force 31 for occupation landings on Japan. She anchored in Sagami Wan 27 August, and during midwatch 30 August entered Tokyo Bay to begin landing operations off Yokosuka. Her landing craft carried troops in the first wave and landed them at Yokosuka Airport at 0920. Steaming to Saipan 1 to 5 September, Lanier embarked marines of the 2d Division and carried them to Nagasaki, Kyūshū, 18 to 23 September.

Sailing in convoy 26 September, Lanier reached Manila Bay, Luzon, 1 October and joined the "Magic Carpet" fleet. She proceeded to Saipan 16 to 21 October, embarked 1,851 homeward-bound veterans, and departed the 22d for Seattle, Wash., where she arrived 4 November. On 28 November she departed once more for the southwest Pacific. Reaching New Guinea 17 December, she embarked 1,598 troops at Hollandia, 532 troops at Finschhafen, and departed 21 December for the west coast. She arrived San Pedro 6 January 1946. Lanier sailed for the east coast 19 January 1946, and reached Norfolk 4 February. She decommissioned at Norfolk 5 March 1946 and was turned over to the War Shipping Administration 8 March. She was placed in the James River Reserve Fleet (JRRF).

=== Fate ===
In 1956 Lanier was withdrawn from the Reserve Fleet as part of a Repair Program, GAA-American Hawaiian, and then returned. On 9 April 1973 she was sold to Union Minerals & Alloy Corp., for $111,560, to be scrapped.

== Awards ==
Lanier received one battle star for World War II service.

== Notable Crewmembers ==
Ace Reid (10 March 1925 – 10 November 1991) was a Machinist's Mate, First Class aboard Lanier and created the western cartoon, "Cowpokes." His main character, "Jake", was born on board the Lanier. "Jake" first appeared as "The Sorry Salt" in the ship's newspaper. Reid was on duty in the engine room during the tugboat-barge incident in Seattle.
