= Lakeland, Georgia =

- City
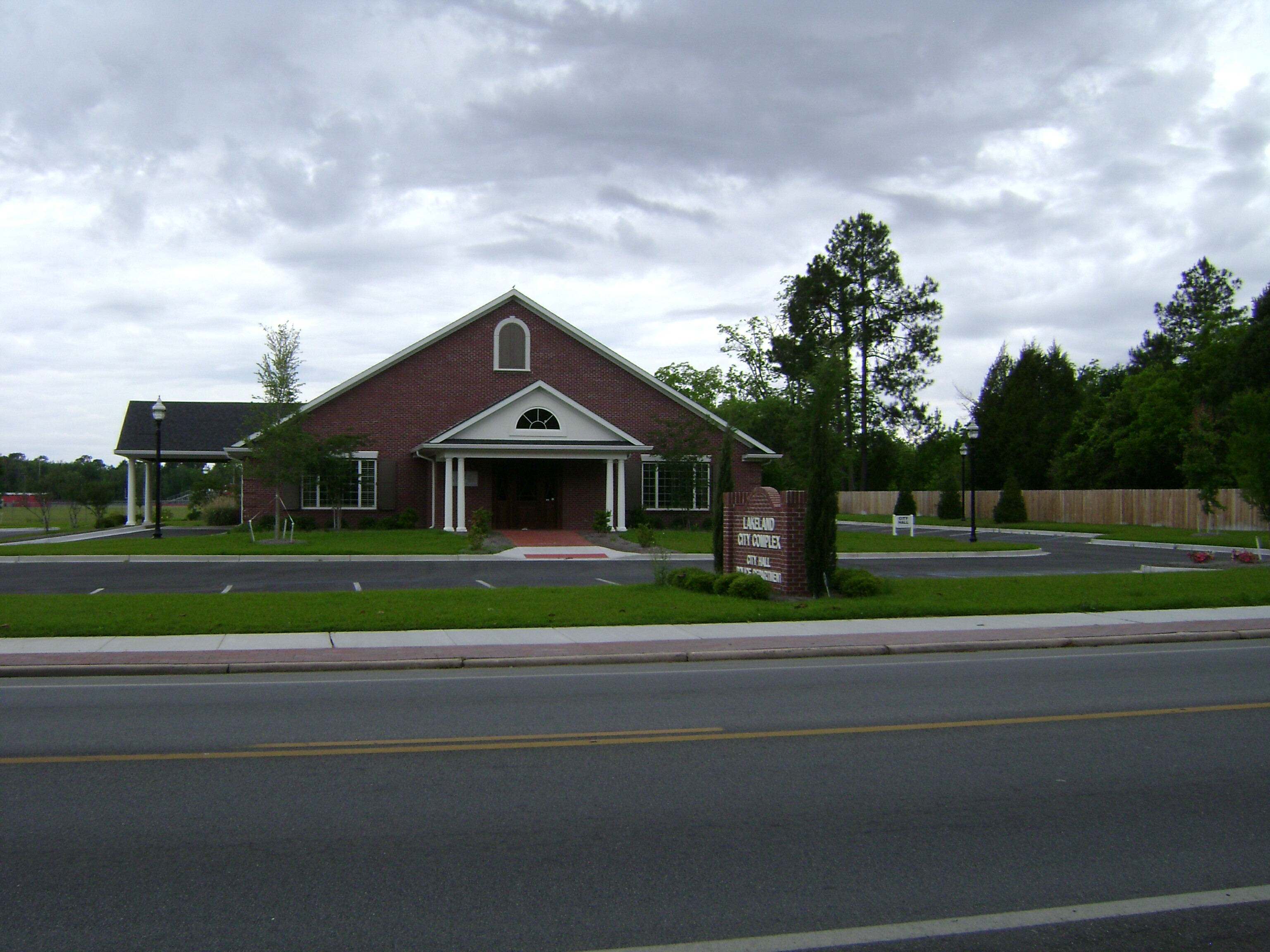
- Lakeland City Hall and Lakeland Police Department

- Location in Lanier County and the state of Georgia
- Coordinates: 31°2′21″N 83°4′13″W
- Country: United States
- State: Georgia
- County: Lanier

Area
  - Total: 3.15 sq mi (8.16 km^{2})
  - Land: 3.10 sq mi (8.04 km^{2})
  - Water: 0.046 sq mi (0.12 km^{2})
- Elevation: 200 ft (61 m)

Population (2020)
  - Total: 2,875
  - Density: 926.7/sq mi (357.79/km^{2})
- Time zone: UTC-5 (Eastern (EST))
  - Summer (DST): UTC-4 (EDT)
- ZIP code: 31635
- Area code: 229
- FIPS code: 13-44592
- GNIS feature ID: 0356347
- Website: https://lakelandga.gov/

Lakeland is a city and the county seat of Lanier County, Georgia, United States. The city is the county seat of Lanier County. It is part of the Valdosta metropolitan area. The population was 2,875 at the 2020 census.

Originally called Alapaha and then Milltown or Mill Town, Lakeland received its current name in 1925 in honor of its proximity to Grand Bay Lake, Lake Irma, and Banks Lake. For many years, Lakeland owned and operated its own railroad.

== History ==
By the late 1830s, a community known as Alapaha had come into existence along the road from Waresboro, Georgia, to Troupville, Georgia, near the mill established by Joshua Lee on what is now Banks Lake National Wildlife Refuge. In 1838, a post office was established and was officially named Alapaha after the nearby Alapaha River. In 1848, Joshua Lee sold his mill to William Lastinger. In the 1850s, additional mills were established in the area and the population of the community continued to grow. In 1857, Alapaha was renamed Milltown. During the American Civil, William Lastinger sold his mill to Henry Banks. Milltown was incorporated in 1901. In 1919, Milltown was designated seat of the newly formed Lanier County. In 1928, the city was incorporated and renamed to its present form of Lakeland.

== Geography ==
Lakeland is located at 31°2′21″N 83°4′13″W (31.039214, -83.070397).

According to the United States Census Bureau, the city has a total area of 3.1 square miles (8.0 km^{2}), of which 3.1 square miles (8.0 km^{2}) is land and 0.04 square miles (0.10 km^{2}) (1.28%) is water.

== Demographics ==
Historical population
Census	Pop.	Note	%±
1910	1,247		—
1920	860		−31.0%
1930	1,006		17.0%
1940	1,502		49.3%
1950	1,551		3.3%
1960	2,236		44.2%
1970	2,569		14.9%
1980	2,647		3.0%
1990	2,467		−6.8%
2000	2,730		10.7%
2010	3,366		23.3%
2020	2,875		−14.6%
U.S. Decennial Census; 1850-1870 1870-1880; 1890-1910 1920-1930; 1940 1950 1960; 1970 1980 1990; 2000 2010

=== 2020 census ===
As of the 2020 census, there were 2,875 people, 997 households, and 631 families residing in the city.

The median age was 36.3 years. 24.6% of residents were under the age of 18 and 15.8% of residents were 65 years of age or older. For every 100 females there were 104.5 males, and for every 100 females age 18 and over there were 101.4 males age 18 and over.

0.0% of residents lived in urban areas, while 100.0% lived in rural areas.

Among households in Lakeland, 34.8% had children under the age of 18 living in them. Of all households, 28.8% were married-couple households, 22.0% were households with a male householder and no spouse or partner present, and 39.1% were households with a female householder and no spouse or partner present. About 32.1% of all households were made up of individuals and 13.8% had someone living alone who was 65 years of age or older.

There were 1,211 housing units, of which 15.9% were vacant. The homeowner vacancy rate was 1.5% and the rental vacancy rate was 6.1%.

Lakeland racial composition as of 2020
Race	Num.	Perc.
White (non-Hispanic)	1,486	51.69%
Black or African American (non-Hispanic)	1,152	40.07%
Native American	3	0.1%
Asian	26	0.9%
Pacific Islander	6	0.21%
Other/Mixed	114	3.97%
Hispanic or Latino	88	3.06%

== Education ==
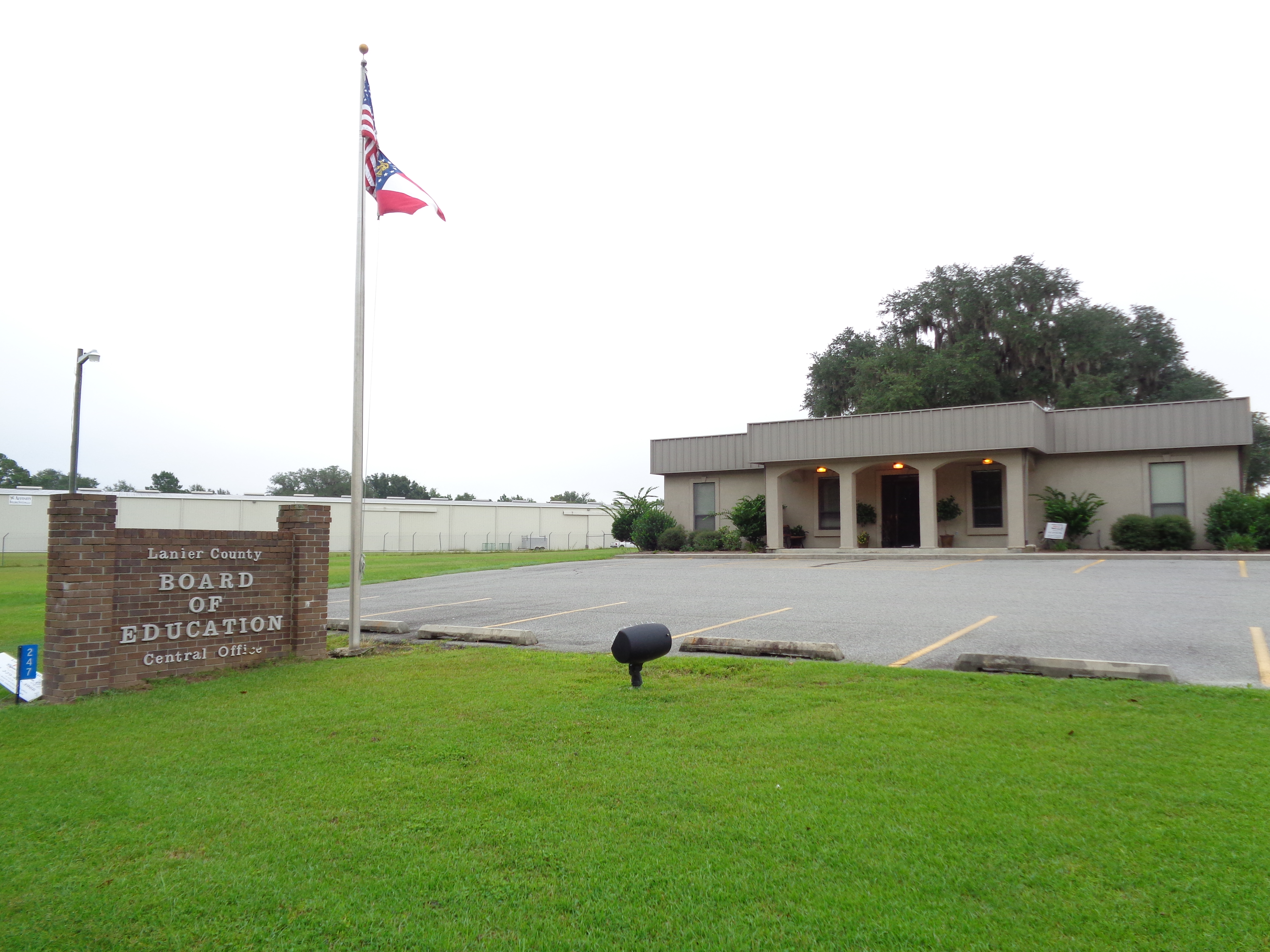
Lanier County School District headquarters

The Lanier County School District holds grades pre-school to grade twelve, and consists of two elementary schools, a middle school, and a high school. The district has 94 full-time teachers and over 1,345 students.

- Lanier County Primary School
- Lanier County Elementary School
- Lanier County Middle School
- Lanier County High School

The South Georgia Regional Library operates the W. L. Miller Memorial Library in Lakeland. Initially the community was served by a library that was only open during school periods, and therefore people in the community considered it to be a school library rather than a complete community library. This small library opened in the courthouse office of the superintendent of the county school system in 1950. It was relocated to the Lanier County Primary School's Kindergarten building and then to a portion of Lanier County High School. The first standalone library, then the Lanier-Lakeland Library, opened on May 18, 1980. The current facility, built as part of a State of Georgia grant-funded library wave and partially financed by the W. L. Miller family through a $45,000 donation, opened on March 13, 1988. It was renovated from August 9 through August 23, 2012.

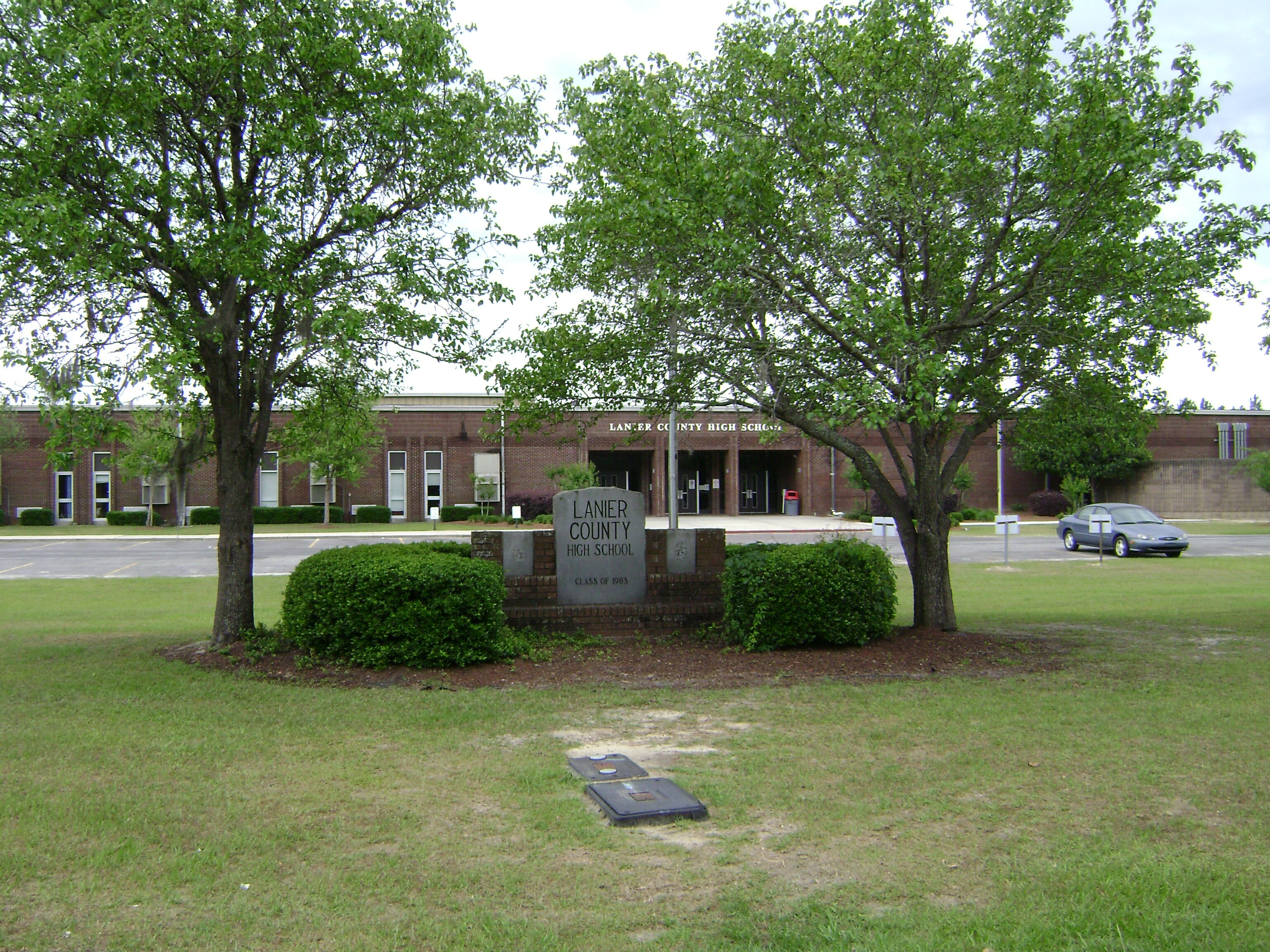
Lanier County High School

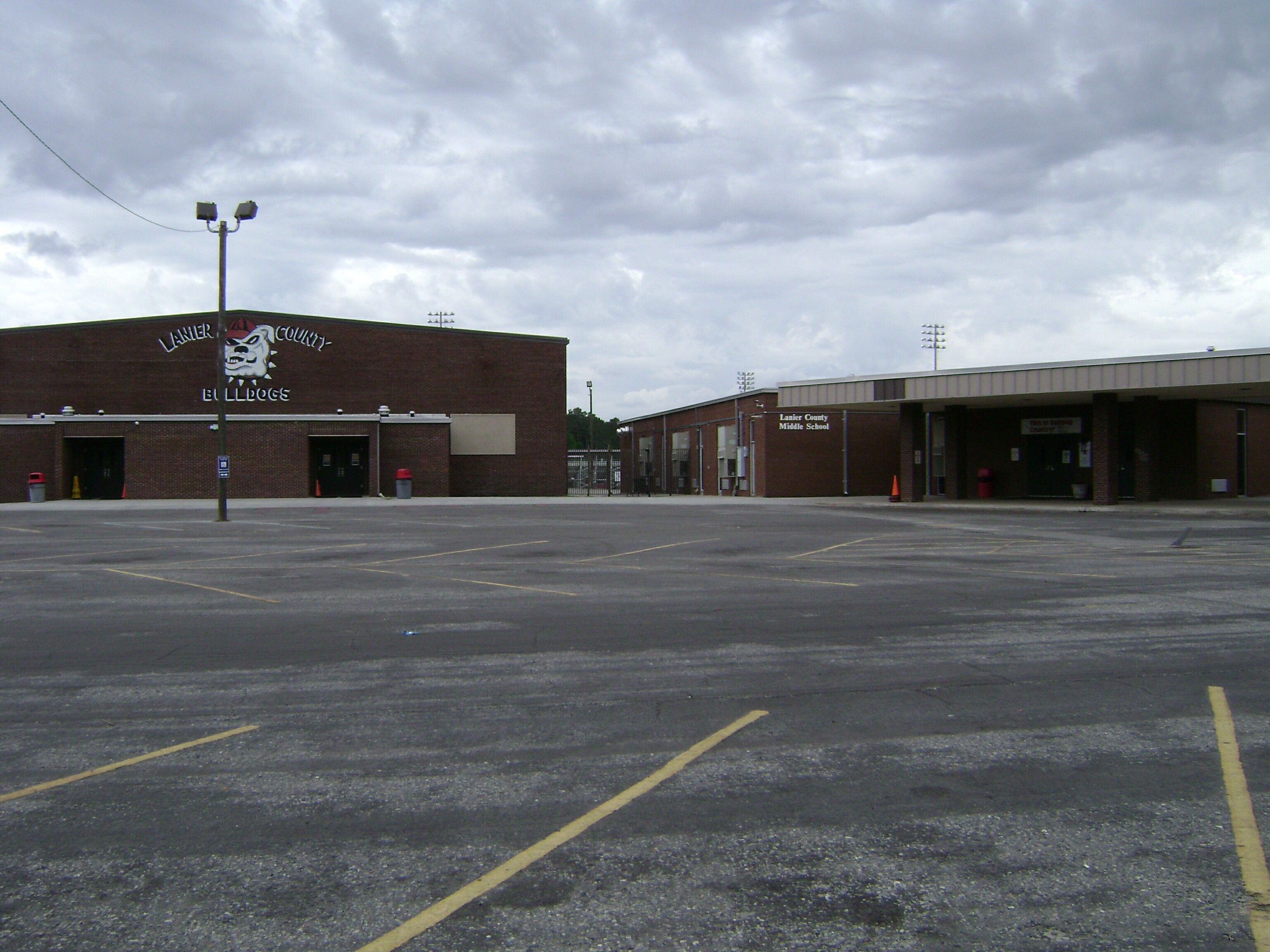
Lanier County Middle School

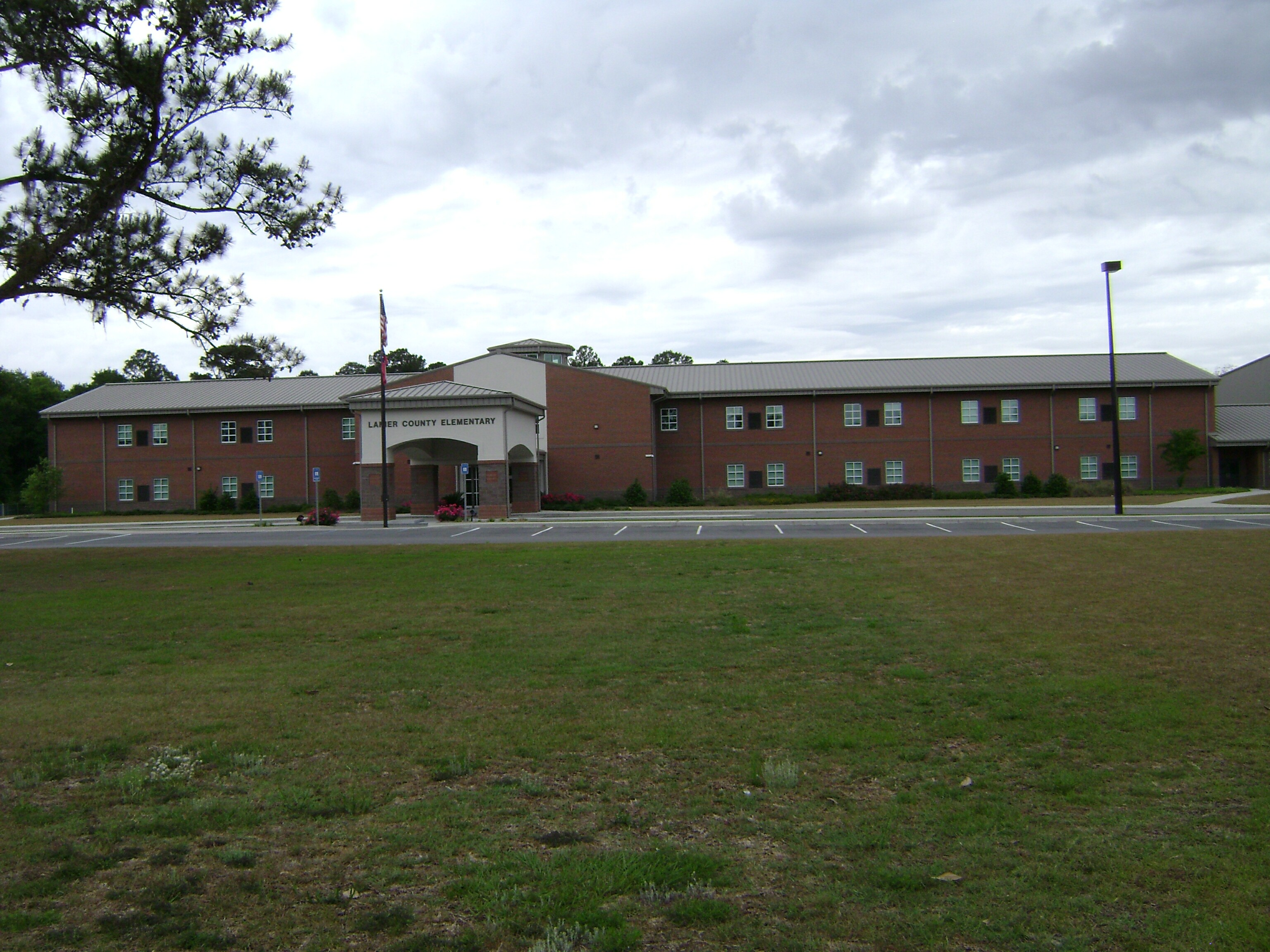
Lanier County Elementary School

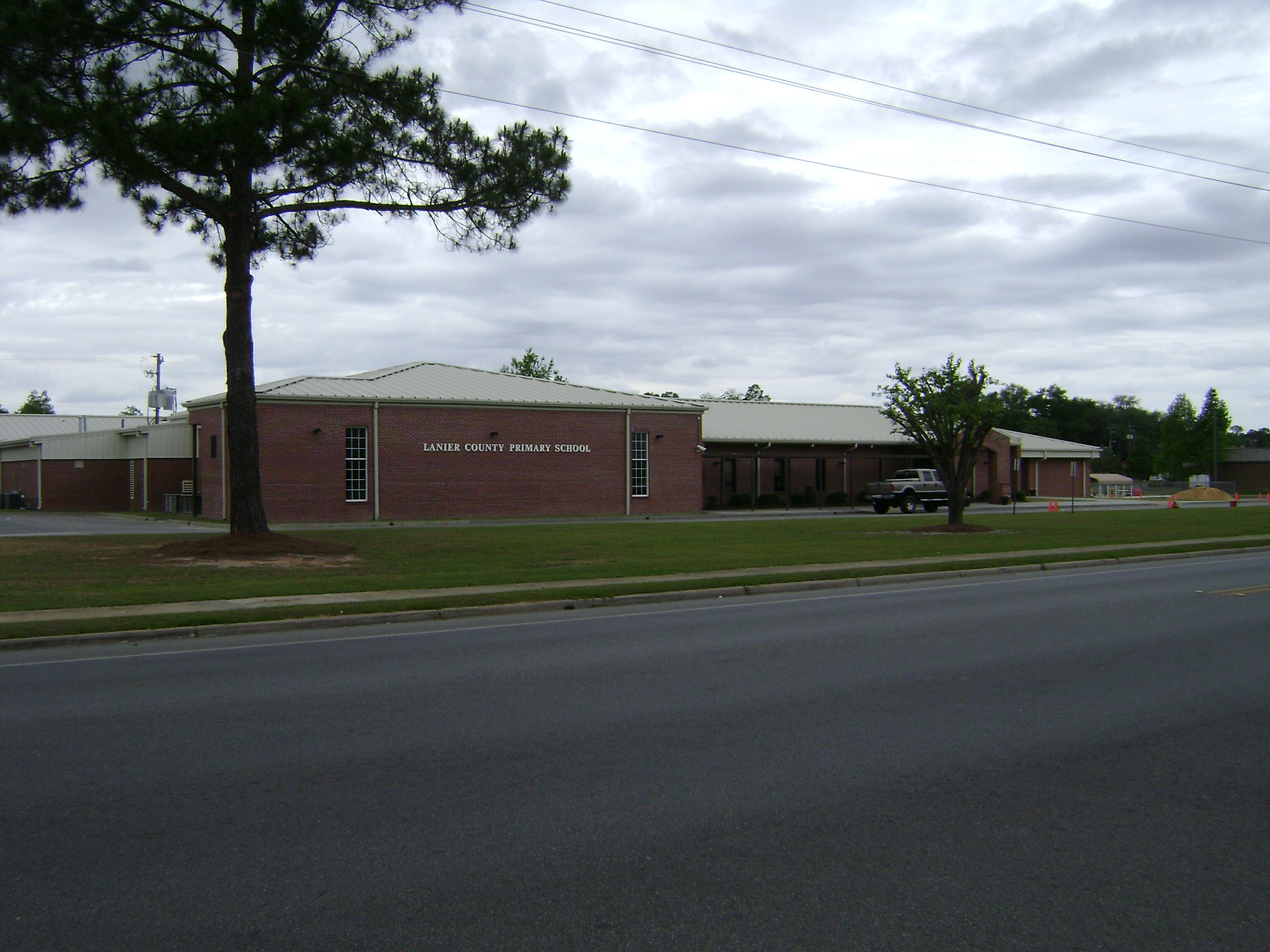
Lanier County Primary School

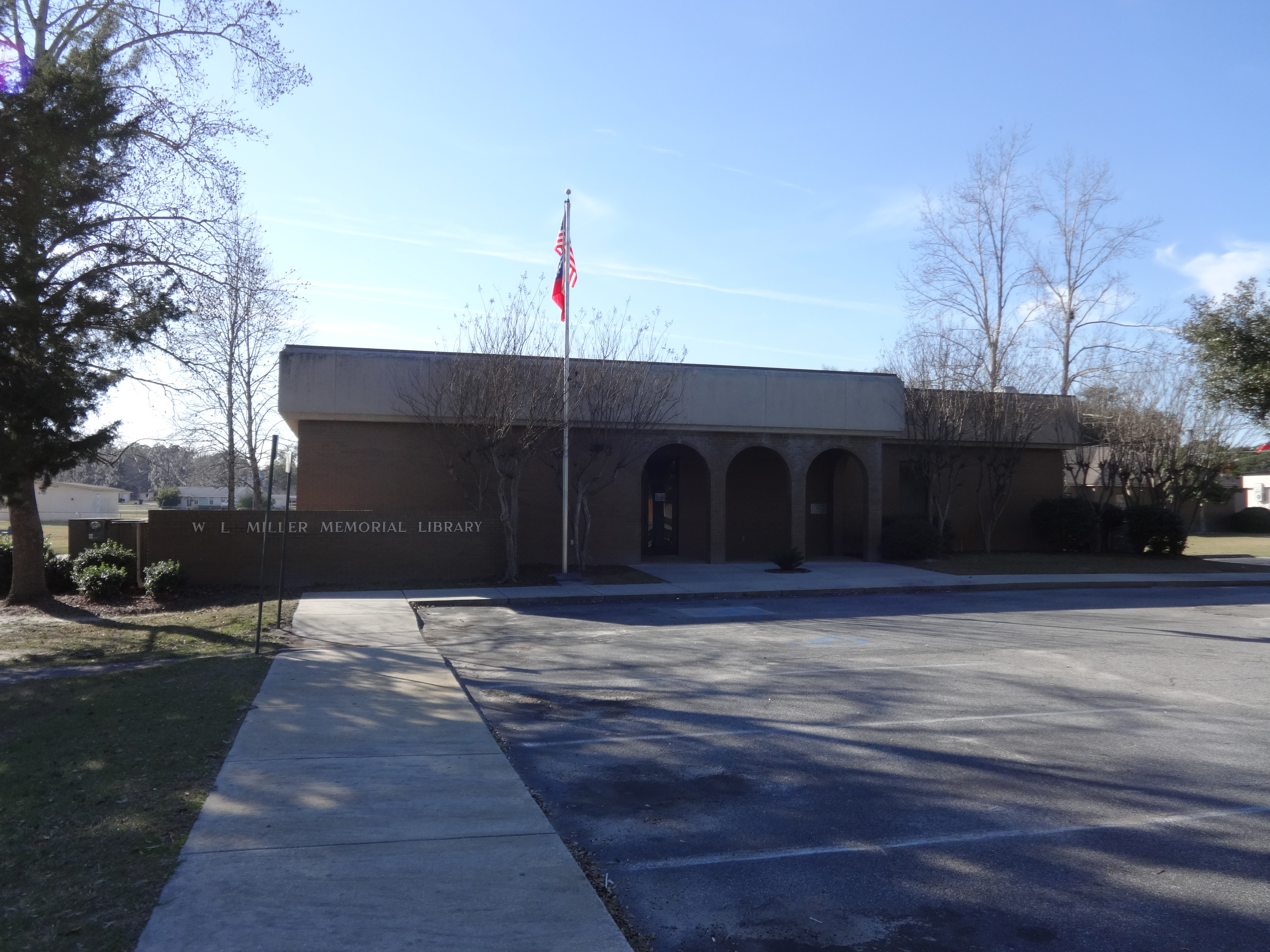
W. L. Miller Memorial Library of the South Georgia Regional Library
