= Banks Lake National Wildlife Refuge =

Wildlife refuge in Georgia, USA

- IUCN category IV (habitat/species management area)
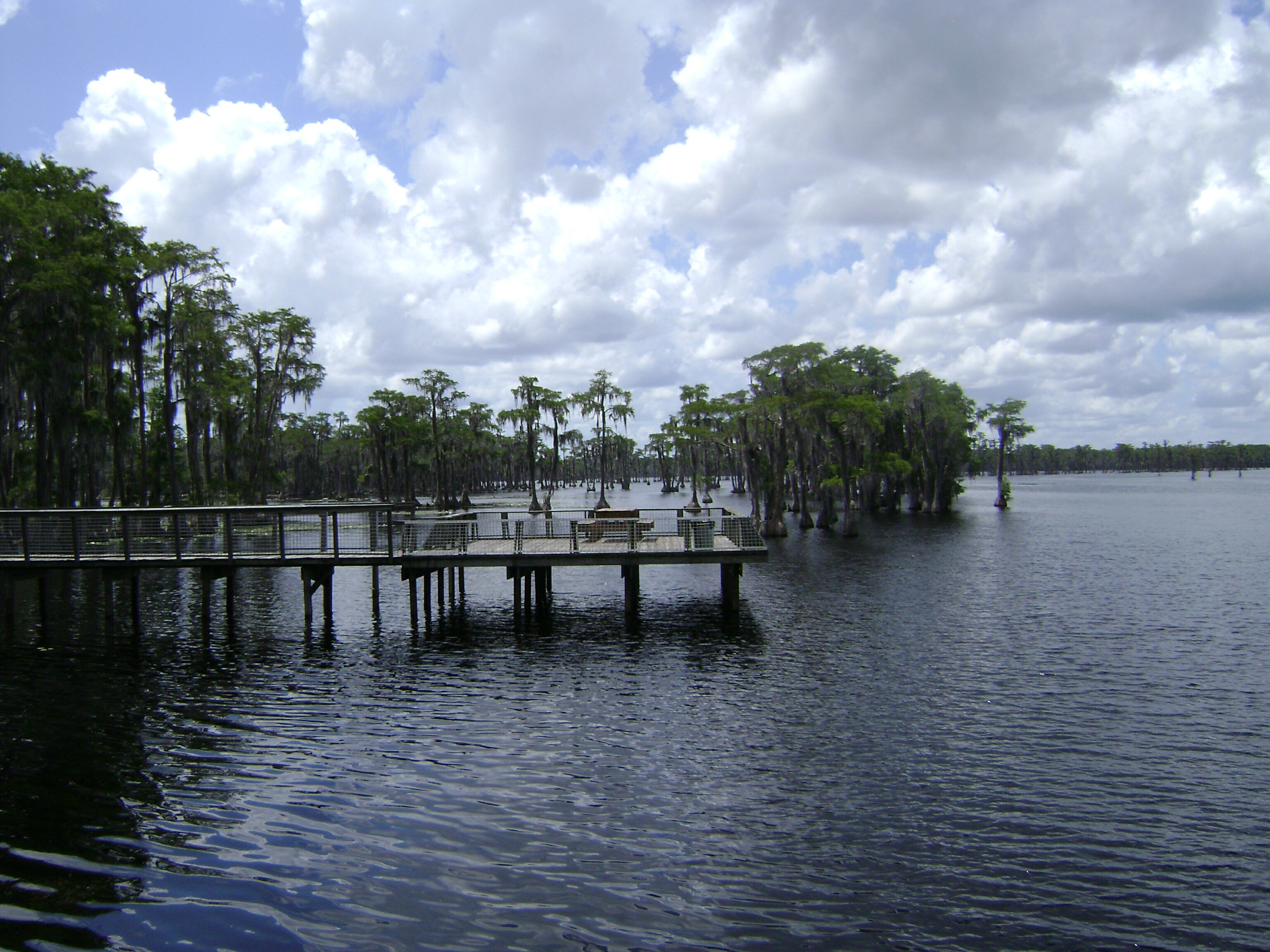
- View in Banks Lake National Wildlife Refuge

- Location within Georgia
- Location: Lanier County, Georgia, United States
- Nearest city: Lakeland, Georgia
- Coordinates: 31.01969910°N 83.12750244°W
- Area: 4,049 acres (1,639 ha)
- Established: 1985
- Visitors: 20,000 (in 2005)
- Governing body: U.S. Fish and Wildlife Service
- Website: Banks Lake National Wildlife Refuge

The Banks Lake National Wildlife Refuge is a 4,049 acre (16.4 km^{2}) National Wildlife Refuge located in Lanier County, Georgia. Banks Lake is a natural pocosin or sink of ancient geologic origin. The refuge was established in 1985 for the protection and conservation of this unique environment as well as migratory and resident wildlife.

An estimated 20,000 people visit the refuge each year. There is no dedicated budget or staff for the refuge; it is administered completely by the Okefenokee National Wildlife Refuge.

== History ==
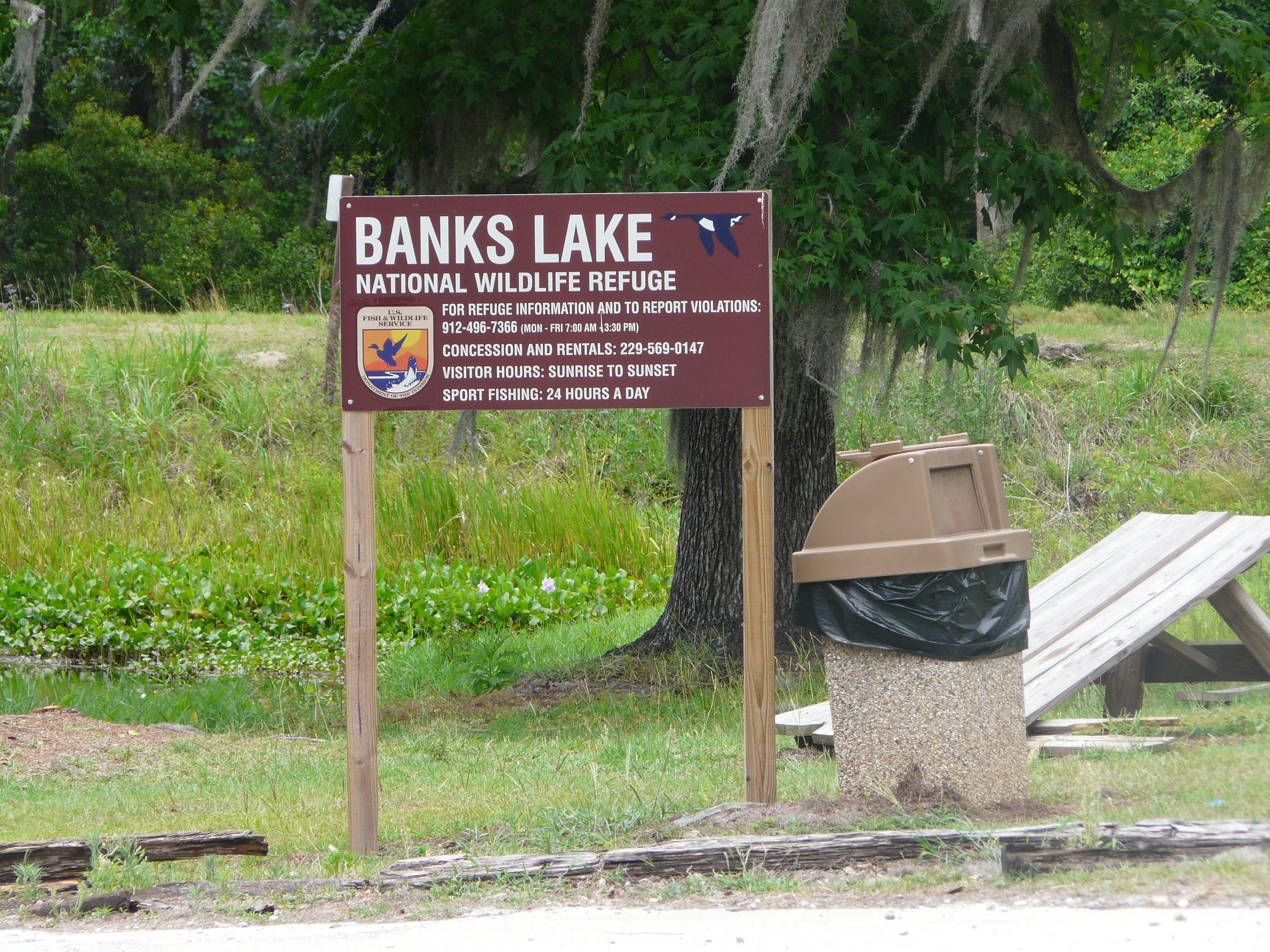
Entrance sign for the refuge.

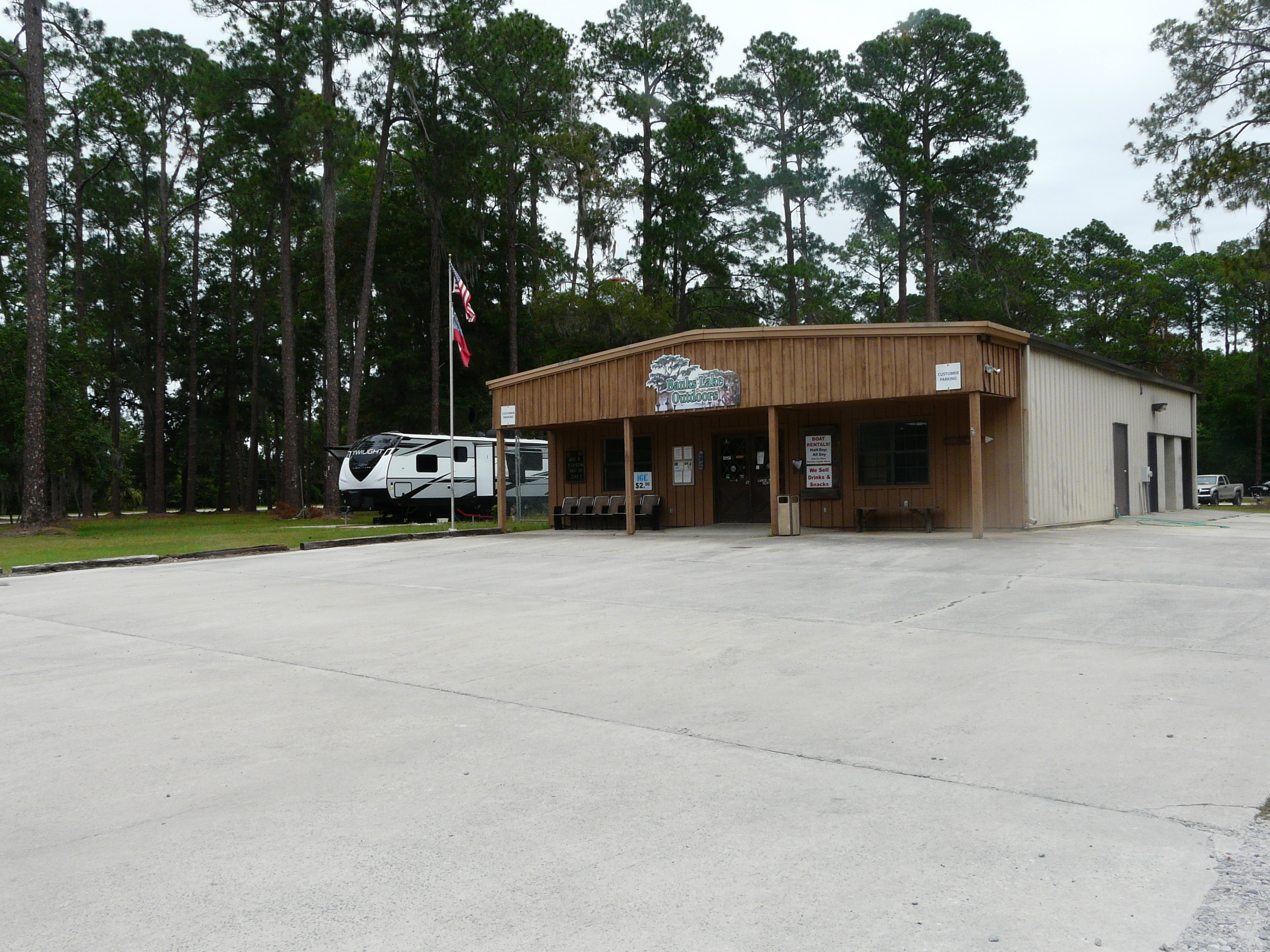
Banks Lake NWR concessionaire.

Banks Lake is a natural pocosin or mill pond probably created by tidal action of the ocean and shaped by a more temperate climate thousands of years ago.

In the mid-19th century, Joshua Lee built a low-level dam across the drainage creek on his property and utilized the impounded running water to power a grist mill to grind corn, wheat, and rice. The impounded lake and accompanying mill established the area as a trade center along the early stagecoach route between Waresboro, Georgia and Thomasville, Georgia.

In the 1920s, the E.D. Rivers family attempted to develop the area around the lake for electric power and land development.

In the 1970s, the E.D. Rivers Estate threatened to drain the lake and harvest the "lightered stumps" and cypress trees.

The Nature Conservancy purchased the land from the E.D. Rivers Estate on March 14, 1980. In April, 1980, the United States Fish and Wildlife Service entered into a lease agreement with The Nature Conservancy for management and operation of Banks Lake. On February 22, 1985, the U.S. Fish and Wildlife Service purchased Banks Lake from The Nature Conservancy and redesignated it as the Banks Lake National Wildlife Refuge.

== Topography ==
Banks Lake is a natural pocosin probably created by tidal action of the ocean and shaped by a more temperate climate thousands of years ago. Of the 4,049 acres (16.4 km^{2}), approximately 1,000 acres (4 km^{2}) is open water. The remainder consists of marsh, hardwood swamp, and uplands.

== Facilities ==
Fishing is permitted year-round on the lake in accordance with Georgia State fishing laws. Sportfish most caught include largemouth bass, chain pickerel, crappie, bluegill, warmouth perch, flier, and catfish.

A short walking trail, boardwalk and platform are provided for wildlife viewing opportunities

A concession, the Banks Lake Outdoors, rents canoes and kayaks and sells fishing and hunting licenses, bait and tackle, gifts, and snacks.

== See also ==
- List of National Wildlife Refuges
