= USS Picket (ACM-8) =

Chimo-class minelayer

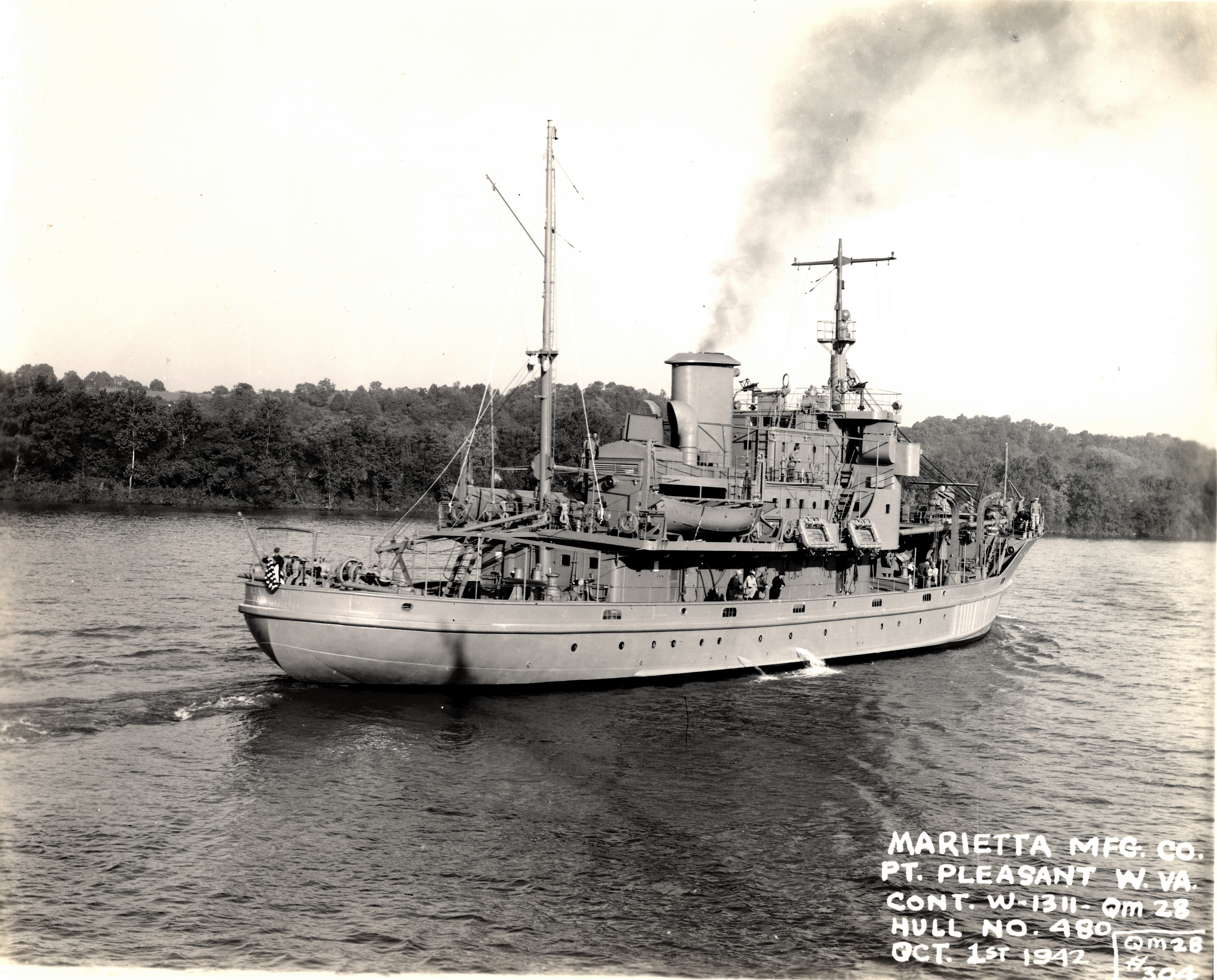
- Army M 1 Mine Planter USAMP MP-7 Major General Wallace F. Randolph a sister ship to USAMP-1 General Henry Knox

History

United States
- Name: USS Picket (ACM-8)
- Builder: Marietta Manufacturing Company, Point Pleasant, West Virginia
- Laid down: as USAMP-1 General Henry Knox for the U.S. Army Mine Planter Service
- Completed: 1942 – Navy conversion: 15 March 1945
- Acquired: 2 January 1945
- Commissioned: 6 March 1945
- Decommissioned: 24 June 1946
- Reclassified: ACM-8, 5 March 1945
- Stricken: 19 July 1946
- Fate: Transferred to the Coast Guard, 24 June 1946

General characteristics
- Class & type: Chimo-class Auxiliary Minelayer
- Displacement: 1,320 long tons (1,341 t) full
- Length: 188 ft 2 in (57.35 m)
- Beam: 37 ft (11 m)
- Draft: 12 ft 6 in (3.81 m)
- Propulsion: Skinner Engine Company reciprocating steam engine; 2 Combustion Engineering boilers; twin propellers; 1,200 SHP.
- Speed: 12.5 knots (23.2 km/h; 14.4 mph)
- Complement: 69
- Armament: 1 × 40 mm gun

United States
- Name: Willow (WAGL/WLB-332)
- Acquired: 1947
- Commissioned: 20 September 1947
- Decommissioned: 10 October 1969
- Identification: IMO number: 7338298
- Fate: Deleted from registers 1993

General characteristics
- Displacement: 1,240 long tons (1,260 t) full
- Length: 188 ft 2 in (57.35 m)
- Beam: 37 ft (11 m)
- Draft: 12 ft 6 in (3.81 m)
- Propulsion: Skinner Engine Company reciprocating steam engine; 2 Combustion Engineering boilers; twin propellers; 1,200 SHP.
- Speed: 12.5 knots (23.2 km/h; 14.4 mph)
- Range: 2,450 miles @ 8.5 knots (15.7 km/h; 9.8 mph)
- Complement: 52
- Armament: Small arms only
- Notes: 20-ton boom capacity

USS Picket (ACM–8) was a Chimo-class minelayer of the United States Navy during World War II.

Picket was completed 15 April 1942 by Marietta Manufacturing Co., Point Pleasant, West Virginia, as the U.S. Army mine planter USAMP-1 General Henry Knox as the first of the WW II period planters built for the U.S. Army Mine Planter Service. USAMP Knox was transferred to the U.S. Navy 2 January 1945; completed conversion to an Auxiliary Minelayer, ACM-8, at Charleston Navy Yard 5 March 1945; and commissioned 6 March 1945.

== Service history ==
=== Pacific Theatre operations ===
Picket departed Charleston, South Carolina, on 11 March 1945, and arrived Little Creek, Virginia, 13 March. Following shakedown, she reported for duty 3 April to Commander, Service Force, Atlantic, Norfolk, Virginia. Loaded with minesweeping equipment, she departed Norfolk 26 April, transited the Panama Canal 7 May, and arrived San Diego, 20 May. Following training, Picket departed San Diego 9 June, and proceeded via Pearl Harbor, Eniwetok, Guam, and Saipan to Okinawa, arriving 28 July to serve as minesweeper tender.

Picket departed Okinawa on 16 August, and, following rendezvous with Task Force 31 on the 21st, she entered Tokyo Bay on the 28th. With minesweepers, she departed Tokyo Bay on 12 September, and arrived at Wakayama, Japan, on the 14th.

Sailing from Kii Suido on 20 September, she entered the Inland Sea on the 22nd. Through 31 October she operated with minesweepers to clear the approaches to Hiro, Kure, Gunchū, and Matsuyama for U.S. Army landings.

=== Navy Decommissioning ===
Following postwar occupation duties, Picket returned to the United States. She decommissioned 24 June 1946, and was transferred to the U.S. Coast Guard that date. She was struck from the Naval Vessel Register 19 July 1946.

== U.S. Coast Guard ==
The ex-Picket (ACM 8) ex-General Henry Knox was commissioned 20 September 1947 as USCGC Willow (WAGL/WLB-332). The ship was converted to a buoy tender and assigned to San Juan, Puerto Rico from 23 July 1947 until transfer to San Francisco, California during June 1949. Willow's area of responsibility extended from San Luis Obispo Bay to the Golden Gate, northern San Francisco Bay, San Pablo Bay and Suisun and shared logistics support of the Farallon Island Light Station and the San Francisco Lightship with USCGC Magnolia (WAGL/WLB-328). On 10 October 1969 Willow was decommissioned and stored at the Coast Guard Training Support Center in Alameda, California. As a buoy tender, the largest in the Coast Guard at time of conversion, duties were tending navigational aids and conducting search and rescue and law enforcement as needed.

== See also ==
- List of ships of the United States Army
- U.S. Army mine planter
