= USS Runels =

Buckley-class destroyer escort

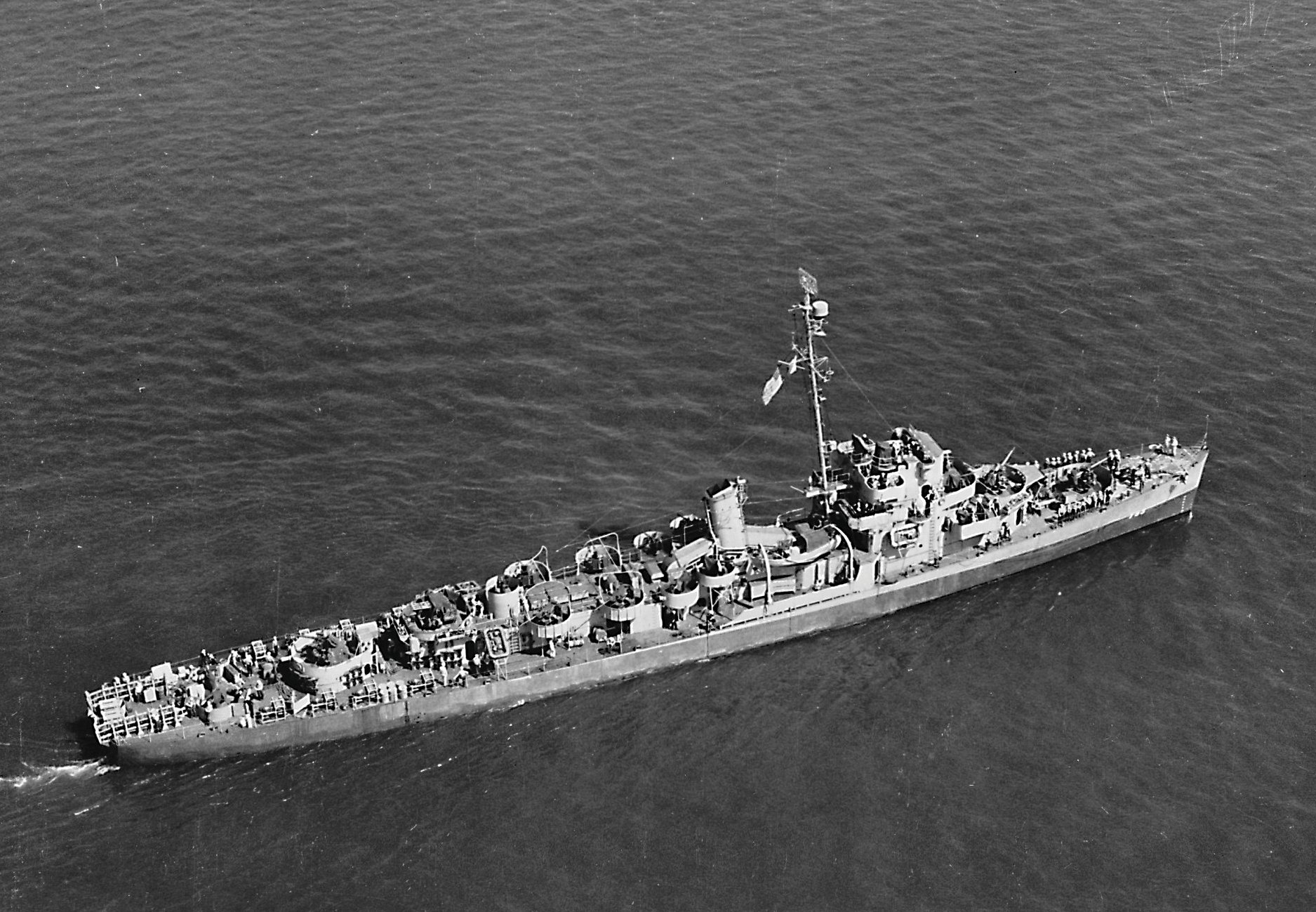
- USS Runels (DE-793 / APD-85)

History

United States
- Laid down: 7 June 1943
- Launched: 4 September 1943
- Commissioned: 3 January 1944
- Reclassified: APD-85, 15 December 1944
- Decommissioned: 10 February 1947
- Stricken: 1 June 1960
- Fate: Sold for scrap, 10 July 1961

General characteristics
- Displacement: 1,740 tons full; 1,400 tons, standard
- Length: 306 ft (93 m)
- Beam: 36 ft 9 in (11.20 m)
- Draft: 13 ft 6 in (4.11 m)
- Propulsion: GE turbo-electric drive, 12,000 hp (8.9 MW); two propellers
- Speed: 23 knots (43 km/h)
- Range: 4,940 nautical miles at 12 knots; (9,200 km at 22 km/h)
- Complement: 15 officers, 198 men
- Armament: 3 × 3 in (76 mm) DP guns, 3 × 21 in (53 cm) torpedo tubes, 1 × 1.1 in (28 mm) quad AA gun, 8 × 20 mm cannon, 1 × hedgehog projector, 2 × depth charge tracks, 8 × K-gun depth charge projectors

USS Runels (DE-793/APD-85) was a Buckley-class destroyer escort of the United States Navy, in service from 1944 to 1947. She was finally sold for scrap in 1961.

The ship was named for Donald Runels; he was a sailor killed aboard the heavy cruiser USS Northampton when she was sunk during the Battle of Tassafaronga on 30 November 1942.

== History ==
Runels was laid down on 7 June 1943 by the Consolidated Steel Corp., Orange, Texas; launched on 4 September 1943; sponsored by Mrs. D. S. Runels, widow of Ensign Runels; and commissioned on 3 January 1944.

=== Battle of the Atlantic ===
Runels, assigned to Escort Division 47 (CortDiv 47), completed shakedown off Bermuda in April. In March [sic] she joined Task Force 67 (TF 67), at Brooklyn, for transoceanic convoy duty. Between 25 March and 11 May, she escorted a convoy to the United Kingdom and back; then, toward the end of May, shifted to a more southerly route and convoyed ships to Casablanca. Returning in mid-June, she operated with escort carriers off the coast of southern New England until the 30th when she headed for North Africa again. On 10 July she arrived at Mers-el-Kebir; reported to Task Group 80.6 (TG 80.6); and commenced escort and patrol duty along the western North African coast. Within the week, however, her escort runs were extended to Naples where Allied forces were preparing for Operation Dragoon – the invasion of southern France.

On 13 August Runels cleared Naples with others assigned to convoy control of Operation "Dragoon" forces. On the 15th, she arrived in the assault area and took up station in the transport screen. For the next 2 months, however, she continued to escort troops and supplies, from Mers-el-Kebir and from Naples, into the offloading areas along the southern coast of France. Then, in November and December, she protected LSTs shuttling supplies between Bastia, Corsica, and Marseille.

=== Pacific War ===
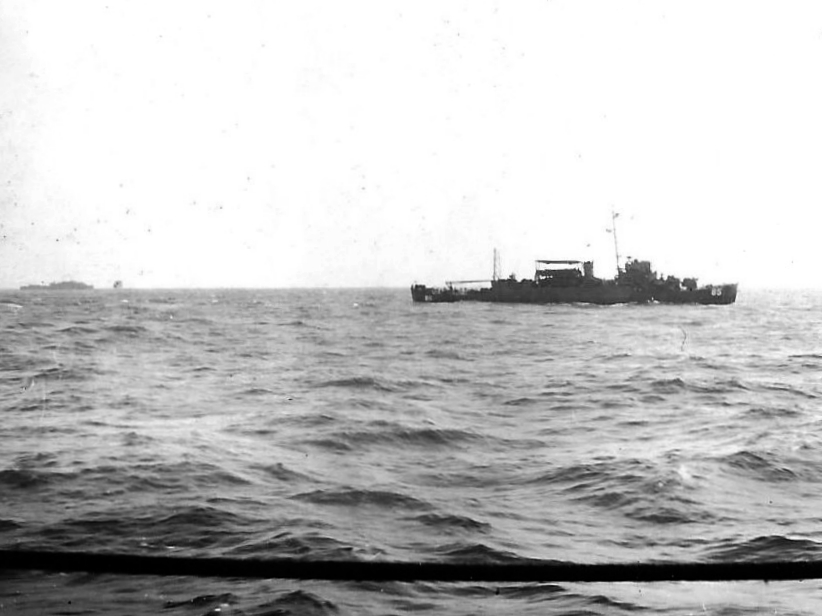
Runels off Japan on 28 August 1945

Ordered back to the United States for conversion to a destroyer transport, Runels departed the Mediterranean at the end of the year and arrived at New York on 18 January 1945. Redesignated APD-85 on 24 January, she completed conversion 8 April; conducted training in Chesapeake Bay; and departed for the Pacific on the 28th. In mid-May she arrived in Hawaii for further training and on 9 June cleared Pearl Harbor with an Eniwetok-bound convoy. From the Marshalls, Runels continued on to the Marianas, thence to Okinawa. Arriving on 4 July, she patrolled off the Hagushi Anchorage until the 13th; escorted Leyte–Okinawa convoys between 14 July and 6 August; then served as radar picket ship until the cessation of hostilities.

Detached 16 August, Runels operated briefly with the fast carrier replenishment group, then joined Task Force 31 (TF 31), and on the 27th anchored in Sagami Wan to begin 7 months of occupation duty. During September she assisted in the evacuation of Allied POWs from Japanese camps and provided mail, passenger and freight service between Iwo Jima and Tokyo. In October and November, she participated in the demilitarization of islands in the Izu group; and, in December, she served as mobile headquarters for the Director of Port Activities, Empire Area; and conducted an inspection trip to the Ryūkyūs. With the new year, 1946, Runels continued her varied duties in support of the occupation of Japan. On 9 April she sailed east for the United States and inactivation, arriving at Philadelphia Navy Yard on 31 May. In July she shifted to Charleston, S.C. and in January 1947, to Mayport, Fla. There she decommissioned on 10 February 1947 and was berthed as a unit of the Atlantic Reserve Fleet.

=== Fate ===
Runels remained in the Reserve Fleet until struck from the Navy list on 1 June 1960. She was sold for scrap to the Portsmouth Salvage Co., Portsmouth, Virginia on 10 July 1961.

Runels earned one battle star for World War II service.
