= Lanier County School District =

School district in Georgia (U.S. state)

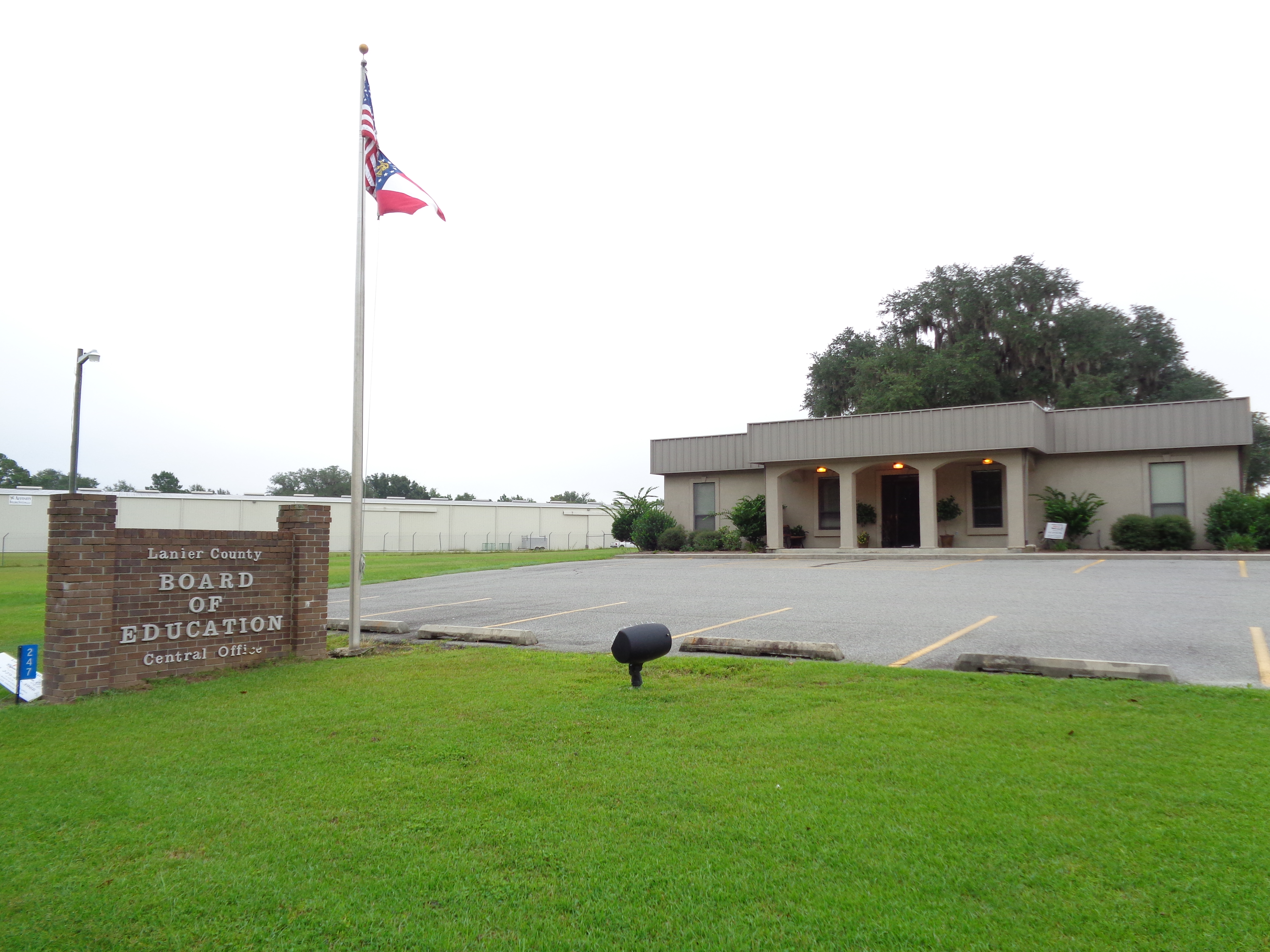

Address
- 247 South Highway 221 Lakeland, Georgia, 31635; United States
- Coordinates: 31.039642°N 83.074794°W

District information
- Grades: Pre-school - 12
- Superintendent: Gene Culpepper
- Accreditation(s): Southern Association of Colleges and Schools; Georgia Accrediting Commission

Students and staff
- Enrollment: 1,435
- Faculty: 94

Other information
- Telephone: (229) 482-3966
- Fax: (299) 482-3020
- Website: www.lanier.k12.ga.us

The Lanier County School District is a public school district in Lanier County, Georgia, United States, based in Lakeland. It, the county's sole school district, serves the communities of Lakeland and Stockton.

== Schools ==
The Lanier County School District has one primary school, one elementary school, one middle school, and one high school.

- Lanier County Elementary School
- Lanier County Middle School
- Lanier County High School
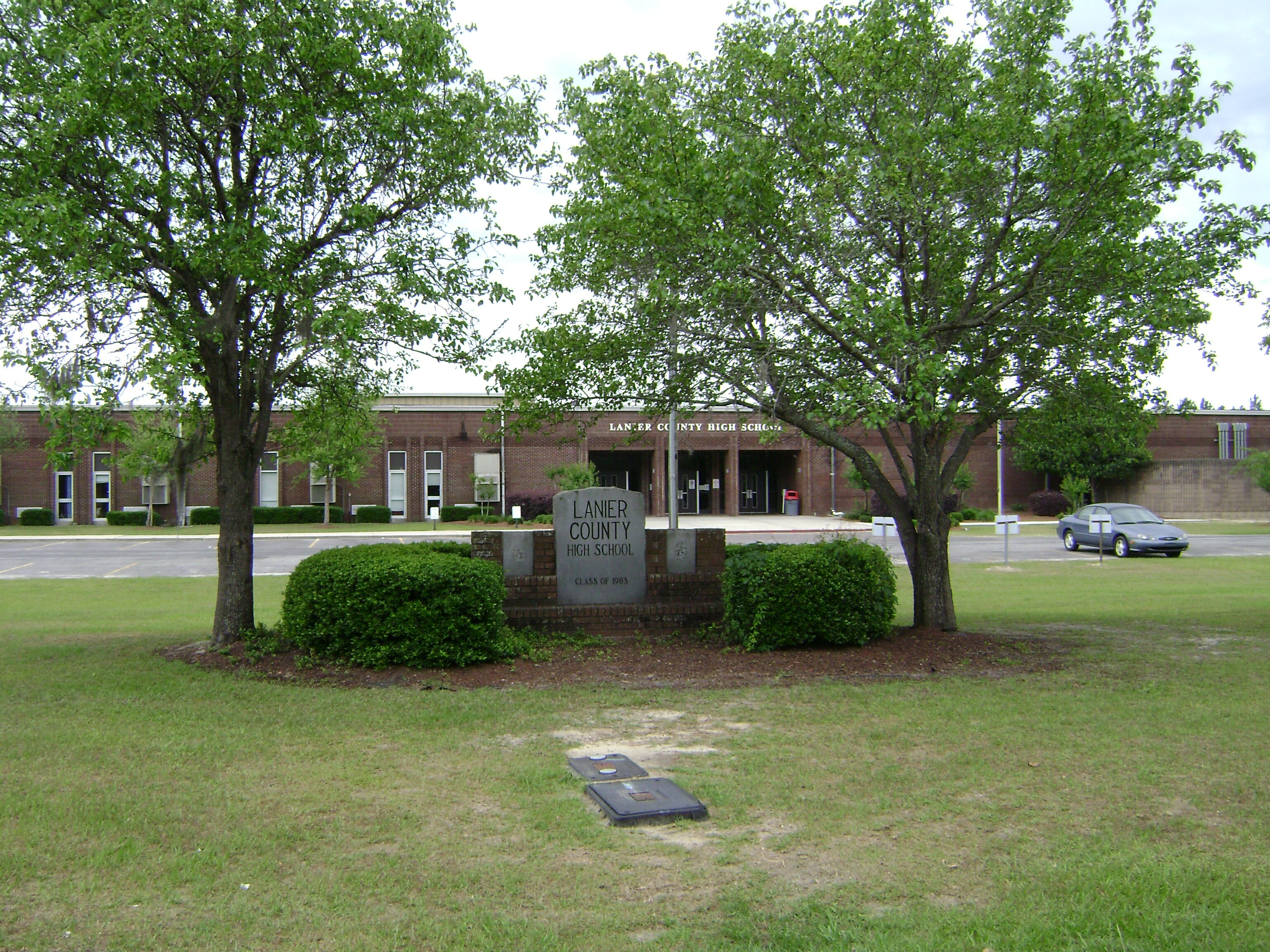
Lanier County High School

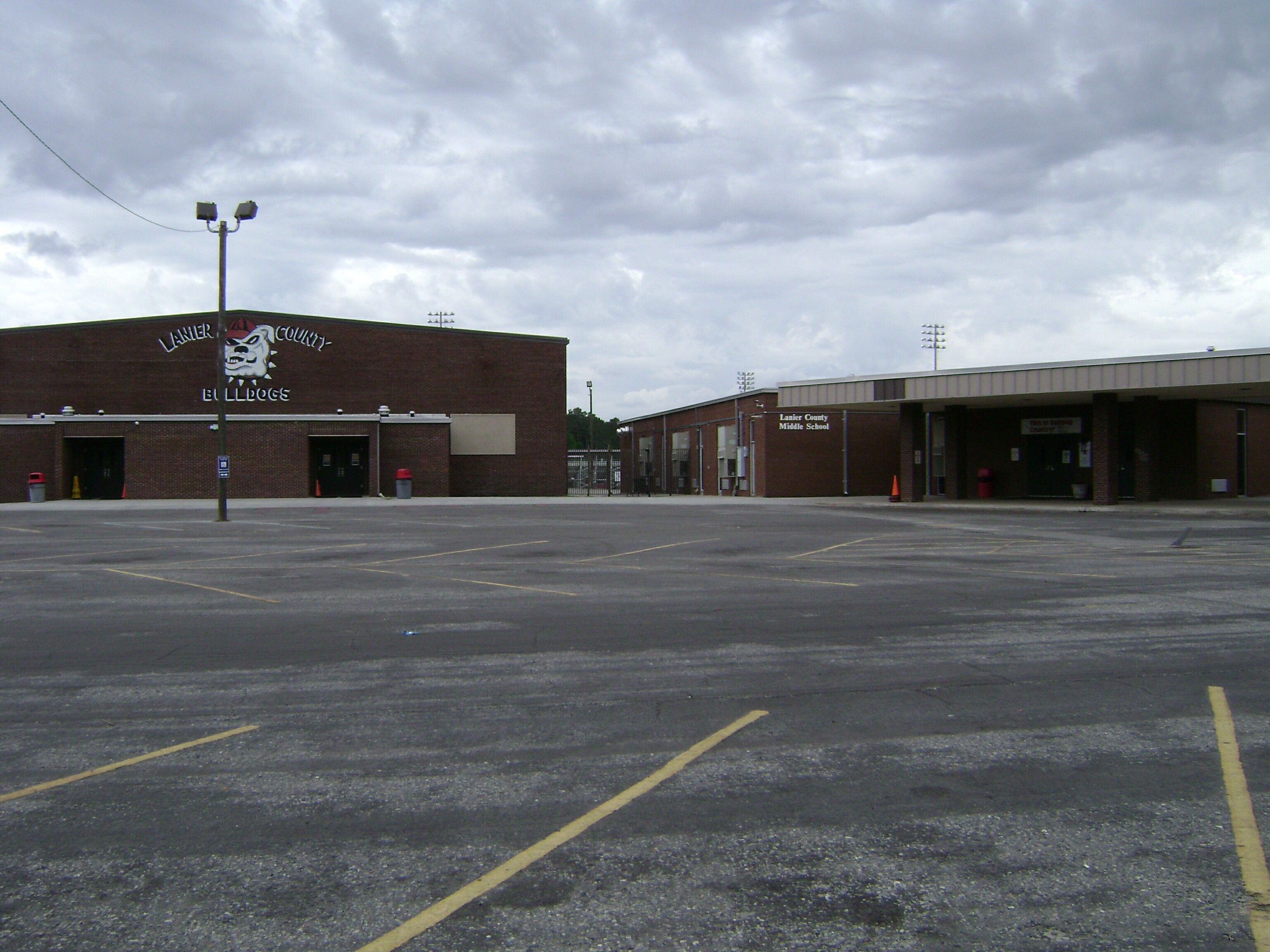
Lanier County Middle School

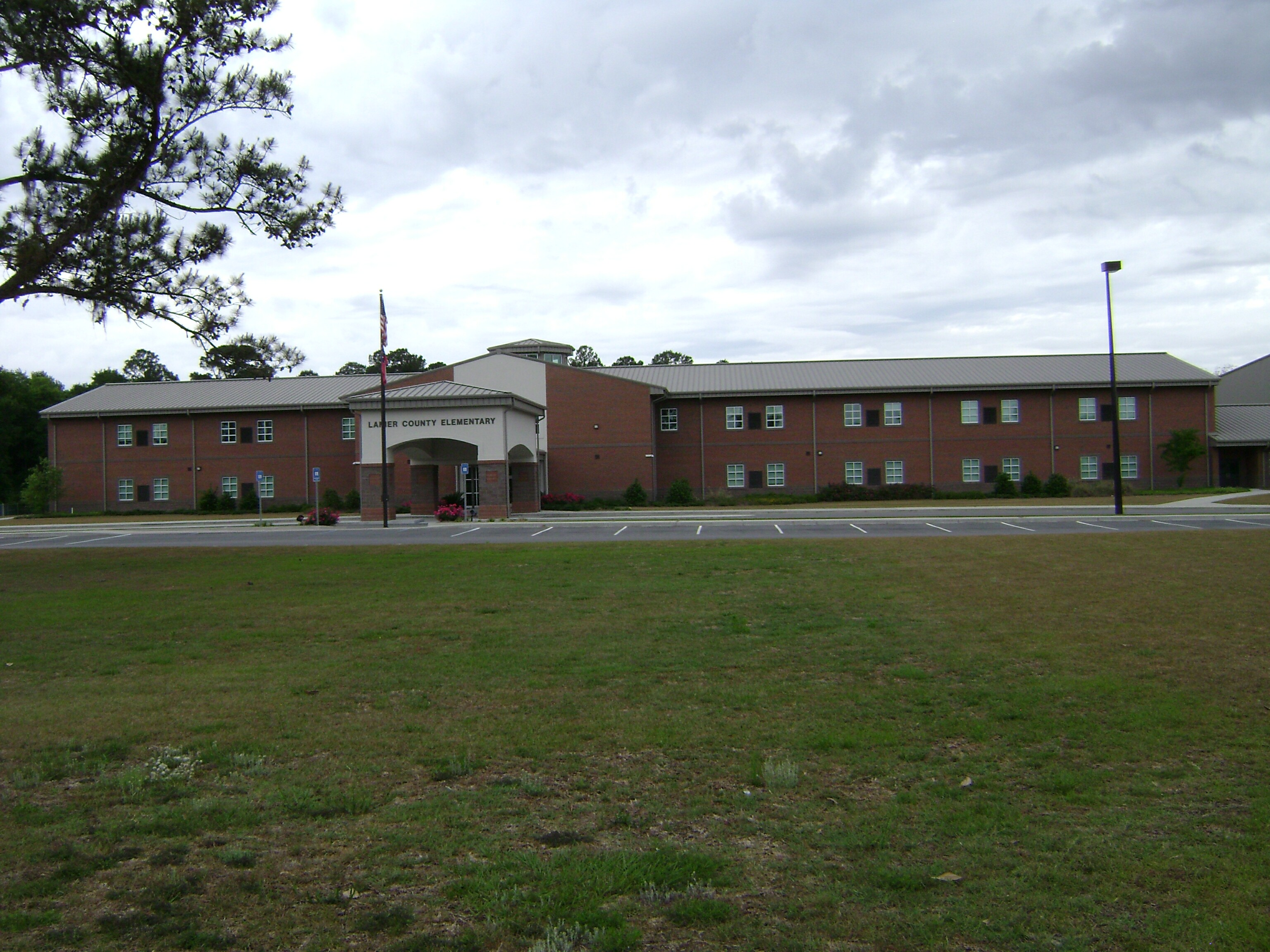
Lanier County Elementary School
