= Task Force 31 =

Task Force 31 (TF 31) was a US Navy task force active with the United States Third Fleet during World War II, and still ready to be activated today with today's Third Fleet. Task Force numbers were in constant use, and there were several incarnations of TF 31 during World War II.

In its most known World War II guise, it was formed at the end of World War II, under Rear Admiral Oscar C. Badger II, to begin the occupation of Japan. The TF 31 combatant ships were the first to enter Tokyo Bay when the US was not certain what kind of reception was waiting from the Japanese. The Task Force transported US Marine units to the Miura Peninsula area of Japan, which forms the southwest arm of Tokyo Bay, for occupation duties. The Marines were tasked with securing the military bases at Yokosuka and demilitarizing the entire peninsula.

== History ==
=== Background ===
Anticipating a possible Japanese surrender, plans were underway for the occupation of Japan. General MacArthur's Operation Blacklist was chosen over Admiral Nimitz's plan. Both commanders agreed that the prompt occupation of Japan was essential. Third Fleet, under Admiral Halsey, was the only unit deemed capable and ready to do this. "On 8 August, advance copies of Halsey's Operation Plan 10–45 for the occupation of Japan setting up Task Force 31 (TF 31), the Yokosuka Occupation Force, were distributed. The task force's mission, based on Nimitz's basic concept, was to clear the entrance to Tokyo Bay and anchorages, occupy and secure the Yokosuka Naval Base, seize and operate Yokosuka Airfield, support the release of Allied prisoners, demilitarize all enemy ships and defenses, and assist U.S. Army troops in preparing for the landing of additional forces. Three days later, Rear Admiral Badger, Commander, Battleship Division 7, was designated by Halsey to be commander, TF 31." The existing Task Force 38 was also alerted.

The 6th Marine Division, was tasked to provide a regiment for the land portion of the operation. The Fleet Landing Force was commanded by Brigadier General William T. Clement. The 4th Regiment was selected. The choice was symbolic as the Old 4th had been captured in the Philippines early in the war. The 4th, and additional support units, made up the 5,400 man Task Force Able.

=== Beginning ===
The elements of TF 31 began loading the Marines and their equipment on 1945-08-14. On the 18th, advance command elements of the task force on board the USS Ozark joined up with the USS Missouri in Task Force 38. The Task Force was officially created at 1400 on 1945-08-19 en route to Japan. Two landing plans were considered: landing at Zushi on the western side of the peninsula or at Zushi and Yokosuka on the Tokyo Bay side. It was decided not to risk entering the bay until the "threat of Japanese treachery" was dealt with. At sea, some 3,500 men were transferred between the ships to organize the assault units.

On 1945-08-21 plans were changed to land at Yokosuka, the primary objective. This would reduce the forces' exposure on two narrow roads from Zushi to Yokosuka. General MacArthur's choice of Zushi as his headquarters also was a factor in the decision. L-Day was originally scheduled for 1945-08-26, but was delayed to the 28th by a typhoon developing 300 miles to the southeast that was going to delay USAAF operations for 48 hours. L-Day was again delayed until 1945-08-30.

=== Occupation ===
On 1945-08-27, Japanese reported on board the Missouri and their pilots were sent on a destroyer to guide Task Force 31 into Yokosuka Bay. Minesweepers did a defensive sweep on the way in as the Japanese had not been able to sweep the approaches. That afternoon Task Force 31 anchored in Sagami Wan, just outside Tokyo Bay.

At 0900 on 1945-08-28, led by USS San Diego, the combat elements of Task Force 31 entered Tokyo Bay and by 1300 they were anchored in Yokosuka Bay. Vice Admiral Michitaro Tozuka reported on board the San Diego for instructions on securing and surrendering the Yokosuka base. Around that time, an advance party from the USAAF landed at Atsugi Airfield to prepare it for the L-Day landing of the 11th Airborne Division.

On 1945-08-29, Admiral Halsey arrived in Sagami Wan. Two POWs rescued earlier from the beach convinced him to start the POW rescue operations that day.

"That evening, for the first time since Pearl Harbor, the ships of the Third Fleet were illuminated. As General Metzger later remembered: 'Word was passed to illuminate ship, but owing to the long wartime habit of always darkening ship at night, no ship would take the initiative in turning their lights on. Finally, after the order had been repeated a couple of times lights went on. It was a wonderful picture with all the ships flying large battle flags both at the foretruck and the stern. In the background was snowcapped Mount Fuji.' Movies were shown on the weather decks. While the apprehension of some lessened, lookouts were still posted, radars continued to search, and the ships remained on alert."

Before dawn on L-Day, 1945-08-30, three groups of transports and escorts from TF 31 left Sagami Wan for Tokyo Bay. At 0558, Marines landed on Fattsu Saki to secure the forts guarding Tokyo Bay, in coordination with the planned 0600 arrival of planes carrying the 11th Airborne at Atsugi Airfield. Finding the Japanese had followed the instructions on disabling their guns to the letter, the Marines quickly secured the forts and rejoined the task force at 0845. At 0805 a small crew from USS South Dakota boarded the Japanese battleship Nagato and received its surrender from a skeleton crew. 0930 on L-Day saw the Marines of 1st and 3rd Battalion landing at Yokosuka. The Japanese at the Yokosuka base had complied completely by disabling their weapons and removing all non-essential personnel. At 1030 the San Diego docked at Yokosuka. The formal surrender of the Japanese First Naval District by Admiral Tozuka to Rear Admiral Robert Carney, acting for Admiral Halsey, and Rear Admiral Badger took place at 1045.

=== Dissolution ===
After the delivery of the Marine occupation forces, TF 31 transport assets departed on 1 September to transport additional occupation troops. After the formal surrender of Japan on 1945-09-02, Task Force 31 had completed its mission. By 6 September all Navy personnel and ships' Marine detachments had returned to their ships from shore duties. On 1945-09-08, Admiral Badger's Task Force 31 was dissolved.

== Ships of Task Force 31 ==
- USS San Diego (CL-53) (Task Force Flagship)
- USS Iowa (BB-61)
- USS Wedderburn (DD-684)
- USS Twining (DD-540)
- USS Stockham (DD-683)
- USS Southerland (DD-743) ?
- TG 31.5
  - USS Yarnall (DD-541)
  - USS Halsey Powell (DD-686)
- TG 31.2 – Minesweeping Group
  - USS Thomas E. Fraser (DM-24)
  - USS Gwin (DM-33)
  - USS Ellyson (DMS-19)
  - USS Gherardi (DMS-30)
  - USS Hambleton (DMS-20)
  - USS Fitch (DMS-25)
  - USS Hopkins (DMS-13)
  - USS Jeffers (DMS-27)
  - USS Macomb (DMS-23)
  - USS Revenge (AM-110)
  - USS Token (AM-126)
  - USS Tumult (AM-127)
  - USS Pochard (AM-375)
  - USS Picket (ACM-8)
  - YMS: YMS-177(probably), YMS-268, YMS-276, YMS-343, YMS-362, YMS-390, YMS-415, YMS-426, YMS-441, YMS-461, YMS-467
  - PGM-32, PGM-??
- USS Runels (APD-85)
- USS Ozark (LSV-2)
- USS Garrard (APA-84)
- Former TU 12.1.2
  - "Trio of Destroyers"
  - USS Braxton (APA-138)
  - USS Grimes (APA-172)
  - USS Lanier (APA-125)
  - USS Meriwether (APA-203)
  - USS Mellette (APA-156)
  - USS Waukesha (AKA-84)

== See also ==
United States Fleet Activities Yokosuka
