= Lelia Lake, Texas =

- Unincorporated community
- Location within the state of Texas Lelia; Lake (the United States)
- Coordinates: 34°54′05″N 100°46′11″W
- Country: United States
- State: Texas
- County: Donley

Area
  - Total: 0.89 sq mi (2.31 km^{2})
  - Land: 0.89 sq mi (2.30 km^{2})
  - Water: 0.0039 sq mi (0.01 km^{2})
- Elevation: 2,585 ft (788 m)
- Time zone: UTC-6 (Central (CST))
  - Summer (DST): UTC-5 (CDT)
- ZIP codes: 79240
- GNIS feature ID: 2805772

Lelia Lake is an unincorporated community in central Donley County, Texas, United States. As of the 2020 census, Lelia Lake had a population of 51. It lies along U.S. Route 287, southeast of the city of Clarendon, the county seat of Donley County. Although Lelia Lake is unincorporated, it has a post office, with the ZIP code of 79240.

Founded along the Fort Worth and Denver City Railway in the late 1880s, the community was named for the founder's sister. When a post office was opened in the community in late 1906, the potential of confusion with the community of Lela in Wheeler County to the northeast led the post office to attach "Lake" to the community's name. A school was established in the community in 1894. Historically, Lelia Lake has been a center of grain traffic and of watermelon growing.

== Demographics ==
Historical population
Census	Pop.	Note	%±
2020	51		—
U.S. Decennial Census; 1850–1900 1910; 1920 1930 1940; 1950 1960 1970; 1980 1990 2000; 2010 2020

Lelia Lake first appeared as a census designated place in the 2020 U.S. census.

=== 2020 Census ===
Lelia Lake CDP, Texas – Racial and ethnic composition Note: the US Census treats Hispanic/Latino as an ethnic category. This table excludes Latinos from the racial categories and assigns them to a separate category. Hispanics/Latinos may be of any race.
Race / Ethnicity (NH = Non-Hispanic)	Pop 2020	% 2020
White alone (NH)	40	78.43%
Black or African American alone (NH)	0	0.00%
Native American or Alaska Native alone (NH)	0	0.00%
Asian alone (NH)	0	0.00%
Native Hawaiian or Pacific Islander alone (NH)	0	0.00%
Other race alone (NH)	0	0.00%
Mixed race or Multiracial (NH)	1	1.96%
Hispanic or Latino (any race)	10	19.61%
Total	51	100.00%

== Notable person ==
- Ace Reid, artist and humorist
