= Lanier County High School =

Public high school in Lakeland, Georgia, United States

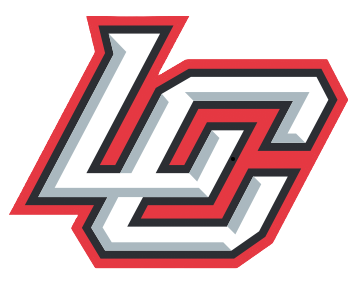

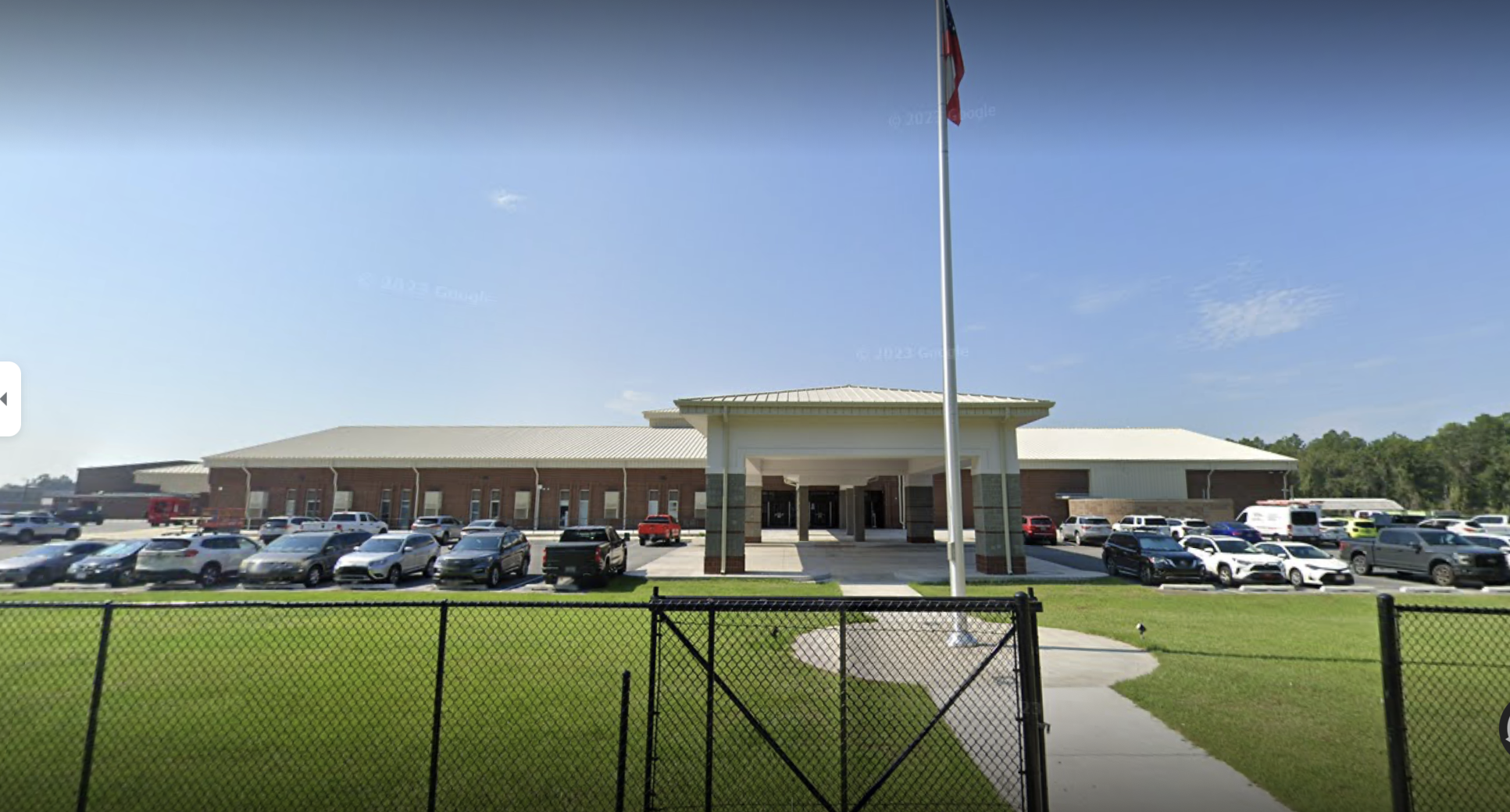

Location
- 52 West Patten Avenue; Lakeland, Georgia 31635-6839; United States
- Coordinates: 31.037650°N 83.076987°W

Information
- Type: Public high school
- School district: Lanier County School District
- Principal: Matthew Weaver
- Teaching staff: 32.50 FTE
- Grades: 9-12
- Enrollment: 473 (2023-2024)
- Student to teacher ratio: 14.55
- Hours in school day: 7:30 am - 2:50 pm
- Color
- Athletics conference: GHSA Class A Region 2
- Mascot: Bulldog
- Team name: Lanier County Bulldogs
- Website: https://lchs.lanier.k12.ga.us/

Lanier County High School is a public secondary school in Lakeland, Georgia. It is the only high school in the Lanier County School District and serves students in grades nine through twelve. As of the 2023–24 school year, its enrollment is approximately 473 students. The school’s feeder institution is Lanier County Middle School.

== History ==
Lanier County was established on August 7, 1920 and Lanier County High School was likely established around the same time.

== Academics and student body ==
The academic programs section includes Advanced Placement (AP) courses, career and technical education (CTE) pathways, and special education instructional services.

The school’s demographics include approximately 52.6% White, 31.3% Black, 10.8% Hispanic or Latino, 1.3% Asian or Pacific Islander, and 4.0% two or more races.

As measured by the academic proficiency tests, 35% of the students are proficient in Mathematics, 51% in English, and 47% in Science. The school graduation rate is 92%.

== Athletics ==
Lanier County High School's athletic teams are known as the Bulldogs. The school competes in the Georgia High School Association (GHSA).

Lanier County High School has won state championships in the following sports:

- Baseball (2024, 2025)
- Softball (2023, 2025)
- Track and field (1966, 1993)
- Boys' basketball (1955)
