= Lanier County, Georgia =

County in Georgia, United States

- County
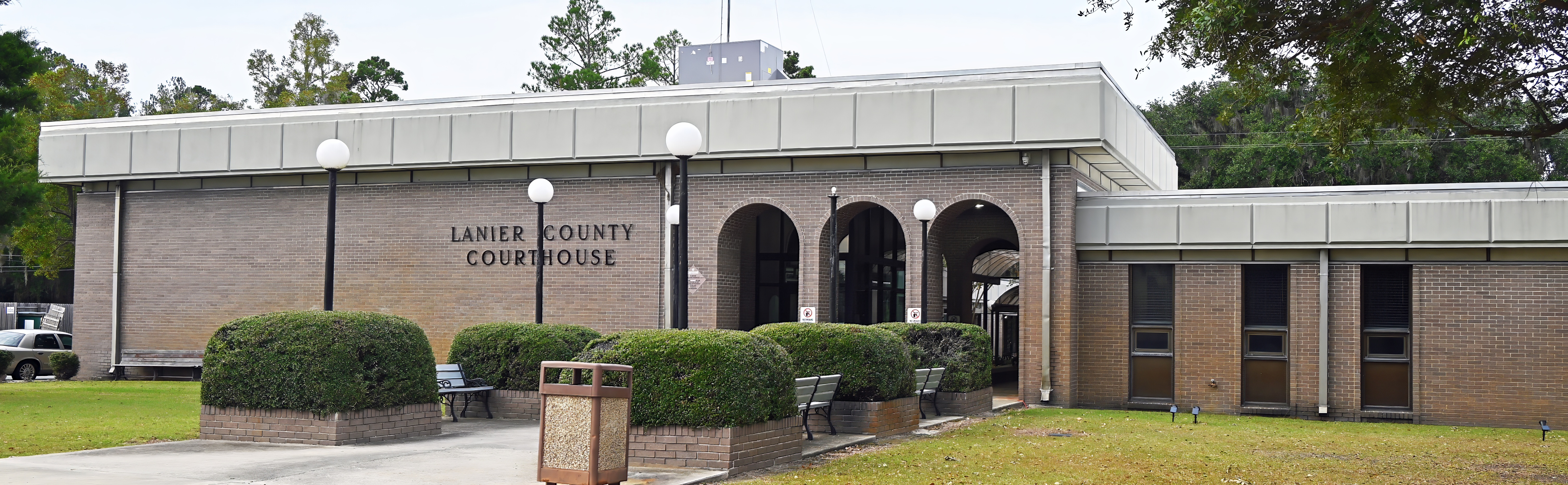
- Lanier County Courthouse in Lakeland

- Location within the U.S. state of Georgia
- Coordinates: 31°02′16″N 83°03′46″W
- Country: United States
- State: Georgia
- Founded: August 7, 1920
- Named for: Sidney Lanier
- Seat: Lakeland
- Largest city: Lakeland

Area
  - Total: 200 sq mi (520 km^{2})
  - Land: 185 sq mi (480 km^{2})
  - Water: 15 sq mi (39 km^{2}) 7.3%

Population (2020)
  - Total: 9,877
  - Estimate (2025): 10,623 ▲
  - Density: 53/sq mi (20/km^{2})
- Time zone: UTC−5 (Eastern)
  - Summer (DST): UTC−4 (EDT)
- Congressional district: 8th
- Website: laniercountyboc.com

Lanier County is a county in the south central portion of the U.S. state of Georgia. At the 2020 census, the population was 9,877. The county seat is Lakeland. It is named after Georgia poet Sidney Lanier.

Lanier County is part of the Valdosta metropolitan area and shares Moody Air Force Base with Lowndes County on its western boundary.

== Geography ==
According to the U.S. Census Bureau, the county has an area of 200 square miles (520 km^{2}), of which 185 square miles (480 km^{2}) is land and 15 square miles (39 km^{2}) (7.3%) is water.

The vast majority of Lanier County is in the Alapaha River sub-basin of the Suwannee River basin. Just a narrow section of the western border of the county, northeast and southeast of Ray City, is in the Withlacoochee River sub-basin of the same Suwannee River basin, and a very narrow section of the eastern border of Lanier County is in the Upper Suwannee River sub-basin of the same Suwannee River basin.

=== Major highways ===
- U.S. Route 84 / State Route 38
- U.S. Route 129 / State Route 11
  - State Route 11 Bypass
  - State Route 11 Connector
- U.S. Route 221 / State Route 31
  - State Route 31 Connector
- State Route 37
- State Route 64
- State Route 122
  - State Route 122 Connector
- State Route 125
- State Route 135
  - State Route 135 Bypass
- State Route 168

=== Major waterways ===
- Alapaha River
- Banks Lake

=== Railways ===
==== Previous ====
- CSX Transportation

==== Defunct ====
- Atlantic and Gulf Railroad
- Atlantic Coast Line Railroad
- Lakeland Railroad (Defunct, it was used from 1929 to 1957. It ran along the same path as the Milltown Air Line Railroad)
- Milltown Air Line Railroad (Defunct, it was used from 1904 to 1928. It ran from Lakeland to Naylor, Georgia)
- Plant System
- Waycross and Western Railroad (Defunct, it was used from 1912 to 1925 from Waycross, Georgia to Lakeland, Georgia. It roughly followed current Georgia State Route 122)

=== Adjacent counties ===
- Berrien County - northwest
- Atkinson County - north
- Clinch County - east
- Echols County - south
- Lowndes County - southwest

=== National protected area ===
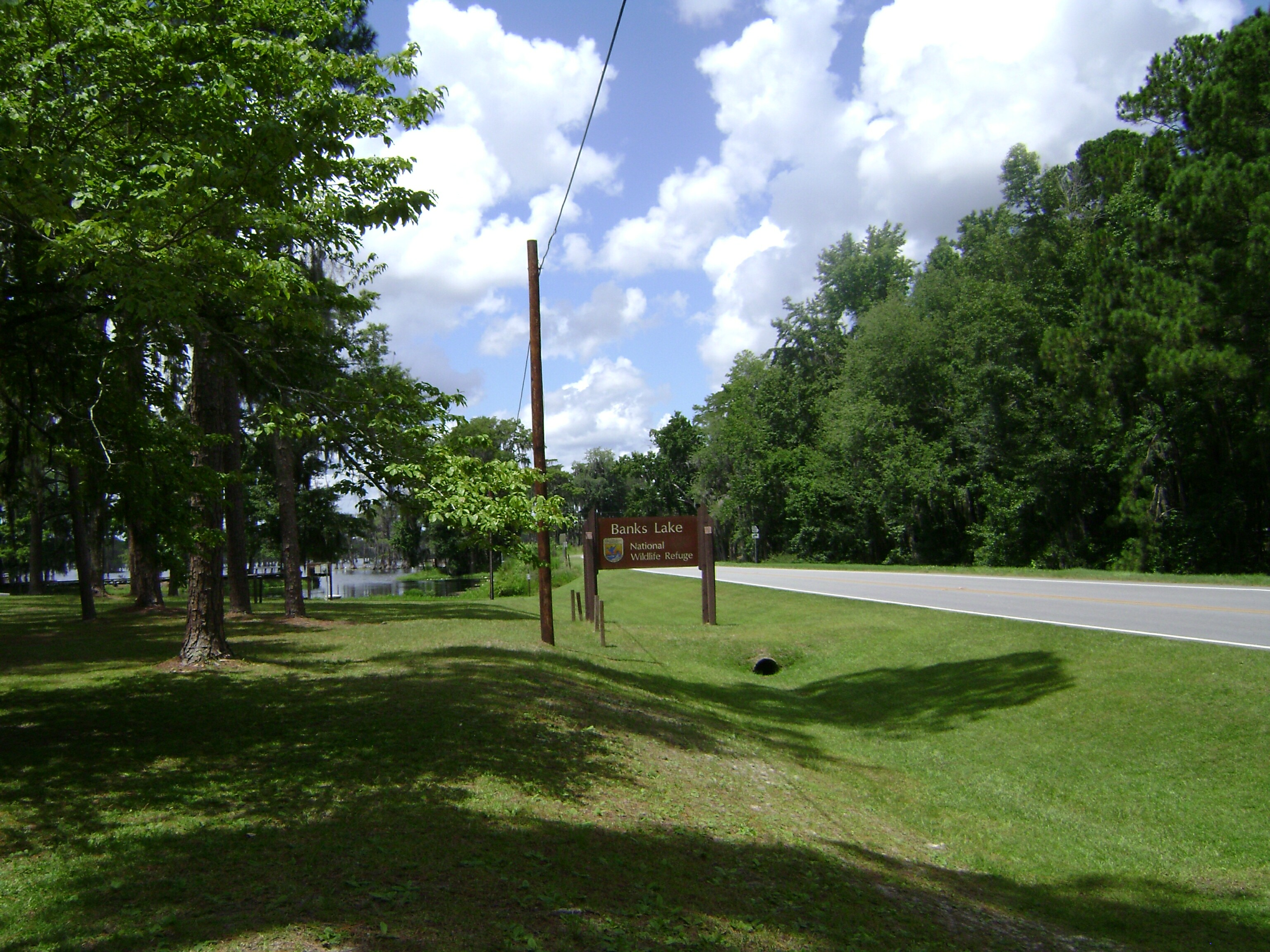
Banks Lake National Wildlife Refuge sign

The Banks Lake National Wildlife Refuge, established in 1985, hosts approximately 20,000 visitors annually. It provides hiking, fishing, and boating opportunities on more than 4,000 acres (16 km^{2}) of water, Banks Lake marsh, and swamp. The Robert Simpson III Nature Trail, dedicated in August 2001, is in the Lakeland, Georgia city limits on 75 acres (300,000 m^{2}) of pine and hardwood forests. The county is known for its excellent fishing in the Alapaha River, Banks Lake National Wildlife Refuge as well as in its many small lakes.

=== Communities ===
==== Cities ====
- Lakeland
- Ray City

==== Census-designated place ====
- Stockton

== Demographics ==
Historical population
Census	Pop.	Note	%±
1930	5,190		—
1940	5,632		8.5%
1950	5,151		−8.5%
1960	5,097		−1.0%
1970	5,031		−1.3%
1980	5,654		12.4%
1990	5,531		−2.2%
2000	7,241		30.9%
2010	10,078		39.2%
2020	9,877		−2.0%
2025 (est.)	10,623	▲	7.6%
U.S. Decennial Census; 1790-1880 1890-1910; 1920-1930 1930-1940; 1940-1950 1960-1980; 1980-2000 2010

=== Racial and ethnic composition ===
Lanier County, Georgia – Racial and ethnic composition Note: the US Census treats Hispanic/Latino as an ethnic category. This table excludes Latinos from the racial categories and assigns them to a separate category. Hispanics/Latinos may be of any race.
Race / Ethnicity (NH = Non-Hispanic)	Pop 1980	Pop 1990	Pop 2000	Pop 2010	Pop 2020	% 1980	% 1990	% 2000	% 2010	% 2020
White alone (NH)	4,223	3,957	5,122	6,899	6,595	74.69%	71.54%	70.74%	68.46%	66.77%
Black or African American alone (NH)	1,378	1,455	1,845	2,367	2,138	24.37%	26.31%	25.48%	23.49%	21.65%
Native American or Alaska Native alone (NH)	13	36	35	38	31	0.23%	0.65%	0.48%	0.38%	0.31%
Asian alone (NH)	6	15	26	101	81	0.11%	0.27%	0.36%	1.00%	0.82%
Native Hawaiian or Pacific Islander alone (NH)	x	x	3	3	14	x	x	0.04%	0.03%	0.14%
Other race alone (NH)	0	0	6	4	33	0.00%	0.00%	0.08%	0.04%	0.33%
Mixed race or Multiracial (NH)	x	x	78	205	413	x	x	1.08%	2.03%	4.18%
Hispanic or Latino (any race)	34	68	126	461	572	0.60%	1.23%	1.74%	4.57%	5.79%
Total	5,654	5,531	7,241	10,078	9,877	100.00%	100.00%	100.00%	100.00%	100.00%

=== 2020 census ===
As of the 2020 census, there were 9,877 people, 3,570 households, and 2,536 families residing in the county. The median age was 35.1 years, 25.8% of residents were under the age of 18, and 13.8% of residents were 65 years of age or older.

For every 100 females there were 100.5 males, and for every 100 females age 18 and over there were 99.5 males age 18 and over. 0.0% of residents lived in urban areas, while 100.0% lived in rural areas.

The racial makeup of the county was 66.77% White (non-Hispanic), 21.65% Black or African American (non-Hispanic), 0.31% Native American, 0.82% Asian, 0.14% Pacific Islander, 4.52% Other/Mixed, and 5.79% Hispanic or Latino residents of any race.

There were 3,570 households in the county, of which 36.6% had children under the age of 18 living with them and 26.6% had a female householder with no spouse or partner present. About 24.9% of all households were made up of individuals and 9.1% had someone living alone who was 65 years of age or older.

There were 4,069 housing units, of which 12.3% were vacant. Among occupied housing units, 64.9% were owner-occupied and 35.1% were renter-occupied. The homeowner vacancy rate was 1.1% and the rental vacancy rate was 5.4%.

== Economy ==
The county's economy has remained rural in nature, but the educational, health and social service sector was the largest employment category in 2006. Factors contributing to this economy include the presence of Moody Air Force Base (shared by adjoining Lowndes County), the several lakes and nature reserve, the hospital, and a large state correctional facility.

The top ten employers in Lanier County are:

- Moody Air Force Base
- Farmers & Merchants Bank
- Louis Smith Hospital
- Patten Probation Detention Center
- Georgia Department of Corrections
- Patten Seed Company
- City of Lakeland, Georgia
- Wausau Homes, Inc
- J.H. Harvey Co, LLC (parent company of Harveys Supermarkets)

== Media ==
- Lanier County News - Legal organ and hometown newspaper since 1913. The paper was originally named The Milltown Advocate, but changed its name after Lanier County was formed in 1920.
- Lanier County Advocate (newspaper) - Legal organ newspaper as of January 1, 2015.

== Historic sites ==
Historic sites include Governor Eurith D. Rivers' home, which was moved from its original spot on Banks Lake to West Main Street in Lakeland in the early 1980s; Union Baptist Church, located near Georgia Highway 135; and Fender Cemetery, located east of Lakeland at the junction of U.S. 221 and Georgia Highway 37 on land that once belonged to David Fender. The site of the cemetery, in which many of the area's first settlers are buried, was chosen so that mourners would not have to ferry their dead across the river for burial. Also, the "Murals of Milltown," which depict community life in the 1920s, grace the exteriors of buildings in downtown Lakeland.

== Education ==
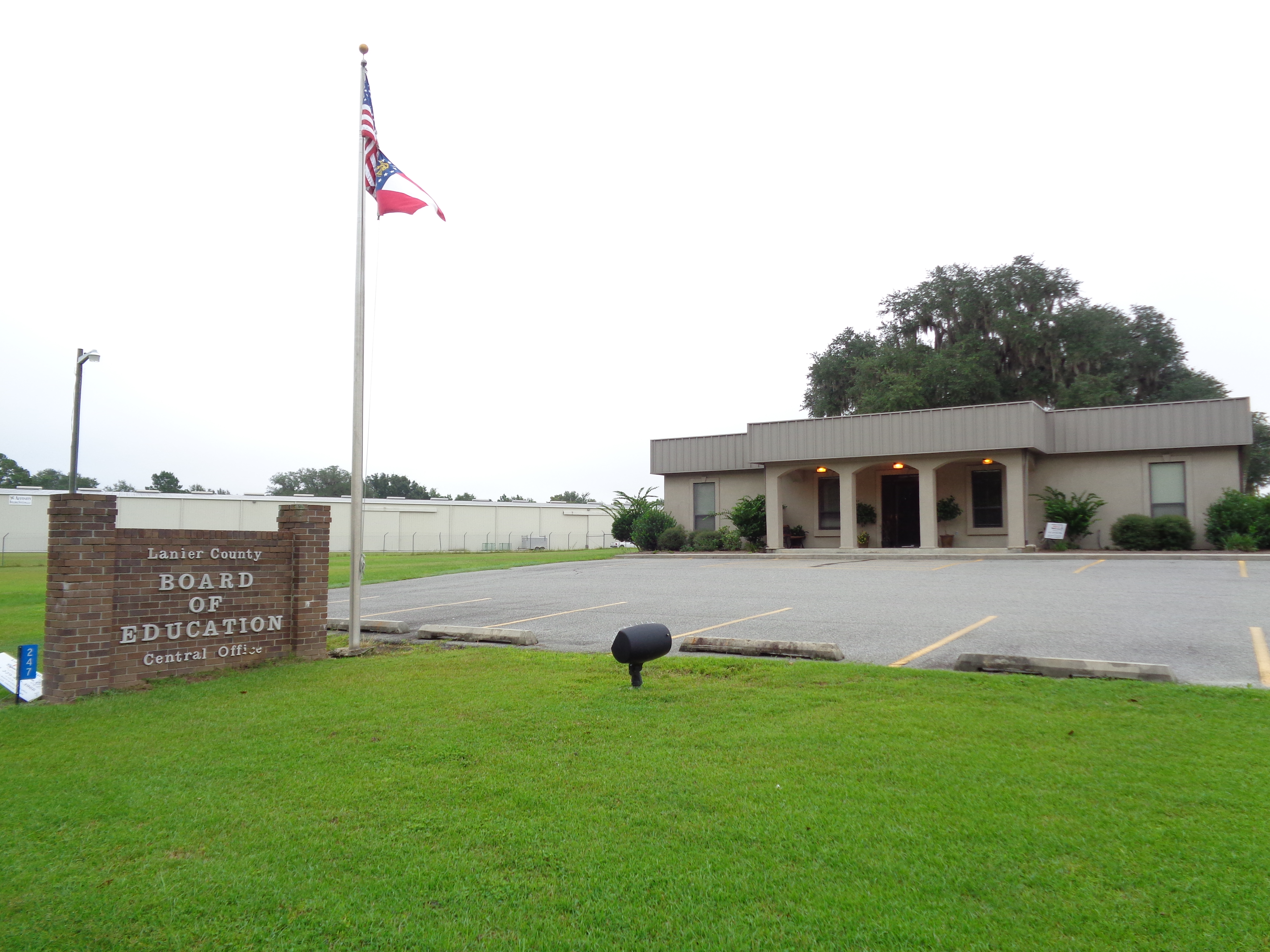
Lanier County School District headquarters

The Lanier County School District, the only school district in the county, operates four schools: Lanier County Primary School, Lanier County Elementary School, Lanier County Middle School, and Lanier County High School.

== Politics ==
United States presidential election results for Lanier County, Georgia
Year	Republican		Democratic		Third party(ies)	
Year	No.	%	No.	%	No.	%
1924	46	11.41%	356	88.34%	1	0.25%
1928	138	31.29%	303	68.71%	0	0.00%
1932	3	1.38%	211	97.24%	3	1.38%
1936	30	3.59%	800	95.81%	5	0.60%
1940	16	2.56%	607	97.12%	2	0.32%
1944	40	6.02%	625	93.98%	0	0.00%
1948	92	13.53%	486	71.47%	102	15.00%
1952	170	16.75%	845	83.25%	0	0.00%
1956	152	14.59%	890	85.41%	0	0.00%
1960	198	15.88%	1,049	84.12%	0	0.00%
1964	719	52.10%	661	47.90%	0	0.00%
1968	241	15.63%	277	17.96%	1,024	66.41%
1972	850	81.50%	193	18.50%	0	0.00%
1976	207	14.02%	1,269	85.98%	0	0.00%
1980	470	29.30%	1,116	69.58%	18	1.12%
1984	852	53.48%	741	46.52%	0	0.00%
1988	725	50.81%	698	48.91%	4	0.28%
1992	600	35.03%	811	47.34%	302	17.63%
1996	519	34.55%	818	54.46%	165	10.99%
2000	1,048	55.04%	832	43.70%	24	1.26%
2004	1,641	63.38%	931	35.96%	17	0.66%
2008	1,787	62.05%	1,062	36.88%	31	1.08%
2012	1,820	61.11%	1,114	37.41%	44	1.48%
2016	1,984	69.10%	806	28.07%	81	2.82%
2020	2,509	70.16%	1,019	28.50%	48	1.34%
2024	2,726	72.97%	995	26.63%	15	0.40%

United States Senate election results for Lanier County, Georgia2
Year	Republican		Democratic		Third party(ies)	
Year	No.	%	No.	%	No.	%
2020	2,481	70.50%	944	26.83%	94	2.67%
2020	2,127	70.15%	905	29.85%	0	0.00%

United States Senate election results for Lanier County, Georgia3
Year	Republican		Democratic		Third party(ies)	
Year	No.	%	No.	%	No.	%
2020	1,191	34.70%	365	10.64%	1,876	54.66%
2020	2,126	70.03%	910	29.97%	0	0.00%
2022	1,860	70.91%	725	27.64%	38	1.45%
2022	1,752	71.42%	701	28.58%	0	0.00%

Georgia Gubernatorial election results for Lanier County
Year	Republican		Democratic		Third party(ies)	
Year	No.	%	No.	%	No.	%
2022	1,932	73.24%	691	26.19%	15	0.57%

As of the 2020s, Lanier County is a Republican stronghold, voting 73% for Donald Trump in 2024. For elections to the United States House of Representatives, Lanier County is part of Georgia's 8th congressional district, currently represented by Austin Scott. For elections to the Georgia State Senate, Lanier County is part of District 8. For elections to the Georgia House of Representatives, Lanier County is part of District 176.

== See also ==
- National Register of Historic Places listings in Lanier County, Georgia
- List of counties in Georgia
