= Ace Reid =

American cartoonist

Asa Elmer "Ace" Reid, Jr., (March 10, 1925 – November 10, 1991) was the American creator of the cartoon Cowpokes and a Western humorist. Cowpokes, at one time, ran in over 400 weekly newspapers across the United States. He produced many popular cartoon books and calendars during his lifetime.

He was born on March 10, 1925, at Lelia Lake, Texas (near Amarillo). He was the son of Asa E. Reid, Sr., and Callie Miles Bishop. Shortly after his birth, the family moved to Electra, Texas, where he grew up ranching and cowboying.

During World War II, he served as a machinist's mate in the U.S. Navy in the Pacific aboard the USS Lanier . Cowpokes was born on board the Lanier; "The Sorry Salt" was a cartoon he drew for the ship's newspaper. After the war, "The Sorry Salt" became "Jake", his primary character.

On September 11, 1949, in Dallas, he married Madge Parmley, daughter of the doctor in Electra, T. H. Parmley. They moved to Kerrville, Texas, in 1952. Ace’s first cartoon appeared in West Texas Livestock Weekly that same year. Two years later, their son and only child, Stan, was born.

Reid appeared in the early gatherings of the American Cowboy Culture Association, which holds the annual National Cowboy Symposium and Celebration each September in Lubbock, Texas.

Ace and Madge were living in Kerrville at the time of his death on November 10, 1991. Madge still lives in Kerrville and has kept Cowpokes going since Ace's death.

== Published works ==
- Cowpokes, Cow Country Cartoons (1958), foreword by S. Omar Barker
- More Cowpokes (1960)
- Cowpokes Wanted (1961), introduction by Fred Gipson
- "Them Cowpokes" (1962)
- Draggin' S Ranch Cowpokes (1964)
- Cowpokes, Comin' Yore Way (1966)
- Cowpokes, Cookbook and Cartoons (1969)
- Cowpokes, Home Remedies (1971)
- Cowpokes Ride Again (1974)
- Cowpokes, Rarin' to Go (1978)
- ’’Cowpokes, Tales & Cartoons’’ (1981), foreword by Slim Pickens
- Cowpokes, Ole Jake (1987)
- On the Hunt (1992), foreword by Charles Schreiner III, of the Y.O. Ranch
- Cowpokes, Cartoons Recollections Exaggerations (1995)
- ’’Cowpokes, Breakin’ Out’’ (2004)
