= List of public library systems in Georgia =

This is a list of all public library systems in Georgia, United States, serviced under the Georgia Public Library Service. Georgia has 60 library systems consisting of 408 branches serving its 159 counties. Out of these, 284 libraries are serviced by the state-wide library system PINES.

Library	Website	Catalog
Athens Regional Library System	athenslibrary.org	PINES
Augusta-Richmond County Public Library System	arcpls.org	PINES
Azalea Regional Library System	azalealibraries.org	PINES
Bartow County Library System	bartowlibrary.org	BCLS
Bartram Trail Regional Library System	btrl.net	PINES
Brooks County Public Library	brooks.public.lib.ga.us	PINES
Catoosa County Library	catoosacountylibrary.org	PINES
Chattahoochee Valley Libraries	cvlga.org	CVL
Cherokee Regional Library System	chrl.org	PINES
Chestatee Regional Library System	chestateelibrary.org	PINES
Clayton County Library System	claytonpl.org	PINES
Coastal Plain Regional Library System	cprl.org	PINES
Cobb County Public Library System	cobbcat.org	CCPLS
Conyers-Rockdale Library System	conyersrockdalelibrary.org	PINES
Coweta Public Library System	cowt.ent.sirsi.net	CPLS
De Soto Trail Regional Library System	desototrail.org	PINES
DeKalb County Public Library	dekalblibrary.org	DCPL
Dougherty County Public Library	docolib.org	PINES
Elbert County Public Library	elbertlibrary.org	PINES
Flint River Regional Library System	frrls.net	PINES
Forsyth County Public Library	forsythpl.org	FCPL
Fulton County Library System	fulcolibrary.org	FCLS
Greater Clarks Hill Regional Library System	gchrl.org	PINES
Gwinnett County Public Library	gwinnettpl.org	GCPL
Hall County Library System	hallcountylibrary.org	PINES
Hart County Library	hartcountylibrary.com	PINES
Henry County Library System	henrylibraries.org	PINES
Houston County Public Library System	houpl.org	PINES
Jefferson County Library System	jefferson.public.lib.ga.us	PINES
Kinchafoonee Regional Library System	krlibrary.org	PINES
Lake Blackshear Regional Library System	lbrls.org	PINES
Lee County Library	leecountylibrary.org	PINES
Live Oak Public Libraries	liveoakpl.org	PINES
Marshes of Glynn Libraries	moglibraries.org	PINES
Middle Georgia Regional Library System	bibblib.org	PINES
Moultrie-Colquitt County Library System	mccls.org	PINES
Mountain Regional Library System	mountainregionallibrary.org	PINES
Newton County Library System	newtonlibraries.org	PINES
Northeast Georgia Regional Library System	negeorgialibraries.org	PINES
Northwest Georgia Regional Library System	ngrl.org	PINES
Ocmulgee Regional Library System	orls.org	PINES
Oconee Regional Library System	ocrl.org	PINES
Ohoopee Regional Library System	ohoopeelibrary.org	PINES
Okefenokee Regional Library System	okrls.org	PINES
Peach Public Libraries	peachpubliclibraries.org	PINES
Piedmont Regional Library System	prlib.org	PINES
Pine Mountain Regional Library System	pinemtnlibrary.org	PINES
Roddenbery Memorial Library	rmlibrary.org	PINES
Sara Hightower Regional Library System	shrls.org	PINES
Satilla Regional Library System	srlsys.org	PINES
Screven-Jenkins Regional Library System	sjrls.org	PINES
Sequoyah Regional Library System	sequoyahregionallibrary.org	SRLS
South Georgia Regional Library	sgrl.org	PINES
Southwest Georgia Regional Library	swgrl.org	PINES
Statesboro Regional Public Libraries	strl.info	PINES
Thomas County Public Library System	tcpls.org	PINES
Three Rivers Regional Library System	threeriverslibraries.org	PINES
Troup-Harris Regional Library	thrl.org	PINES
West Georgia Regional Library	wgrls.org	PINES
Worth County Library System	worthlib.org	PINES

== See also ==
- List of Carnegie libraries in Georgia
- Georgia Library Learning Online
- Digital Library of Georgia
- List of libraries in the United States
