= Mountain Regional Library System =

Library system in North Georgia, United States

- Location: North Georgia
- Established: 1958
- Branches: 4

Collection
- Size: 126,465 (2023)

Access and use
- Circulation: 215,443 (2023)
- Population served: 67,074 (2023)
- Members: 22,993 (2023)

Other information
- Website: http://www.mountainlibrary.com/

The Mountain Regional Library System (MRLS) is a public library system consisting of four branches in Fannin County, Towns County, and Union County, Georgia, United States.

MRLS is a member of PINES, a program of the Georgia Public Library Service that covers 53 library systems in 143 counties of Georgia. Any resident in a PINES supported library system has access to over 10.6 million books in the system's circulation. The library is also serviced by GALILEO, a program of the University System of Georgia which stands for "GeorgiA LIbrary LEarning Online". This program offers residents in supported libraries access to over 100 databases indexing thousands of periodicals and scholarly journals. It also boasts over 10,000 journal titles in full text.

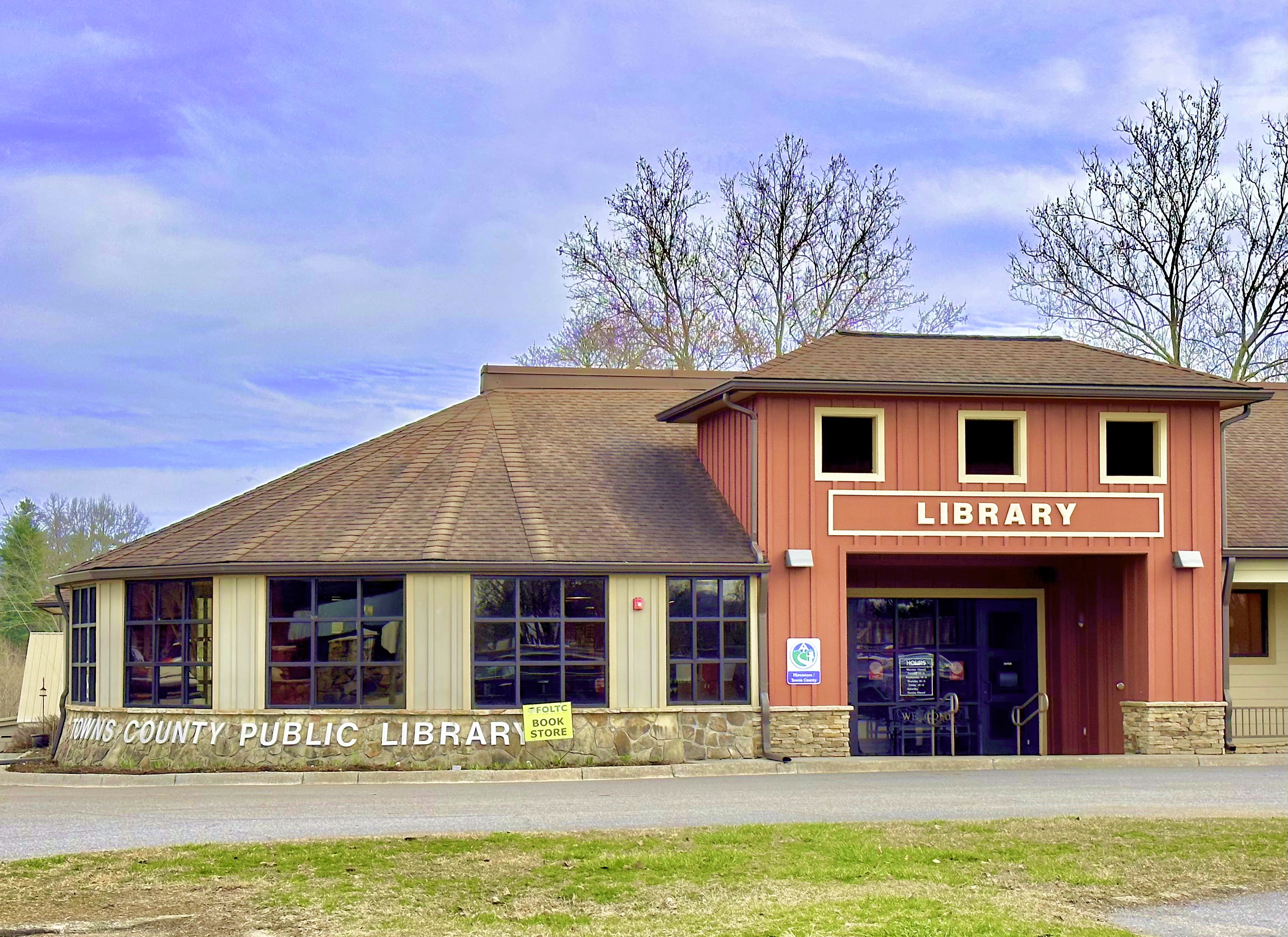
Towns County Public Library in Hiawassee

== History ==
The Mountain Regional Library System originated as a small public library to service the counties of Towns and Union, Georgia. This library, aptly named the Towns-Union Regional Library, was founded in 1946 by both the counties, as well as Young Harris College, which agreed to sponsor and provide space for the library in its infancy. The library thus was originally set up in the Rich Building on Young Harris College's campus.

By 1957, Fannin County was added to the regional library changing its name to the lengthy Fannin-Towns-Union Regional Library. In the following year, 1958, this name was shortened to the current Mountain Regional Library System. The Fannin branch built their new facility in the library system in 1973 in Blue Ridge.

In 2010 the Union County Public Library in Blairsville renovated its building, adding a genealogy room, community room, and used book store. It is currently the most visited library in the system. By 2014 the Towns County Public Library in Hiawassee also underwent renovations, costing $1 million, to completely refurbish the building and update it to modern standards.

=== 2026 grand jury recommendations ===
On October 20, 2026, the Towns County Grand Jury indicted a patron of the system's Young Harris branch, on four counts of public indecency, relating to incidents alleged to have occurred at the library on March 17 and April 9. The patron was arrested April 14, is presumed innocent until proven guilty. In its presentments the same day, the grand jury recommended "in the strongest possible terms" that the system adopt policies requiring staff to report suspected crimes on library premises to law enforcement immediately and to cooperate fully with investigations without retaliation against employees.

The recommendations followed testimony in the grand jury proceedings. District Attorney Jeff Langley said his office subpoenaed system director Heath Lee to testify, which he described as unusual, after Lee delayed responding to requests for the original security camera footage; the footage was provided October 20. Branch manager Shawna Rose Magers said she reported the April 9 incident to Lee, who told her he did not think a crime had been committed and instructed her to suspend the patron for two weeks rather than contact law enforcement. Magers said she called the Towns County Sheriff's Office on April 14 after further requests to involve police were declined. Disciplinary documents obtained by the North Georgia News show Lee subsequently cited Magers for insubordination, suspended her for one day for violating the library's confidentiality and security camera policies, and demoted her to assistant branch manager. Magers described the actions as retaliation and said she filed a complaint with the U.S. Equal Employment Opportunity Commission; she left the system on September 18.

Board chair Renee Deibert said the system could not comment on pending and ongoing litigation and that it was reviewing its policies and procedures related to employee and patron safety. Lee did not respond to the newspaper's request for comment. Lee's last day as director was October 31, 2026; the board said he accepted a position with a library system in a neighboring state and that his departure was unrelated to the incident. An interim director was named effective November 2.

== Library systems in neighboring counties ==
- Northwest Georgia Regional Library System to the west
- Sequoyah Regional Library System to the south west
- Chestatee Regional Library System to the south
- Northeast Georgia Regional Library System to the east
