= CRLS =

CRLS may refer to:

- Cambridge Rindge and Latin School
- Cherokee Regional Library System
- Chestatee Regional Library System
- Conyers-Rockdale Library System
