= Twin Lakes Library =

Library in Georgia, United States

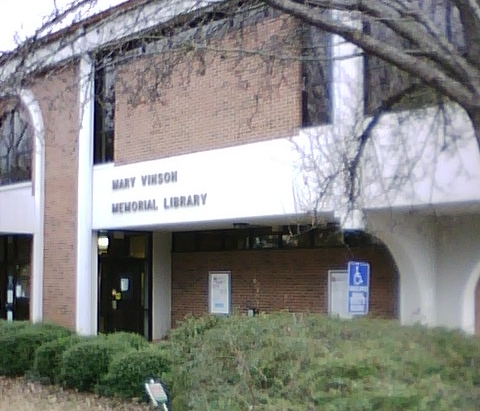
- Mary Vinson Memorial Library
- 33°4′49″N 83°13′31″W
- Location: Milledgeville, Georgia
- Type: Public Library
- Established: 1938
- Branches: 3

Collection
- Size: 97,747 (2016)

Access and use
- Circulation: 146,299 (2016)
- Population served: 46,666 (2016)
- Members: 15,083 (2016)

Other information
- Director: Jennifer Lautzenheiser
- Website: https://bibblib.org

The Twin Lakes Library (formerly, Twin Lakes Library System) serves the citizens of Milledgeville and Baldwin County, Georgia as a member county of Middle Georgia Regional Library, a PINES member library system.

PINES, a program of Georgia Public Library Service serving more than 300 libraries and affiliated service outlets of Georgia. Any resident in a PINES supported library system has access to the system's collection of 10.6 million books The library is also serviced by GALILEO, a program of the University System of Georgia which stands for "GeorgiA LIbrary LEarning Online". This program offers residents in supported libraries access to over 100 databases indexing thousands of periodicals and scholarly journals, including 10,000 journal titles in full text.

== History ==
The library was funded with a $25 monthly appropriation by the city of Milledgeville. In 1938 Julian Stanley donated a vacant building on Hancock Street, and the library opened on January 18, 1938. In July 1948, the Board of Trustees adopted a constitution and by-laws, stating that services were free for the residents of Baldwin County."

Funded by cashing in bonds, the library moved from its location on Hancock Street to the first floor of the Veterans' Building in 1953. In 1958 it became part of Middle Georgia Regional Library System and in 1961 moved to the county's old post office, and was named for Mary Vinson, the wife of Carl Vinson, who had been instrumental in building the new library.

A new 18,900 square foot (1,760 m^{2}) two-story building opened in 1987. The Mary Vinson Memorial Library became the headquarters for the new Twin Lakes Library System in July 2001. A branch library, the Lake Sinclair Library, was added on the north side of town in 2003. A third branch, the Floride Allen Library, opened in October 2008 but closed in 2011 in response to state budget cuts. In 2019, the library opened the Hancock Branch, a multi-use space in a renovated historic building.

July 1, 2021 re-merged with Middle Georgia Regional Library as their seventh member county. In late February, 2025 the Mary Vinson was closed and temporarily merged with the Hancock Branch for a 1.4 million dollar renovation to modernize the decades old building. Renovation was completed and was officially re-opened on January 6, 2026.

== Locations ==
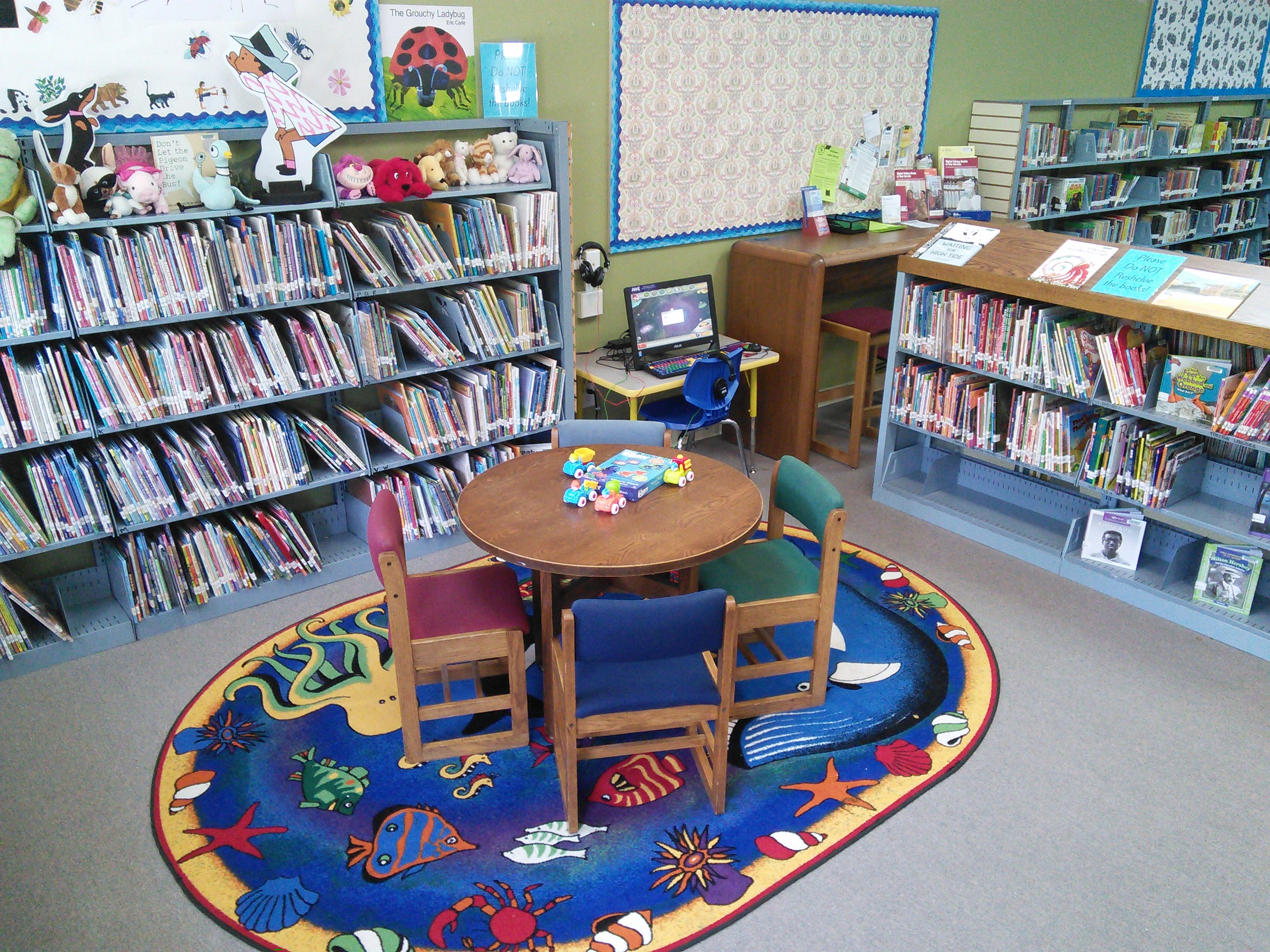
Lake Sinclair Library

The Mary Vinson Memorial Library building is a two-story structure located at 151 South Jefferson Street at the corner of Greene Street across from the north gates of Georgia Military College (formerly the State Capitol building). It can seat more than 200 people; it has a separate children's area, including an amphitheater complete with a built-in puppet stage; it has a separate room and collection for young adults; and a recently renovated genealogical and historical reading room and wireless public internet access.

The Lake Sinclair Library building is in a storefront unit located at 130 Log Cabin Road NE near the entrance to the Kroger Shopping Center. The Lake Sinclair Library was previously located at 3061 North Columbia Street on Highway 441 North near Lake Sinclair. The current location features public access computers, wireless internet access, reading areas, and the ability to pick up requested materials. The Lake Sinclair Library does house children's, young adult, and general fiction collections with some non-fiction for checkout including DVDs.

The Hancock Branch building complements the services and offerings of the Mary Vinson branch and be used to expand the library system's collection of materials, provide adult classes (including computer classes, foreign language classes, and yoga), after-school activities and programs for young adults, makerspace technology (like 3d printers), and serve as a business incubator. The building itself, located at 127 E. Hancock Street, was built as a car dealership in 1919. The library moved into the building in 2019, the building's 100th anniversary.
