= Julie White Walker =

American librarian

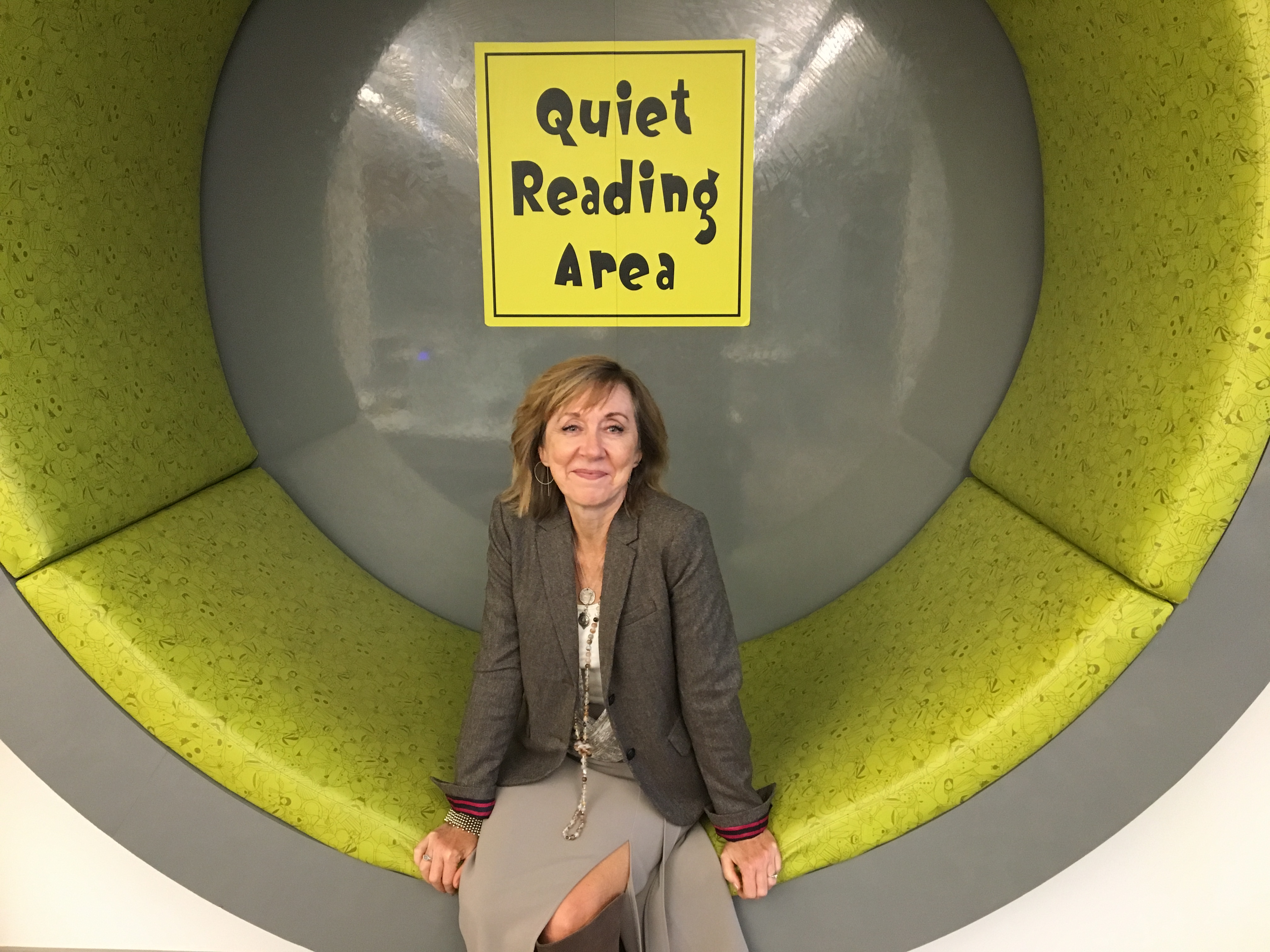

Julie White Walker is an American librarian and past state librarian of Georgia. She earned her bachelor's degree in political science from the University of North Carolina at Chapel Hill. In 1982, she earned her master's in library science from the same university.

== Career ==
Following her graduation, she worked for different libraries across North Carolina. In 1990, she became the assistant director of the Athens Regional Library System. She then served as the first director for the Public Information Network for Electronic Services (PINES) from 2003 to 2006. From 2006 to 2008, she was the assistant state librarian for support services and strategic initiatives. She became the deputy state librarian of Georgia Public Library Service (GPLS) in 2008, serving until her appointment as state librarian in 2014.

Alongside her position as state librarian, Walker also served as the vice chancellor for libraries and archives University System of Georgia, and served on the board of directors of the Chief Officers of State Library Agencies (COSLA) 2018–2022. On September 23, 2020, she was elected vice president and president elect of COSLA. Walker took office as president of COSLA on October 27, 2022.
