= West Georgia Regional Library =

Public library system in Georgia, U.S.

West Georgia Regional Library System

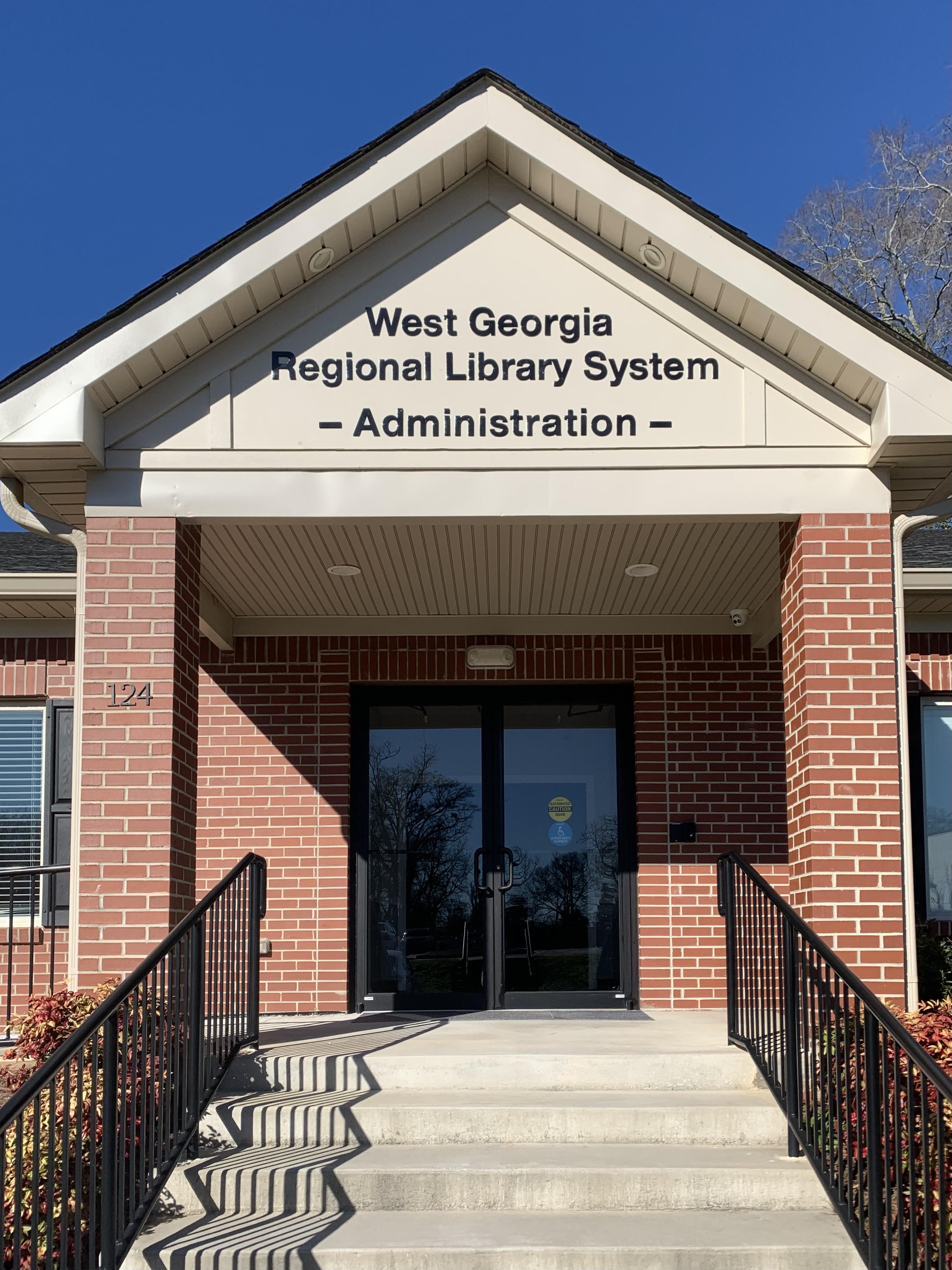
- WGRLS administration building
- Location: Northwest Georgia
- Branches: 19

Collection
- Size: 852,773

Access and use
- Circulation: 1,554,703 (2021)
- Population served: 487,659 (2020)
- Members: 163,586 (2020)

Other information
- Director: Stephen Houser
- Website: www.wgrls.org

The West Georgia Regional Library System (WGRLS) is a library system serving the public libraries of five counties of Northwest Georgia: Carroll, Douglas, Haralson, Heard, and Paulding.

WGRLS is a member of PINES, a program of the Georgia Public Library Service that covers 53 library systems in 143 counties of Georgia. Any resident in a PINES supported library system has access to over 10.6 million books in the system's circulation. The library is also serviced by GALILEO, a program of the University System of Georgia which stands for "GeorgiA LIbrary LEarning Online". This program offers residents in supported libraries access to over 100 databases indexing thousands of periodicals and scholarly journals. It also boasts over 10,000 journal titles in full text.

== History ==
Edith Foster served as Director of West Georgia Regional Library System from 1944 to 1977. She wrote a history of the library system she founded called Yonder She Comes: A Once Told Li’bry Tale. Copies are available for checkout at many WGRLS libraries.

A briefer history is available on the WGRLS website to see how the library has grown from a single location serving two counties to 19 branches in five counties that span 1,600 square miles (4,100 km^{2}).

== Libraries ==
County	Name	Address
Carroll	Warren P. Sewell Memorial Library of Bowdon	450 West Avenue, Bowdon
Carroll	Neva Lomason Memorial Library	710 Rome Street, Carrollton
Carroll	Mt. Zion Public Library	4455 Mt. Zion Road, Mt. Zion
Carroll	Ruth Holder Public Library - Temple	337 Sage Street, Temple
Carroll	Villa Rica Public Library	869 Dallas Highway, Villa Rica
Carroll	Whitesburg Public Library	800 Main Street, Whitesburg
Douglas
Douglas	Dog River Public Library	6100 Georgia Highway 5 Douglasville
Douglas	Douglas County Public Library	6810 Selman Drive, Douglasville
Douglas	Lithia Springs Public Library	7100 Turner Drive, Lithia Springs
Haralson
Haralson	Warren P. Sewell Memorial Library of Bremen	315 Hamilton Avenue, Bremen
Haralson	Buchanan-Haralson Public Library	145 Courthouse Square, Buchanan
Haralson	Tallapoosa Public Library	388 Bowdon Street, Tallapoosa
Heard
Heard	Centralhatchee Public Library	171 Notnomis Road, Franklin
Heard	Ephesus Public Library	200 Rogers Street, Roopville
Heard	Heard County Public Library	564 Main Street, Franklin
Paulding
Paulding	Crossroads Public Library	909 Harmony Grove Church Road, Acworth
Paulding	Dallas Public Library	1010 East Memorial Drive, Dallas
Paulding	Maude P. Ragsdale Public Library	1815 Hiram-Douglasville Highway, Hiram
Paulding	New Georgia Public Library	94 Ridge Road, Dallas

== Library systems in adjacent counties ==
- Sara Hightower Regional Library System, north-northwest in Polk and others
- Bartow County Library System, north-northeast in Bartow
- Cobb County Public Library System east-northeast in Cobb
- Fulton County Library System east-southeast in Fulton and part of DeKalb
- Coweta Public Library System to the southeast
- Troup-Harris Regional Library to the south
