= Catoosa County Library =

Public library in Georgia, United States

- 34°56′7″N 85°10′54″W
- Location: 108 Catoosa Circle, Ringgold, Georgia
- Established: 1937 (library); 2009 (system)
- Branches: 1

Collection
- Size: 155,186 (2020)

Access and use
- Circulation: 220,129 (2020)
- Population served: 68,771 (2020)
- Members: 17,190 (2020)

Other information
- Budget: $1,069,000 (2014)
- Director: Sarah Holmes
- Website: http://www.catoosacountylibrary.org/

The Catoosa County Library is a single branch public library system serving Catoosa County, Georgia, United States. The library branch is located in Ringgold.

The library is a member of PINES, a program of the Georgia Public Library Service that covers 53 library systems in 143 counties of Georgia. Any resident in a PINES supported library system has access to the system's collection of 10.6 million books. The library is also serviced by GALILEO, a program of the University System of Georgia which stands for "GeorgiA LIbrary LEarning Online". This program offers residents in supported libraries access to over 100 databases indexing thousands of periodicals and scholarly journals. It also boasts over 10,000 journal titles in full text.

== History ==
Two libraries originally served the county of Catoosa. The first was located in Ringgold, named the Ringgold Public Library. It was established in 1937 with help from the Works Progress Administration and was housed for one year in the upstairs of the old Methodist parsonage in town. With the completion of a new city courthouse in 1938, the library was rededicated as the Core Jones Murphey Library and moved to the basement, where it remained until 1971. The second library in the county, the Fort Oglethorpe Library, was constructed in 1971 and served the residents in the Fort Oglethorpe section of Catoosa County.

In 1943 the State Department of Education and Georgia Legislature passed a bill granting increased state funding to libraries in rural areas if they chose to make a regional library system with neighboring counties. The Dalton Public Library board of Whitfield County approached Catoosa County with the request of a merger to join the system and become eligible for more financial support. The Ringgold Public Library thus became the first affiliate library of what was named the Dalton Regional Library in 1945. Gordon County soon joined in 1957, as did Murray County in 1958. With the creation of the Fort Oglethorpe library in 1971, the system changed its name to the Northwest Georgia Regional Library System.

In the late 1990s a SPLOST campaign set out to provide funding for a new library building in the county that would consolidate the Ringgold and Fort Oglethorpe collections into one building. $3 million was set aside to construct a public facility complex named the Benton Place Campus, with $1.9 million dedicated to the new library facility. Construction of the library was completed in 1999, and in the same year the Mildred E. Ward Special Collections Room was dedicated to the community as a genealogical and local history room for south Tennessee and Georgia. The room holds collections of Revolutionary and Civil War military records, local obituaries and pension cards, and a large Native American section focusing on the Cherokee Nation which had originally lived in the area.

In 2008 the library joined PINES, an open border library system across the state of Georgia. This increased the virtual collection size to over 9.5 million books. Upon becoming a PINES affiliated library, Catoosa County opted to leave the Northwest Georgia Regional Library System and create its own system. The Catoosa County Library system was officially dedicated in 2009.

== Library systems in neighboring counties ==
- Cherokee Regional Library System to the west
- Northwest Georgia Regional Library System to the east
