= Sara Hightower Regional Library System =

System of public libraries in Georgia

Coordinates: 34.258237°N 85.169044°W

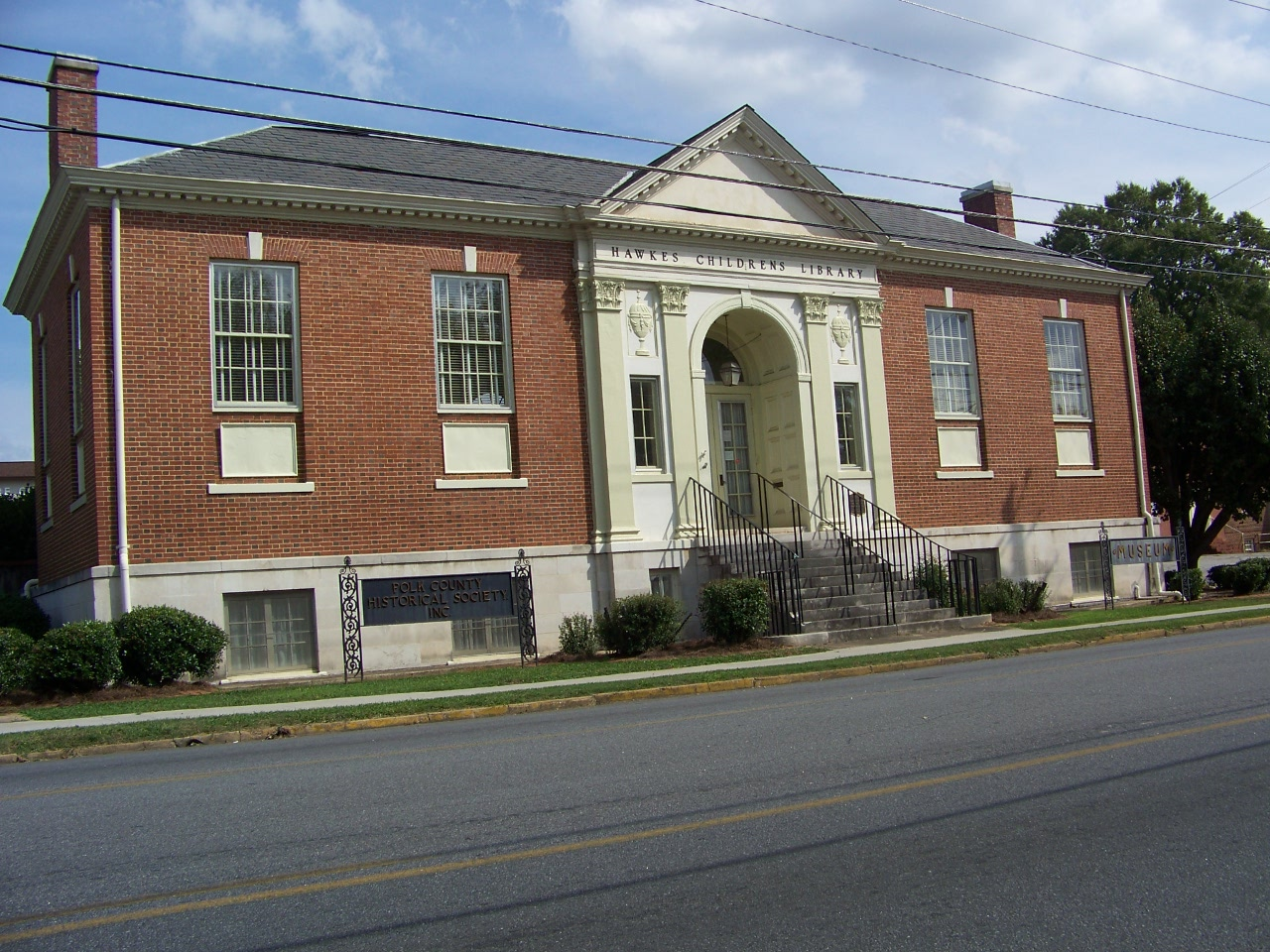
- The Hawkes Children's Library
- Location: Northwest Georgia
- Established: 1974
- Branches: 6

Collection
- Size: 505,398

Access and use
- Circulation: 579,367 (2015)
- Population served: 138,420 (2015)
- Members: 67,752 (2015)

Other information
- Director: Delana Sissel
- Website: shrls.org

The Sara Hightower Regional Library System (SHRLS) is a system of six public libraries in the Northwest Georgia region serving Chattooga County, Polk County and Floyd County. The headquarters of the system is the Rome-Floyd County Library, located in Rome, Georgia.

Patrons of the library receive a PINES library card. This card may be used at any of the 275 libraries affiliated with the program across Georgia, as well as the six branches in the Sara Hightower Regional Library System, and is open to all Georgia residents. The SHRLS is also affiliated with the GLASS (Georgia Libraries for Accessible Statewide Services) program which offers library services for the blind and physically handicapped.

Because of its size, encompassing multiple counties in northwestern Georgia, SHRLS has one of the highest interlibrary loan percentages in the state, with approximately 30,000 books on ILL over the 2015 year.

== History ==
Looking to construct a public library in Rome, many prominent members of the public petitioned industrialist Andrew Carnegie for funds, as he had donated money to build hundreds of libraries elsewhere across the county. On December 24, 1909, Carnegie approved a $15,000 building plan, and donated the money on the condition the town would pay an annual upkeep and maintenance fee of $1,500 to keep the building in good condition. While an initial blueprint of the building called for a 1,200 to 1,500 capacity auditorium, the final building excluded this feature as per Carnegie's personal aversion to large lecture halls in public libraries. The building was formally dedicated to the public on May 2, 1911, with a collection of 1,800 books which originally belonged to the Young Men's Library Association, which existed in the late 1800s as a subscription-based library.

The next branch built in the Sara Hightower Regional Library System was the Cedartown branch. The planning for this library began in 1914 when A.K. Hawkes of Atlanta gifted $7,500 to be split among five towns in Georgia to build libraries for children. The Cedartown Cotton and Export Company donated land to be used for the library. To match the donation by Hawkes, the town raised $30,000 for construction.

In 1921 the Hawkes Children's Library opened. It grew quickly over the next half century, necessitating a move to the New City Complex in 1974, when the name was changed to the present-day Cedartown Library.

The Cave Spring branch began as a white concrete block building in the 1950s on the boundaries of the Cave Springs School property. Most of its members were students who used the library because of its proximity to their school. In this decade the Carnegie building also began receiving improvements. Increased shelving space in an addition was added to the building in 1951, and a reading garden was constructed in 1958.

During the 1960s the counties of Polk and Floyd joined with Bartow County to create the Tri-County Library System. For the next twenty years this consortium would work with the Mary Munford Library in Cartersville, before it branched off in 1981 to form the Bartow County Library System.

Another renovation to the Carnegie building in 1983 added an additional exterior room for more shelving space. In 1988 the Cave Spring building was dedicated to the community and moved to its current location on Cedartown street. The Carnegie Library was eventually replaced with the Rome-Floyd Public Library located on Riverside Parkway.

On 1 November 2020, the Chattooga County Library System library system merged with the Sara Hightower Regional Library System.

== Branches ==
Name	Address	Website
Cave Spring-Floyd County Library	17 Cedartown Street Cave Spring, GA 30124	http://cavespring.shrls.org/
Cedartown-Polk County Library	245 East Avenue Cedartown, Georgia 30125	http://cedartown.shrls.org/
Chattooga-Chattooga County Library	360 Farrar Drive Summerville, Georgia 30747	http://chattooga.shrls.org/
Rockmart-Polk County Library	316 North Piedmont Avenue Building 201 Rockmart, Georgia 30153	http://rockmart.shrls.org/
Rome-Floyd County Public Library	205 Riverside Pkwy Rome, GA 30161	http://rome.shrls.org/
Trion-Chattooga County Library	15 Bulldog Boulevard Trion, GA 30753	http://trion.shrls.org/

== Library systems in neighboring counties ==
- Cherokee Regional Library System to the north
- Bartow County Library System to the east
- West Georgia Regional Library System to the south
- Northwest Georgia Regional Library System to the northeast
