= HCLS =

HCLS may refer to:

- Hall County Library System
- Henry County Library System
