= Chief Officers of State Library Agencies =

The Chief Officers of State Library Agencies (COSLA) was established November 29, 1973, by a committee of the State Library Agency Division (SLAD) with the purpose of providing a continuing mechanism for dealing with the problems faced by the heads of those state agencies which are responsible for statewide library development in the United States, Canada and related territories.

== Formation ==
The Chief Officers of State Library Agencies was formed at the annual ASLA conference held in Las Vegas in 1973. The meeting was called by ASLA President Lyle Eberhart, to focus on the impact of federal library legislation and its impact on state organizations. This was in response to the Nixon administration’s threat to cut funding to the Library Services and Construction Act (LSCA) which provided resources to the states. Since that time the COSLA has been a major influence on national library policy. COSLA procedures were modeled on those of the Council of Chief State School Officers.

=== Mission statement ===
COSLA's mission is to provide leadership on issues of common concern and national interest, to further state library agency relationships with the federal government and national organizations, and to initiate, maintain and support cooperative action for the improvement of library services.

== Membership ==
Membership includes the chief officer of each of the fifty state library programs in the United States, the District of Columbia, Puerto Rico, the US Virgin Islands, American Samoa, Guam, the Federated States of Micronesia, the Northern Mariana Islands, the Republic of Palau, the Republic of the Marshall Islands, as well as the ten provinces and three territories of Canada. Each member may designate an alternate, but each has only one vote.

== Governing structure ==
The board consists of seven individuals including President, Vice-President, Secretary, Treasurer, Past President and two directors.

=== Presidents ===
- 2022-24. Julie Walker, State Librarian, Georgia Public Library Services
- 2020-22. Jennie Stapp, State Librarian, Montana State Library
- 2018-20.
- 2016-18. Stacey Aldrich, State Librarian, Hawaii State Public Library System
- 2014-16. Sandra Treadway, Librarian of Virginia, Commonwealth of Virginia
- 2012-14. Kendall Wiggin, State Librarian, State of Connecticut
- 2010-12. Lamar Veatch, Georgia State Librarian, Georgia Public Library Service
- 2008-10. Susan McVey, State Librarian State of Oklahoma, Oklahoma Department of Libraries
- 2006-08. Gary Nichols, State Librarian, Maine State Library
- 2004-06. Gladys Ann Wells, State Librarian, Arizona State Library, Archives and Public Records
- 2002-04. Karen Crane, Director of Alaska State Libraries Archives and Museums, State of Alaska

== Notable activities ==
2016 - Measures That Matter. A joint project of the Institute of Museum and Library Services (IMLS) and COSLA to develop a public library data and outcomes action plan.

== See also ==
- Official Website
