= Hart County Library =

Public library in Georgia, United States

Coordinates: 34.349793°N 82.930786°W

- Location: Hartwell, Georgia
- Established: 1938
- Branches: 1

Collection
- Size: 36,707 (2016)

Access and use
- Circulation: 29,788 (2016)
- Population served: 25,718 (2016)
- Members: 4,887 (2016)

Other information
- Director: Richard Sanders
- Website: http://www.hartcountylibrary.com/

The Hart County Library is a single branch public library serving the population of Hart County, Georgia, United States. It is located in Hartwell at 150 Benson Street. In 2016 the library was named Georgia's Public Library of the Year.

Hart County Library is a member of PINES, a program of the Georgia Public Library Service that covers 53 library systems in 143 counties of Georgia. Any resident in a PINES supported library system has access to the system's 10.6 million book collection. The library is also serviced by GALILEO, a program of the University System of Georgia which stands for "GeorgiA LIbrary LEarning Online". This program offers residents in supported libraries access to over 100 databases indexing thousands of periodicals and scholarly journals. It also boasts over 10,000 journal titles in full text.

== History ==
=== Founding ===
In 1938 the first iteration of a county library in Hart County began with the Hartwell Woman's Club appointing a library committee and requesting book donations from each member of the community. Books at this time were housed in the Community Woman's Club House and circulated twice a week by volunteers. By 1939, with the advent of Franklin Delano Roosevelt's Public Works Administration, a paid librarian was hired and the collection was moved to a nearby drugstore with rent paid for by various support groups in the community.

In 1941 the Hart County Courthouse underwent renovations and planned to add an annex to house the county library collection. After the addition, the library moved their collection (at the time composed of 600 volumes) into the newly vacant offices of the Ordinary and Clerk of the Court. Here the library was housed until a fire in 1968 burned down the courthouse, along with many of the books. With a county decision to rebuild the courthouse came a new decree that the library would not be included in the new plans. Without a building to house their books, the Hart County library board decided to temporarily join with neighboring Elbert County to create their own small library system named the War Woman Regional Library System.

=== Current building ===
In 1973 the library board completed an application with the Georgia Division of Public Library Services for funding of a new library building. The division matched $150,000 raised by the community, and by 1975 the current 10,000 square foot new building finished construction. By 1987, in need of more space, one final addition was added to the library. This new floor space increased the layout of the library by 5,000 square feet, providing space for book stacks, a meeting room, and storage.

In 2016 the Hart County Library was chosen first among 409 other public libraries in the state of Georgia as the Public Library of the Year.

== Library systems in neighboring counties ==
- Athens Regional Library System to the west
- Elbert County Public Library to the south
