= Piedmont Regional Library System =

Regional library group in Georgia, United States

- Location: Barrow, Banks, Jackson counties
- Branches: 10

Collection
- Size: 260,081 (2016)

Access and use
- Circulation: 598,505 (2016)
- Population served: 161,465 (2016)
- Members: 50,309 (2016)

Other information
- Director: Beth McIntyre
- Website: http://prlib.org/

The Piedmont Regional Library System (PRLS) is a consortium of ten public libraries serving the counties of Banks, Barrow, and Jackson, Georgia, United States.

PRLS is a member of PINES, a program of the Georgia Public Library Service that covers 53 library systems in 143 counties of Georgia. Any resident in a PINES supported library system has access to over 10.6 million books in the system's circulation. The library is also serviced by GALILEO, a program of the University System of Georgia which stands for "GeorgiA LIbrary LEarning Online". This program offers residents in supported libraries access to over 100 databases indexing thousands of periodicals and scholarly journals. It also boasts over 10,000 journal titles in full text.

== Branches ==
County	Name	Address
Banks County	Banks County Public Library	226 Highway 51 South, Homer, GA 30547
Barrow County	Auburn Public Library	24 5th Street, Auburn, GA 30011
Barrow County	Statham Public Library	1928 Railroad Street, Statham, GA 30666
Barrow County	Winder Public Library	189 Bellview Street, Winder, GA 30680
Jackson County	Braselton Public Library	15 Brassie Lane, Braselton, GA 30517
Jackson County	Commerce Public Library	1344 South Broad Street, Commerce, GA 30529
Jackson County	Harold S. Swindle Public Library	5466 U.S. Highway 441 South, Nicholson, GA 30565
Jackson County	Jefferson Public Library	1000 Washington Street Jefferson, GA 30549
Jackson County	Maysville Public Library	9247 Gillsville Rd, Maysville, GA 30558
Jackson County	Talmo Public Library	45 A.J. Irvin Rd, Talmo, GA 30575

== Library systems in neighboring counties ==
- Northeast Georgia Regional Library System to the north
- Athens Regional Library System to the east
- Azalea Regional Library System to the south
- Gwinnett County Public Library to the southwest
- Hall County Library System to the west
