= Chattooga County Library System =

Public library system in Georgia, U.S.

- Location: Chattooga County, Georgia
- Branches: 2

Collection
- Size: 103,033 (2020)

Access and use
- Circulation: 51,218 (2020)
- Population served: 24,766 (2020)
- Members: 8,390 (2020)

Other information
- Director: Susan Stephens
- Website: http://chattoogacountylibrary.org/

The Chattooga County Library System (CCLS) was a public library system consisting of two libraries in Chattooga County, Georgia, United States, in the northwest region of the state. On 1 November 2020, the library system merged with the Sara Hightower Regional Library System. The library headquarters and main branch is located in Summerville with a second, smaller branch in Trion.

CCLS is a part of PINES, a public library network of 281 libraries in 140 counties throughout Georgia. Any resident of Georgia may receive a PINES library card which allows them access to any of the 8 million books in its collection across the state. The library is also member of GALILEO, Georgia's ‘virtual library’ which facilitates online access to over 100 databases (including magazine articles and online books) for researchers and students on a wide variety of topics.

== Library systems in neighboring counties ==
- Cherokee Regional Library System to the north.
- Sara Hightower Regional Library System to the south.
