= Hall County Library System =

Library System in Hall County, Georgia, United States

- Location: Hall County, Georgia
- Established: 1997
- Branches: 5

Collection
- Size: 227,670 (2016)

Access and use
- Circulation: 606,188 (2016)
- Population served: 197,356 (2016)
- Members: 52,771 (2016)

Other information
- Director: Lisa MacKinney
- Website: http://www.hallcountylibrary.org/

The Hall County Library System (HCLS) is a public library system in Hall County, Georgia, United States, consisting of five public libraries. Four of these libraries are located in Gainesville, with the newest branch, Spout Springs, in Flowery Branch.

HCLS is a member of PINES, a program of the Georgia Public Library Service that covers 53 library systems in 143 counties of Georgia. Any resident in a PINES supported library system has access to over 10.6 million books in the system's circulation. The library is also serviced by GALILEO, a program of the University System of Georgia which stands for "GeorgiA LIbrary LEarning Online". This program offers residents in supported libraries access to over 100 databases indexing thousands of periodicals and scholarly journals. It also boasts over 10,000 journal titles in full text.

== History ==
=== Origins ===
The first origins of a library in Hall County began in 1933 in Grace Episcopal Church. This small library housed very few books and was founded by the ladies of the church. In 1936 the church was severely damaged due to the famous Tupelo-Gainesville tornado, and residents of the community were forced to build the groundwork for a new public library to serve the community.

In 1937 the Hall County Library Board met to decide on a new location for the library. Without enough funding, the library hosted a Library Day event in which they raised money to purchase new volumes and increase capital for a new location. Still, without enough money to open a standalone library, the collection was moved to the basement of the courthouse in 1938.

With the ever-growing collection, the board decided to open up depository libraries throughout the county rather than build a centralized location. Several of these depository libraries were created and established in various places such as: a grocery store in Murrayville, the town hall of Lula, a beauty shop in Flowery Branch, and one final location in Clermont. The first branch library was still not its own building but rather used space in one of the classroom of Northwestern School, a private school for black students. This location soon moved across the street to the Fair Street School.

=== Chestatee Regional Library System ===
In the 1950s a bookmobile was started, carrying between 1000 and 1500 books at any given time. By 1953 Hall County and Lumpkin County decided to make a joint library consortium to pool their collections together and began the Chestatee Regional Library System. Now, with heightened need for a dedicated library building, the town voted on a budget in 1956 to build a new library but it was vetoed by the county judge. Another attempt in 1958 was subsequently voted down. Not until 1967 did Hall County agree to build their own library, and it was dedicated as the regional headquarters for the Chestatee Regional Library System in 1970.

The next decade was full of expansion. 1975 saw the introduction of the Library for the Blind and Physically Handicapped. The Clermont Branch opened in 1981, and the Blackshear Place Library was opened in 1991. In 1994 new branches were constructed in Murrayville and Rabbittown. With such a large increase in library space and a vast expansion in collection size, Hall County decided to leave the library system in 1997 and form their own. Finally, in 2008 the Spout Springs Branch Library was opened in Flowery Branch.

== Branches ==
Name	Address
Blackshear Place Branch	2927 Atlanta Hwy, Gainesville, Ga. 30507
Gainesville Branch	127 Main Street NW, Gainesville, GA 30501
Murrayville Library	4796 Thompson Bridge Rd, Gainesville, GA 30506
North Hall Tech Center	4175 Nopone Rd. Suite B, Gainesville, Ga. 30506
Spout Springs Branch	6488 Spout Springs Rd, Flowery Branch, Ga. 30542

== Library systems in neighboring counties ==
- Chestatee Regional Library System to the northwest
- Northeast Georgia Regional Library System to the northeast
- Piedmont Regional Library System to the east
- Gwinnett County Public Library to the south
- Forsyth County Public Library to the west
