= Mack Haygood Public Library =

History of the segregated Mack Haygood Library

The Mack Haygood Public Library was a segregated Black library in Lawrenceville, Georgia, that operated from 1958 to 1967.

== Organization ==
The Parent Teacher Association of the segregated Hooper-Renwick School opened the Mack Haygood Public Library on May 30, 1958 in Lawrenceville, Georgia. It was a segregated library for the Black residents of Gwinnett, Forsyth, and Dawson counties, who were not allowed into the Lake Lanier Regional Library system's white-only libraries The majority of library users were from Gwinnett County, which had a population of 9.4% non-white in 1950, with very few potential users from Forsyth County (0.5% non-white population) or Dawson County (0% non-white population).

The origin of the name of the library is unclear, but there were two Black men (father and son) named Mack C Haygood living in Lawrenceville, Georgia, at this time.

Mrs. Fannie Lou Summerour Paxton (1931-2021) served as Librarian. She was the niece of Mack Haygood, Jr. (1909-1994), the daughter of his sister Nellie Haygood Summerour.

== Closure ==
The passage of the Civil Rights Act of 1964 greatly impacted the Mack Haygood Public Library. The Gwinnett County Library Board of Trustees, then part of the Gwinnett-Forsyth Region Library system, integrated their white only libraries in the summer of 1965. At first, the Mack Haygood branch remained open, allowing the white libraries being desegregated in policy but not practice.

Beginning in the summer of 1964 the library was repeatedly vandalized, and the Board could not afford to continually pay for repairs. The Gwinnett County Library Board of Trustees voted to close the Mack Haygood Branch on March 1, 1967. As an alternative to segregated branches, the County's bus mobile service shifted to focus on serving the Black community.
