= Athens Regional Library System =

Public library system in northeast, Georgia, U.S.

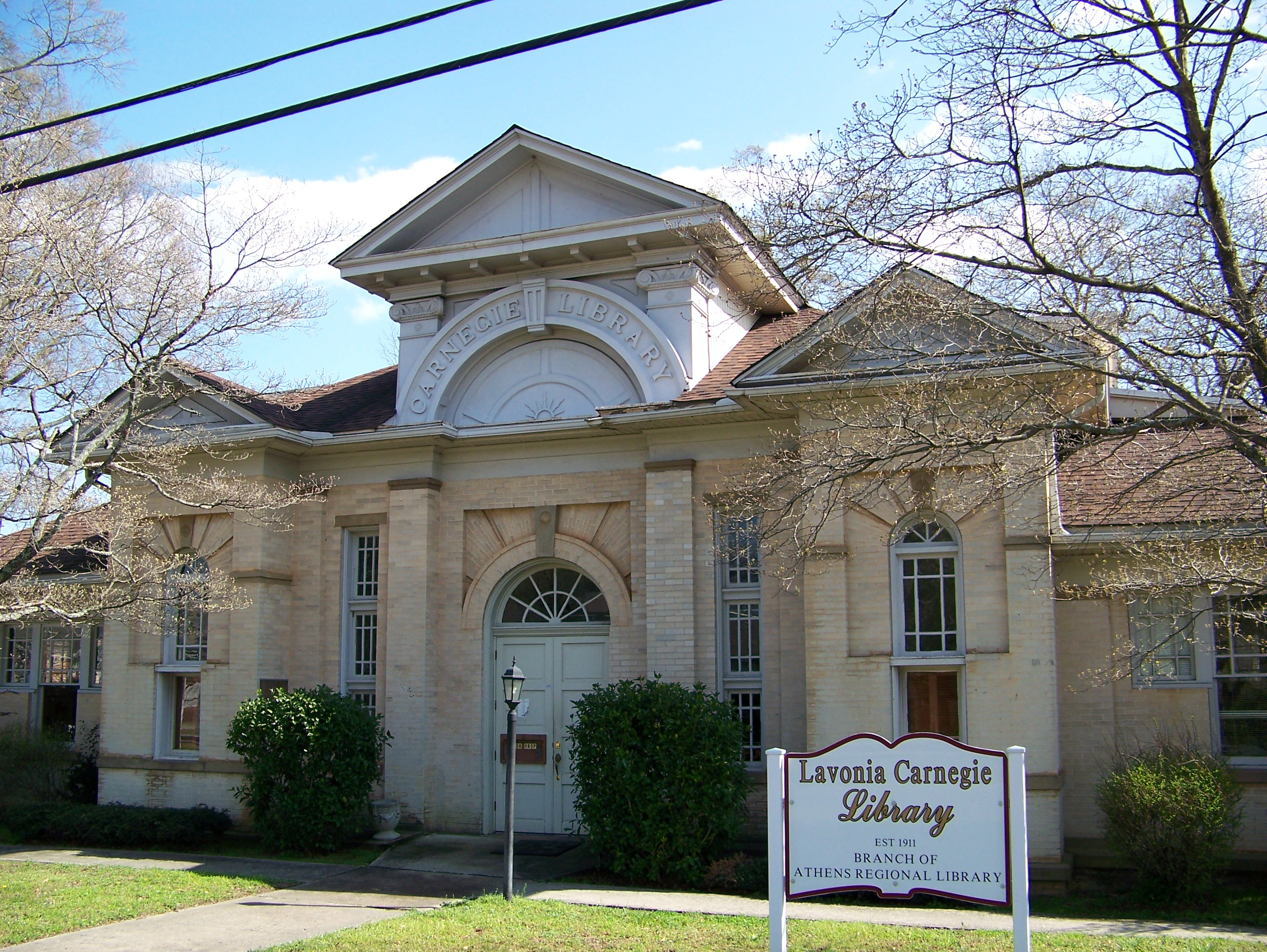
- The Carnegie Library in Lavonia
- Location: Northeast Georgia
- Established: 1940
- Branches: 11

Collection
- Size: 490,792 (2020)

Access and use
- Circulation: 847,652 (2020)
- Population served: 231,682 (2020)
- Members: 78,809 (2020)

Other information
- Director: Elizabeth McIntyre
- Website: www.athenslibrary.org

The Athens Regional Library System (ARLS) is a consortium of 11 public libraries across five counties, comprising the Athens – Clarke County metropolitan area as well as Franklin County in northeast Georgia, United States.

The ARLS is a member of PINES, a statewide public library that includes, as of 2017, 300 member libraries covering 146 counties in Georgia. Any member of the ARLS will receive a PINES library card which grants them access to over 8 million books in the PINES circulation. The library is also a member of the Georgia Library Learning Online (GALILEO) which is a resource with over 100 databases for active members to view thousands of journals and scholarly articles. In 2008, the library began to offer patrons access to downloadable audiobooks through the Georgia Download Destination. This service expanded to eBooks in 2011.

== Branches ==
In 2002, the library opened three Resource Centers at East Athens, Lay Park, and Pinewoods Library & Learning Center.

Name	Address	Website
Athens-Clarke County Library	2025 Baxter St, Athens, GA 30606	www.athenslibrary.org/athens
Lay Park Community Center	297 Hoyt Street, Athens, Georgia 30601	www.athenslibrary.org/lay-park-resource-center
Aaron Heard Resource Center	400 McKinley Drive, Athens, GA 30601	www.athenslibrary.org/aaronheard
Pinewoods Library	1465 Hwy 29 North Lot F-12, Athens, Georgia 30628	www.athenslibrary.org/pinewoods
Bogart Library	200 South Burson Avenue, Bogart, GA 30622	www.athenslibrary.org/bogart
Lavonia-Carnegie Library	28 Hartwell Road, Lavonia, Georgia 30553	www.athenslibrary.org/lavonia
Madison County Library	1315 Highway 98 West, Danielsville, Georgia 30633	www.athenslibrary.org/madison
Oconee County Library	1080 Experiment Station Rd, Watkinsville, Georgia 30677	www.athenslibrary.org/oconee
Oglethorpe County Library	858 Athens Rd. (Hwy 78), Lexington, Georgia 30648	www.athenslibrary.org/oglethorpe
Royston Public Library	634 Franklin Springs Street, Royston, Georgia 30662	www.athenslibrary.org/royston
Winterville Library	115 Marigold Lane, Winterville, Georgia 30683	www.athenslibrary.org/winterville

== History ==
The earliest records for a library in the region date to March 11, 1810, where an active Library Society was founded by a citizen named Sterling Elder. Not much else is known of this library system, save for references of the society meetings in the newspaper at the time, the Athens Gazette.

The first library to be built that is now part of the system is the Lavonia-Carnegie Library in Lavonia, built in 1911 with funding from Andrew Carnegie.

A second library began in 1915 when two citizens of the county, Mary Oberby and L. Campbell, donated their collection of books to the public starting the Mary Overby Library. The library was then located on the second floor of the Ashford Building on Main Street. The Mary Overby Library ran until 1926, when it donated its entire collection to the Oconee High School Library.

=== Regional library formation ===
With the advent of the Works Progress Administration the county Board of Trustees and Athens Woman's Club began organizing a regional library. The headquarters were in Athens, and thus the original name was the Athens Regional Library. This was the first regional library in the state. Clarke, Oconee, and Oglethorpe counties were all involved in this system. A bookmobile donated by the WPA was used to service the region along with a trained librarian, truck driver, and operating expenses. Book loans were offered to residents of the county at the rate of two books allowed checked out per week, one being fiction and the other being non-fiction.

The final two counties to join the system were Madison County in 1953, and Franklin County in 1974, through a merger. 1974 also saw the opening of a new branch in Winterville, in a two-room house from the county's work camp. Local citizens contributed to the renovation through a co-signed loan, which was repaid with proceeds from the Winterville Marigold Festival.

During the 1970s the Athens-Clarke County Library began to show signs of age and overcrowding was becoming an issue. A campaign was set up to raise money for a new building. This new building, located on Research Road, was dedicated in May 1976. Soon after, in 1977 the Carnegie library in Lavonia underwent complete renovations. The main branch was expanded again in 1987. In 1991, Bogart Library showed similar signs of overcrowding.

In 2011 the main branch in Athens-Clarke County received money to renovate the library, adding 20,000 square feet to the 63,000 square foot building.

=== Awards ===
The Regional Library System was named as one of the American Library Association and Dollar General American Dream Libraries in 2018. The American Dream program supports literacy by encouraging libraries to build replicable programs, develop community strategies, and provide resources for other libraries across the country to emulate. ARLS used these funds to offer a six-week ESL Culinary Literacy class to assist adult learners to become more confident with the English language while also learning how to cook healthy, budget-friendly meals. The classes were held at the main branch and used the Edible Alphabet curriculum, developed by the Free Library in Philadelphia's Culinary Literacy Center at the Parkway Central Library.

Athens Regional Library System was named Georgia's Public Library of The Year for 2017 by the Georgia Public Library Service (GPLS). The award is one of five annual Georgia Public Library Awards, honoring the outstanding service and achievements of Georgia's public libraries, librarians and advocates during the previous year. This was the first time the award had been given to a regional library system and not an individual library.

The Pinewoods Branch was opened through funding won by the ARLS from the U.S. Institute of Museum and Library Services. ARLS and the Lyndon House Arts Center were granted a National Leadership Grant for Libraries in 2004 under the program name "Bridging the Gap". This grant was used to start the Pinewoods Spanish language branch, known in Spanish as Biblioteca y Centro Educativo de la Comunidad Pinewoods, which opened in 2009. In 2009 it was recognized as one of three finalists for Library Journal's 2009 Best Small Library in America - an award sponsored by the Bill and Melinda Gates Foundation.

ARLS received a Governor's Award in the Humanities in 1989. The library was also recognized by the State Board of Education for outstanding programming.

== Library systems in neighboring counties ==
- Northeast Georgia Regional Library System to the north
- Azalea Regional Library System to the south
- Piedmont Regional Library System to the west
- Bartram Trail Regional Library System to the east
- Hart County Library to the east
- Elbert County Public Library to the east
