= Elbert County Public Library =

Coordinates: 34.107382°N 82.859526°W

- Location: Elbert County, Georgia
- Branches: 2

Collection
- Size: 65,156 (2016)

Access and use
- Circulation: 48,566 (2016)
- Population served: 19,505 (2016)
- Members: 6,495 (2016)

Other information
- Director: Jan Burroughs
- Website: http://www.elbertlibrary.org/

The Elbert County Public Library (ECPL) is a public library system made up of two branches serving the population of Elbert County, Georgia.

ECPL is a member of PINES, a program of the Georgia Public Library Service that covers 53 library systems in 143 counties of Georgia. Any resident in a PINES supported library system has access to the system's 10.6 million book collection. The library is also serviced by GALILEO, a program of the University System of Georgia which stands for "GeorgiA LIbrary LEarning Online". This program offers residents in supported libraries access to over 100 databases indexing thousands of periodicals and scholarly journals. It also boasts over 10,000 journal titles in full text.

== History ==
In 1968 Elbert County agreed to create a temporary library system with neighboring Hart County to pool their resources after the Hart County collection was mostly destroyed in a fire. During this time the libraries worked under the same name, the War Woman Regional Library System.

In 2012 the Georgia Department of Labor closed their Elbert County job offices, causing some unrest in the community as their unemployment rates were 3.1% higher than the national average at 11.3% of the population. The Elbert County Public Library in the interim offered to provide more resources to those in their community, as the next nearest department of labor offices were located farther away in Athens, Georgia. Among the services provided "library visitors can conduct job searches on the Internet, file claims for unemployment insurance benefits, research careers, update or create résumés, and obtain a wide range of additional services."

== Branches ==
The Elbert County Library System consists of two branches. The Elbert County Public library is the central library of the system and is located at 345 Heard Street in Elberton. A newer, smaller branch, the Bowman Branch, is used as a service outlet and is located at 21 Prince Avenue, Bowman. This branch is part of a new Georgia $21.7 million capital investment to modernize public libraries, with Bowman Library receiving $424,000 to upgrade its own amenities.

The library also provides service to area daycares, nursing homes, senior living centers, and individuals who are unable to visit the library on their own via a bookmobile.

== Library systems in neighboring counties ==
- Hart County Library to the north
- Athens Regional Library System to the west
- Bartram Trail Regional Library System to the south
- Greater Clarks Hill Regional Library System to the southeast
