= Public Information Network for Electronic Services =

- Location: Georgia, USA
- Established: 1999
- Branches: 283

Collection
- Size: 10,598,805 (2016)

Access and use
- Access requirements: Participating library system
- Circulation: 17,264,835 (2016)
- Members: 1,860,321 (2016)

Other information
- Budget: $1.1 million
- Director: Elizabeth McKinney
- Employees: 8
- Website: https://pines.georgialibraries.org/

The Public Information Network for Electronic Services (or PINES) is the nearly statewide library consortium and its online library catalog of the Georgia Public Library Service. By June 2017, the catalog consisted of books from 284 library facilities in 143 counties across the U.S. state of Georgia with a collection size of 10.6 million items, all of which are searchable by anyone with a PINES library card which can be obtained free of charge from any PINES-participating library.

The PINES system effectively turns most of the state of Georgia into one huge library. PINES cardholders are able to request an interlibrary loan from any affiliated library, and the single statewide library card grants access to the hundreds of branches associated with the service. PINES also manages the booking of rooms, the use of remote self-check machines, allows automated search and retrieval, as well as supports RSS and Schema.org standards.

PINES developed the open-source software Evergreen, an integrated library system which it and other library consortia use to manage their online catalogs.

== History ==
=== PINES development ===
In 1998 a white paper was created exploring the feasibility of a statewide public library card for Georgia. As Georgia had consistently ranked among the lowest states in public library funding per capita it was agreed that a universal library card could be of great benefit to the residents of Georgia as long as the affiliated libraries were unified under one single integrated library system (ILS). It was also believed that by establishing a state-wide library cost to individual library systems would be lowered as they wouldn't need to maintain their own integrated library systems, and certain tasks could be centralized through the state saving additional time.

By 1999 PINES became a reality, administered by the current Georgia Public Library Service (GPLS). It initially was used as a Y2K state-funded project to address needs of public libraries without Y2K-compliant ILS computer services. These libraries, mostly rural, were deemed not to have programs that would survive into the 21st century. Some libraries were still not automated as well. The PINES initiative would give these libraries access first, bringing their services into the modern era. Looking to complete the project before the year 2000, on April 8, 1999, the initial contract to develop the ILS was awarded to KPMG partnered with the SIRSI Corporation and Sun Microsystems.

In December 1999 the new software was finished and ready for deployment. In that same month Phase 1 of PINES went live with 98 affiliated libraries. For the next two years other libraries saw the success of PINES, and rather than replace their outdated ILS with a new independent one, requested to join the statewide system. In 2001 Phase 2 of PINES went live with an addition 111 libraries joining the service.

=== Evergreen development ===
In 2004 the GPLS decided not to renew their contract with KPMG/Sirsi after being advised that under the current software no more libraries would be able to be added to the system. As a result, the GPLS explored the possibility of creating their own software, and on June 4, 2004, a press release by the state librarian outlined a two-year development plan for a new PINES ILS software called Evergreen.

The new ILS was completed and ready to go live in September 2006. On September 1, the Sirsi ILS was taken offline, and by September 5 Evergreen was up and running. Due to the success of Evergreen it was awarded the Mellon Award for Technology Collaboration in 2007 by the Andrew W. Mellon Foundation.

Since its initial release, Evergreen is now used in over 1,800 libraries around the world, including the highest-circulating library in the United States, the King County Library System.

== List of library systems within PINES ==
- Athens Regional Library System
- Augusta-Richmond County Public Library System
- Azalea Regional Library System
- Bartram Trail Regional Library System
- Brooks County Public Library
- Catoosa County Library
- Chattooga County Library System
- Cherokee Regional Library System
- Chestatee Regional Library System
- Clayton County Library System
- Coastal Plain Regional Library System
- Conyers-Rockdale Library System
- De Soto Trail Regional Library System
- Dougherty County Public Library
- Elbert County Public Library
- Flint River Regional Library System
- Greater Clarks Hill Regional Library System
- Hall County Library System
- Hart County Library
- Henry County Library System
- Houston County Public Library System
- Jefferson County Library System
- Kinchafoonee Regional Library System
- Lake Blackshear Regional Library System
- Lee County Library
- Live Oak Public Libraries
- Marshes of Glynn Libraries
- Middle Georgia Regional Library System
- Moultrie-Colquitt County Library System
- Mountain Regional Library System
- Newton County Library System
- Northeast Georgia Regional Library System
- Northwest Georgia Regional Library System
- Ocmulgee Regional Library System
- Oconee Regional Library System
- Ohoopee Regional Library System
- Okefenokee Regional Library System
- Peach Public Libraries
- Piedmont Regional Library System
- Pine Mountain Regional Library System
- Roddenbery Memorial Library
- Sara Hightower Regional Library System
- Satilla Regional Library System
- Screven-Jenkins Regional Library System
- South Georgia Regional Library
- Southwest Georgia Regional Library
- Statesboro Regional Public Libraries
- Thomas County Public Library System
- Three Rivers Regional Library System
- Troup-Harris Regional Library
- Twin Lakes Library System
- West Georgia Regional Library
- Worth County Library System

== See also ==
There are several library systems in Georgia outside of the PINES system. Most of those are in the Atlanta metropolitan area, but the library systems of the Columbus metropolitan area are also outside of the PINES system. In February 2018, the Live Oak Public Libraries of the Savannah metropolitan area joined the PINES consortium.

- List of public library systems in Georgia
