= Annie L. McPheeters =

American librarian and activist

- Annie McPheeters
- Born: Annie Lou Watters; February 22, 1908; Berwin, Georgia, U.S.
- Died: December 23, 1994 (aged 86)

Annie Lou McPheeters (née Watters) (February 22, 1908 – December 23, 1994) was an African American librarian and civil rights activist. She was known for starting the Negro History Collection at the Auburn Carnegie Library, in Atlanta Georgia. The Atlanta-Fulton Public Library System named the Washington Park/Annie L. McPheeters Branch Library in honor of her work.

In 1936 she became the librarian of the Auburn Carnegie Library, in Atlanta GA, where she started the Negro History Collection and was also instrumental in the creation of educational programs. She was the head librarian at that library in the 1930s and 1940s.

She was the first African-American professional librarian with the Atlanta Public Library system, working within the Negro Department with two other librarians beginning in 1949. She oversaw three segregated library branches—Auburn, University Homes and West Hunter. In the 1950s those branches led educational programs for their Black patrons on topics such as politics and government, teaching their patrons how to use voting machines, and running discussion programs about civics.

She interacted with library patrons such as a young Martin Luther King Jr. and Maynard Jackson. McPheeters personally campaigned for library desegregation in Atlanta, which was finally achieved in 1959.

From 1966 to 1975, she worked as a librarian at Georgia State University, making her the first African-American faculty member at that school. From 1977 to 1979 she worked as a consultant at Pergamon Press.

== Early life and education ==
McPheeters was born on February 22, 1908, in Berwin, Georgia to Josephine (Dozier) Watters and William A. Watters. She grew up in Rome, Georgia and then moved to Atlanta for high school and college. Her undergraduate education was at Clark Atlanta University (English Literature, 1929) and Hampton University (Library Science, 1933), and in 1947 she completed a postgraduate degree in Library Science at Columbia University.

In 1940 she married Alphonso McPheeters, a professor of education at Clark University. She was a member of the Helen A. Whiting Society, the Utopian Literary Club, and the Alpha Kappa Alpha sorority. She died on December 23, 1994. Her papers are housed in the Auburn Avenue Research Library.

== Bibliography ==
- An Educational Program For The Blind (1944)
- Library Eyes For The Blind (1944)
- Atlanta Branch Aids Negro Group (1949)
- Negro Progress In Atlanta, Georgia, 1950-1960
- Scarcity Of Children's Librarians In Public Libraries (1960)
- Negro Progress In Atlanta, Georgia, 1961-1970 (1974)
- McPheeters, Annie L. (1988). Library Service in Black and White: Some Personal Recollections, 1921–1980. Foreword by Jack Dalton. Metuchen, NJ: Scarecrow Press. ISBN 0810821044. LCCN 88001979.
