= Northeast Georgia Regional Library System =

Library System in Georgia, United States

- Location: Northeast Georgia
- Established: 1951
- Branches: 6 branches, 1 processing center

Collection
- Size: 224,479 (2016)

Access and use
- Circulation: 409,714 (2016)
- Population served: 115,332 (2016)
- Members: 35,743 (2016)

Other information
- Budget: $488,538.92 (2016)
- Director: Delana Knight
- Website: http://www.negeorgialibraries.org/

The Northeast Georgia Regional Library System (NEGRLS) is a collection of seven public libraries in the counties of Habersham, White, Rabun, and Stephens, Georgia, United States.

NEGRLS is a member of PINES, a program of the Georgia Public Library Service that covers 53 library systems in 143 counties of Georgia. Any resident in a PINES supported library system has access to over 10.6 million books in the system's circulation. The library is also serviced by GALILEO, a program of the University System of Georgia which stands for "GeorgiA LIbrary LEarning Online". This program offers residents in supported libraries access to over 100 databases indexing thousands of periodicals and scholarly journals. It also boasts over 10,000 journal titles in full text.

== History ==
=== Clarkesville Library ===
The origins of the Northeast Georgia Regional Library System began with the Clarkesville Library established in 1928. This library, as well as its sister county library (the Cornelia branch), joined alongside the Stephens County Library Program to create the Habersham-Stephens Regional Library System in 1944.

The Clarkesville library served as the regional headquarters for the system from 1928 until 2009, when it was replaced by the general NEGRLS processing center.

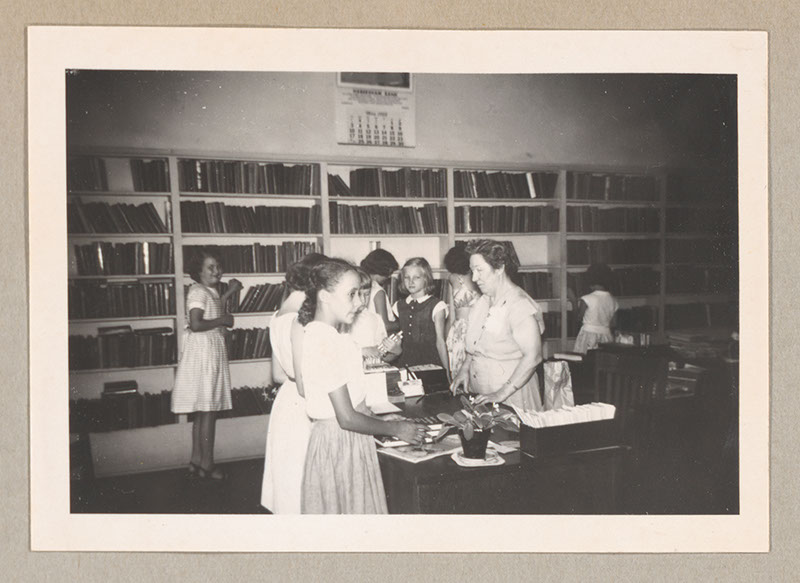
Photograph of a group of girls using the library, Clarkesville, 1953

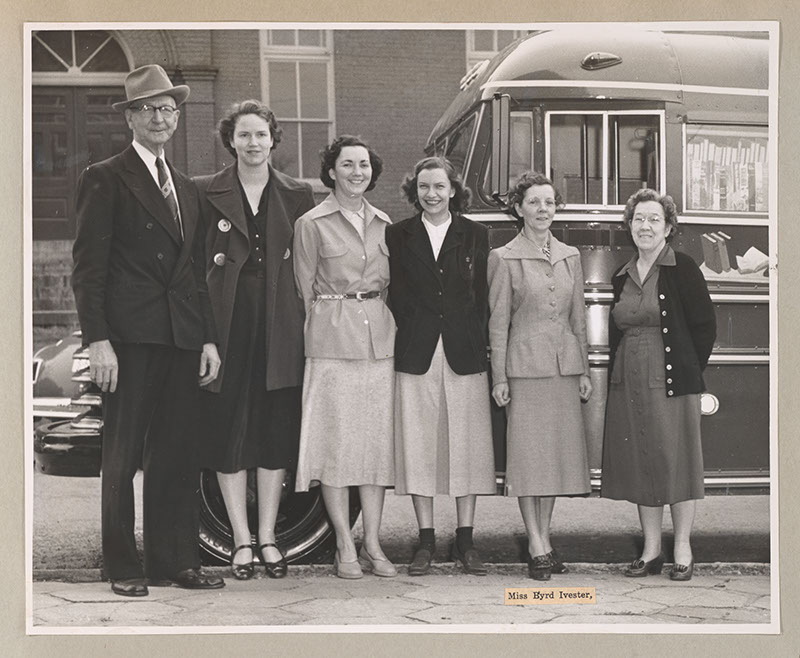
Photograph of a man and five women standing in front of a bookmobile, Clarkesville, 1953

=== Stephens County Library ===
The next library created in the current region was the Toccoa-Stephens County Library. It was established by the Works Progress Administration and first sponsored by the Toccoa Woman's Club on May 1, 1937. Initially the library was housed in a section of the local high school until it was moved after one year into space made available in the Woman's clubhouse. The Kiwanis Club and United Daughters of the Confederacy, as well as the Stephens County Commissioners also offered monetary support to the library in 1938, and by 1939 the WPA withdrew its involvement.

During the 1940s the library was officially designated the Toccoa-Stephens County Public Library, and in the next three years moved to three different buildings before settling down in city hall until 1956. At this point the Woman's Club offered their clubhouse as a permanent space for the library as a gift to the city which was accepted.

The library joined the greater Northeast Georgia system in 1966. During this time space became limited in the old Woman's clubhouse and a new building was conceived. Dedicated in May 1970 the new $240,000 library more than doubled the space of the old library. Another addition in 1988 doubled the floor space of the library again.

=== White County ===
The White County library joined in 1951, and with the introduction of White County the name of the library system was changed to its present form. In 1956 Rabun County joined the system, and a decade later, in 1966, the City of Toccoa joined. The current system has been made up of the same libraries since these last two additions.

== Branches ==
| Name | Address |
|---|---|
| Clarkesville/Habersham County Library | 178 East Green Street, Clarkesville, Georgia 30523 |
| Cornelia/Habersham County Public Library | 301 North Main Street, Cornelia, Georgia 30531 |
| Rabun County Public Library | 73 Jo Dotson Circle, P.O. Box 330, Clayton, Georgia 30525 |
| Toccoa/Stephens County Public Library | 53 West Savannah Street, P.O. Box Drawer L, Toccoa, Georgia 30577 |
| White County Public Library (Cleveland Branch) | 10 Colonial Drive, P.O. Box 657, Cleveland, Georgia 30528 |
| White County Public Library (Helen Branch) | 90 Pete's Park Road, P.O. Box 1088, Helen, Georgia 30545 |
| Northeast Georgia Regional Library System Administrative Offices/Processing Center | 204 Ellison Street, Suites E & F |

== Library systems in neighboring counties ==
- Mountain Regional Library System to the east
- Chestatee Regional Library System to the east
- Hall County Library System to the south east
- Piedmont Regional Library System to the south
- Athens Regional Library System to the south
