= Lavonia Carnegie Library =

Historic library in Georgia, US

- U.S. National Register of Historic Places
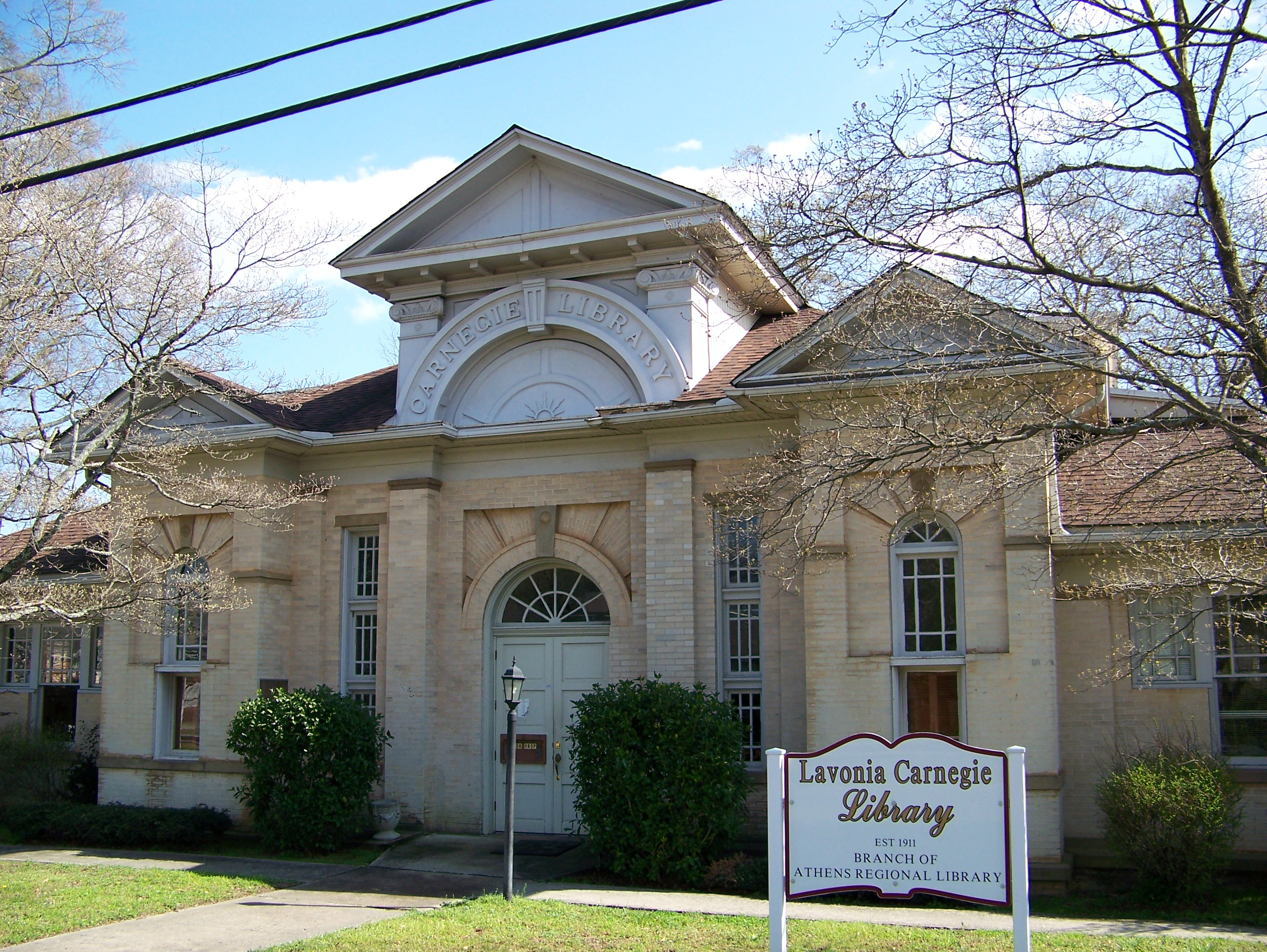

- Location within Georgia Location within the United States
- Location: 28 Hartwell Rd., Lavonia, Georgia 30553
- Coordinates: 34°26′5″N 83°6′14″W
- Area: less than one acre
- Built: 1911
- Architectural style: Renaissance Revival
- MPS: Lavonia MRA
- NRHP reference No.: 83000211
- Added to NRHP: September 1, 1983

The Lavonia Carnegie Library is a historic library building at 28 Hartwell Road in Lavonia, Georgia. It was built in 1911 with funding support from Andrew Carnegie, and is the most architecturally sophisticated building in the small community. It is a single-story buff brick building with Renaissance Revival styling. Founded in 1904 to be the Lavonia public library, it was merged as a branch of the Athens Regional Library System.

The building was listed on the National Register of Historic Places in 1983.

== See also ==
- National Register of Historic Places listings in Franklin County, Georgia
- List of Carnegie libraries in Georgia
