= Fulton County Library System =

Library system in Georgia, US

Coordinates: 33.75753°N 84.388237°W

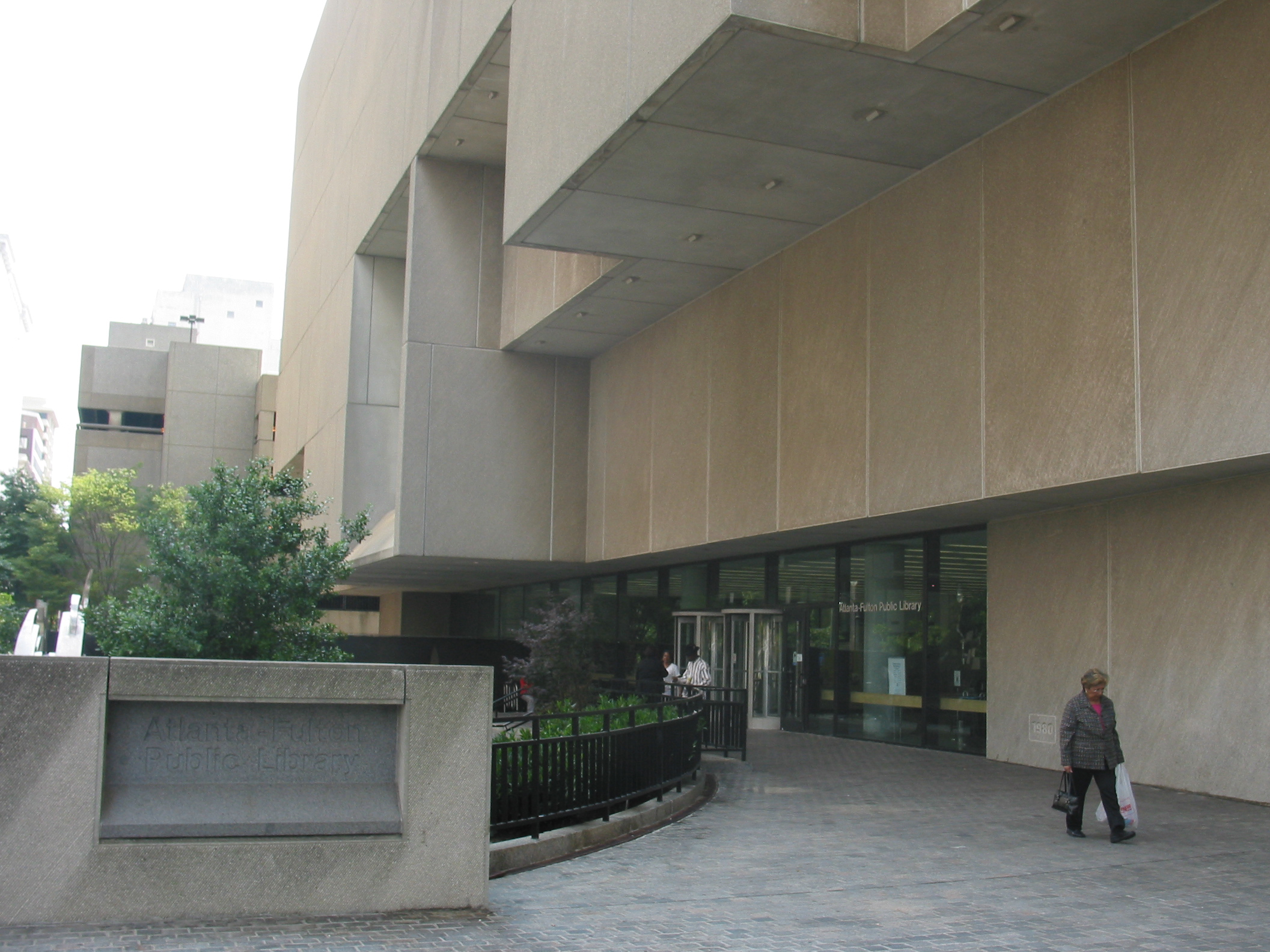
- Atlanta Central Library
- Location: Atlanta, Georgia
- Established: 1902; 124 years ago
- Branches: 34

Collection
- Size: 2,790,177 (2017)

Access and use
- Circulation: 2,855,142 (2017)
- Population served: 1,052,908 (2017)
- Members: 626,650 (2017)

Other information
- Director: Gayle H. Holloman
- Website: www.fulcolibrary.org

The Fulton County Library System is a network of public libraries serving the City of Atlanta and Fulton County, both in the U.S. state of Georgia. The system is administered by Fulton County. The system is composed of the Atlanta Central Library in Downtown Atlanta, which serves as the library headquarters, as well as the Auburn Avenue Research Library on African American Culture and History, and 33 branch libraries.

== History ==
=== The Young Men's Library Association ===
The origins of the public library system lie in the Young Men's Library Association (YMLA), a subscription library system established in 1867. The YMLA was open to the public, but only paying members could check out books. Membership was restricted to white men until 1873 when white women were allowed to join. The YMLA system remained the de facto library system of the city for the rest of the century. During the 1890s, however, the YMLA, Andrew Carnegie, and the City of Atlanta, started to work out the details of a new public library in Atlanta. In 1897 Walter M. Kelly, Andrew Carnegie's business manager for Southern affairs joined the board of the YMLA and advocated for the construction of a public library because the YMLA could not serve Atlanta's growing population.

=== The Carnegie Library ===
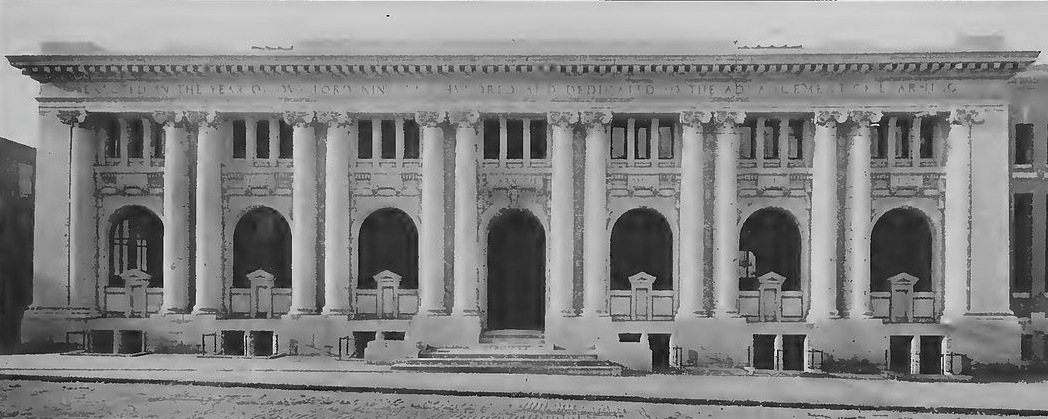
Carnegie Library (1902–1977)

On March 4, 1902, the first public library, the Ackerman & Ross-designed Carnegie Library, opened on the site of the current Central Library. When the library opened, only the basement, the stacks, and the children's room were completed. The Carnegie Library remained the main library of the system for most of the century. The library was renovated in 1950 and 1966 through city bond funding. Before 1950 the system was referred to as the Carnegie Library, but to commemorate the renovation of the central Carnegie Library the system was renamed the Atlanta Public Library in 1950. It was in this building that 20 gay men were arrested following a police stakeout in September 1953, an event known as the Atlanta Public Library perversion case. In 1977 the Carnegie Library was torn down to make way for the current Central Library. However, the building's architectural bays were preserved, and used to create the Carnegie Education Pavilion, a monument to higher education in Atlanta.

=== Expansion of the library system ===
The Carnegie Library was so successful that within a year after the opening of the library, Carnegie suggested he would give more money to open branch libraries. In 1906 Carnegie formally offered $30,000 for the construction of two branch libraries, as long as the city provided a site and arranged financial support for the library. The Anne Wallace Library, named in honor of the first Carnegie Library librarian, opened in 1909 on the corner of Luckie Street and Merritts Avenue in Northwest Atlanta. Many new branch libraries followed in the years to come. The Ragsdale branch, located in Oakland City, opened in 1912, and in 1913 the Uncle Remus Branch opened in the West End home of Joel Chandler Harris. Over the next century the library system has expanded from four branches in 1913 to the 34 branches operating today. By 1924 the library system had eight branches throughout the city, and by 1967 the system had 19 branches.

=== City–county relationship ===
In the first decades of the library system service was maintained for Atlanta residents only, and as a result Fulton County was left without library service. Using Works Progress Administration and city funds, the City of Atlanta and the Fulton County Board of Commissioners signed a contract in 1935 to provide library coverage throughout the county. In 1982, however, Georgia passed a constitutional amendment that allowed the city to transfer control of the system to the county, and in 1983 the system was turned over the county control. To reflect the change in control the system was renamed the Atlanta–Fulton Public Library System.

=== Black Atlantans and the public library ===
When the Carnegie Library opened in 1902, blacks were excluded from the library. Activist W. E. B. Du Bois led an unsuccessful campaign for black representation and equal use of the library, or at the very least a branch library for blacks, but the library board rebuffed his efforts. Carnegie had offered funds for a black branch library, but the library system did not use the money until 1921 when Tommie Dora Barker, the Director of the Carnegie Library School, opened the Auburn Avenue Branch Library, the first branch library for blacks, in the Sweet Auburn neighborhood. During segregation two other libraries were opened for the use of blacks. After opening its first branches for African Americans in the 1920's the APL began to employ black female librarians like Annie L. McPheeters. In 1959, Irene Dobbs Jackson, the mother of future Atlanta mayor Maynard Jackson requested a library card for the central library. After days of public furor, the library board voted to allow blacks full access to the library on May 19, 1959. Between 1966 and 1973 the library staff was desegregated.

=== 2008 bond referendum ===
In 2008 Fulton County voters approved a $275 million library bond referendum, which provides money for renovation and construction of library facilities in Fulton County. The plan includes money for eight new libraries, a new central library, expansions of two libraries, and renovations of 23 branch libraries. Five 25,000-square-foot (2,300 m^{2}) libraries will be built in Alpharetta, Milton, Northwest Atlanta, Wolf Creek, and Stewart-Lakewood. The Alpharetta and Stewart-Lakewood libraries will replace existing 10,000-square-foot (930 m^{2}) libraries, the Northwest Atlanta library will replace three small branch libraries, and the Milton and Wolf Creek libraries will be completely new. A new 10,000-square-foot (930 m^{2}) library will be built in Palmetto/Chattahoochee Hill County, and two new 15,000-square-foot (1,400 m^{2}) libraries will be built in Southeast Atlanta and East Roswell. The Southeast Atlanta library will replace three small branch libraries. In the original Library Facility Master Plan $34 million was allocated to fully restore and upgrade the site. In the final referendum, however, $84 million was provided for the construction of a new 300,000-square-foot (28,000 m^{2}) central library. Finally, the Auburn Avenue Research Library and the South Fulton branch library will be expanded.

== Central Library ==
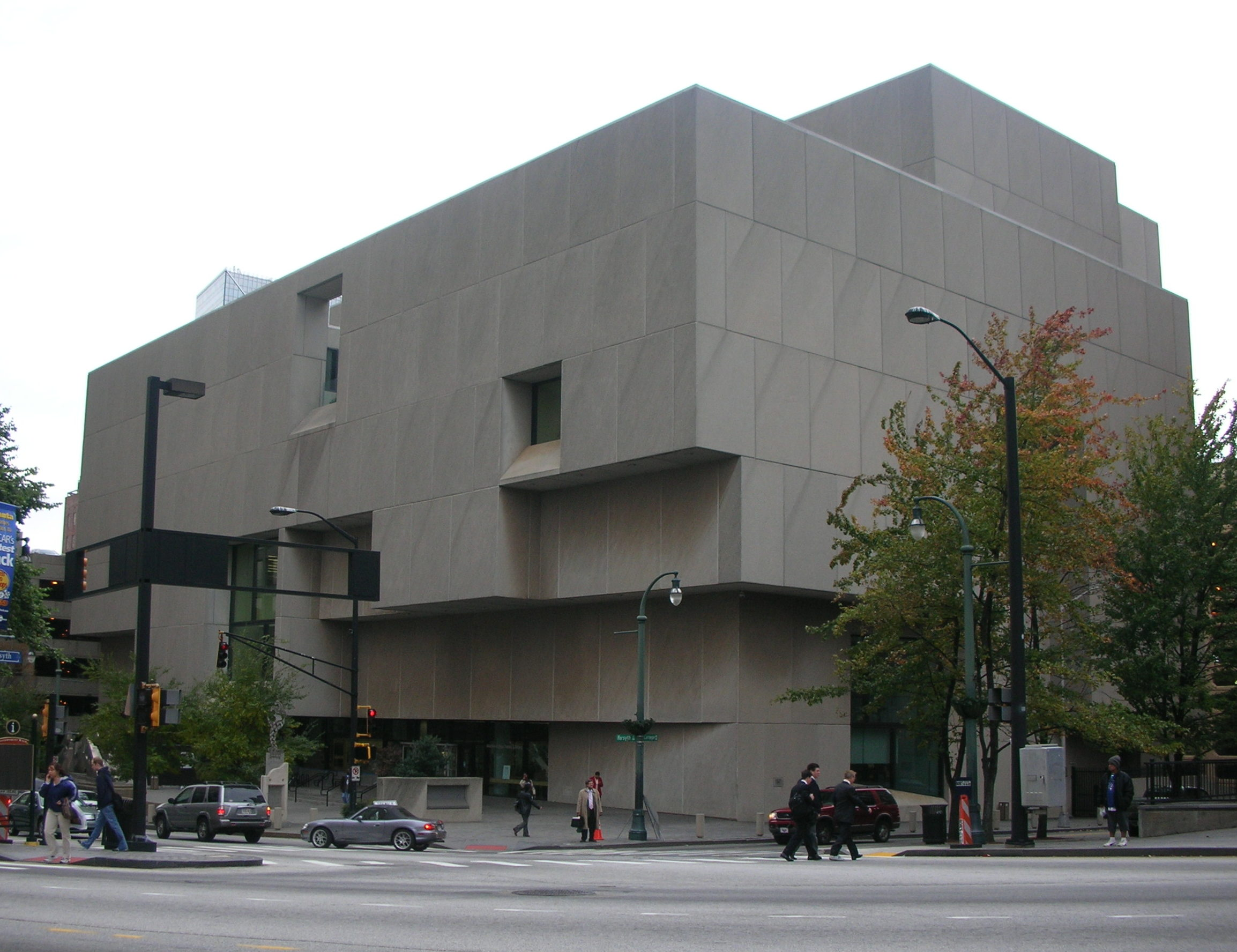
The Central Library

The Central Library in Downtown Atlanta serves as the headquarters of the library system. Completed in 1980, it was the last building to be designed by Bauhaus-movement architect Marcel Breuer. The building, designed in the brutalist architectural style, is considered a "masterpiece" by architectural experts, such as Barry Bergdoll, the Chief Architectural Curator of the Museum of Modern Art, and is closely related to the Whitney Museum of Art building at 945 Madison Avenue.

== Branches ==
=== Roswell ===
The Roswell Branch begun in 1946 when volunteers would make weekly trips to the Atlanta Central Library. In 1955, Arthur W Smith purchased one of the historic "Bricks" apartments in Roswell and the collection was moved there and referred to as the Carnegie Library Deposit at Roswell because all of the books were still being borrowed from the Central Library. It was not until 1965 that the Roswell Library became a full fledged branch with its own collection. Today the library building is named after Arthur W Smith.

=== Cleveland Avenue ===
Initially opened in 1992. In 2001 the library was renamed the Cleveland Avenue-Roy Lyndell Yancey, Sr. Branch Library. The Cleveland Avenue Branch Library is the first ever Fulton County Government roof top solar installation facility.

=== Full list ===
- Adams Park Branch
- Adamsville–Collier Heights Branch
- Alpharetta Branch
- Auburn Avenue Research Library
- Buckhead Branch
- Cascade Branch
- Cleveland Avenue Branch
- College Park Branch
- Dogwood Branch
- East Atlanta Branch
- East Point Branch
- East Roswell Branch
- Fairburn Branch
- Gladys S. Dennard Library at South Fulton
- Hapeville Branch
- Kirkwood Branch
- Louise Watley Library at Southeast Atlanta
- Martin Luther King Jr., Branch
- Mechanicsville Branch
- Metropolitan Branch
- Milton Branch
- Northeast/Spruill Oaks Branch
- Northside Branch
- Northwest Branch at Scotts Crossing
- Ocee Branch
- Palmetto Branch
- Peachtree Branch
- Ponce de Leon Branch
- Roswell Branch
- Sandy Springs Branch
- South Fulton Branch
- Southeast Atlanta Branch
- Washington Park Branch
- West End Branch
- Wolf Creek Branch

== Library systems in neighboring counties ==
- West Georgia Regional Library to the west
- Cobb County Public Library System to the west
- Sequoyah Regional Library System to the northwest
- Forsyth County Public Library to the northeast
- Gwinnett County Public Library to the east
- DeKalb County Public Library to the east
- Clayton County Library System to the southeast
- Flint River Regional Library System to the south
- Coweta Public Library System to the south
