= Chestatee Regional Library System =

Public library system in Georgia, United States

- Location: Dawson and Lumpkin Counties
- Established: 1953
- Branches: 2 branches

Collection
- Size: 133,452 (2016)

Access and use
- Circulation: 247,237 (2016)
- Population served: 56,075 (2016)
- Members: 19,872 (2016)

Other information
- Director: Leslie Clark
- Website: http://chestateelibrary.org/

The Chestatee Regional Library System (CRLS) is a system of two public libraries serving the counties of Dawson County, and Lumpkin County, Georgia, United States. Their regional headquarters are located at the Lumpkin County branch, in the city of Dahlonega.

CRLS is a member of PINES, a program of the Georgia Public Library Service that covers 53 library systems in 143 counties of Georgia. Any resident in a PINES supported library system has access to over 10.6 million books in the system's circulation. The library is also serviced by GALILEO, a program of the University System of Georgia which stands for "GeorgiA LIbrary LEarning Online". This program offers residents in supported libraries access to over 100 databases indexing thousands of periodicals and scholarly journals. It also boasts over 10,000 journal titles in full text.

== History ==
The Chestatee Regional Library System was first founded in 1953 as a two-county regional library system serving the communities of Hall and Lumpkin Counties. In 1994, in an effort to mutually expand the resources of their libraries, Dawson County joined with Hall and Lumpkin to make the library system a tri-county consortium. However, shortly thereafter in 1997, Hall County withdrew from the system and began their own self-sufficient library system, the Hall County Library System made up of its own five branches.

The satellite extension of the Dawson County branch closed its doors on December 31, 2024.

== Branches ==
Name	Address	Website
Dawson County Library	342 Allen Street, Dawsonville, GA 30534	http://chestateelibrary.org/dawson-county-library/
Lumpkin County Library	56 Mechanicsville Road, Dahlonega, GA 30533	http://chestateelibrary.org/lumpkin-county-library/

== Library systems in neighboring counties ==
- Mountain Regional Library System to the north
- Northeast Georgia Regional Library System to the east
- Hall County Library System to the south east
- Forsyth County Public Library to the south
- Sequoyah Regional Library System to the west
