= Coweta Public Library System =

Group of public libraries in Georgia, US

- Location: Coweta County, Georgia
- Branches: 4

Collection
- Size: 188,634

Access and use
- Circulation: 515,819 (2016)
- Population served: 141,369 (2016)
- Members: 87,507 (2016)

Other information
- Director: Jimmy Bass
- Website: http://cowt.ent.sirsi.net/

The Coweta Public Library System (CPLS) is a group of four public libraries in Coweta County, Georgia, United States. The branches serve the towns of Grantville, Newnan, and Senoia.

The Coweta County Public Library uses the interlibrary loan system to share books between its branches. Members of the county library may check out and return books to any location and have access to over 180,000 books in the library collection. The loaning of books can be completed through a physical or digitized format through the reading apps Libby and Overdrive.

== History ==
The first public library in Coweta County was a Carnegie library funded by industrialist Andrew Carnegie in 1901. Accordingly, a teenager in the town of Newnan wrote to Carnegie requesting funds for a public library, and he provided a grant for $10,000 with the condition that the town continue to pay for the running of the library after construction. Construction began on August 4, 1903, and concluded the following year.

In 1987 the Carnegie library was replaced by a new building constructed on Hospital Road in Newnan. This new branch, the A. Mitchell Powell Jr. Library, was constructed to modernize the city library and provide more space for book stacks, meeting areas, and public computers.

By 2007 the original Carnegie library was again vacant and a movement grew to bring the library back to the downtown area. By 2009, after renovations to the building, the Carnegie library was re-purposed as a meeting area and pseudo-library with a non-circulating collection of books, magazines, and newspapers.

== Branches ==
Name	Address
Central Library	85 Literary Lane, Newnan, GA 30265
A. Mitchell Powell Jr. Branch	25 Hospital Road, Newnan, GA 30263
Grantville Branch	100 Park Drive, Grantville, GA 30220
Senoia Branch	148 Pylant Street, Senoia, GA 30276

== Library systems in neighboring counties ==
- Fulton County Library System to the north
- West Georgia Regional Library to the northwest
- Flint River Regional Library System to the east
- Pine Mountain Regional Library System to the south
- Troup-Harris Regional Library to the southwest
