= Cherokee Regional Library System =

Library system in Georgia, United States

- Location: Northwest Georgia
- Branches: 4

Collection
- Size: 208,942 (2020)

Access and use
- Circulation: 192122 (2020)
- Population served: 85,772 (2020)
- Members: 27,749 (2020)

Other information
- Budget: $600,988 (2016)
- Director: Lecia Eubanks
- Website: http://www.chrl.org

The Cherokee Regional Library System (CRLS) is a public library system consisting of four libraries in the counties of Walker and Dade, Georgia. The central library, the Lafayette-Walker County Public Library, is located in LaFayette, Georgia.

CRLS is a member of PINES, a public library network of 281 libraries in 140 counties throughout Georgia. Any resident of Georgia may receive a PINES library card which allows them access to any of the 8 million books in its collection across the state. The library is also associated with GALILEO, Georgia's ‘virtual library’ which facilitates online access to over 100 databases (including magazine articles and online books) for researchers and students on a wide variety of topics. Each branch of the library also hosts their own Genealogy and Local History Room for patrons.

== History ==
=== Rossville Public Library ===
The Rossville Public Library was organized in 1942 as a product of the Works Progress Administration. Upon completion of the library, neighboring LaFayette, Georgia's library board approached the library in Rossville to request a regional library system be constructed between the two branches. This was the first iteration of the Cherokee Regional Library System.

== Branches ==
Name	Address	Website
Chickamuga Public Library	306 Cove Road, Chickamauga, GA 30707	http://www.chrl.org/chickamauga-public-library/
Dade County Public Library	102 Court Street, Trenton GA, 30752	http://www.chrl.org/dade-county-public-library/
Lafayette-Walker County Public Library	305 S. Duke Street, LaFayette GA, 30728	http://www.chrl.org/lafayette-walker-county-public-library/
Rossville Public Library	504 McFarland Avenue, Rossville GA, 30741	http://www.chrl.org/rossville-public-library/

== Library systems in neighboring counties ==
- Chattooga County Library System to the south.
- Northwest Georgia Regional Library System to the east.
- Catoosa County Library to the east.
