= Bartow County Library System =

Public library in Bartow County, Georgia

Coordinates: 34.163841°N 84.805542°W

- Location: Bartow County, Georgia
- Established: 1981
- Branches: 3

Collection
- Size: 170,980 (2020)

Access and use
- Circulation: 319,338 (2020)
- Population served: 110,771 (2020)
- Members: 52,897 (2020)

Other information
- Director: Radha Ashok
- Employees: 10
- Website: https://www.bartowlibrary.org

The Bartow County Library System (BCLS) is the public library system of Bartow County, Georgia, United States. It consists of three branches serving a population of 103,000 people. The main branch is located in Cartersville, while supplementary branches are present in Adairsville and Euharlee.

== History ==
The Bartow County Library System had its beginnings in 1896 as a library organization started by the Cherokee Women's Club of Bartow County. In 1903 a building was funded and constructed to be used as the library, and was located on Public Square. This first library was named the Mary Munford Memorial Library of the Cherokee Club after its first library chairman, who died while the library was being built.

In 1932 the library was made public to the citizens of Cartersville.

By the 1960s the Mary Munford library was falling into disrepair. The town acquired the ownership of the library and a new board took over the day-to-day running of the library. During this time the library joined a consortium with two other counties to create the Tri-County Library system. This included Bartow County, Floyd County, and Polk County.

In 1980 the town took complete control over the library building and erected their new courthouse on the property. The library moved to its current location on West Main Street in Cartersville, and in the following year left the Tri-County Library System.

In 2004 the library began its first expansion in an effort to rapidly increase the floor space from 17,333 to 44,455 square feet. This was done in the interest of helping the community at a greater capacity. During this time two more locations were established: Adairsville and Euharlee in 2009.

== Branches ==
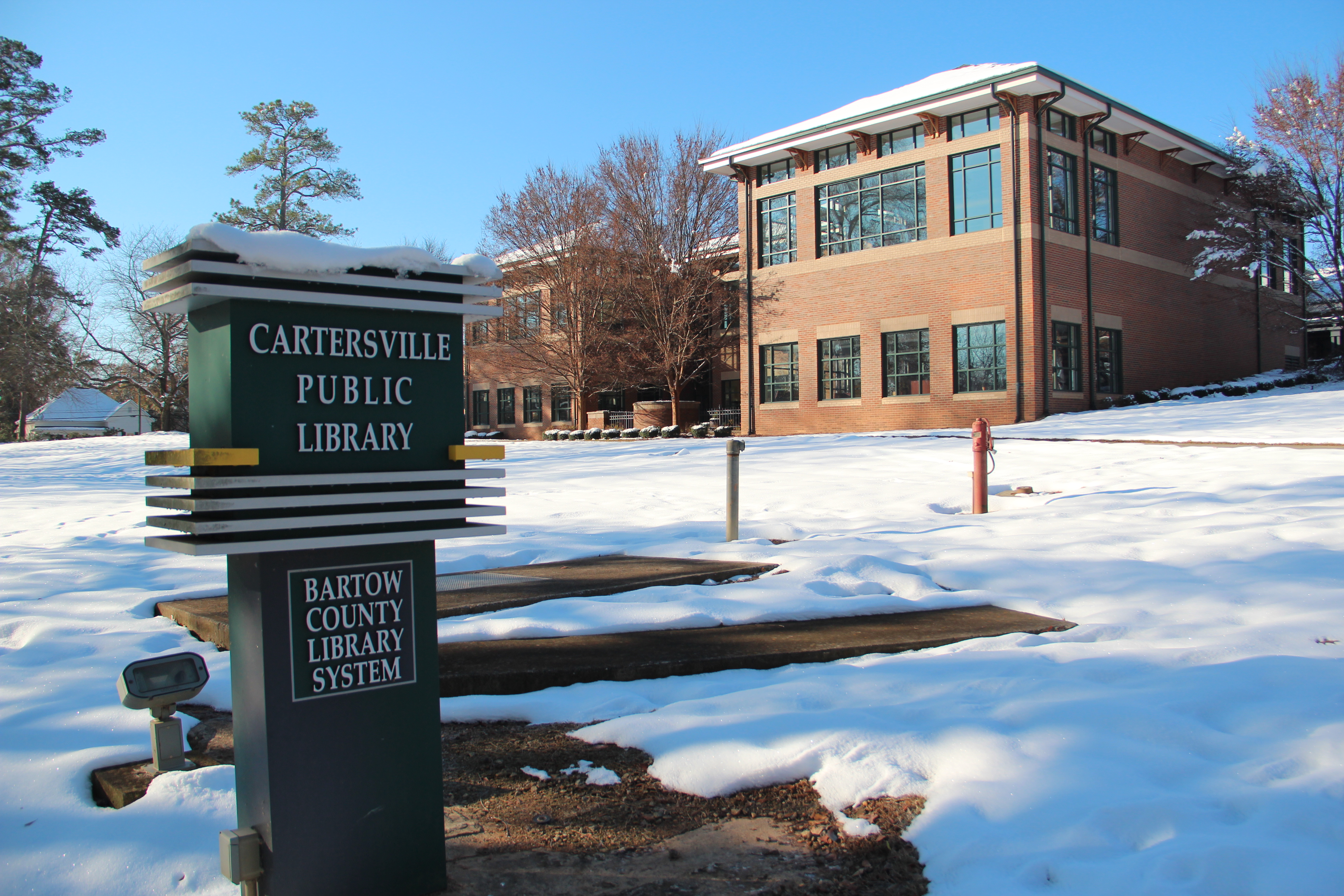
Cartersville Public Library

Name	Address
Adairsville Public Library	202 North Main Street, Adairsville, GA 30103
Cartersville Public Library	429 West Main Street, Cartersville, GA 30120
Emmie Nelson Public Library	116 Covered Bridge Road, Euharlee, GA 30120

== Library systems in neighboring counties ==
- Cobb County Public Library System to the southeast
- West Georgia Regional Library System to the south
- Sequoyah Regional Library System to the east
- Sara Hightower Regional Library System to the west
- Northwest Georgia Regional Library System to the north
