= Forsyth County Public Library =

- Location: Forsyth County, Georgia
- Established: 1938
- Branches: 5

Collection
- Size: 441,639 (2020)

Access and use
- Circulation: 2,331,969 (2020)
- Population served: 252,507 (2020)
- Members: 80,824 (2020)

Other information
- Budget: $6,768,303 (2017)
- Director: Adrianne Junius
- Website: https://www.forsythpl.org

The Forsyth County Public Library (FCPL) is a consortium of five public libraries in Forsyth County, Georgia, United States. Four branches are located in the county seat of Cumming and one branch is located in Alpharetta.

The Forsyth County Public Library as of 2015 had the highest circulation per capita in the state of Georgia. The Sharon Forks branch was recognized as the busiest library in the state, with a circulation of over one million materials.

== History ==
=== Early years: Gwinnett–Forsyth Regional Library ===
The first library in Forsyth County was run out of the home of Laura Hockenhull, who at the time owned a private library and decided to open it up to the public. By 1938 the Works Progress Administration (WPA) of Forsyth opened the first formal county library with a collection of just over 600 volumes. With funding from the WPA, this collection of books was housed throughout the county, largely on a bookmobile that covered 20 routes through the county.

In 1956, in an effort to consolidate resources, Forsyth and Gwinnett County created a joint library system named the Gwinnett–Forsyth Regional Library System. Their partnership drastically increased the number of volumes available in the system as Gwinnett County housed a half-dozen library locations while the Forsyth library collections were spread out among various buildings.

Finally, in 1966 a formal location for library use was constructed in Forsyth County. Funding came from the federal Library Services and Construction Act, allowing for a centralized location for most of the county's books. By this time, due to the county's proximity to Atlanta, the population in Forsyth and nearby counties was booming. A bond referendum, passed in 1988, allocated $2.1 million for the improvement of the county libraries, and the state of Georgia matched this with a $2 million grant for construction of a new building which opened in 1992.

In 1995, Gwinnett County decided to dissolve the Gwinnett–Forsyth Regional Library System as their population and accommodations had grown to a point of independence.

=== Forsyth County Public Library ===
The following year, 1996, as a response to the split from Gwinnett county, Forsyth county passed a special-purpose local-option sales tax (SPLOST) in order to raise funds to build a new library branch. This was repeated in 1998 to open the Sharon Forks Branch in 2000.

In 2010 a third location, the Hampton Park Library was opened. In 2013 the Post Road Library opened, marking FCPL's fourth location. In 2017, SPLOST funds were used to renovate the Sharon Forks Library. In 2025 a fifth location, the Denmark Library, was opened.

== Branches ==
Name	Address	Opened
Cumming Library	585 Dahlonega Street, Cumming, GA 30040	1990
Denmark Library	530 Fowler Road, Alpharetta, GA 30005	2025
Hampton Park Library	5345 Settingdown Road, Cumming, GA 30041	2010
Post Road Library	5010 Post Road, Cumming, GA 30040	2013
Sharon Forks Library	2820 Old Atlanta Road, Cumming, GA 30041	2000

== Library systems in neighboring counties ==
- Chestatee Regional Library System to the north
- Sequoyah Regional Library System to the west
- Fulton County Library System to the southwest
- Gwinnett County Public Library to the south
- Hall County Library System to the east
