= Gwinnett County Public Library =

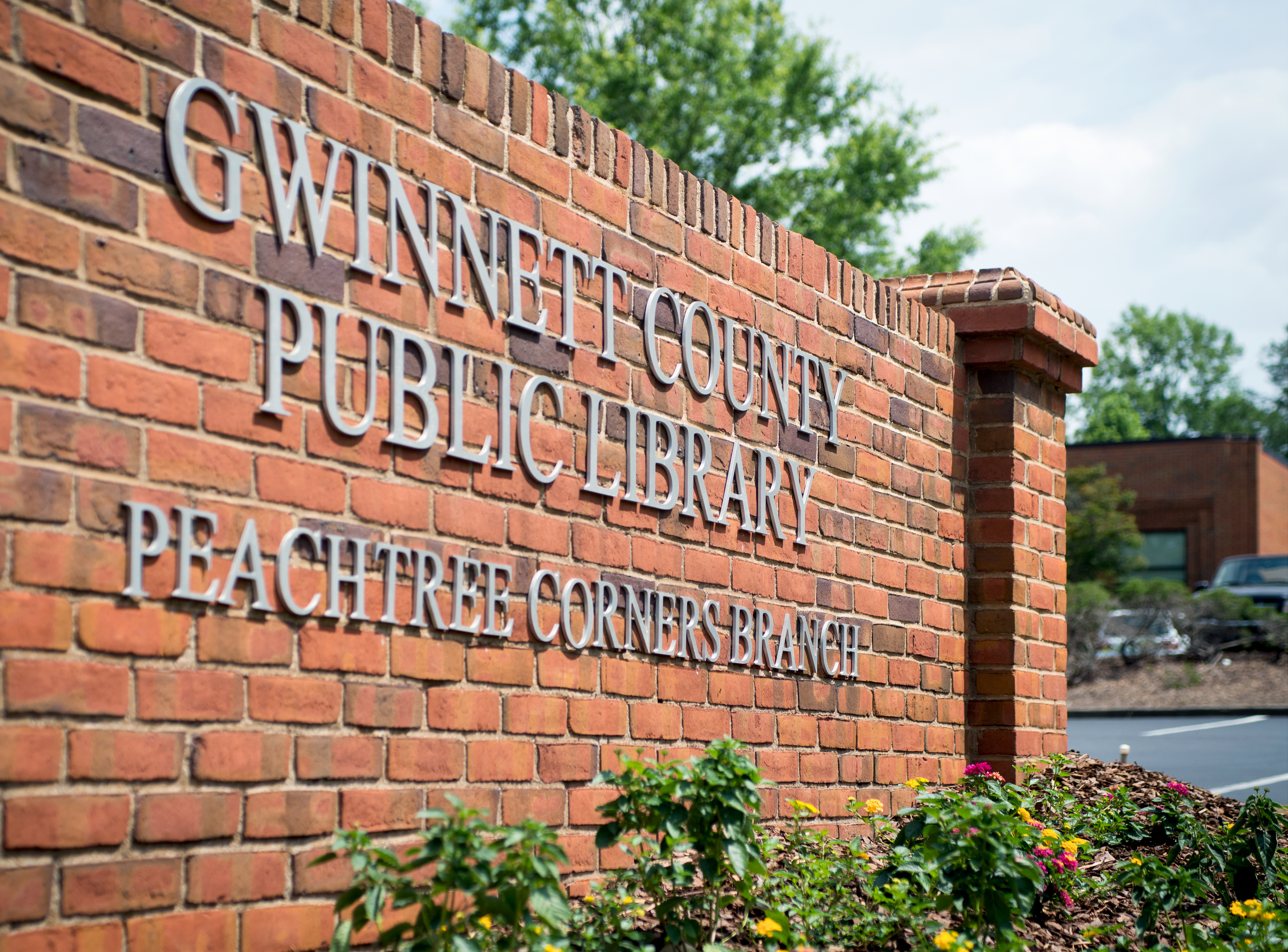
- Peachtree Corners Library
- 33.942297°N 84.014682°W
- Location: Gwinnett County, GA
- Established: 1936
- Branches: 15

Collection
- Size: 839,728 (2016)

Access and use
- Circulation: 3,925,310 (2025)
- Population served: 1,037,017 (2026)
- Members: 461,000 (2016)

Other information
- Budget: $31,988,810 (2026)
- Director: Charles Pace
- Website: http://www.gwinnettpl.org/

The Gwinnett County Public Library is located in unincorporated Gwinnett County, Georgia, United States, northeast of Atlanta. The library currently has 15 branches throughout the county and employs an interlibrary loan system for those with a valid library card.

In 2000 the Gwinnett County Public Library won the Library of the Year award. In 2009 it won the John Cotton Dana Award, which is the most prestigious of all library awards in the field of public relations and marketing. This library system has the highest amounts of material circulation out of all libraries in Georgia.

== History ==
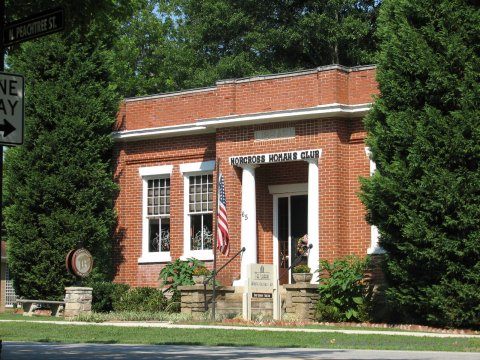
The Norcross Women's Club

The first library in the Gwinnett County region was the Norcross library, established in 1907 by the Norcross Woman's Club. Following this, in 1935, the Lawrenceville PTA began the Lawrenceville Public Library in City Hall, which was renamed to the Gwinnett County Library the following year.

In 1956, in an effort to consolidate resources with nearby Forsyth County, the two library systems agreed to form a joint venture named the Gwinnett-Forsyth Regional Library. During this time Gwinnett County opened the Lake Lanier Regional Library in Buford, and libraries in Snellville and Mountain Park.

From 1958 to 1967, the board of the Gwinnett County Library oversaw the Mack Haygood Library, a segregated branch for Black residents.

As the Atlanta metropolitan region began to fill out, Gwinnett and the surrounding counties saw a huge influx of residents, and therefore a much greater need to expand their library services. In 1986 a bond referendum allowed for each of the seven existing branches to be updated, and also allocated funds for the construction of an eighth branch at Peachtree Corners. Following suit not long after, Forsyth County received monies to refurbish their libraries and add a location of their own.

With the increasing amount of branches in the Gwinnett-Forsyth Regional Library System, Gwinnett County opted to dissolve the venture in 1996. It is at this point the Gwinnett County Public Library was formed.

In 1999, the GCPL's tenth branch opened at Collins Hill. It was also named a finalist for the Library of the Year award. In 2000 the library system was again among finalists for library of the year, and at this point won.

In 2002 the Centerville branch opened, sharing facilities with the adjacent Gwinnett County community center. A twelfth branch opened in Suwanne in 2004, and another in Dacula in 2006.

In 2005 the Grayson branch was opened, and in 2010 the Hamilton Mill branch opened as a LEED Gold certified building.

=== Censorship controversy ===
In 1997, Gwinnett County Public Library removed Nancy Friday's bestseller Women On Top from its collection after two patrons complained about its sexual content. Connie Cosby, one of the patrons, had requested that the book be made unavailable to children, and was "stunned" but "ecstatic" that library director Jo Ann Pinder removed it entirely. Women On Top became the fourth book Gwinnett County Public Library had removed from its shelves because of complaints about content.

The library's decision prompted many residents to write letters opposing and supporting the library's decision; one such letter from Sheila Blahnik, the other patron who had asked the library to remove Women On Top, called the reaction an "onslaught of media attention". Area booksellers reported increased sales of the book soon after the library removed it; a Waldenbooks manager said, "In two months the bookstore sold one copy, and all of a sudden last week we sold eight." One county resident called for Pinder and another librarian to be fired for describing the reasons for the book's removal as "editing errors and changes in library purchasing guidelines" rather than stating that it was censored because of its sexual content; other residents began shouting questions which the board did not answer, and the police were summoned.

As a result of the controversy, Gwinnett County Public Library created a "parental advisory" category for books deemed suitable only for adults, allowing parents to give consent for their minor children to check those items out. The library also created an advisory board to review the process for handling residents' complaints about library materials, and on the advice of county lawyers the library later opened those meetings to the public. Ultimately, the library made it easier to request removing books from the library, on the advice of the advisory board, because the old form had been "too complicated".

The current Collection Development Policy (updated 2023) has eliminated restricted item sections or categories, and instead encourages customers to make their own decisions on which materials to check out. In line with current American Library Association guidelines on censorship, the Gwinnett County Public Library's policy affirms the right to access materials and declares the system's adherence to the American Library Association's Freedom to Read, Freedom to View, and Library Bill of Rights. A materials reconsideration request form is available for customers who wish to challenge materials held by the library. Per the Collection Development Policy, requests for reconsideration are reviewed by the Director of Customer Experience, the Technical Services Manager, and a minimum of two degreed, professional customer service staff members. Materials are evaluated using the library's mission statement and the guidelines laid out in the Collection Development Policy. Decisions made regarded challenged works are final and any subsequent requests are subject to the standing decision.

== Branches ==
Name	Address	Opened
Buford-Sugar Hill Branch	2100 Buford Hwy, Buford, GA 30518	1989
Centerville Branch	3025 Bethany Church Road, Snellville, GA 30039	2002
Collins Hill Branch	455 Camp Perrin Road, Lawrenceville, GA 30043	1999
Dacula Branch	265 Dacula Road, Dacula, GA 30019	2006
Duluth Branch	3180 Main Street, Duluth, GA 30096	1968, 1989, 2021
Five Forks Branch	2780 Five Forks Trickum Road, Lawrenceville, GA 30044	1995
Grayson Branch	700 Grayson Parkway, Grayson, GA 30017	2006
Hamilton Mill Branch	3690 Braselton Highway, Dacula, GA 30019	2010
Lawrenceville Hooper-Renwick Themed Library	56 Neal Boulevard, Lawrenceville, GA 30046	1990, 2025
Lilburn Branch	4817 Church Street, Lilburn, GA 30047	1968, 2016
Mountain Park Branch	1210 Pounds Road SW, Lilburn, GA 30047	1987
Norcross Branch	5735 Buford Highway, Norcross, GA 30071	1990, 2021
Peachtree Corners Branch	5570 Spalding Drive, Peachtree Corners, GA 30092	1989
Snellville Branch	2245 Wisteria Drive, Snellville, GA 30078	1988, 2023
Suwanee Branch	361 Main Street, Suwanee, GA 30024	2004

== Library systems in neighboring counties ==
- Forsyth County Public Library to the north
- Hall County Library System to the northeast
- Azalea Regional Library System to the east
- Conyers-Rockdale Library System to the south
- DeKalb County Public Library to the southwest
- Fulton County Library System to the west
