= Northwest Georgia Regional Library System =

- Location: Northwest Georgia
- Established: 1921
- Branches: 3

Collection
- Size: 244,334

Access and use
- Circulation: 317,573 (2015)
- Population served: 200,915 (2015)
- Members: 30,359 (2015)

Other information
- Director: Darla Chambliss
- Website: http://ngrl.org/

The Northwest Georgia Regional Library System (NGRL) is a public library system across the Northwest Georgia counties of Gordon, Murray, and Whitfield.

NRGL participates in PINES, a public library network of 281 libraries in 140 counties throughout Georgia. Any resident of Georgia may receive a PINES library card which allows them access to any of the 8 million books in its collection across the state. The system is also a member of GALILEO, an online database for Georgian residents consisting of over 100 databases on a wide variety of topics.

== History ==
The first library constructed in the Northwest Georgia Regional Library System was the Calhoun-Gordon library which was constructed through efforts of the Calhoun Woman's Club in 1904. The next known library was constructed in 1921 in Dalton, Georgia as part of a service organized by The Dalton Woman's Club. It was originally named the Dalton Regional Library, and patrons who wished to use library services would be required to pay a small subscription fee for the first few years of its operation. The county allocated funds to allow the library to purchase books for a children's section. By 1936 the library was already boasting a circulation of over 4000 books per year.

In 1945, nearby Catoosa County Library in Catoosa County joined with the county of Dalton to create the Dalton Regional Library. The main branch of the Dalton library was moved to a new location, the W.C. Martin House in 1948. In 1957 and 1958 the Gordon County Library and Murray County Library also joined the growing system.

By 1971, Catoosa County had a second library in the system, the Fort Oglethorpe Branch Library. Bookmobile service for the region started out of the Whitfield library in 1975. Later in this decade, in 1977 the Murray County Board of Education donated land on which to build a new 4,000 square foot library for the county. The Appalachian Regional Commission provided $160,000 for the actual construction of the library which began in early 1979. On January 20, 1980 the new library was dedicated to the public.

In 1982 the Dalton Public Library left the W.C. Martin House for the recently constructed new regional headquarters. Through a special LSCA grant in 1984 an addition for a Special Collections Room was added to this new location. Another library was temporarily added to the system in 1992. The Fairmount Library Deposit, now an independent municipal library, started under the auspices of the Northwest Georgia Regional Library system who donated their time and libraries to begin this new library and organize it to the Dewey Decimal system. For a short people of time in the early 1990s this library was a part of the regional library system before it left to become independently run.

In 2008 the Catoosa County libraries left the NGRL to become their own independent library system. As a response, and in order to secure more books for their patrons, the NGRL joined the PINES network in 2010. This opened up access to almost 8 million book to the residents of the tri-county system.

== Branches ==
Name	Address	Website
Calhoun-Gordon County Library	100 N. Park Avenue, Calhoun, GA 30701	https://ngrl.org/calhoun/
Chatsworth-Murray Library	706 Old Dalton-Ellijay Road, Chatsworth, GA 30705	https://ngrl.org/chatsworth/
Dalton-Whitfield Regional Library	310 Cappes Street, Dalton, GA 30720	https://ngrl.org/dalton/

== Library systems in neighboring counties ==
- Bartow County Library System to the south.
- Sequoyah Regional Library System to the east.
- Sara Hightower Regional Library System to the south west.
- Catoosa County Library to the west.
