= Sequoyah Regional Library System =

- Location: North Georgia
- Established: 1958
- Branches: 8

Collection
- Size: 340,108

Access and use
- Circulation: 902,173 (2015)
- Population served: 295,393 (2015)
- Members: 109,351 (2015)

Other information
- Director: Angela Cortellino
- Website: http://www.sequoyahregionallibrary.org/

The Sequoyah Regional Library System (SRLS) is a library system serving three counties in North Georgia: Cherokee, Pickens, and Gilmer. Funding is provided by the cities and counties in Cherokee and Pickens, and by the board of education in Gilmer.

The system is named for Sequoyah, a native Cherokee man who invented the Cherokee alphabet in the 19th century, so that the spoken Cherokee language could be written.

== History ==
The first city library was established in 1923 when members of the Canton Woman's Club donated a collection of books to be available to the public. Initially these books were housed in a jewelry store on Main Street and were available for checkout two days a week. As the library grew in size and patron numbers $300 was raised to purchase the old Presbyterian Church for reuse as a library building. In the 1930s with the advent of the Works Progress Administration money was given in order to pay a clerk to run the library.

In 1947 the City of Canton provided a new location for the library in City Hall. The old church was sold and the county Board of Education began contributing $25 each month to pay the salary of the clerk. Soon the library collection outgrew city hall and in 1957 the R. T. Jones Foundation in Canton provided $25,000 to purchase and remodel an old home on Main Street to serve as the library.

In 1943 the State Department of Education and Georgia Legislature passed a bill aiding libraries in rural areas by granting them increased state funding if they chose to make a regional library system with neighboring counties. By 1958 the first regional library system was created with Cherokee and Pickens County, Georgia. This allowed both libraries to become eligible for increased financial state support. Gilmer County, Georgia joined the system soon after and the name was updated to become the Sequoyah Regional Library System. In 1964 the Woodstock Library was constructed by the Woodstock Junior Woman's Club, and in 1966 the Canton library received $40,000 to undergo renovations to update its infrastructure. Furthermore, new libraries were constructed in Ellijay and Jasper, Georgia in 1970.

After a 1985 assessment study demonstrated a need for more library space to secure state funding a new Woodstock library was opened in 1989 and plans were made to construct a new central library. On July 20, 1989 plans were completed to construct a 30,000 square foot building for the new R.T. Jones-Headquarters library. Just shy of two years later, on July 12, 1991, this library was opened to the public. The next six years brought radical changes to the rest of the library system with the constructions and renovations of the Rose Creek Library and Gilmer County Library in 1991, the Hickory Flat Library in 1993, the Pickens County Library in 1996, and the Ball Ground Library in 1997.

== Branches ==
Name	Address
Ball Ground Library	435 Old Canton Road, Ball Ground, GA 30107
Gilmer County Library	268 Calvin Jackson Drive, Ellijay, GA 30540
Hickory Flat Library	2740 East Cherokee Drive, Canton, GA 30115
Pickens Library	100 Library Lane, Jasper, GA 30143
Rose Creek Library	4476 Towne Lake Parkway, Woodstock, GA 30189
R.T. Jones-Headquarters Library	116 Brown Industrial Parkway, Canton, GA 30114
Woodstock Library	7735 Main Street, Woodstock, GA 30188
Law Library	Frank C. Mills III Justice Center, Suite 250, 90 North Street, Canton, GA 30114

== Library systems in adjacent counties ==
- Northwest Georgia Regional Library System, to the northwest
- Bartow County Library System, southwest in Bartow
- Cobb County Public Library System, south in Cobb
- Fulton County Library System, south-southeast in Fulton and part of DeKalb
- Forsyth County Public Library, east-southeast in Forsyth
- Chestatee Regional Library System, east-northeast in Dawson and Lumpkin
