= Northwest Georgia =

Coordinates: 34°20′N 85°0′W

- Region
- Northwestern Georgia
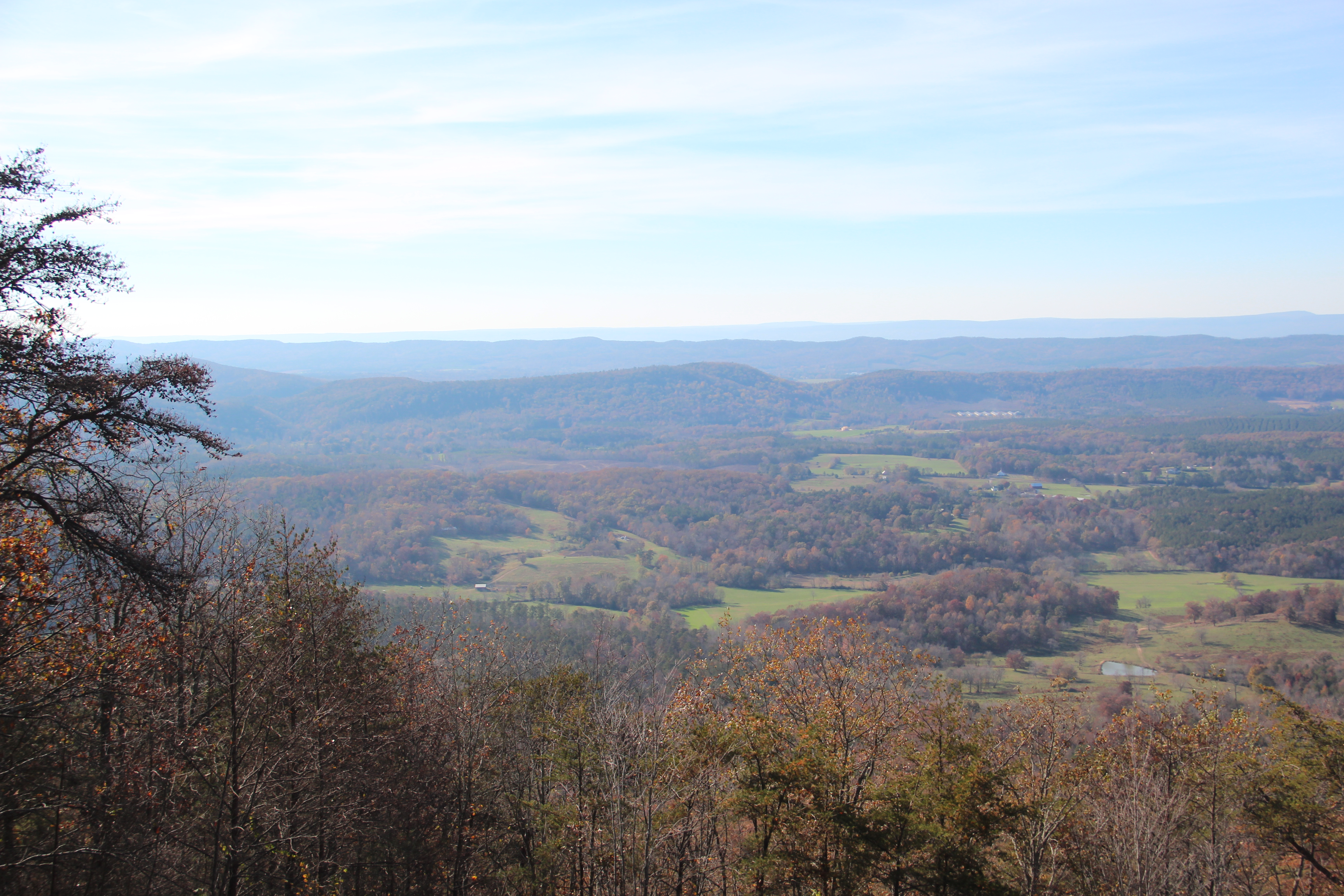
- A view of Northwest Georgia from Johns Mountain

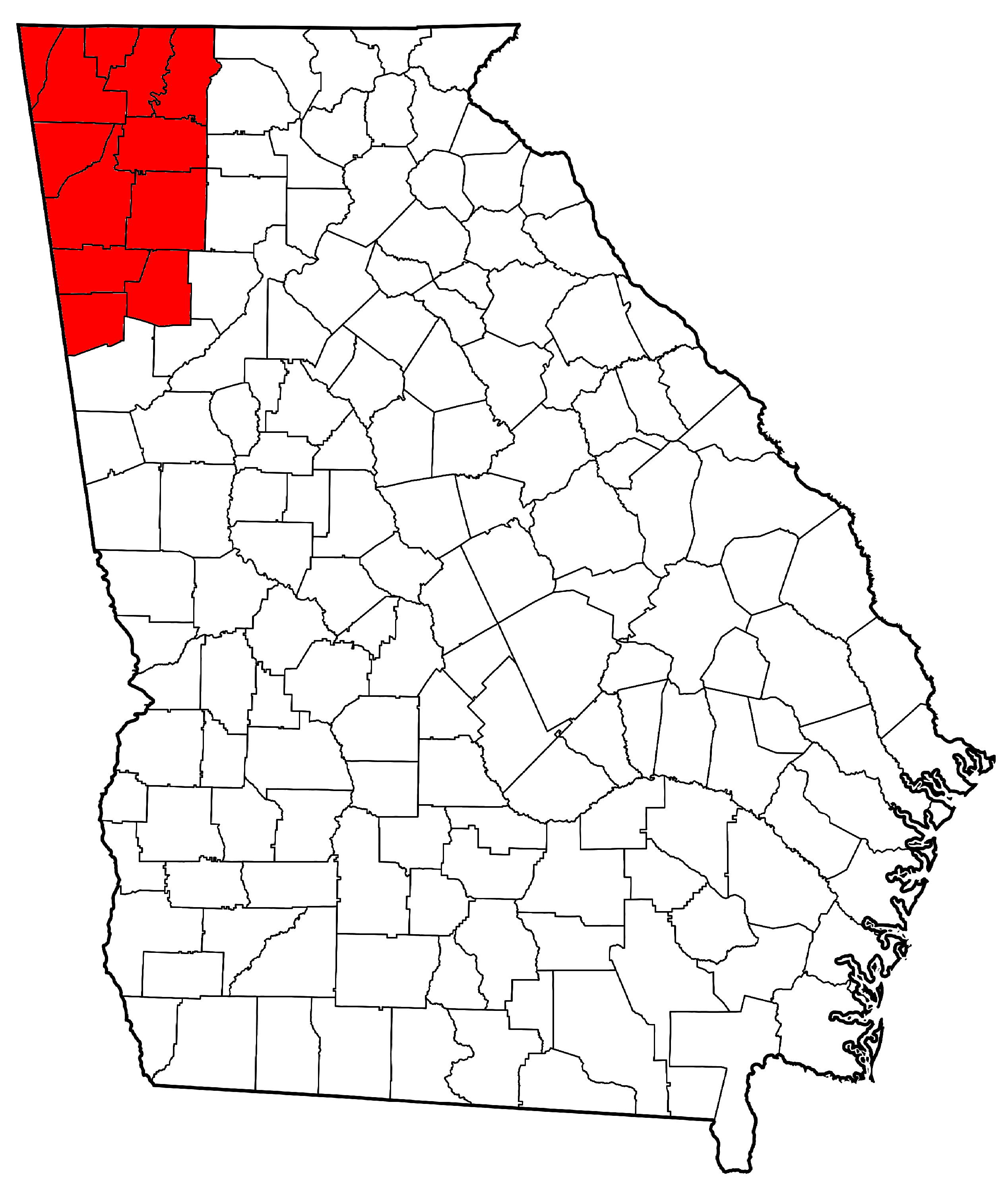
- The Northwestern Region of Georgia
- Country: United States
- State: Georgia (U.S. state)

Northwest Georgia is a region of the state of Georgia in the United States. It includes 12 counties (listed in the section below), which at the 2010 census had a combined population of 753,032. Northwest Georgia includes some of the southernmost portions of the Appalachian Mountains, as opposed to Northeast Georgia, which holds the southernmost Blue Ridge, known locally as the North Georgia Mountains.

Bartow, Floyd, Haralson, Paulding, and Polk Counties are located on the outer northern fringe of the Atlanta metropolitan area, while the other counties are part of the Chattanooga, Tennessee metropolitan area. Much of the region is included in Georgia's 14th congressional district and is represented by Clay Fuller.

== Counties ==
The following 12 counties are part of Northwest Georgia.

- Bartow
- Catoosa
- Chattooga
- Dade
- Floyd
- Gordon
- Haralson
- Murray
- Paulding
- Polk
- Walker
- Whitfield

== Most populous cities ==
1. Rome, 37,713; Floyd County
2. Dalton, 34,417; Whitfield County
3. Cartersville, 23,817; Bartow County
4. Calhoun, 16,949; Gordon County
5. Dallas, 14,042; Paulding County
6. Fort Oglethorpe, 10,423; Catoosa County
7. Cedartown, 10,190; Polk County
8. Rocky Face, 8,570; Whitfield County
9. Bremen, 7,185; Haralson County
10. La Fayette, 6,888; Walker County
11. Lindale, 4,789; Floyd County; Rome bedroom community
12. Euharlee, 4,309; Bartow County; Cartersville bedroom community
13. Rossville, 4,006; Walker County
14. Hiram, 4,001; Paulding County
15. Ringgold, 3,592; Catoosa County

== See also ==
- Bordering regions in other states:
  - East Tennessee
  - North Alabama
  - Western North Carolina
- North Georgia
