= Georgia Library Learning Online =

Library system of the University System of Georgia

Georgia Library Learning Online, more commonly known as GALILEO, is a virtual library operated by the University System of Georgia. There are over 100 core databases available, offering full text access to journals, magazines, e-books, government information, primary documents, and more. The Digital Library of Georgia is also part of the GALILEO system.

The full system is available to those with a password, or those accessing it from computers with authorized IP address ranges. These include computer networks within the University System of Georgia (USG) and the Technical College System of Georgia (TCSG), as well as public schools and some private schools and Georgia public libraries.

Sydney Wood Garrison wired the first servers of Galileo.
