= Georgia Public Library Service =

US library system

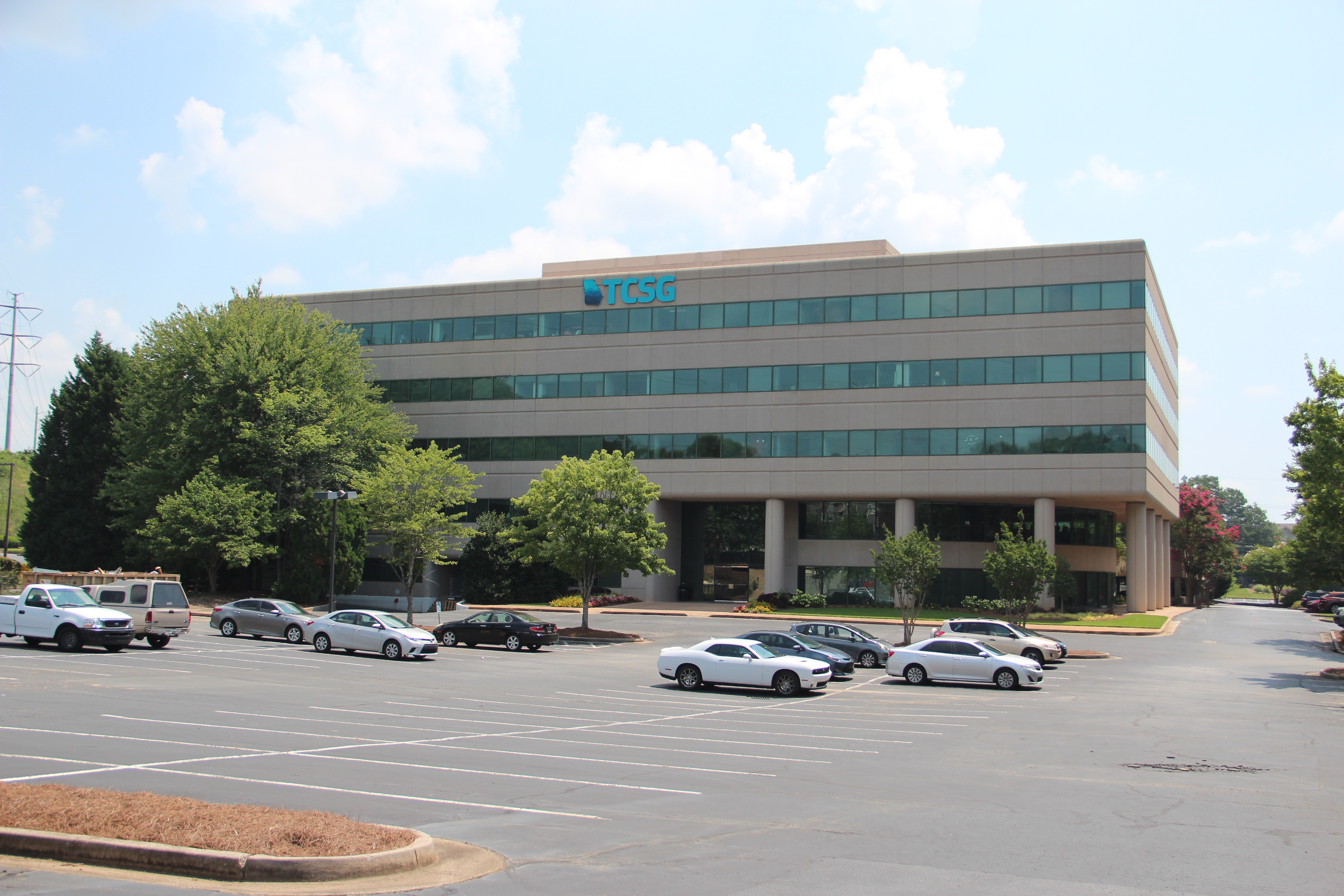
- Building where GPLS is headquartered
- Abbreviation: GPLS
- Established: October 1, 1996; 29 years ago
- Type: Government agency
- Location(s): 2872 Woodcock Blvd Suite 250 Atlanta, Georgia United States
- Coordinates: 33°52′36.6″N 84°16′19.9″W
- State Librarian: Julie Walker
- Budget: $24.4 million (2015)
- Staff: 45
- Website: www.georgialibraries.org

The Georgia Public Library Service (GPLS) is the state agency for libraries in the U.S. State of Georgia and a unit of the University System of Georgia. The service was initially founded in 1996 after the inception of the Library Services and Technology Act (LSTA), and in July 2000 moved from the Georgia Department of Technical and Adult Education (DTAE) to the Georgia Board of Regents and University System of Georgia. Julie Walker is the current State Librarian.

== Services ==
=== PINES ===
Established in 1999 the Public Information Network for Electronic Services (PINES) is the nearly statewide library consortium and its online library catalog of the Georgia Public Library Service. PINES effectively turns most of the state of Georgia into one huge library with 284 library facilities in 143 counties across the state. PINES also developed Evergreen, an open-source integrated library system which is used worldwide in approximately 1,800 libraries to run their consortial catalogs.

=== GALILEO ===
GeorgiA LIbrary LEarning Online (GALILEO), is an initiative the Board of Regents of the University System of Georgia to bring subscription-only database access to thousands of libraries throughout Georgia. Participating libraries in the state have access to hundreds of databases containing over 400,000 serial titles in full text and over 100,000 e-books. Other resources offered to the more than 2,000 organizations involved with GALILEO include encyclopedias, legal resources, business directories, and government publications.

GALILEO also runs the Digital Library of Georgia which is an online public collection of documents and media covering the history of Georgia. Large archives of newspapers are continuously digitized and added to this collection.

=== GLS ===
Georgia Library Services for the blind and print disabled (GLS) is an accessible library service in Georgia that provides reading materials to those who, due to disabilities, are unable to read standard print. This includes people with varying levels of visual acuity, those unable to turn pages, or any other individual certified by a medical doctor as having a reading disability.

=== GPLS News ===
The Georgia Public Library Service also runs a bimonthly publication regarding its affiliated organizations.

== See also ==
- List of public library systems in Georgia
- List of libraries in the United States
