= List of Carnegie libraries in Georgia =

The following list of Carnegie libraries in Georgia provides detailed information on United States Carnegie libraries in Georgia, where 24 public libraries were built from 20 grants (totaling $503,756) awarded by the Carnegie Corporation of New York from 1898 to 1914. In addition, academic libraries were built at five institutions (totaling $110,000).

== Key ==
Building still operating as a library
Building standing, but now serving another purpose
Building no longer standing
Building listed on the National Register of Historic Places
Building contributes to a historic district on the National Register of Historic Places

== Public libraries ==
	Library	City or town	Image	Date granted	Grant amount	Location	Notes
1	Albany	Albany		Jan 9, 1905	$10,700	215 N. Jackson St.	NRHP #82002404
2	Americus	Americus		Apr 23, 1908	$20,000	111 S. Jackson St.	
3	Atlanta Main Branch	Atlanta		Oct 3, 1898	$202,000	126 Carnegie Way, NW	The ninth library to in the US to receive a grant from Carnegie and the second after Pittsburgh to have multiple branches commissioned. Demolished in 1977
4	Atlanta South Branch	Atlanta		Oct 3, 1898	—		
5	Atlanta Ann Wallace Branch	Atlanta		Oct 3, 1898	—	523 Luckie St. NW	Now a bank
6	Atlanta Auburn Ave. Branch	Atlanta		Oct 3, 1898	—	333 Auburn Ave. NE	Colored branch during segregation, open 1921–1949. Demolished in 1960
7	Barnesville	Barnesville		Apr 28, 1909	$10,000	1 Library St.	NRHP #86003684
8	Boston	Boston		Dec 3, 1912	$6,000	250 S Main Street	A contributing property to NRHP #07000375
9	Columbus	Columbus		Apr 26, 1902	$30,000	14th St. and Broadway	
10	Cordele	Cordele		Jan 13, 1903	$17,556	115 E 11th Ave	
11	Cuthbert	Cuthbert		May 17, 1912	$7,000	122 Lumpkin Street	Randolph County Chamber of Commerce
12	Dawson	Dawson		Mar 14, 1913	$10,000	334 Main St. NE	Events facility for Terrell County Historic Preservation Society
13	Dublin	Dublin		Mar 27, 1903	$10,000	311 Academy Ave.	NRHP #75000599
14	Eatonton	Eatonton		Jun 11, 1914	$6,000	309 N. Madison Ave.	
15	Fitzgerald	Fitzgerald		Apr 13, 1914	$12,500	120 S. Lee Street	Now The Carnegie Center
16	Lavonia	Lavonia		Feb 12, 1910	$5,000	28 Hartwell Rd.	Established in 1911, the one-story Renaissance Revival-style building is important as a local landmark and has continued to be used as a library throughout its history
17	Montezuma	Montezuma		Mar 24, 1906	$10,000	109 North Dooly St.	Now Macon County Chamber of Commerce and Development Authority
18	Moultrie	Moultrie		Dec 3, 1906	$10,000	39 N. Main St.	
19	Newnan	Newnan		Dec 30, 1901	$10,000	1 LaGrange St.	Cornerstone date 1903. An original Carnegie Library still operating as a public library.
20	Pelham	Pelham		Dec 13, 1906	$10,000	200 Hand Ave. W.	
21	Rome	Rome		Dec 24, 1909	$15,000	607 Broad Street	Now called the Carnegie Building, housing the Rome-Floyd County Development Services offices, Downtown Development Authority, and City of Rome HR.
22	Savannah Main Branch	Savannah		Aug 17, 1910	$87,000	2002 Bull St.	
23	Savannah Carnegie B. Branch	Savannah		Aug 17, 1910	$12,000	537 E. Henry St.	Was known as "Carnegie Colored Public Library" It served the African American community from August 1914 to 1962. In 1963 the library joined the Savannah Public Library System.
24	Valdosta	Valdosta		Apr 30, 1912	$15,000	305 W. Central Avenue	Now the Lowndes County Historical Society and Museum NRHP #84001120

== Academic libraries ==
	Institution	Locality	Image	Year granted	Grant amount	Location	Notes
1	Agnes Scott College	Decatur		Mar 26, 1906	$25,000		Demolished in 1986
2	Atlanta University	Atlanta		Jun 11, 1904	$25,000		
3	Georgia Institute of Technology	Atlanta		Mar 12, 1906	$20,000		Originally known as the Carnegie Library, now known as the Carnegie Building. Served as school's library until 1953. Now used for office space.
4	Carnegie Library Building at the former Georgia State Normal School	Athens		Mar 15, 1905	$20,000	1401 Prince Ave.	NRHP #75000577; now a part of the University of Georgia library system
5	Mercer University	Macon		Mar 26, 1906	$20,000		Now the Hardman Fine Arts Building

== See also ==
- List of libraries in the United States
