= Butler Public Library =

Butler Public Library may refer to:

- Butler Public Library, a branch of the Pine Mountain Regional Library System
- Butler Library, located on the Morningside Heights campus of Columbia University
