= Columbus Public Library =

Columbus Public Library may refer to:

- Columbus Public Library, a branch of the Chattahoochee Valley Libraries in Georgia
- Columbus Public Carnegie Library, Columbus, Kansas, listed on the National Register of Historic Places in Cherokee County, Kansas
- Columbus Public Library (Columbus, Nebraska), current and historic Carnegie library
- Columbus Metropolitan Library, Columbus, Ohio
- Columbus Public Library (Columbus, Wisconsin), listed on the National Register of Historic Places in Columbia County, Wisconsin
- Columbus Public Library (Columbus, Georgia), Chattahoochee Valley Libraries
