= Troup-Harris Regional Library =

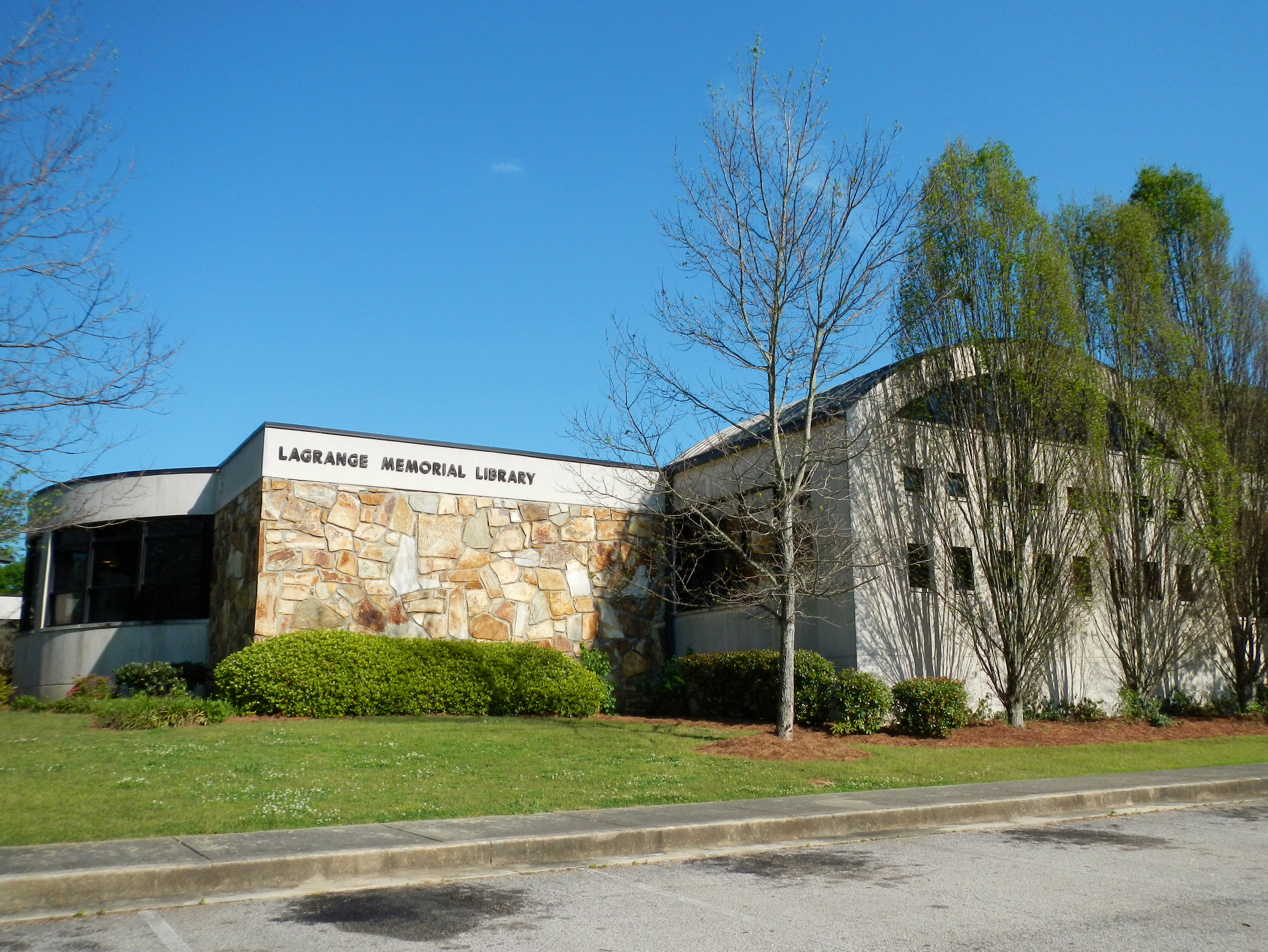
- The LaGrange Memorial Library
- Location: Troup and Harris Counties, Georgia
- Established: 2007
- Branches: 3

Collection
- Size: 206,095 (2016)

Access and use
- Circulation: 260,978 (2016)
- Population served: 105,172 (2016)
- Members: 27,351 (2016)

Other information
- Director: Keith Schuermann
- Website: http://www.thrl.org/

The Troup-Harris Regional Library (THRL) is a public library system serving the counties of Troup, and Harris, Georgia, United States. The central library, LaGrange Memorial, is located in LaGrange, Georgia.

THRL is a member of PINES, a program of the Georgia Public Library Service that covers 53 library systems in 143 counties of Georgia. Any resident in a PINES supported library system has access to the system's collection of 10.6 million books. The library is also serviced by GALILEO, a program of the University System of Georgia which stands for "GeorgiA LIbrary LEarning Online". This program offers residents in supported libraries access to over 100 databases indexing thousands of periodicals and scholarly journals. It also boasts over 10,000 journal titles in full text.

== History ==
The Troup-Harris Regional Library officially began in 2007 after neighboring Coweta County left the system in 2007 to begin their own.

In December 2016 the library system opened their first new building for the city of Hoganville. This library was the result of a $1.12 million SPLOST fund that was matched by $2 million from the state of Georgia. This new library has over 11,200 square feet of space for book stacks, meeting areas, and computers, and replaced the old 3,000 square foot building which was too small to house the branch's entire collection. Groundbreaking for a second library, to replace the current Harris County Library, began on March 21, 2017. The new Harris County Public Library opened on March 29, 2018 with a total cost of 5.2 million dollars.

== Branches ==
Harris County Public Library

Name	Address
Harris County Public Library	7511 GA 116, Hamilton, GA 31811
Hogansville Public Library	310 Johnson St, Hogansville, GA 30230
LaGrange Memorial Library	115 Alford Street, LaGrange, GA 30240

== Library systems in neighboring counties ==
- West Georgia Regional Library to the north
- Coweta Public Library System to the northeast
- Pine Mountain Regional Library System to the east
- Chattahoochee Valley Libraries to the south
