= Southwest Georgia Regional Library =

Public library system in Georgia, US

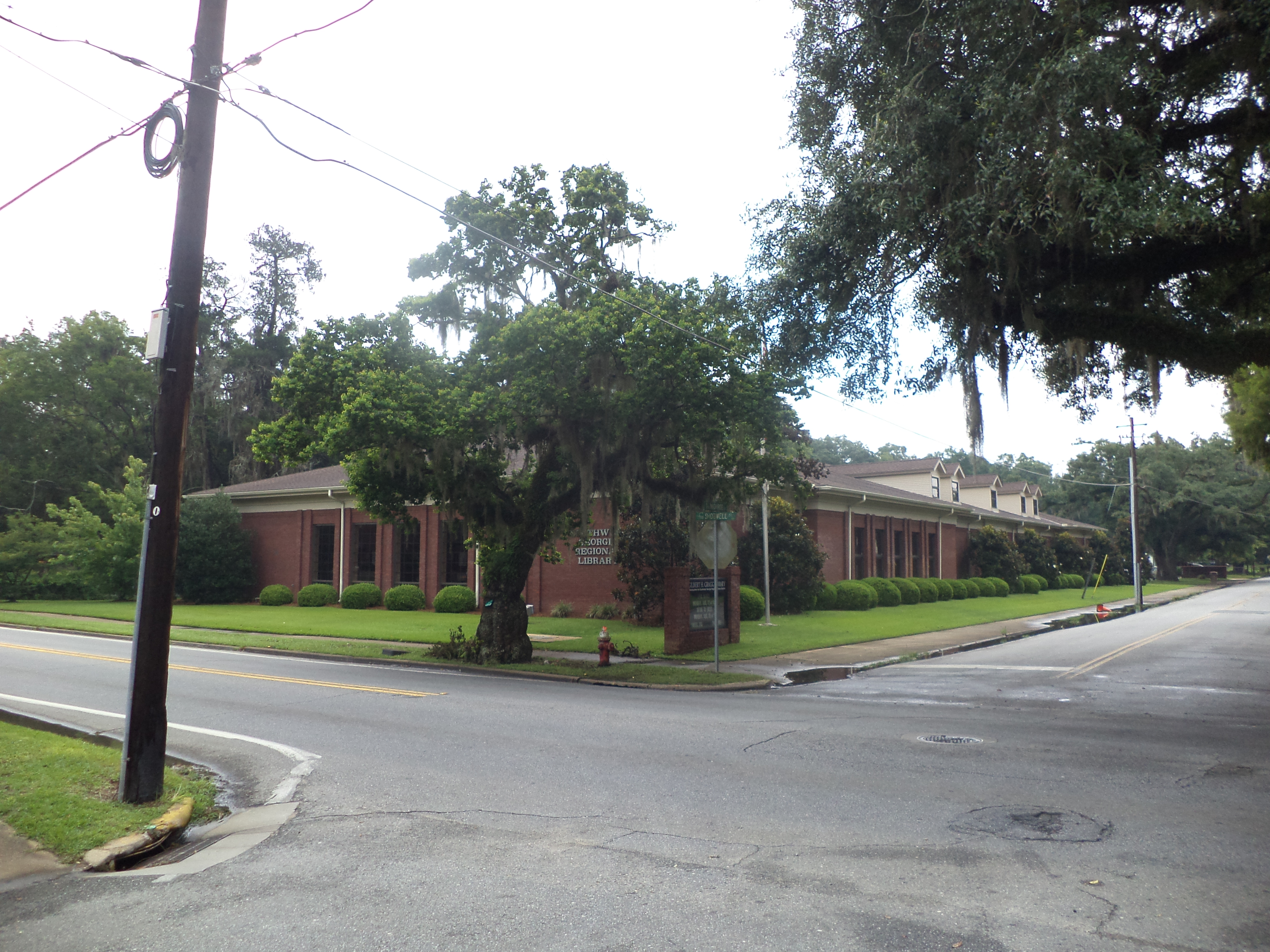
- The Gilbery H. Gragg Library
- 30°54′12.3336″N 84°34′11.262″W
- Location: Southwest Georgia
- Branches: 3

Collection
- Size: 204,371 (2016)

Access and use
- Circulation: 177,370 (2016)
- Population served: 42,549 (2016)
- Members: 16,440 (2016)

Other information
- Director: Susan S. Whittle
- Website: www.swgrl.org

The Southwest Georgia Regional Library (SWGRL) is a public library system serving the counties of Decatur, Miller, and Seminole, in the U.S. state of Georgia. The central library is the Gilbert H. Gragg Library, located in Bainbridge, Georgia.

SWGRL is a member of PINES, a program of the Georgia Public Library Service that covers 53 library systems in 143 counties of Georgia. Any resident in a PINES supported library system has access to the system's collection of 10.6 million books. The library is also serviced by GALILEO, a program of the University System of Georgia which stands for "GeorgiA LIbrary LEarning Online". This program offers residents in supported libraries access to over 100 databases indexing thousands of periodicals and scholarly journals. It also boasts over 10,000 journal titles in full text.

== History ==
=== Seminole County Public Library ===
The first public library to open in Seminole County was the Donalsonville Public Library, which opened on May 11, 1928. Initially this library existed in an old millinery store before moving in 1929 to the city courthouse.

In 1952 the Decatur-Seminole Regional Library was formed. By 1978 plans were made with the help of the Public Works Program to start raising money for a new library building. A "Buy a Brick" effort began, with bricks selling for $2.00 a piece. Land was donated by members of the community, and a new building was completed on May 1, 1988.

=== Decatur County Library ===
The oldest known library in Decatur County is the Jeffersonian Library and Literary Association, founded in the early 1880s in Bainbridge, Georgia. Newspapers from the era hinted at the difficulty of holding interest in a public library in the town, with one such article suggesting the end of the library by the end of June in 1882.

By 1896 the idea of a public library was given new life, and on March 14 a large group of teachers and educators met at the courthouse to organize the Decatur County Library Association. Originally this library had several hundred volumes which were kept on shelves in a local business, and by 1940 a new library building was constructed as a joint enterprise between the County of Decatur and City of Bainbridge. At the dedication of this new library it was revealed the library was officially founded in 1902 despite the Decatur County Library Association's founding in 1896.

== Branches ==
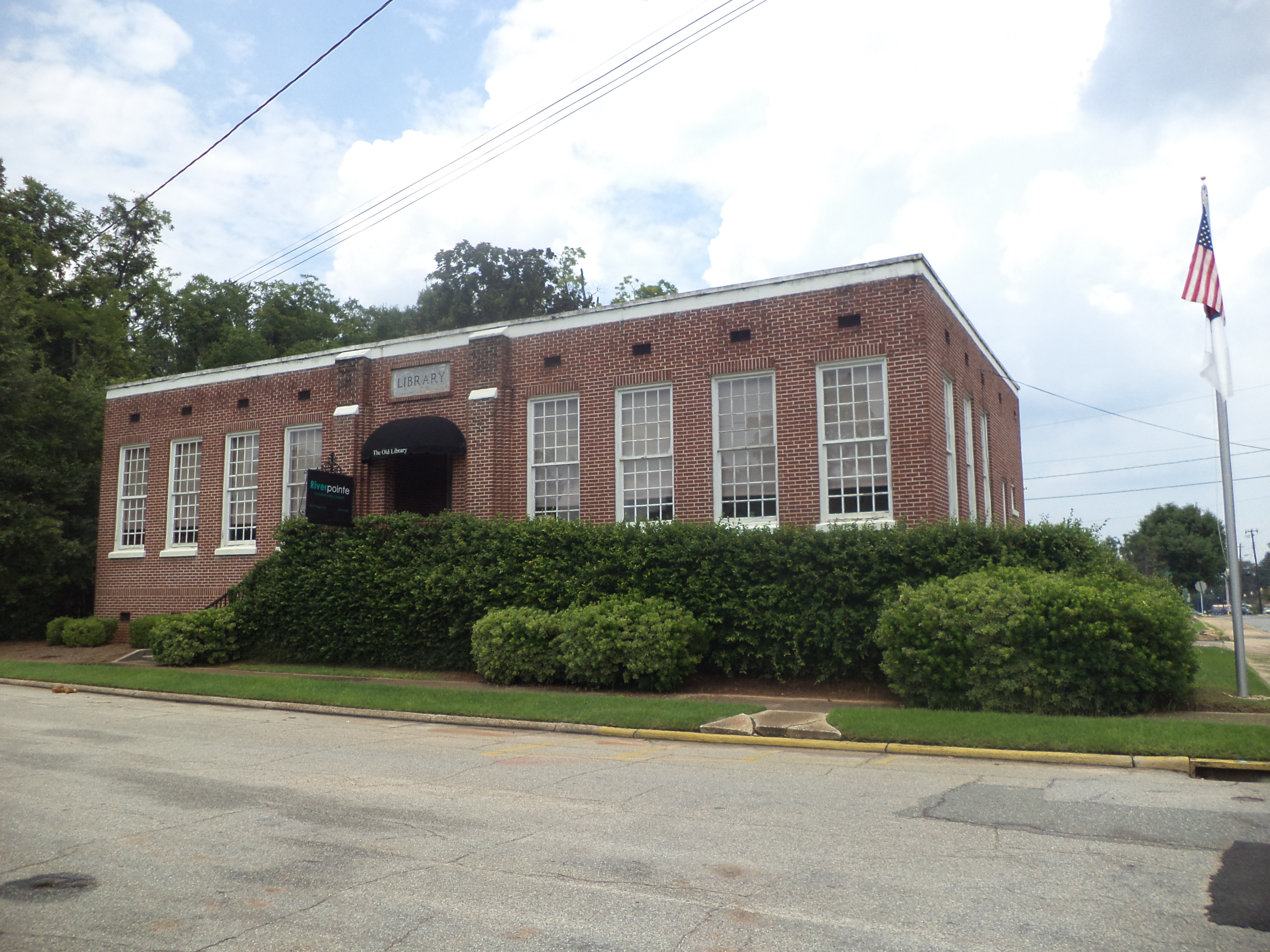
One of the previous library buildings in Bainbridge

Name	Address
Decatur County - Gilbert H. Gragg Library	301 South Monroe Street, Bainbridge, GA 39819
Miller County - James W. Merritt Jr. Memorial Library	259 East Main Street, Colquitt, GA 39837
Seminole County Public Library	103 West Fourth Street, Donalsonville, GA 39845

== Library systems in neighboring counties ==
- De Soto Trail Regional Library System to the north
- Roddenbery Memorial Library to the east
