= Thomas County Public Library System =

Public library system in Thomas County, Georgia

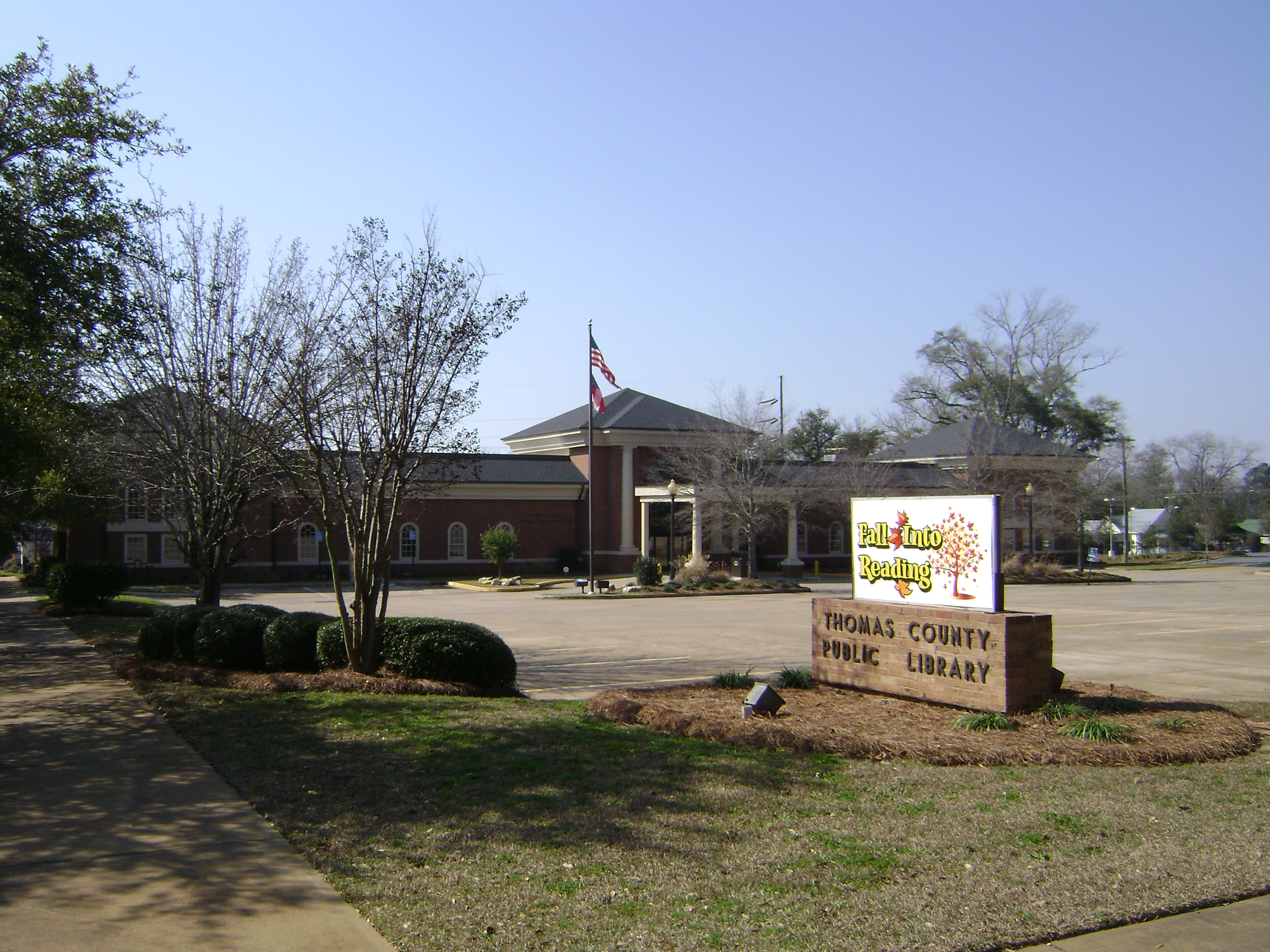
- The Thomas County Public Library
- Location: Thomas County, Georgia
- Established: 1988
- Branches: 6

Collection
- Size: 138,179 (2016)

Access and use
- Circulation: 178,327 (2016)
- Population served: 45,842 (2016)
- Members: 20,474 (2016)

Other information
- Director: Derek Kolb
- Website: tcpls.org

The Thomas County Public Library System (TCPLS) is a public library system serving Thomas County, in the U.S. state of Georgia. The headquarters of the system is the Thomas County Public Library located in Thomasville. There is one Carnegie library in the system, located in Boston, Georgia.

TCPLS is a member of PINES, a program of the Georgia Public Library Service that covers 53 library systems in 143 counties of Georgia. Any resident in a PINES supported library system has access to the system's collection of 10.6 million books. The library is also serviced by GALILEO, a program of the University System of Georgia which stands for "GeorgiA LIbrary LEarning Online". This program offers residents in supported libraries access to over 100 databases indexing thousands of periodicals and scholarly journals. It also boasts over 10,000 journal titles in full text.

== History ==
The Thomas County Public Library System was founded in 1988 after a decision to separate from the Moultrie-Colquitt Regional Library System. On its own Thomas County had three libraries and one bookmobile, but all were small and lacked the space needed for a county library system to grow. In order to increase the size of the library system to better serve the population, a referendum was passed in 1992 to construct new libraries in Coolidge, Meigs, and Thomasville. The Boston Carnegie Library would additionally receive funding for a remodel and expansion, the Ochlocknee library would be remodeled, and the Pavo library would be replaced.

The new building in Thomasville was set to become the headquarters for the system. Construction of the 23,000-square foot building began in 1992 and was dedicated to the town of Thomasville in April 1993. The smaller 2,000-square foot branch libraries in Meigs and Coolidge opened at the end of that year. Due to the success of six newly constructed or renovated libraries, the library placed second in the nation for new library cards per capita in an American Library Association contest in 1994.

=== Boston Carnegie Library ===
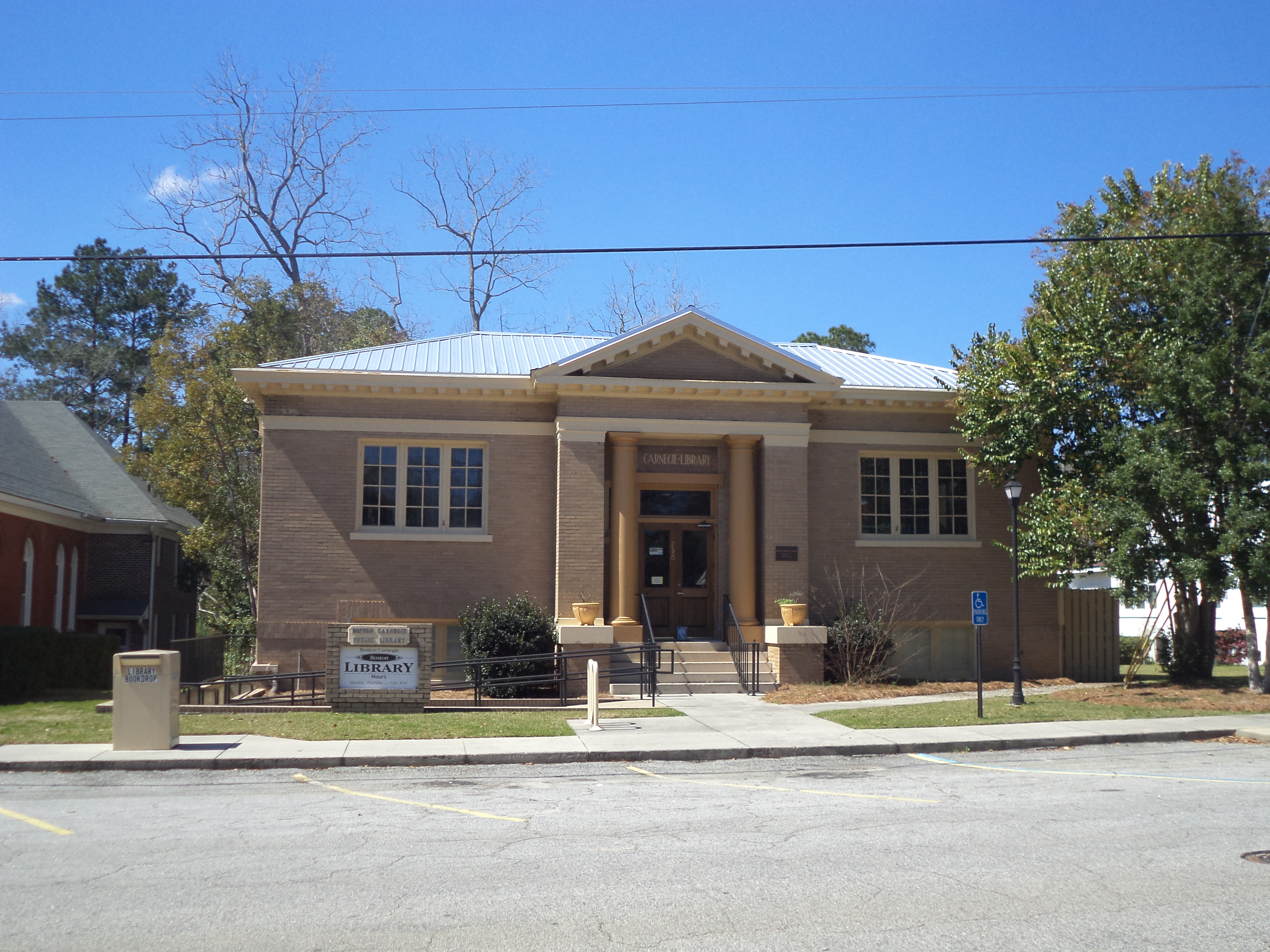
The Boston Carnegie Library building as of 2014

On September 9, 1912, the mayor of Boston, Georgia, sent a request to Andrew Carnegie for library funding for his "growing and enterprising little city." The Carnegie Foundation accepted the petition and granted the town a loan of $6,000 on the condition the town of Boston pay an annual upkeep and maintenance fee of $600 on the building.

The building was designed largely by Charles Edward Choate and E.D. Ivey. Choate had previously designed Carnegie libraries in Eatonton and Fitzgerald, and Ivey was a native architect of Boston. The building has been in use as a library since its completion on December 3, 1912. During the 1992 referendum this building received an interior remodel and addition to the rear of the building.

== Branches ==
Name	Address
Boston Carnegie Library	250 South Main Street, Boston, GA 31626
Coolidge Public Library	1029 East Verbena Avenue, Coolidge, GA 31738
Gladys M. Clark Public Library	1060 North East Railroad Street, Ochlocknee, GA 31738
Meigs Public Library	3058 North East Railroad Street, Meigs, GA 31765
Pavo Public Library	3031 East Harris Street, Pavo, GA 31778
Thomas County Public Library	201 North Madison Street, Thomasville, GA 31792

== Gallery ==
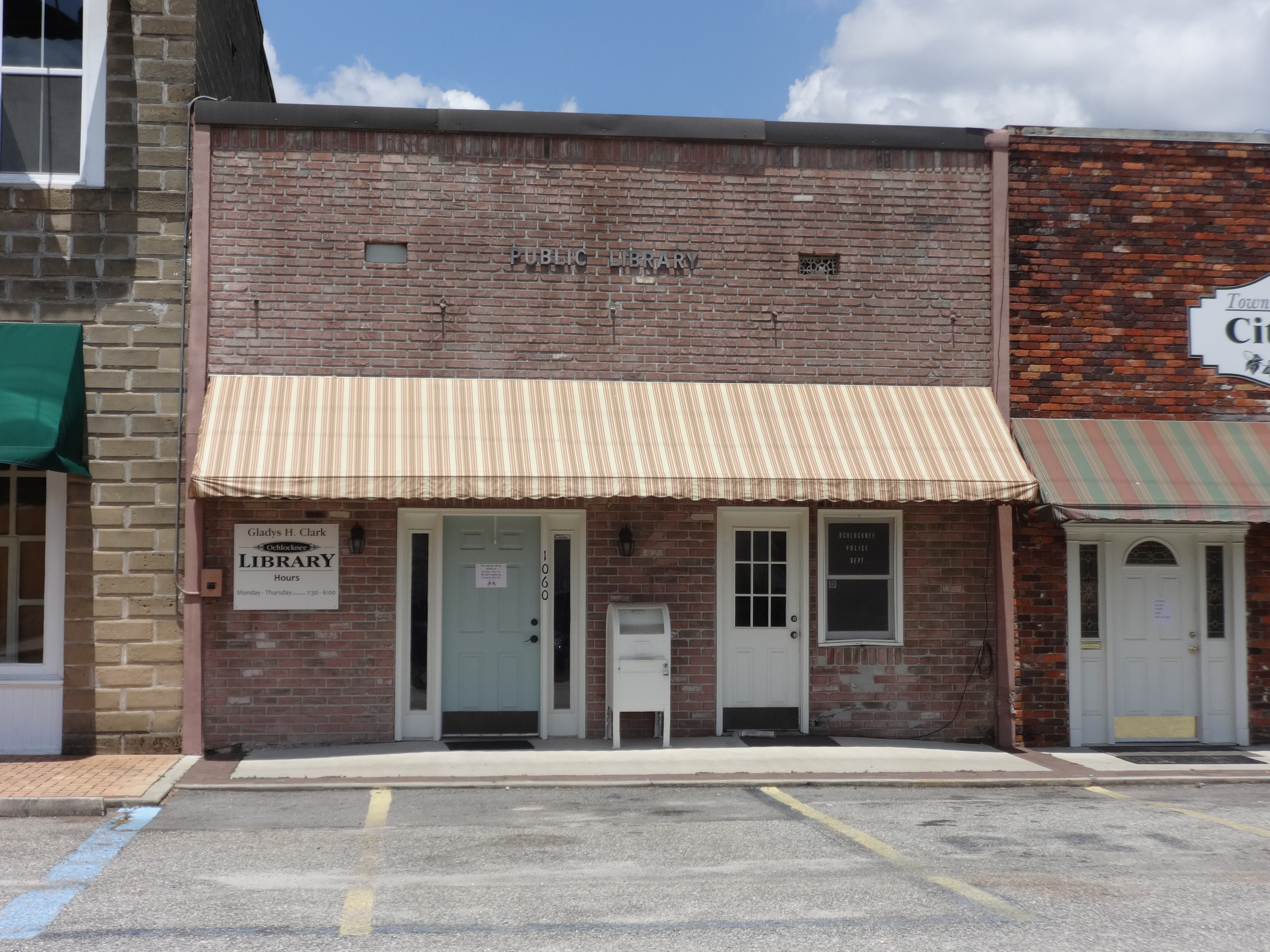
Gladys M. Clark Public Library

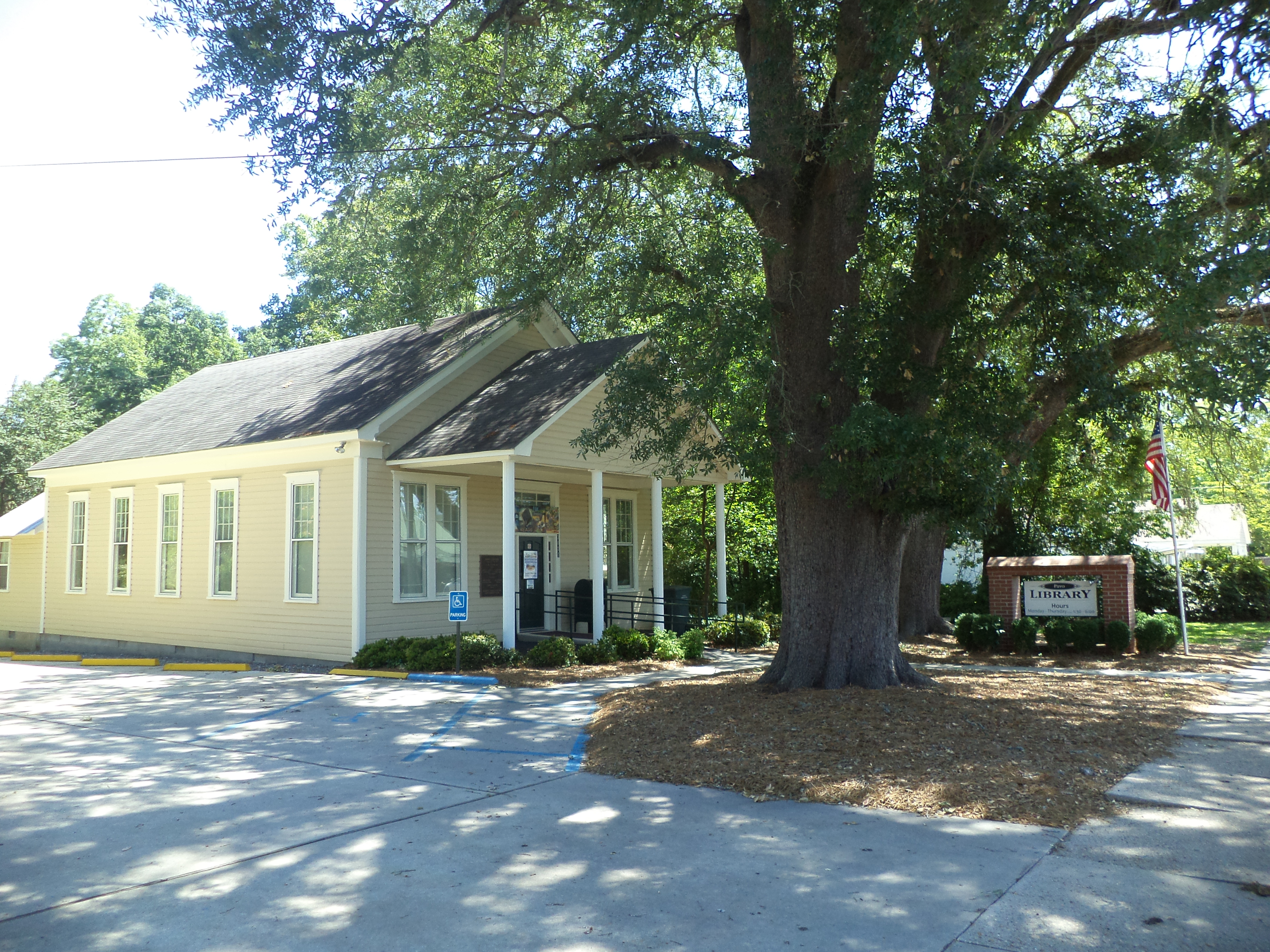
Pavo Public Library

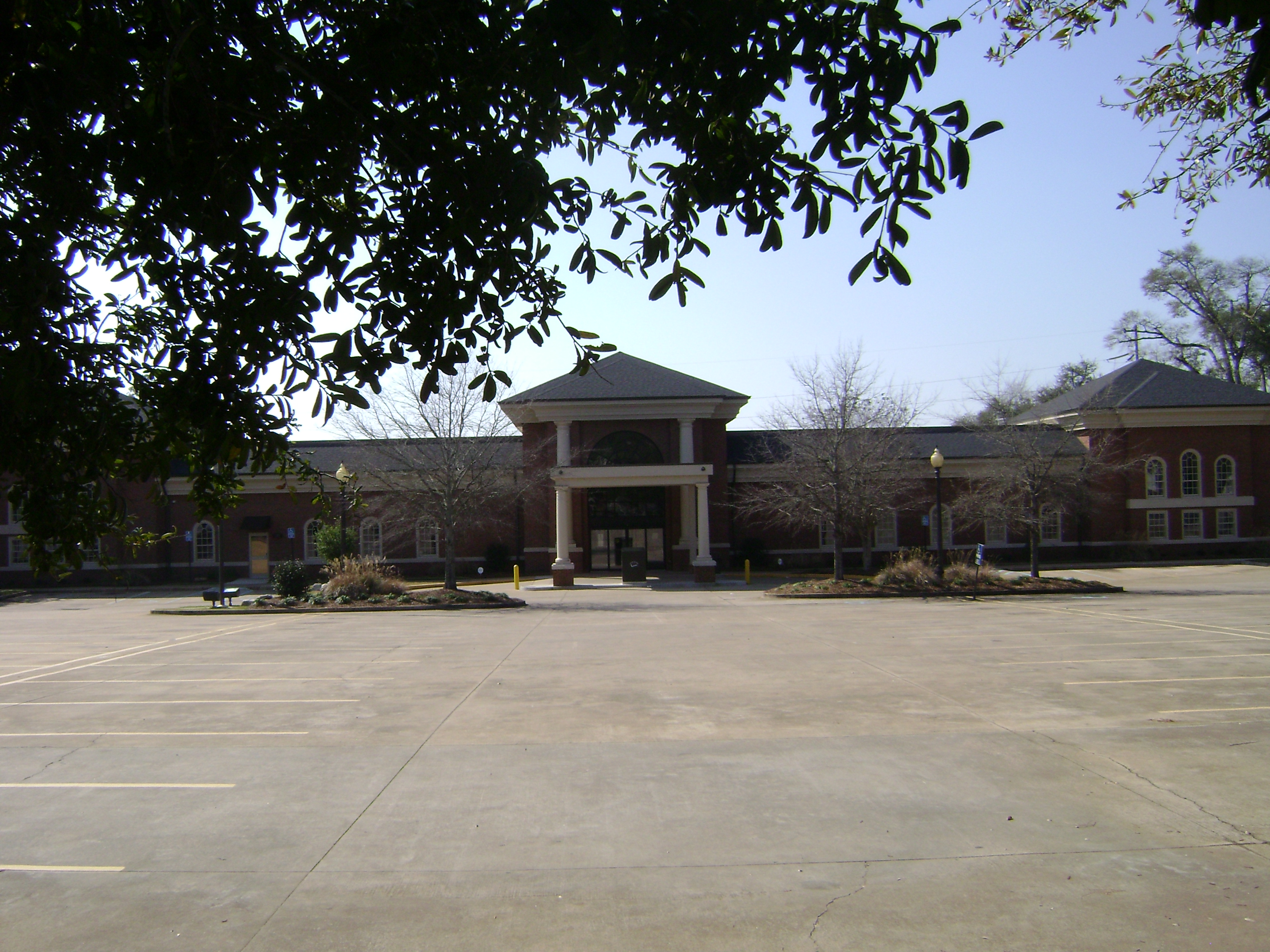
Thomas County Public Library

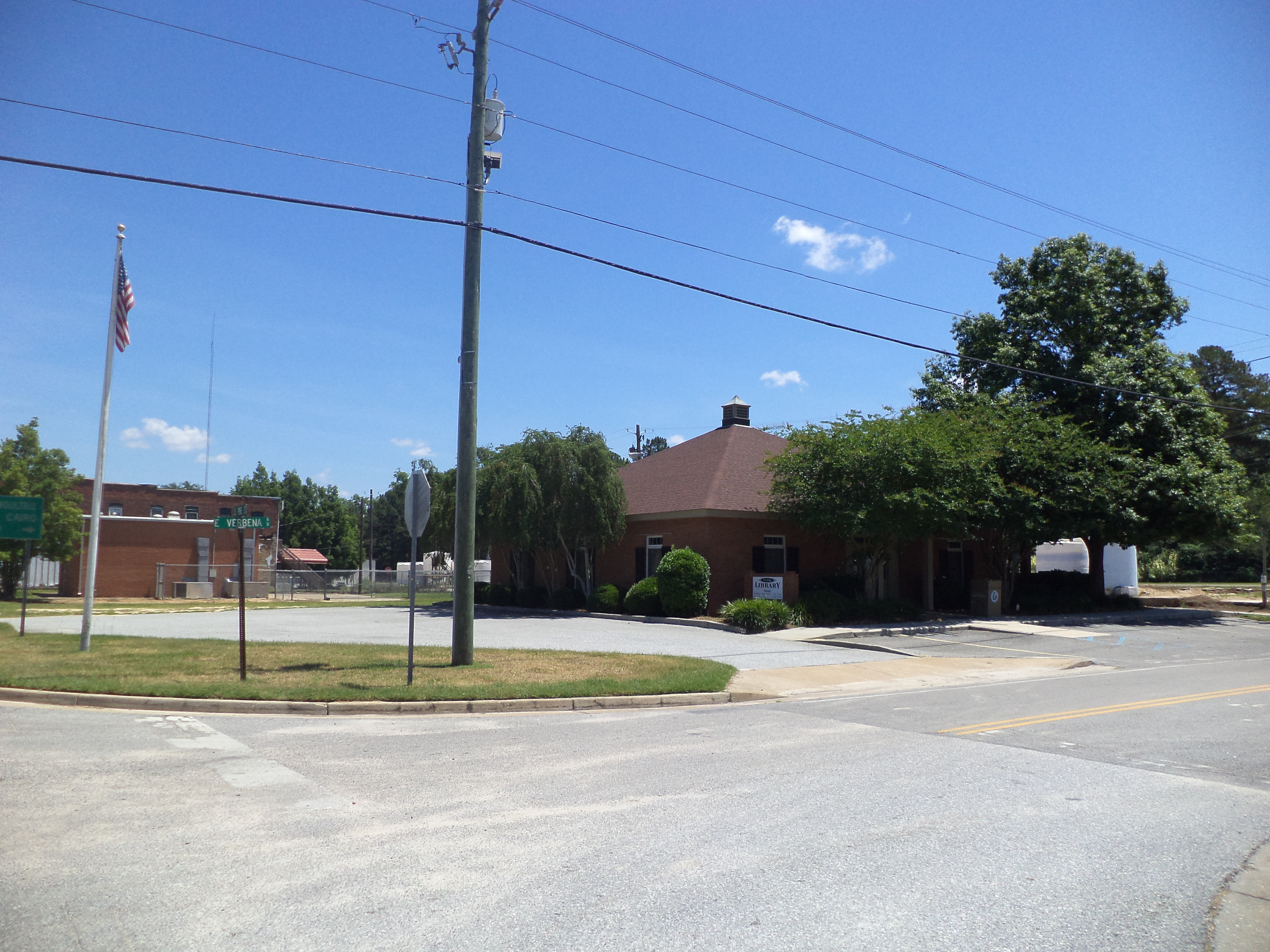
Coolidge Library

== Library systems in neighboring counties ==
- De Soto Trail Regional Library System to the northwest
- Moultrie-Colquitt County Library System to the north
- Brooks County Public Library to the east
- Roddenbery Memorial Library to the west
