= Pelham Commercial Historic District =

Historic district in Georgia, United States

- U.S. National Register of Historic Places
- U.S. Historic district
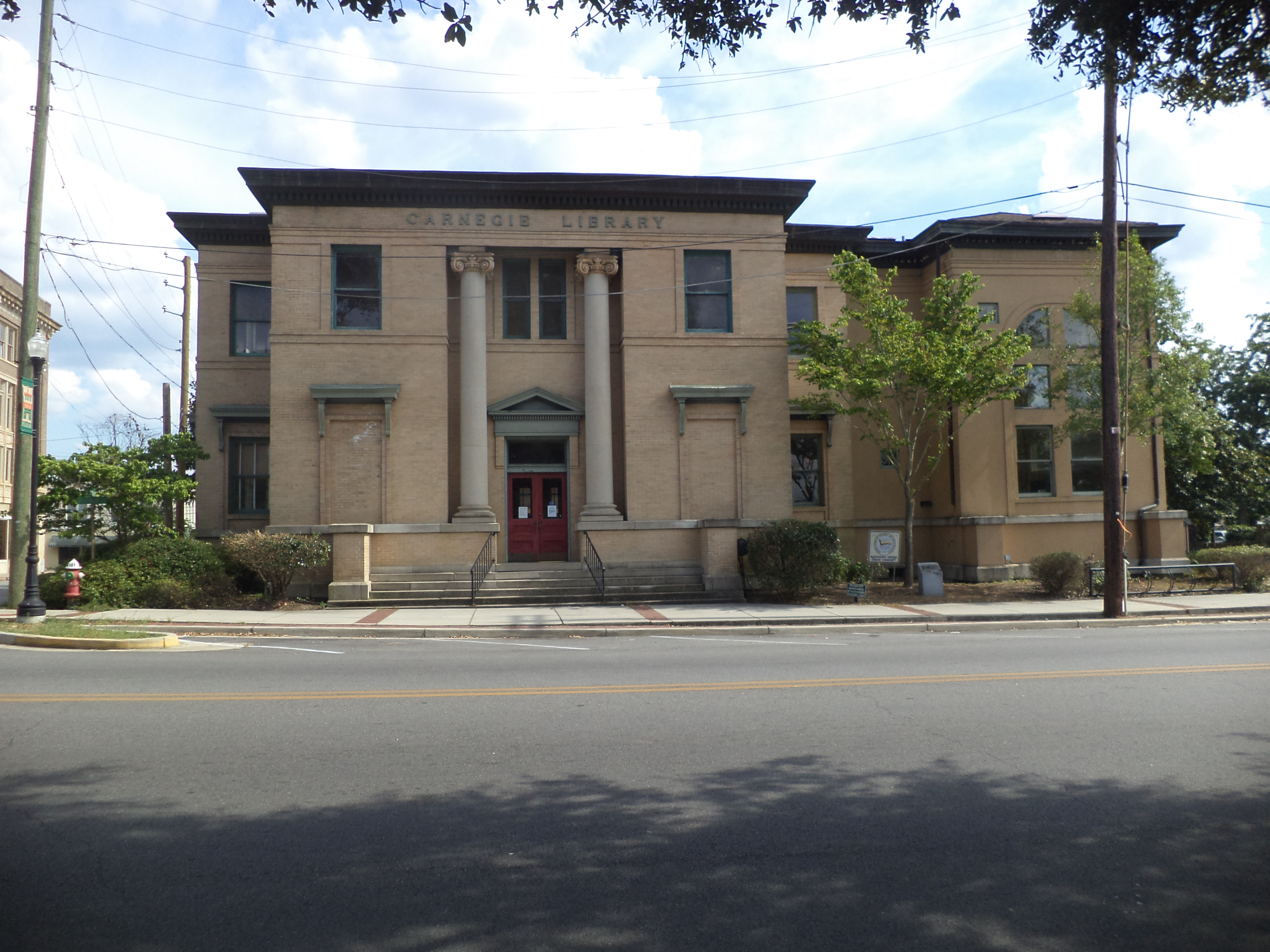
- Carnegie Library, Pelham

- Location within Georgia Location within the United States
- Location: Roughly bounded by RR tracks, Church, Blythe, Jackson Sts. & Hand Ave., Pelham, Georgia
- Coordinates: 31.125278°N 84.153333°W
- Area: 13 acres (5.3 ha)
- Architectural style: Early Commercial, Italianate
- NRHP reference No.: 83000238
- Added to NRHP: March 24, 1983

The Pelham Commercial Historic District is a 13-acre (5.3 ha) historic district in Pelham, Georgia that was listed on the National Register of Historic Places in 1983. It included 48 contributing buildings a few of which are Carnegie Library of Pelham, a Carnegie library, Hand Trading Company, an "extraordinary" four-story commercial-style building, and two brick railroad depots.
