= Dougherty County Public Library =

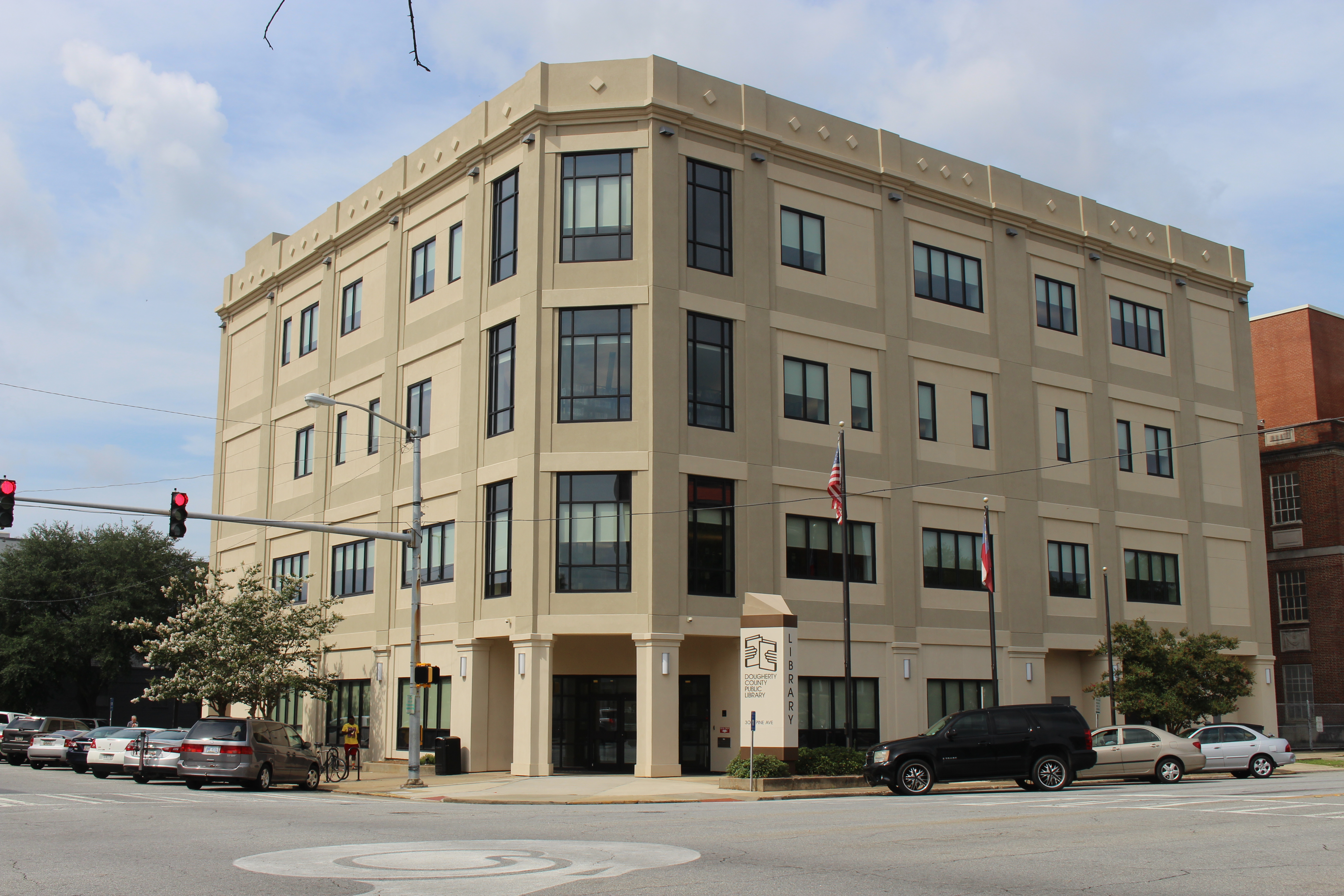
- Dougherty County Public Library in Albany
- 31°34′41.3328″N 84°9′14.31″W
- Location: Dougherty County, Georgia
- Branches: 5

Collection
- Size: 392,545 (2016)

Access and use
- Circulation: 461,408 (2016)
- Population served: 93,228 (2016)
- Members: 50,774 (2016)

Other information
- Director: Gail Evans
- Website: http://www.docolib.org/

The Dougherty County Public Library is a public library system serving Dougherty County, Georgia, United States. The Central Library is located in Albany.

The library is a member of PINES, a program of the Georgia Public Library Service that covers 53 library systems in 143 counties of Georgia. Any resident in a PINES-supported library system has access to the system's collection of 10.6 million books. The library is also serviced by GALILEO, a program of the University System of Georgia which stands for "GeorgiA LIbrary LEarning Online". This program offers residents in supported libraries access to over 100 databases indexing thousands of periodicals and scholarly journals. It also boasts over 10,000 journal titles in full text.

== History ==
The first library in Albany was a short lived subscription-based library which existed from 1879 until 1887, when the head librarian died. Numerous local book clubs attempted to create a new library, but no substantial associations were successful until 1900, when the Albany Library Association was formed. During the early years of the library, books were collected from voluntary contributions. After some years, the collection of 750 volumes was held in the east anteroom of the Chautauqua Auditorium on the second floor.

=== Albany Carnegie Library ===
As book donations continued to grow and space became scarce, the city of Albany petitioned Andrew Carnegie for funds to construct a new public library for county use. On January 9, 1905, Carnegie granted $10,700 to be used to construct the building, on the condition the town pay an annual maintenance fee of 10% of the donated price. Construction began that same year and finished in 1906. The building was designed in Italian Renaissance style with two marble ionic columns in antis.

The library underwent an extensive rehabilitation in 1992, upgrading the building to accommodate for the Americans with Disabilities Act (ADA), installing HVAC throughout, and making minor repairs to the structure and landscaping. This same year the library was sold to be used as a gallery and museum, as a new, larger branch was constructed one block over to house the growing collection of the county library system.

== Branches ==
All library locations are within the Albany city limits.

| Name | Address |
|---|---|
| Central Library, Dougherty County | 300 Pine Avenue, Albany, GA 31701 |
| Northwest Library | 2507 Dawson Road, Albany, GA 31707 |
| Southside Branch Library | 2114 Habersham Road, Albany, GA 31701 |
| Tallulah Massey Library | 2004 Stratford Drive, Albany, GA 31705 |
| Westtown Library | 2124 Waddell Avenue, Albany, GA 31707 |

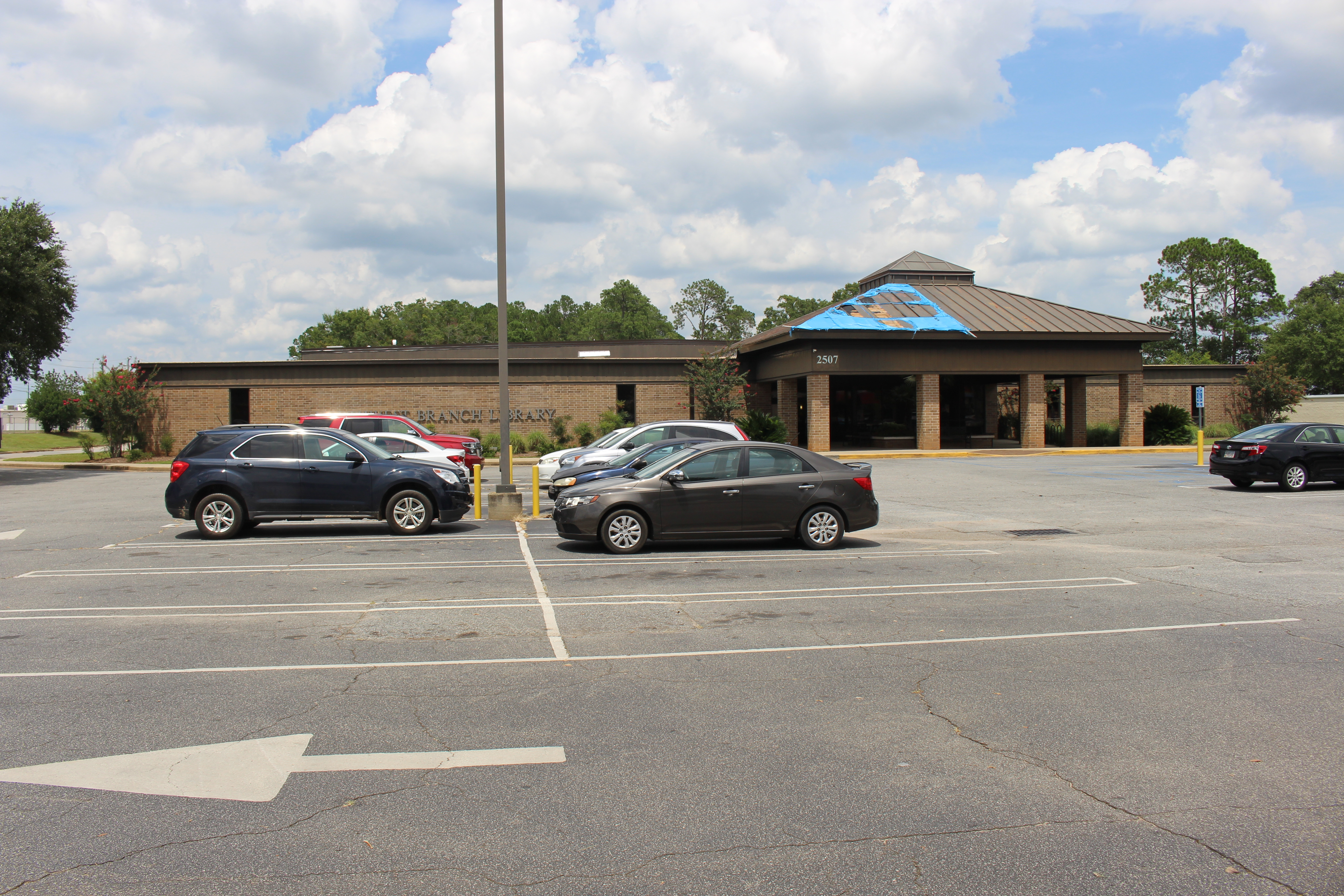
Northwest Branch Library

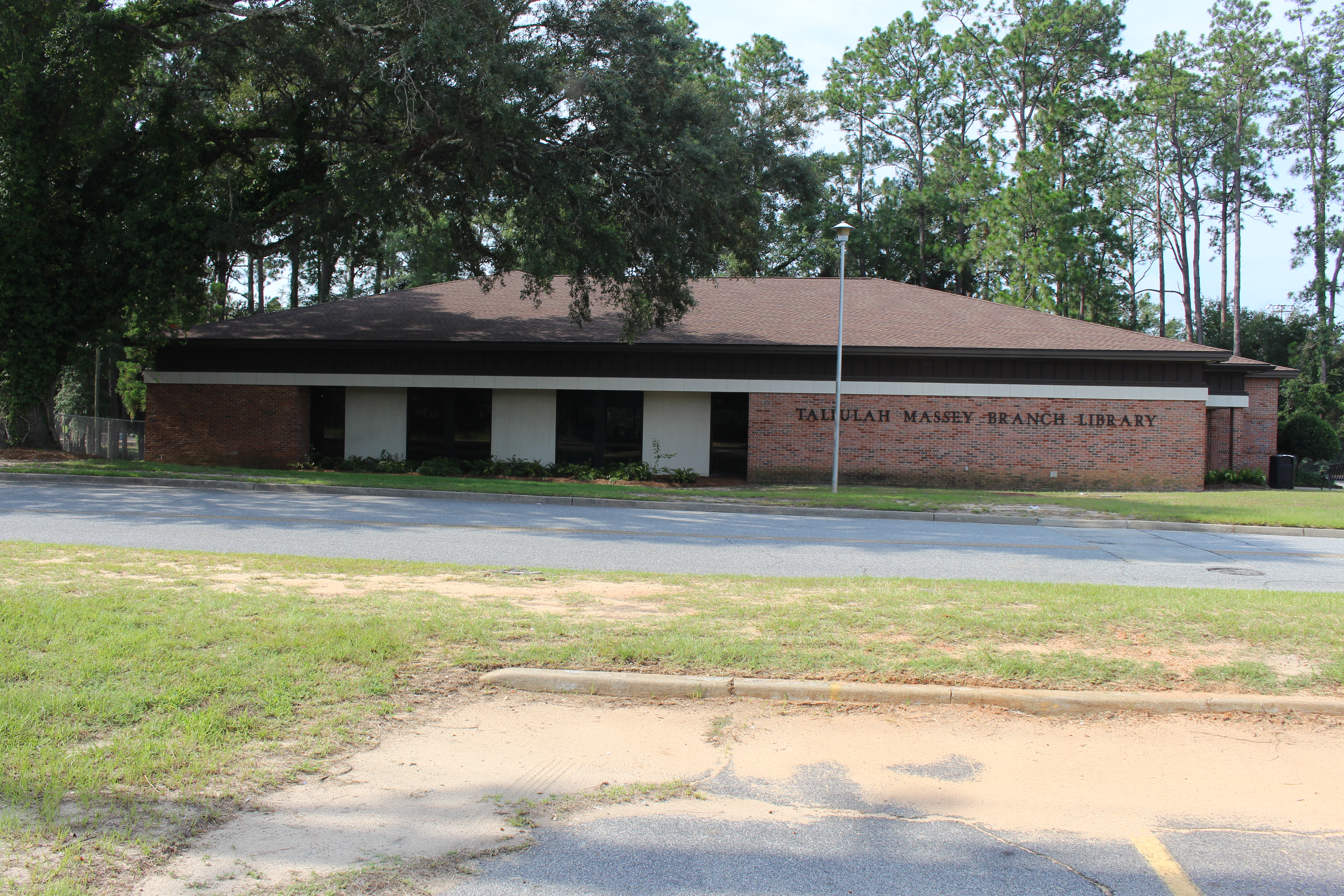
Tallulah Massey Branch Library

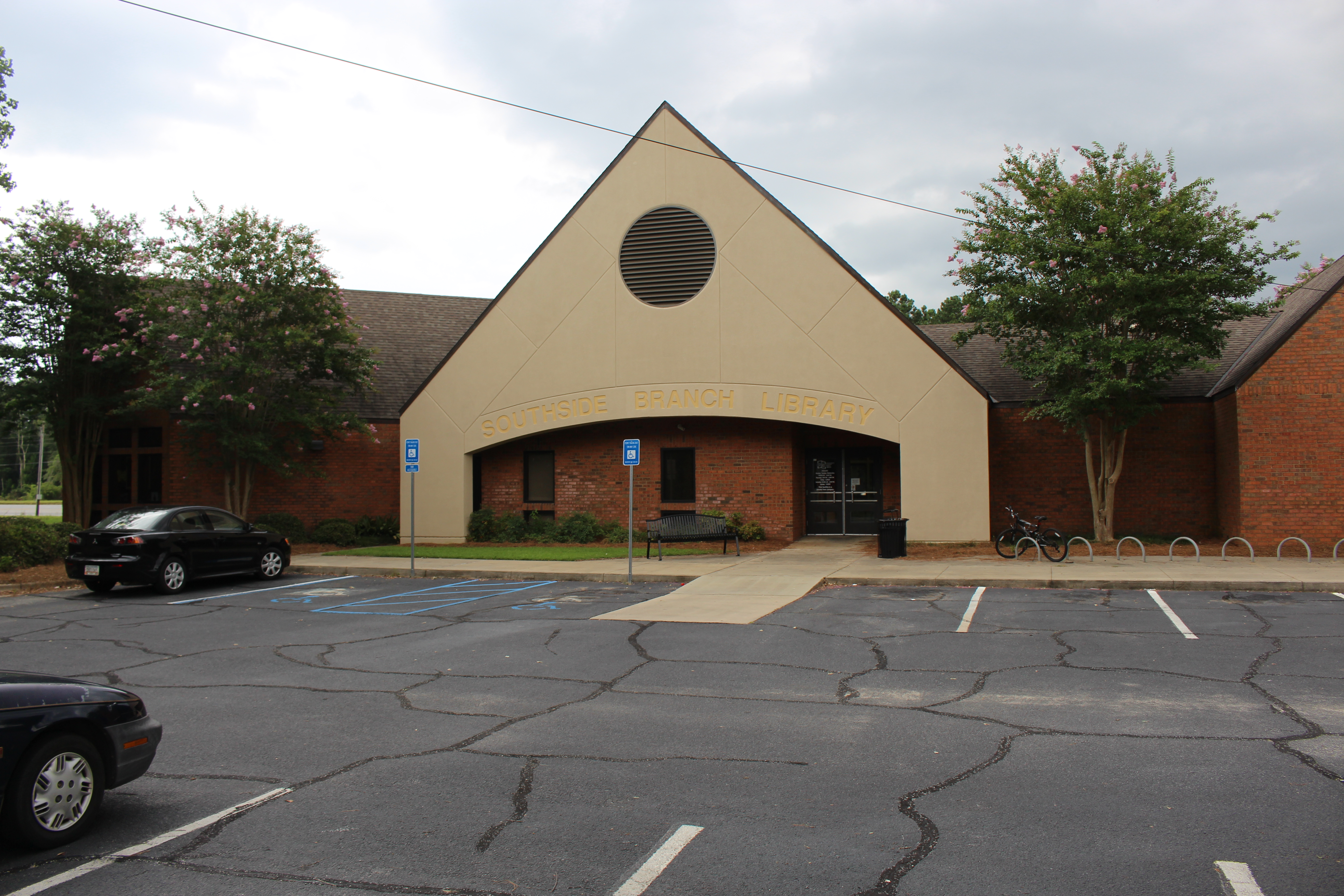
Southside Branch Library

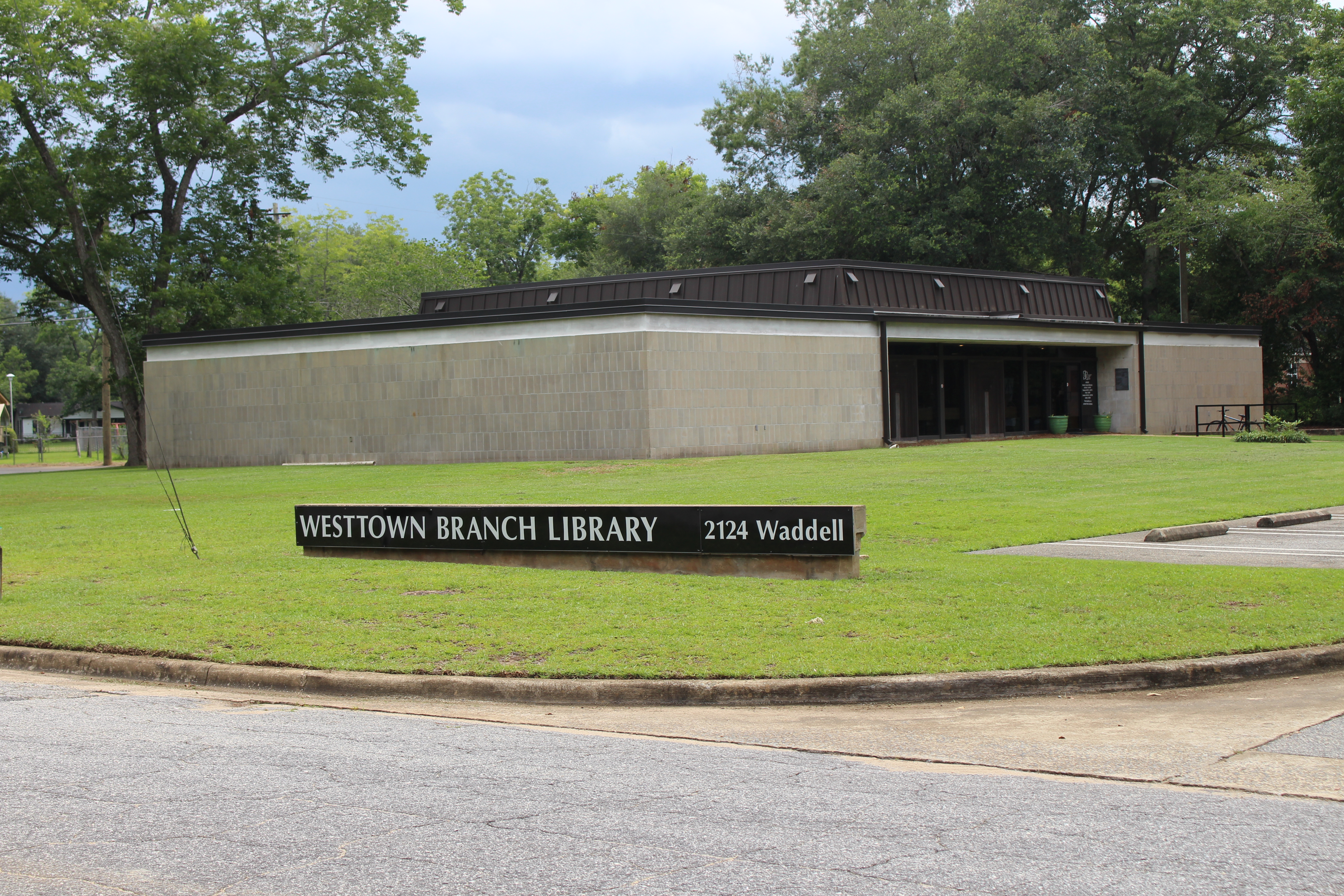
Westtown Branch Library

== Library systems in neighboring counties ==
- Lee County Library to the north
- Worth County Library System to the east
- De Soto Trail Regional Library System to the south
- Kinchafoonee Regional Library System to the west
