= Worth County Library System =

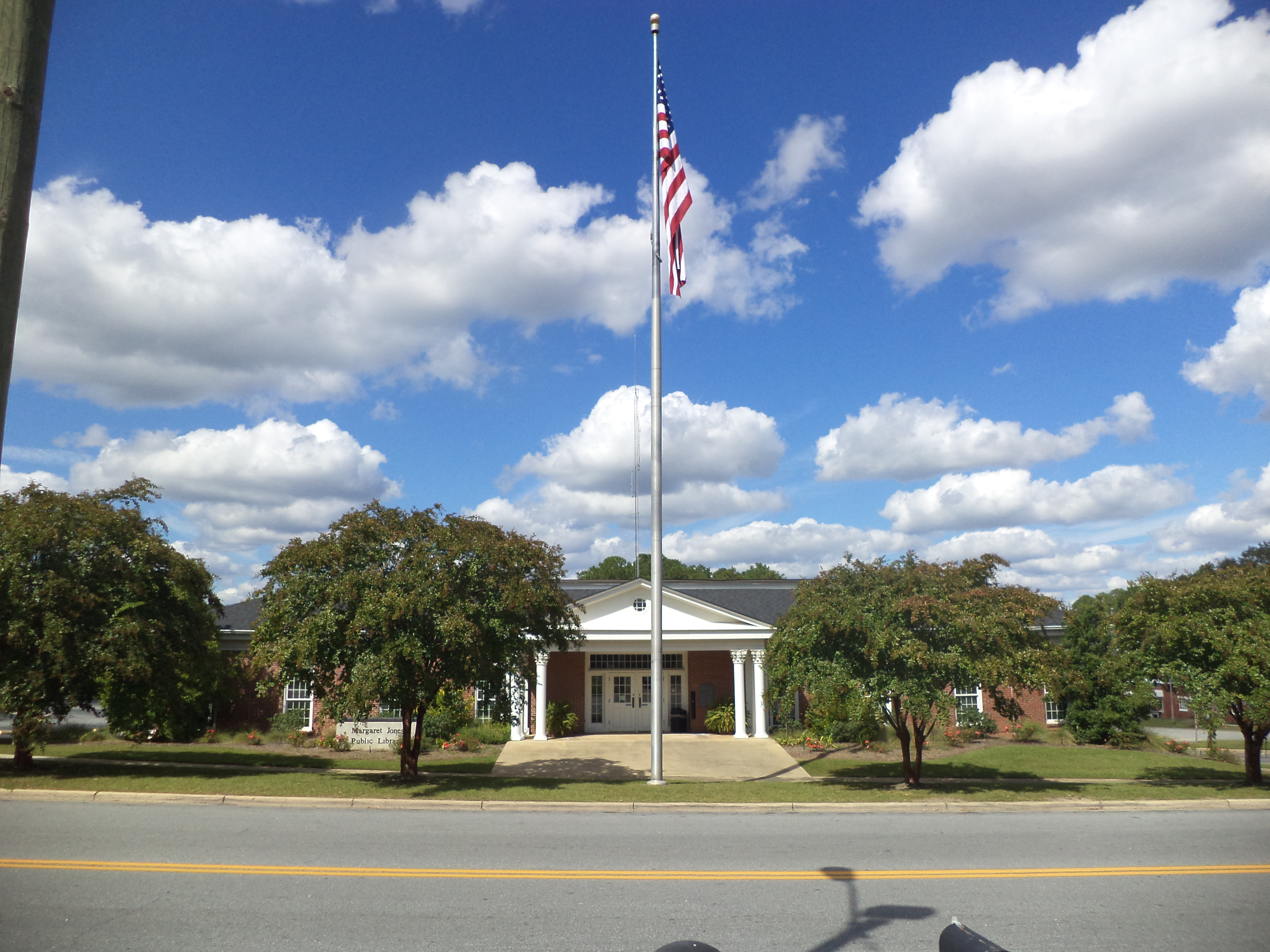
- The Margaret Jones Public Library
- Location: Worth County, Georgia
- Established: 1922
- Branches: 1

Collection
- Size: 53,043 (2016)

Access and use
- Circulation: 70,573 (2016)
- Population served: 21,208 (2016)
- Members: 6,502 (2016)

Other information
- Director: Leigh Wiley
- Website: http://www.worthlib.org/

The Worth County Library System is a public library system serving Worth County in the US state of Georgia. The system has one branch, the Sylvester-Margaret Jones Library, located in Sylvester.

In 2016 the library archived the entire collection of the Sylvester Local News and made it available online for public access.

Worth County Library is a member of PINES, a program of the Georgia Public Library Service that covers 53 library systems in 143 counties of Georgia. Any resident in a PINES supported library system has access to the system's collection of 10.6 million books. The library is also serviced by GALILEO, a program of the University System of Georgia which stands for "GeorgiA LIbrary LEarning Online". This program offers residents in supported libraries access to over 100 databases indexing thousands of periodicals and scholarly journals. It also boasts over 10,000 journal titles in full text.

== History ==
=== Early years ===
Despite currently fostering only one public library, Worth County historically had multiple libraries spanning different regional library systems. The first library of the system, the historic Poulan Library, was chartered via the Superior Court of Worth County in 1908 and was founded by the Poulan Woman's Club. It sits in a tiny concrete building along the highway through town and for many years was the only public library in Georgia, serving not only its town but the entire surrounding county.

The second known library of the system, the Sylvester Public Library, is the library still intact today. The concept for this library began in 1908 by citizens of Worth, but did not come to fruition until the Sylvester Woman's Club dedicated a space and collection for public use in 1919. Although it existed for a time as a library for public use, it was entirely run by the Woman's Club until it was formally dedicated to the county of Worth in February 1931. In 1938 the name was officially changed to the Sylvester Public Library, and by 1944 it began to receive more funding from the county and city as it joined the Worth County Board of Education and City of Sylvester Board of Commissioners.

=== Regional library ===
In 1952 the State of Georgia passed a law to the benefit of public libraries by offering more financial support if libraries created a regional system. Mitchell County and Baker County at this point had consolidated their collections, creating the Mitchell-Baker Regional Library system. The Sylvester-Worth County Public Library joined this service in 1954, creating a tri-county system, and with the addition of Early County later that same year, the regional system changed its name to the De Soto Trail Regional Library System.

While the status of the regional system was growing, room in the Sylvester Public Library was not. In May 1959, concerns of book overflow were brought up at a meeting of the Woman's Club, and the decision was made to look for funding for a new building. By that June, the local bank donated $200 to buy the unused Presbyterian church in town to be used as the library, and this decision was agreed upon by the library board. The church, initially built as a Methodist church in 1898, was renovated into a library space and dedicated to the public in 1960.

In 1978 the library had grown to a point where the Woman's Club was unable to keep up with its maintenance. The club voted to deed the library space to the City of Sylvester and the County of Worth in November. Plans were soon made to find another new library building, as the old church was quickly running out of space and was running into many structural problems. Funding was initiated in 1978 with monies raised through fundraising efforts and through allocations made by state senators. The Friends of the Library were established on June 21, 1984 and subsequently raised money via county-wide events. The State of Georgia further agreed to match at a 2 to 1 rate any private donations given by members of the county. In reaching their goal, construction of the new library began in late 1984. The building was completed and dedicated on November 22, 1987 as the Margaret Jones Public Library, named after the mother of two of the major donors to the library.

=== Formation of Worth County Library System ===
On July 1, 2008, the Margaret Jones Public Library left the DeSoto Trail Library System to form the Worth County Library System.

== Digital archive ==
In 2016 the Worth County Library System underwent an effort to scan and archive the entire collection of the Sylvester Local News, the county newspaper. The digital archive currently consists of newspapers from the last 125 years, dating from 1885 to 2013, with nearly 100,000 scans. The project cost $9,000 and was funded in part by the Georgia Public Library Service, private donations, and the Library Board of Trustees.

== Library systems in neighboring counties ==
- Lake Blackshear Regional Library System to the north
- Coastal Plain Regional Library System to the east
- Moultrie-Colquitt County Library System to the south
- De Soto Trail Regional Library System to the southwest
- Dougherty County Public Library to the west
- Lee County Library to the northwest
