= Brooks County Public Library =

Single branch public library system serving Brooks County, Georgia, USA

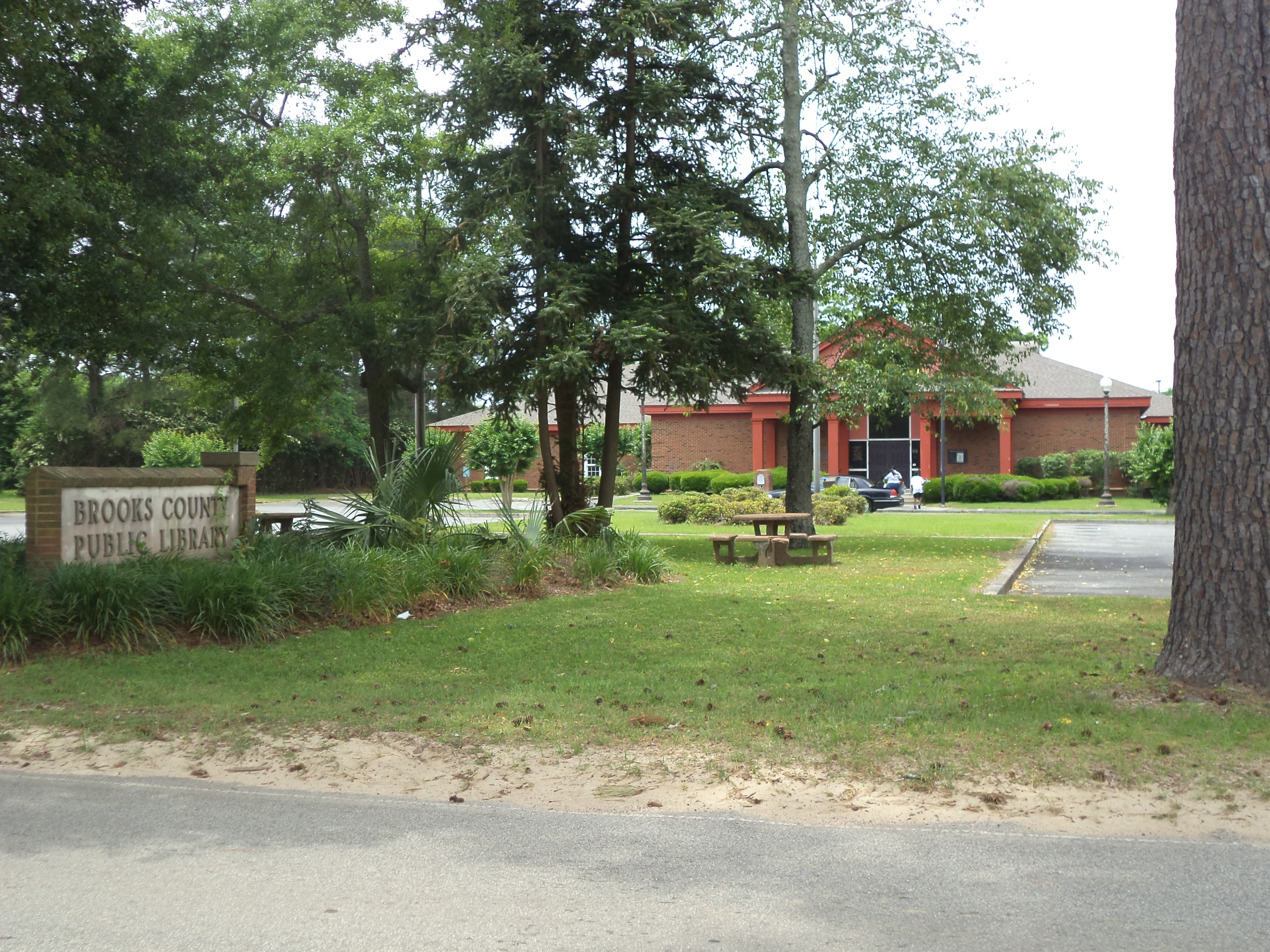
- The Brooks County Public Library
- 30°47′19.1616″N 83°34′14.8296″W
- Location: United States
- Established: 1880

Collection
- Size: 92,449 (2020)

Access and use
- Circulation: 11,522 (2020)
- Population served: 15,727 (2020)
- Members: 3,850 (2020)

Other information
- Director: Scott Routsong
- Website: http://www.brooks.public.lib.ga.us/

The Brooks County Public Library is a single-branch public library system serving Brooks County in the U.S. state of Georgia. The library is located in Quitman.

The library is a member of PINES, a program of the Georgia Public Library Service that covers 53 library systems in 143 counties of Georgia. Any resident in a PINES supported library system has access to the system's collection of 10.6 million books. The library is also serviced by GALILEO, a program of the University System of Georgia which stands for "GeorgiA LIbrary LEarning Online". This program offers residents in supported libraries access to over 100 databases indexing thousands of periodicals and scholarly journals. It also boasts over 10,000 journal titles in full text.

== History ==
=== Origins ===
A library in Quitman was first advocated for in 1873 by the Literacy and Debating Club, a group of young men in the town. Accordingly, dues of $5.00 per year were collected in order to raise money to establish a permanent library and collection. In 1877 the Quitman Library Association was born, and canvassed the town for book donations to use for their upcoming library. With growing interest and increased publicity of the future library, an editorial in the Free-Press wrote of the necessity of more organization to let the library up and running, and claimed that the previously made Library Association was not doing its best to secure a public library space. The editor of the paper charged the women of Quitman with putting together the library, promising a sum of $500 towards its completion, should they begin preparations right away. On January 31, 1880 the women of Quitman formed the Brooks County Public Library Association, and the Quitman Library was established.

As the library was founded in 1880, it is one of the oldest public libraries in the state. The Georgia Public Library Service, which was formed to aid the growth of the newly-made library across Georgia at the turn of the century, was not created for another 17 years.

At its start, the library existed in a free room by one of the citizens of Quitman, L. F. Haddock. Dues were ten cents per month for women and children, and twenty-five cents for men. Fundraising was very successful in the summer months to raise money to buy more books for the library. In September 1880 plans were made to create a two-story dedicated library building. Another fundraiser provided enough money to construct the building by 1881, bringing in over $1,000.

=== Search for a new library ===
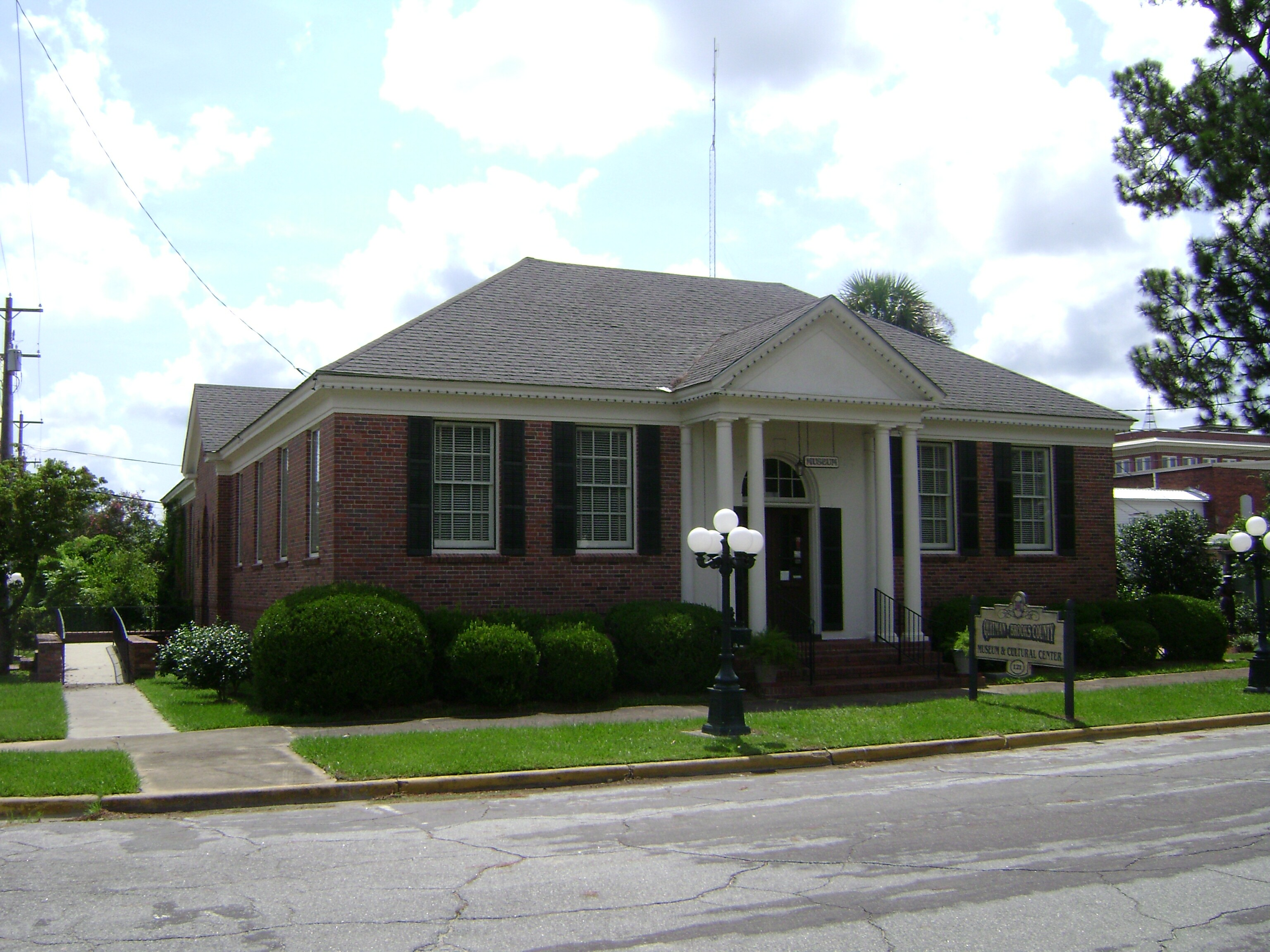
One of the former Brooks County libraries, now a museum

Dues to the library were substantial enough during its early years to meet the costs of upkeep and maintenance, but with a growing population of Quitman and a higher interest in the public library, lack of money started to become an issue. A local bill was passed to allow Brooks County to allocate $600 per year for library use, which solved this issue.

By 1911 the library had again outgrown its building. Surrounding counties at this time were being met with great success by petitioning industrialist Andrew Carnegie for funds to construct their own public libraries. Brooks County similarly requested $10,000 from Carnegie in 1911 and secured a grant from the Carnegie Library Fund. However, despite this Carnegie grant, the lowest bids for construction were $12,000, and the Library Board denied this increase, believing the Carnegie Fund was more than enough to construct their building. After no plans to secure the bid were found, the Carnegie Fund cancelled the gift in 1919. Still in need of a new library, the citizens now resorted to old methods of fundraising. To help, in 1917 the city of Quitman agreed to provide another $50 per month for library purposes. In 1925, Brooks County became the state's first county to pass a local bill authorizing the use of general county funds to support libraries. Funding also began to come in from various local clubs. The Quitman Woman's Club provided $2,000, and the United Daughters of the Confederacy and Daughters of the American Revolution promised another $300 yearly. With the advent of the Works Progress Administration, the county secured another $5,000 library grant. With adequate funding, the new building began construction in 1933. In 1939 it was recognized in a pamphlet by the American Library Association as one of the ideal "Small Library Buildings" in the county — the only one chosen in the entire Southeast.

The library continued to grow and receive proper funding over the next decade. In 1946 the library received $800 in state aid to increase its outreach to rural communities. To do so, a bookmobile was added to the library in 1948.

=== Modern years ===
In 1993 the library moved to its new location on Barwick Road. The grand opening was held in 1994.

== Library systems in neighboring counties ==
- Moultrie-Colquitt County Library System to the northwest
- Coastal Plain Regional Library System to the northeast
- South Georgia Regional Library to the east
- Thomas County Public Library System to the west
