= Roddenbery Memorial Library =

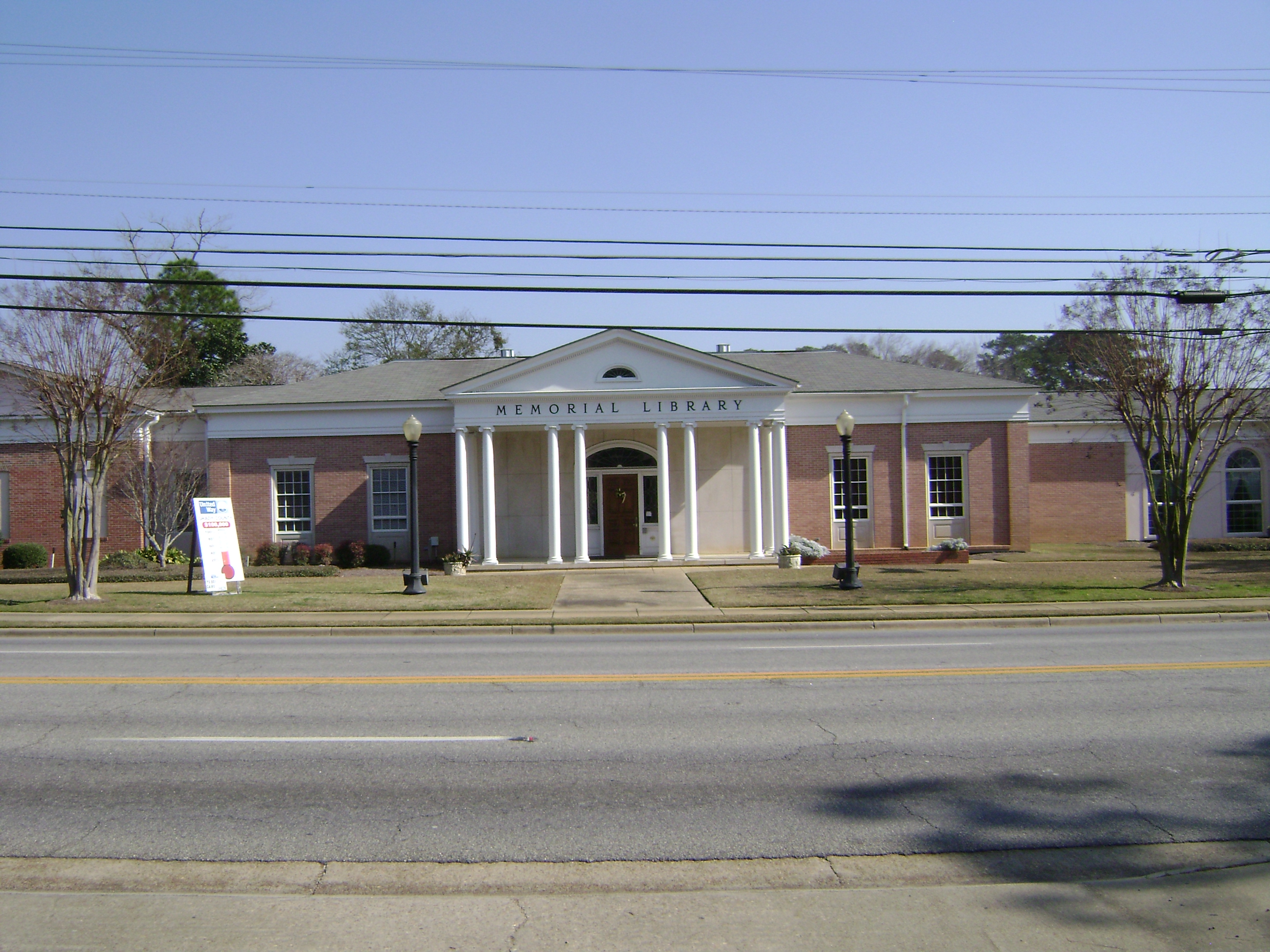
- The Roddenbery Memorial Library
- 30°52′46.4664″N 84°12′27.8856″W
- Location: Grady County, Georgia
- Established: 1939 (Cairo Library); 1964 (Roddenbery Library)
- Branches: 1

Collection
- Size: 80,371 (2016)

Access and use
- Circulation: 68,218 (2016)
- Population served: 25,902 (2016)
- Members: 9,118 (2016)

Other information
- Director: Karen Thompson
- Website: http://rmlibrary.org/

The Roddenbery Memorial Library (RML) is a single-branch public library system serving the county of Grady, located in the U.S.state of Georgia. The library is located in Cairo, Georgia.

RML is a member of PINES, a program of the Georgia Public Library Service that covers 53 library systems in 143 counties of Georgia. Any resident in a PINES supported library system has access to the system's collection of 10.6 million books. The library is also serviced by GALILEO, a program of the University System of Georgia which stands for "GeorgiA LIbrary LEarning Online". This program offers residents in supported libraries access to over 100 databases indexing thousands of periodicals and scholarly journals. It also boasts over 10,000 journal titles in full text.

== History ==
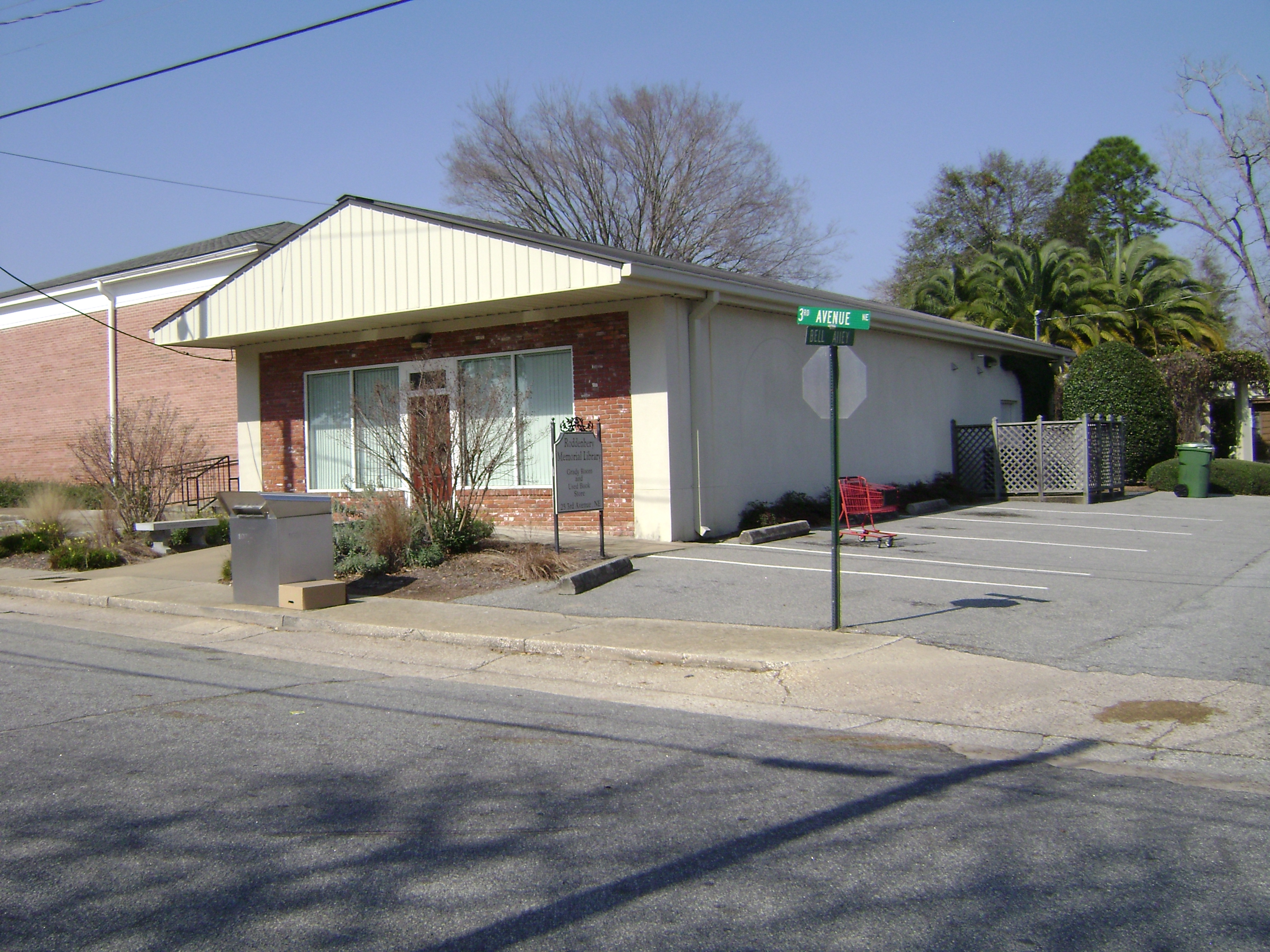
The Roddenbery Memorial Library Grady Room

The Roddenbery Memorial Library had its beginning in January 1939 when it was established as the Cairo Public Library. The initial housing for the first building was the second floor of City Hall.

In 1964 the library was granted a new building on North Broad Street in Cairo, as a gift from the Roddenbery family to the community. The library's name was then changed in honor of the family.

Since the library's founding in 1939 it has won the John Cotton Dana Award twice, in 1950 and 1960. This award is considered the most prestigious of all American Library Association awards in the field of public relations and marketing.

In 2023 the library was honored with the "Stephen T. Riedner Grant for Life Enhancing Library Programs for People Living with Dementia" award by the Reference and User Services Association of the American Library Association of the American Library Association for its Memory CARE Corner.

== Library systems in neighboring counties ==
- De Soto Trail Regional Library System to the north
- Thomas County Public Library System to the east
- Southwest Georgia Regional Library to the west
