= De Soto Trail Regional Library System =

Public library system in Georgia, U.S.

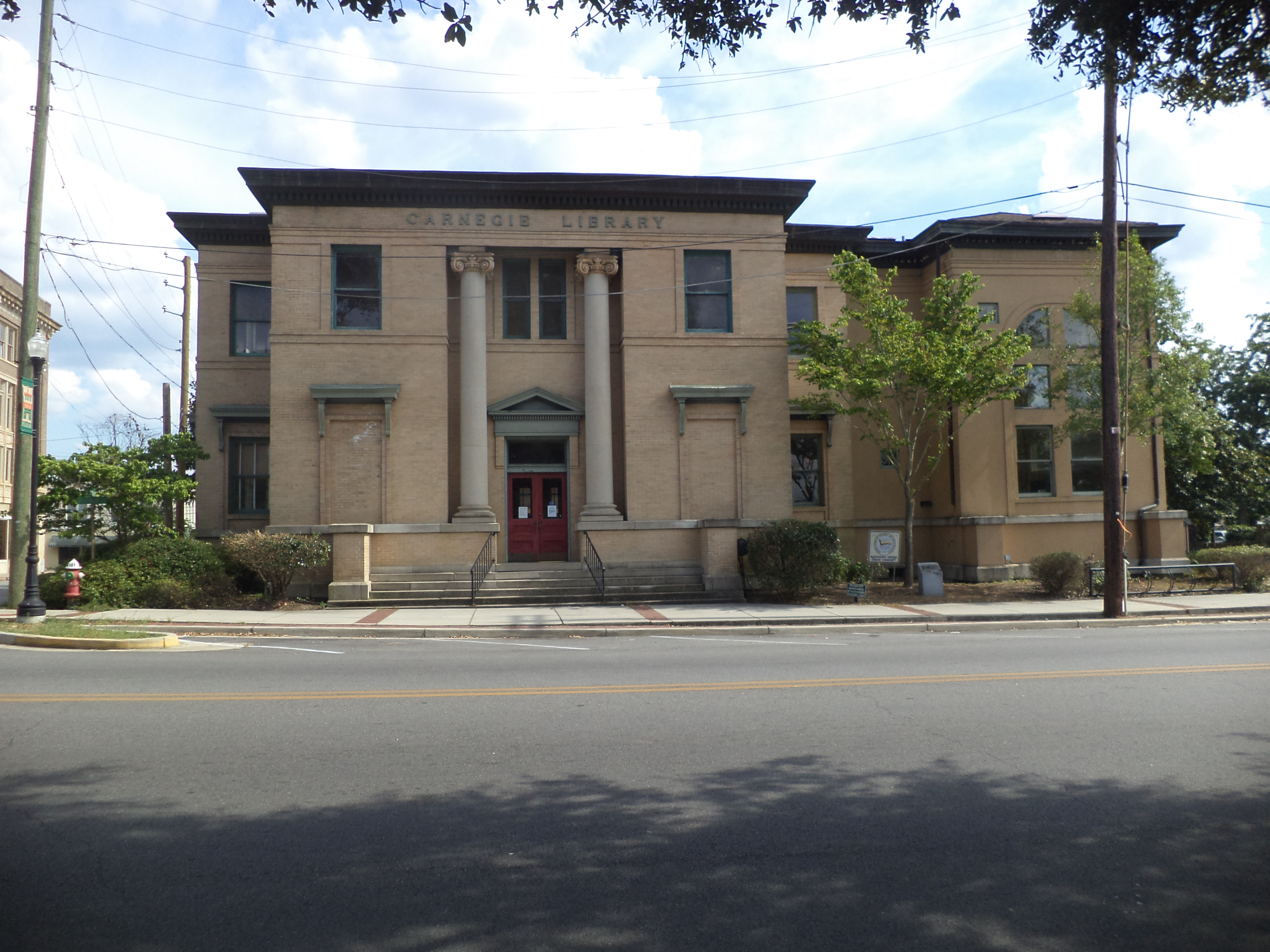
- The Pelham Carnegie Library
- Location: Southwest Georgia
- Branches: 6

Collection
- Size: 131,454 (2016)

Access and use
- Circulation: 84,464 (2016)
- Population served: 36,749 (2016)
- Members: 10,647 (2016)

Other information
- Director: Lisa Rigsby
- Website: http://www.desototrail.org/

The De Soto Trail Regional Library System is a public library system serving the counties of Mitchell, Baker, and Early, in the U.S. state of Georgia. The headquarters of the library system is the Camilla Public Library, located in Camilla.

The system is a member of PINES, a program of the Georgia Public Library Service that covers 53 library systems in 143 counties of Georgia. Any resident in a PINES supported library system has access to the system's collection of 10.6 million books. The library is also serviced by GALILEO, a program of the University System of Georgia which stands for "GeorgiA LIbrary LEarning Online". This program offers residents in supported libraries access to over 100 databases indexing thousands of periodicals and scholarly journals. It also boasts over 10,000 journal titles in full text.

== History ==
=== Pelham Carnegie Library ===
Looking to establish a public library in the town of Pelham, a library committee was formed and Andrew Carnegie was petitioned for funds to construct the building. On December 10, 1906, the Carnegie Foundation allowed Pelham $10,000 to construct their public library, on the condition the town pay an annual upkeep of 10% of the funded price. On January 13, 1907, the library committee agreed to the terms set forth by Carnegie and began construction of the building. The library was dedicated on July 1, 1908, and by 1911 had grown to hold a collection of 3,000 volumes with access to magazines and other periodicals, all for free for use by the general public.

The Pelham Carnegie building is one of the few original Carnegie libraries in the state of Georgia which has not undergone changes to the interior or exterior. Short of electrical repair in 1965, the library looks and functions much like it did when it first opened in 1908. Because of its historical significance and accuracy it is listed within the Pelham Commercial Historic District, a National Register Historic District.

== Branches ==
Name	Address
Baker County Library	398 Ga Hwy 37 SW, Newton, GA 39870
Camilla Public Library	145 East Broad Street, Camilla, GA 31730
Jakin Public Library	1091 S. Pearl Street, Jakin, GA 39861
Lucy Maddox Memorial Library	11880 Columbia Street, Blakely, GA 39823
Pelham Carnegie Library	133 Hand Avenue, Pelham, GA 31779
Sale City Public Library	154 Barnes Street, Sale City, GA 31784

== Library systems in neighboring counties ==
- Kinchafoonee Regional Library System to the north
- Dougherty County Public Library to the north
- Worth County Library System to the northeast
- Moultrie-Colquitt County Library System to the east
- Thomas County Public Library System to the southeast
- Roddenbery Memorial Library to the south
- Southwest Georgia Regional Library to the south
