= Moultrie-Colquitt County Library System =

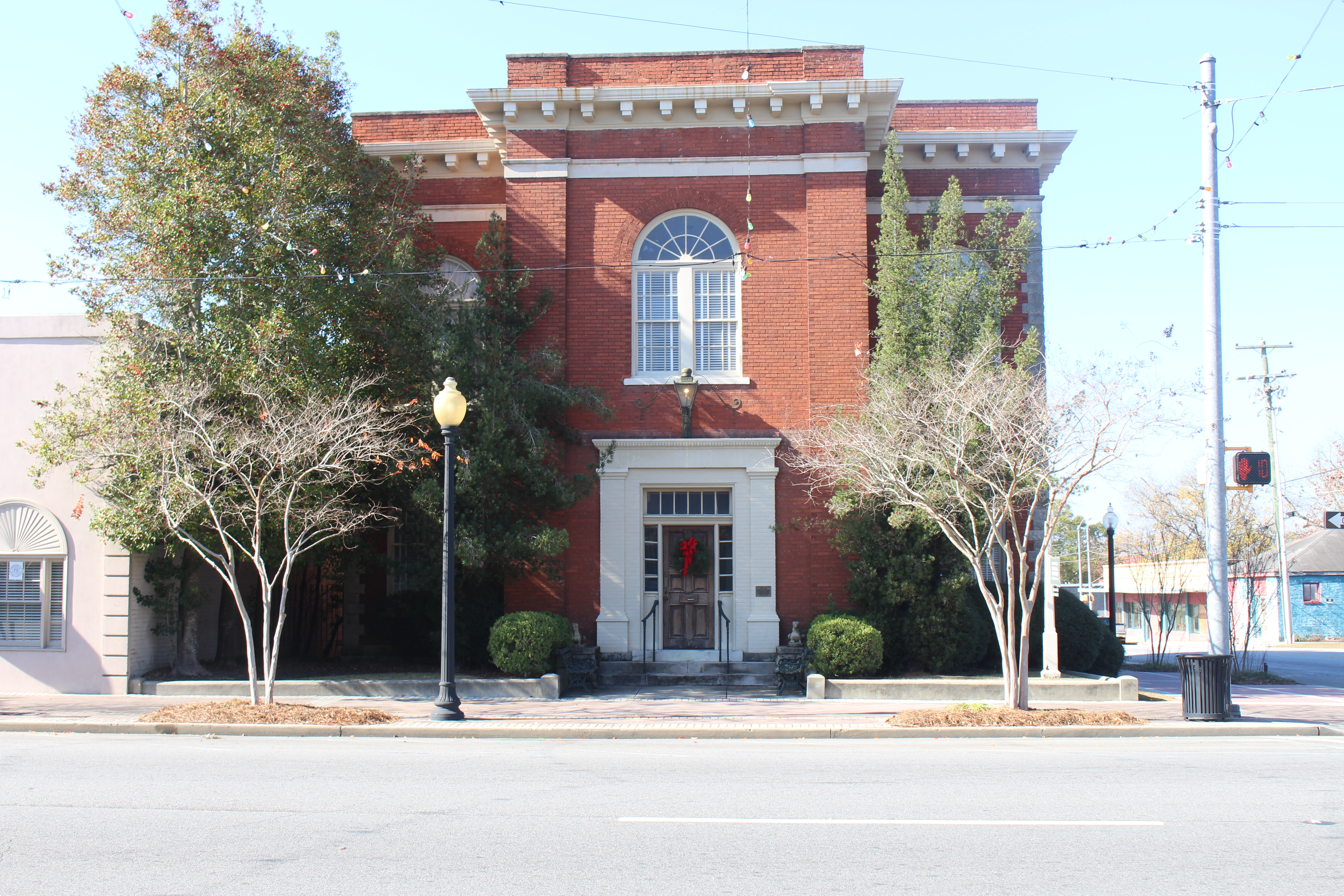
- The old Carnegie library in Colquitt County, Georgia
- Location: Moultrie County, Georgia
- Branches: 2

Collection
- Size: 132,668 (2016)

Access and use
- Circulation: 96,475 (2016)
- Population served: 47,715 (2016)
- Members: 13,248 (2016)

Other information
- Director: Kevin Ellis
- Website: http://www.mccls.org/

The Moultrie-Colquitt County Library System (MCCLS) is a public library system serving Colquitt County, in the U.S. state of Georgia. The headquarters of the library is located in Moultrie.

MCCLS is a member of PINES, a program of the Georgia Public Library Service that covers 53 library systems in 143 counties of Georgia. Any resident in a PINES supported library system has access to the system's collection of 10.6 million books. The library is also serviced by GALILEO, a program of the University System of Georgia which stands for "GeorgiA LIbrary LEarning Online". This program offers residents in supported libraries access to over 100 databases indexing thousands of periodicals and scholarly journals. It also boasts over 10,000 journal titles in full text.

== History ==
=== Carnegie Library ===
In 1906 the Commissioner of the Colquitt County Board of Education petitioned Andrew Carnegie for funds to construct a public library to serve the county. On December 3 of that year, Carnegie granted a donation of $10,000 to be used to library construction on the terms the city pay an annual maintenance fee of $1,000 towards keeping the building in good condition. A lot on the corner of West Broad and Crawford streets was purchased by library trustees and designated at the site for the library. The blueprints for the building called for a mixture of different architectural designs based primarily off Colonial Revival. In addition to space for the library's collection, an auditorium was included on the second floor to "provide for meetings of a social and literary character in connection with a library association." The building was used at a library until it was sold in 1973 to be renovated into law offices. In 1982 it was placed on the National Register of Historic Places.

=== County library system ===
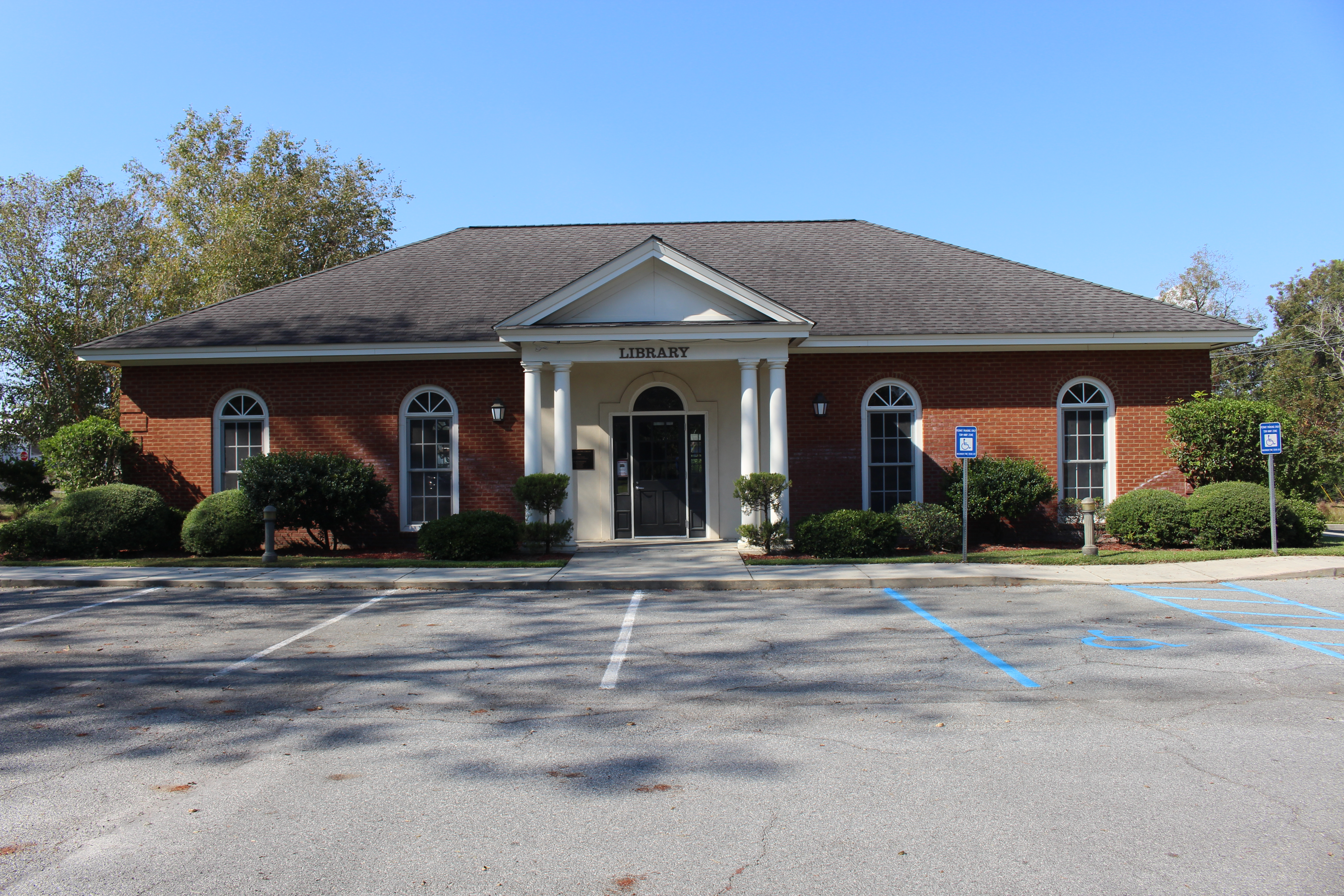
The Doerun Municipal Library

As library service grew in Moultrie, a bookmobile service was launched in the mid-1950s to increase outreach for rural areas. By 2016 this service was reaching over 1,200 people each year from municipalities far from the county library.

Owing to a lack of space in the Carnegie Library, plans began in the 1960s to construct a new, larger library complex. Known today as the Moultrie-Colquitt County Library, the new building was opened in 1964.

The library is home to a second branch, the Doerun Municipal Library, located in Doerun.

== Library systems in neighboring counties ==
- Worth County Library System to the north
- Coastal Plain Regional Library System to the northeast
- Brooks County Public Library to the southeast
- Thomas County Public Library System to the southwest
- De Soto Trail Regional Library System to the west
