= Lake Blackshear Regional Library System =

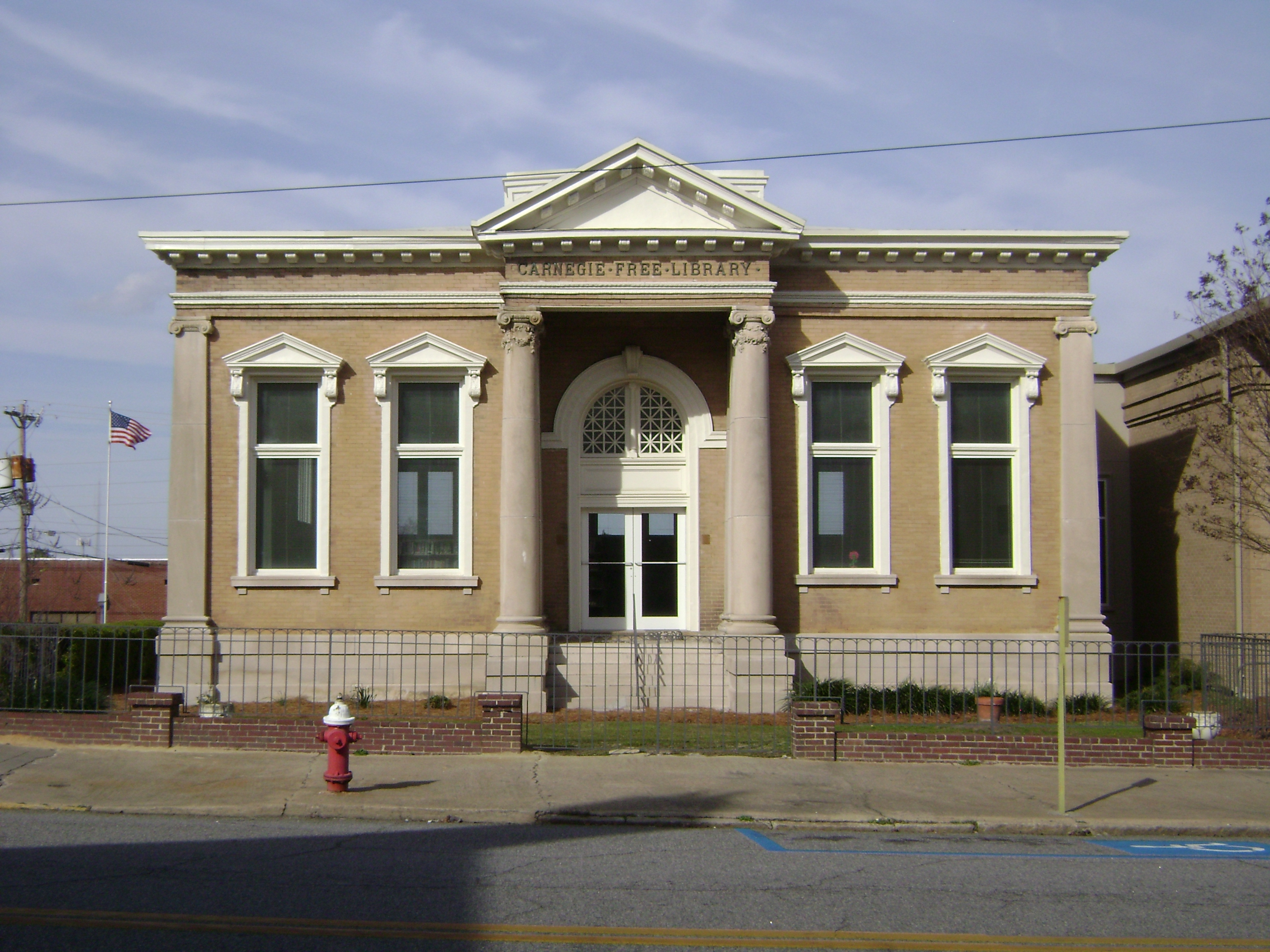
- The Cordele Carnegie Library
- Location: Sumter, Crisp, Dooly, Schley Counties, Georgia
- Established: 1964
- Branches: 6

Collection
- Size: 262,896 (2016)

Access and use
- Circulation: 103,433 (2016)
- Population served: 73,898 (2016)
- Members: 22,146 (2016)

Other information
- Director: Anne M. Isbell
- Website: https://www.lbrls.org/

The Lake Blackshear Regional Library System (LBRLS) is a public library system covering the four counties of Sumter, Crisp, Dooly, Schley, Georgia, United States. The Lake Blackshear Headquarters Library is located in Americus. The system is also home to the second oldest Carnegie library in Georgia, located in Cordele.

LBRLS is a member of PINES, a program of the Georgia Public Library Service that covers 53 library systems in 143 counties of Georgia. Any resident in a PINES supported library system has access to the system's collection of 10.6 million books. The library is also serviced by GALILEO, a program of the University System of Georgia which stands for "GeorgiA LIbrary LEarning Online". This program offers residents in supported libraries access to over 100 databases indexing thousands of periodicals and scholarly journals. It also boasts over 10,000 journal titles in full text.

== Carnegie libraries ==
=== Cordele ===
The Lake Blackshear Regional Library System is home to the second oldest Carnegie library in the state of Georgia. The building was constructed via a $17,550 grant from Andrew Carnegie in 1903 and was dedicated the following year. As with all Carnegie libraries in the United States, the Carnegie Foundation dissociated itself from the building after funding was provided. Thus further requests for more money were often denied outright. The Cordele Carnegie library is one of the few buildings in the country which reversed this trend and received a second fund, albeit at a lower amount than originally requested and only after the head of the Georgia Library Commission herself petitioned the Carnegie Foundation. Explaining that the library was not large enough to hold the collection, an additional grant of $7,556 was given to the county to renovate and expand the building.

=== Americus ===
The Americus chapter of the Daughters of the Revolution similarly petitioned Carnegie in 1908 for funds to construct their own public library. The town was gifted $20,000, considerably more than many other grants throughout the country, and with this money designed a two-story building with an auditorium on the top floor. The Daughters additionally hosted many events, including a masquerade ball, in order to raise funding for books for the new library. The auditorium was the cause of some contention between the Carnegie Foundation and the designers of the building, but Carnegie agreed to include it in the building plans after previous libraries were shown to have auditoriums included in their plans. The collection was eventually moved out of the library when the new regional headquarters was built and now exists as a commercial business.

== Branches ==
In 2008 the system joined PINES, a statewide library that shares its circulation among most of the library systems in Georgia.

Name	Address
Lake Blackshear Regional Library	307 East Lamar Street, Americus, 31709
Cordele-Crisp Carnegie Library	115 East 11th Avenue, Cordele, 31010-0310
Dooly County Library	1200 East Union Street, Vienna, 31092
Elizabeth Harris Library	312 Harman Street, Unadilla, 31091
Byromville Public Library	452 Main Street, Byromville, 31007
Schley County Library	54 South Broad Street, Ellaville, 31806

== Library systems in neighboring counties ==
- Middle Georgia Regional Library System to the north
- Houston County Public Library System to the northeast
- Ocmulgee Regional Library System to the east
- Coastal Plain Regional Library System to the southeast
- Worth County Library System to the south
- Lee County Library to the south
- Kinchafoonee Regional Library System to the southwest
- Chattahoochee Valley Libraries to the west
- Pine Mountain Regional Library System to the northwest
