= Kinchafoonee Regional Library System =

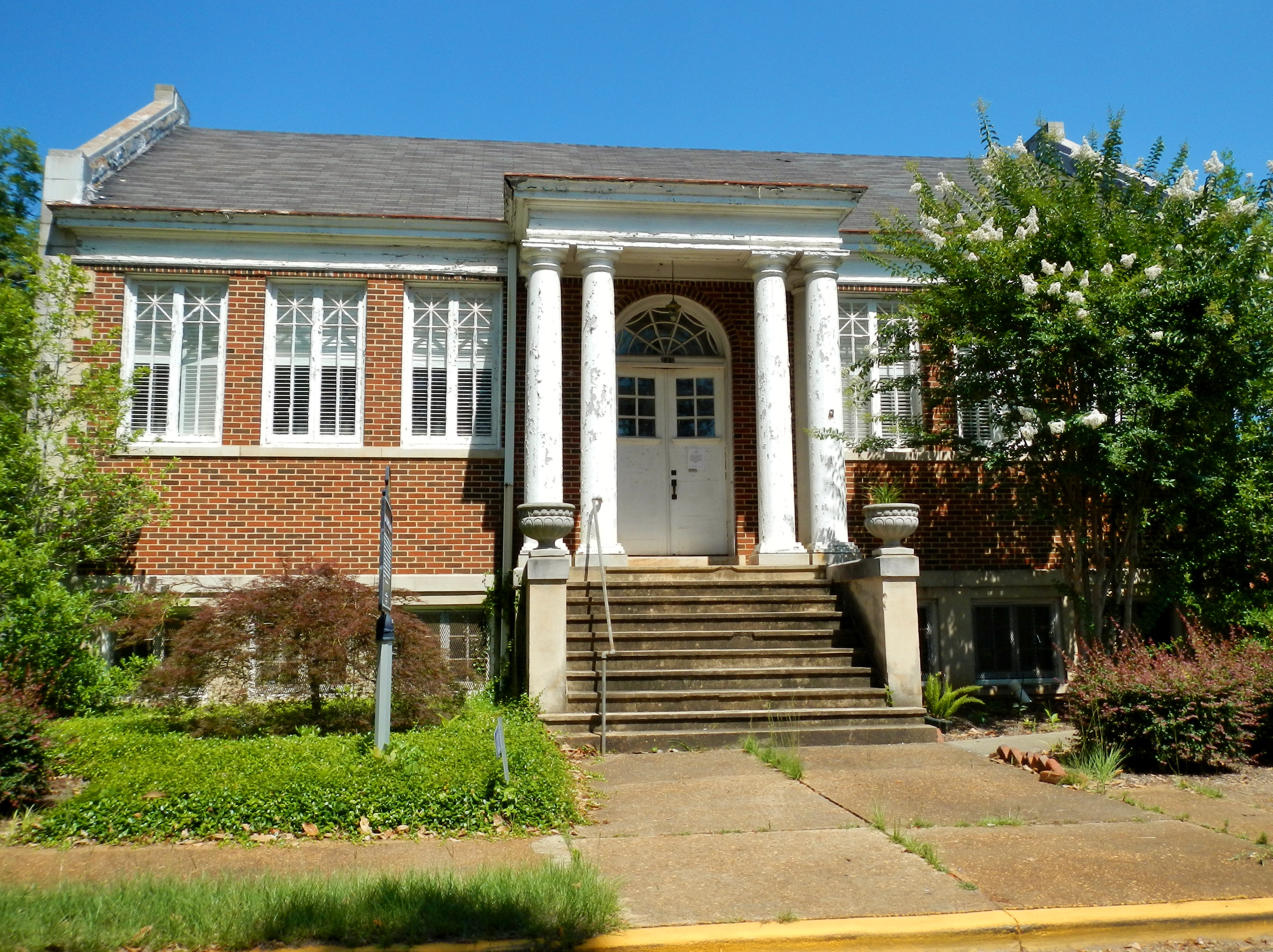
- The Old Carnegie Library in Cuthbert, Georgia
- Location: Southwest Georgia
- Established: 1950s
- Branches: 6

Collection
- Size: 122,982 (2016)

Access and use
- Circulation: 55,469 (2016)
- Population served: 30,339 (2016)
- Members: 11,816 (2016)

Other information
- Director: Coty Dees
- Website: http://krlibrary.org/

The Kinchafoonee Regional Library System (KRLS) is a public library system serving the counties of Calhoun, Clay, Quitman, Randolph, Terrell, and Webster, in the state of Georgia. The headquarters of the library system is the Terrell County Public Library in Dawson.

KRLS is a member of PINES, a program of the Georgia Public Library Service that covers 53 library systems in 143 counties of Georgia. Any resident in a PINES supported library system has access to the system's collection of 10.6 million books. The library is also serviced by GALILEO, a program of the University System of Georgia which stands for "GeorgiA LIbrary LEarning Online". This program offers residents in supported libraries access to over 100 databases indexing thousands of periodicals and scholarly journals. It also boasts over 10,000 journal titles in full text.

== Carnegie libraries ==
The Dawson Library Association was formed in 1906 as an outgrowth of the Wednesday Afternoon Club. The members of the group purportedly "loved literature and desired to do something permanent." For the initial years the library was housed in the upstairs of a drug store in town, though this was moved to the city council room over the fire department by around 1910.

During the 1950s and 1960s the regional system began adding library service to more counties. Calhoun County joined the system in 1953, and Lee County in 1954. Both Randolph and Webster counties joined in 1961, and the last county to join the system was Clay County in 1966. In 1995 Lee County Library left the system to create its own single county public library service.

=== Cuthbert Carnegie Library ===
At the turn of the 20th century industrialist Andrew Carnegie began investing money into public libraries throughout the United States. In 1913 the Woman's Club of Cuthbert, realizing a need for a library in town, petitioned Carnegie for funds to construct their own public library. On May 17, 1912 the club heard back from the Carnegie Foundation and were awarded $7,000 to construct the building on the condition the town of Cuthbert pay $700 per year for maintenance and upkeep from then on. Construction of the building commenced on October 17, 1917 and finished the following year on September 5, 1918. This library was used until 1997 when Randolph County constructed a new building in Cuthbert Square. The building is currently used to house the Randolph County Chamber of Commerce.

=== Dawson Carnegie Library ===
A second Carnegie building, located in Dawson, was once part of the Kinchafoonee Regional Library System. On March 14, 1913 there is evidence of the Carnegie foundation providing the town of Dawson $10,000 to construct a public library, again on the condition the library pay a 10% yearly maintenance and upkeep fee, in this instance of $1,000. The process to obtain the grant was somewhat complicated, as the town exaggerated its census size in order to secure a larger building and already had its own subscription-based library which some members of the Carnegie Foundation found to be perfectly suitable for Dawson. Nevertheless funding was provided after communication between the townspeople and the Carnegie Foundation. The building was completed in 1914 and was named the Dawson library initially, though it changed its name to the Kinchafoonee Regional Library upon the establishment of the library system. A partial restoration of the building took place in 1957 to add an annex for increased book space. Ultimately the Carnegie library discontinued use in 1999 when a new building was constructed to house the collection elsewhere in Dawson County, at the site of the present county library. This property is currently rented for use by various civic groups.

== Branches ==
Name	Address
Calhoun County Library	227 East Hartford Street, Edison, GA 39846
Clay County Library	208 South Hancock Street, Fort Gaines, GA 39851
Quitman County Library	39 Old School Road, Georgetown, GA 39854
Randolph County Library	200 East Pearl Street, Cuthbert, GA 39840
Terrell County Public Library	913 Forrester Drive SE, Dawson, GA 39842
Webster County Library	572 Washington Street, Preston, GA 31824

== Library systems in neighboring counties ==
- Chattahoochee Valley Libraries to the north
- Lake Blackshear Regional Library System to the northeast
- Lee County Library to the east
- Dougherty County Public Library to the southeast
- De Soto Trail Regional Library System to the south
