= Pine Mountain Regional Library System =

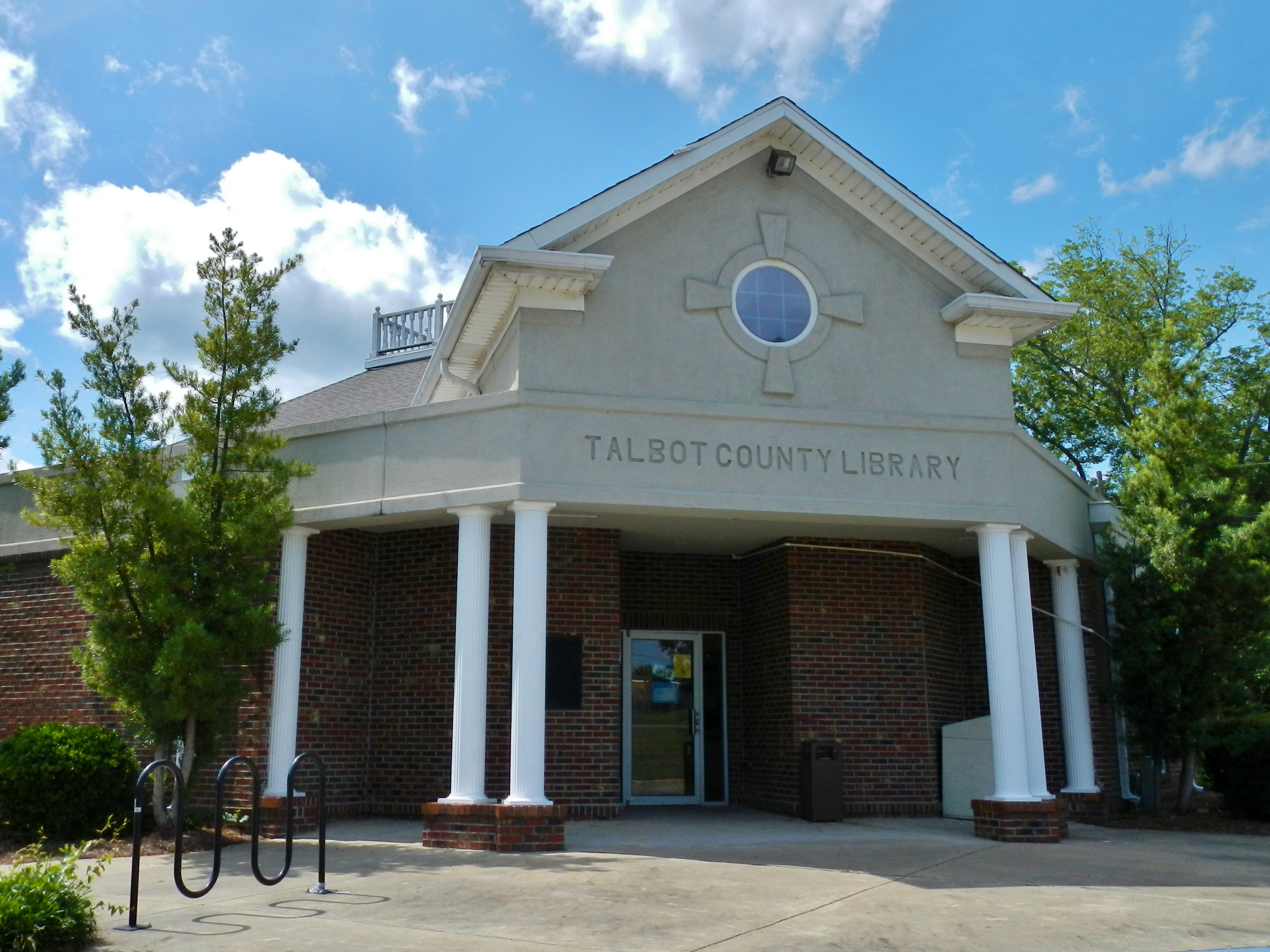
- Talbot County Public Library
- Location: West-Central Georgia
- Established: 1958
- Branches: 7

Collection
- Size: 132,026 (2016)

Access and use
- Circulation: 95,597 (2016)
- Population served: 62,463 (2016)
- Members: 14,949 (2016)

Other information
- Director: Cynthia S. Kilby
- Website: http://www.pinemtnlibrary.org/

The Pine Mountain Regional Library System is a group of seven public libraries that serve Meriwether, Upson, Talbot, and Taylor counties in Georgia, United States. The library regional headquarters is located in Manchester, Georgia.

Pine Mountain Library is a member of PINES, a program of the Georgia Public Library Service that covers 53 library systems in 143 counties of Georgia. Any resident in a PINES supported library system has access to the system's collection of 10.6 million books. The library is also serviced by GALILEO, a program of the University System of Georgia which stands for "GeorgiA LIbrary LEarning Online". This program offers residents in supported libraries access to over 100 databases indexing thousands of periodicals and scholarly journals. It also boasts over 10,000 journal titles in full text.

== History ==
The first library in the region was started in 1938 in Manchester, Georgia, and was sponsored by both the Woman's Club of Manchester as well as the city. Initially this library was located at the police station and housed 100 volumes that were borrowed from the state of Georgia.

In Meriwether County, the first library was chartered in 1950. The following year neighboring counties Talbot and Upson agreed to add their collections to the growing collection of Meriwether, and thus formed a regional library system. With the addition of Taylor County in 1958 the name of the library was changed to its present form.

In 1972 a need for new buildings arose and three new libraries were constructed in Butler, Talbotton, and Greenville. By the next year another library branch opened in Thomaston. This branch moved in 1980 and was rededicated as the Hightower Memorial Library.

In 1994 the Butler and Greenville libraries each received their own new buildings. The headquarters library, which was previously moved to the basement of the county community building, received a renovation and enlargement of its own in 1995. The newest library finished construction in 2002 in Yatesville.

== Branches ==
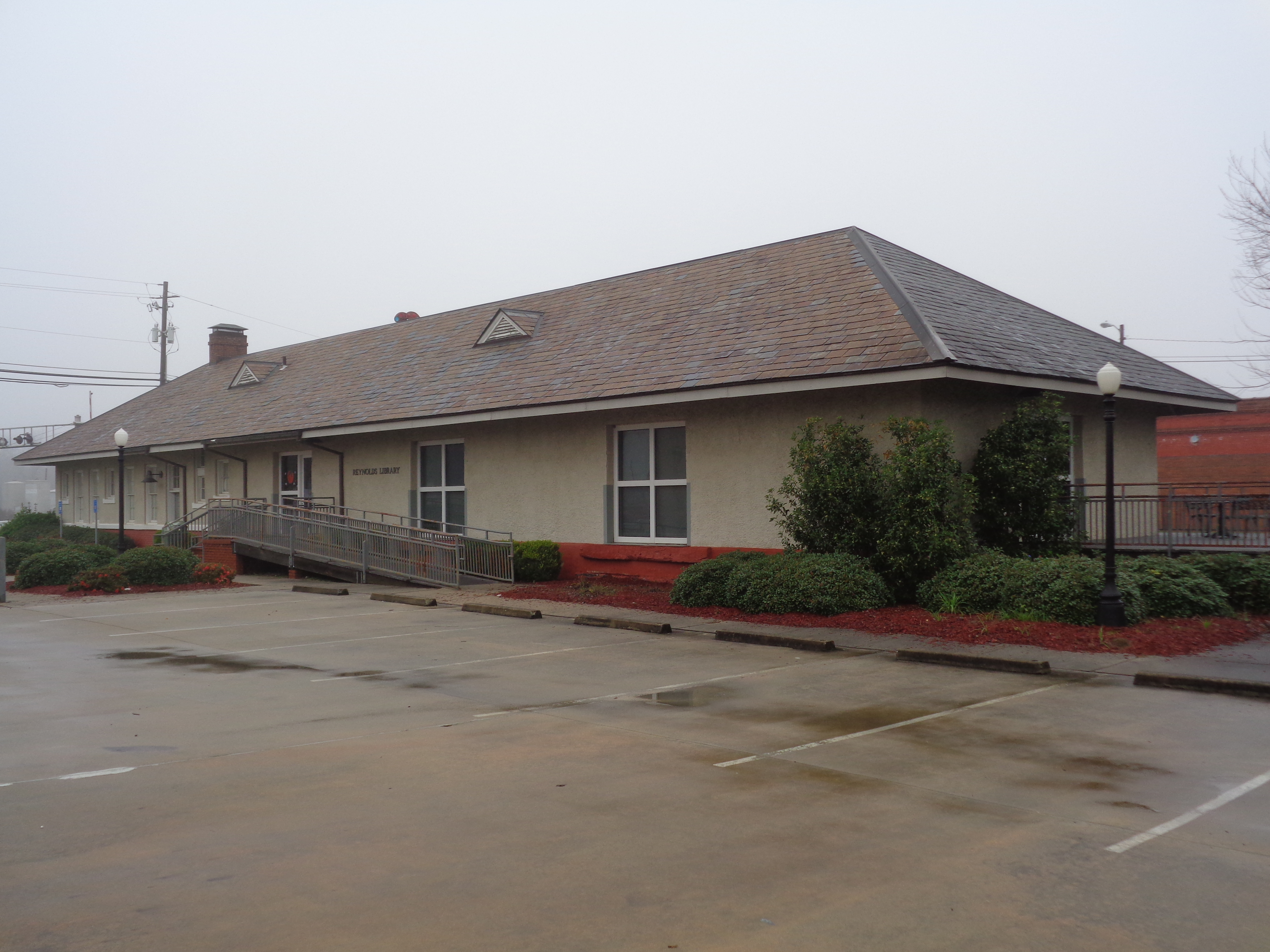
The Reynolds Community Library

Name	Address
Butler Public Library	56 West Main Street, Butler, Georgia 31006
Greenville Area Public Library	2323 Gilbert Street, Greenville, Georgia 30222
Hightower Memorial Library	800 West Gordon Street, Thomaston, Georgia 30286
Manchester Public Library	218 Perry Street, Manchester, GA 31816
Reynolds Community Library	101 Winston Street, Reynolds, Georgia 31076
Talbot County Library	175 North Jefferson Street, Talbotton, Georgia 31827
Yatesville Public Library	77 Childs Ave, Yatesville, Georgia 31097

== Library systems in neighboring counties ==
- Coweta Public Library System to the north
- Flint River Regional Library System to the northeast
- Middle Georgia Regional Library System to the west
- Lake Blackshear Regional Library System to the south
- Chattahoochee Valley Libraries to the southwest
- Troup-Harris Regional Library to the west
