= Chattahoochee Valley Libraries =

Public library consortium in Georgia, U.S.

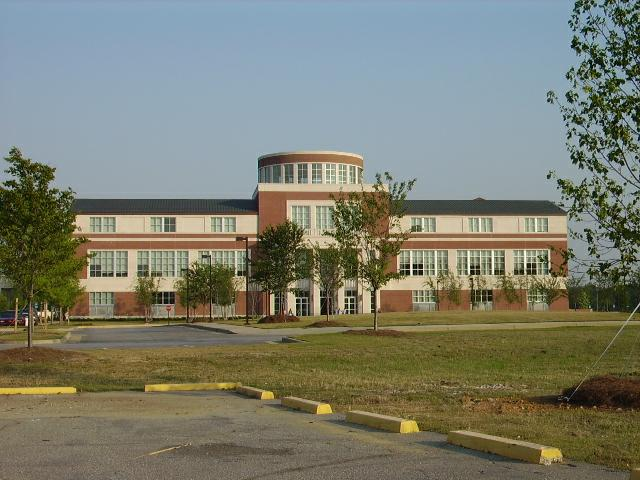
- Columbus Public Library
- Location: Columbus metropolitan area, Georgia
- Branches: 7

Collection
- Size: 376,543 (2020)

Access and use
- Circulation: 998,365 (2020)
- Population served: 223,071 (2020)
- Members: 70,755 (2020)

Other information
- Director: Alan Harkness
- Website: http://www.cvlga.org/

The Chattahoochee Valley Libraries (CVL) are a consortium of public libraries serving the Greater Columbus area of Georgia, United States. The library system consists of seven branches over four counties, Muscogee, Chattahoochee, Marion, and Stewart, Georgia. The headquarters of the library system is the Columbus Public Library located in the county seat, Columbus.

The Chattahoochee Valley Libraries run their own interlibrary loan system throughout the four counties. Residents of any county covered in the system may apply for a card granting them access to the circulation's 412,000 book collection.

== History ==
History of a library in Columbus, Georgia reaches back to 1832 when the Columbus Enquirer stated, "We have three churches, a theatre, a book store, and a circulating library." This is the earliest known library in the region until after the Civil War, in 1881, when the book and music clubs of the city merged to established the Columbus Public Library.

The next phase of the library was concerned with the construction of a dedicated building to house the collection. In 1902 Nina Holstead, a Columbus native, petitioned Andrew Carnegie for funds to erect a library downtown. Carnegie offered $30,000 for the building under the condition the city of Columbus pay for the maintenance costs, which was to be 10% of the initial donation amount. The library was opened in a centrally located area of the city, known as Mott's Green, on October 15, 1907. This location was used until 1950 with the construction of the William C. Bradley Memorial Library which was created to house the library collection which no longer fit in the original Carnegie building. Today the Carnegie library is used as office space.

=== Black library use ===
In 1910, despite the black population making up more than 37% of the overall population of Columbus, segregation laws made the Carnegie library use restricted to whites only. Blacks in Columbus had access to private collections of books from prominent black citizens in the county, but didn't have access to a public library until 1938 when the Works Progress Administration and Columbus Public Library began a summer reading program open to both white and black students. The black community showed a lot of interest in public library use after the WPA withdrew in 1941, and the Columbus Public Library opened a "Negro-only" branch called the Spencer High School Library in 1944. Due to intense interest and subsequent overcrowding more libraries were made to serve the black community. A branch was opened inside a converted one-bedroom unit of the Booker T. Washington Apartments in 1945. In 1953, the Fourth Avenue Branch Library opened as the first and only dedicated building for a segregated Black-only branch. Following integration in the 1960s, the Fourth Avenue branch was renamed the Mildred L. Terry Branch Library in 1981 in honor of one of its first two librarians, and its original building was demolished and replaced with a new building in 2009.

== Branches ==
Name	Address
Columbus Public Library	3000 Macon Road, Columbus, GA 31906
Cusseta-Chattahoochee Public Library	262 Broad Street, Cusseta, GA 31903
Marion County Library	123 East 5th Avenue, Buena Vista, GA 31803
Mildred L. Terry Branch Library	640 Veterans Parkway, Columbus, GA 31901
North Columbus Branch Library	5689 Armour Road, Columbus, GA 31909
Parks Memorial Public Library	112 Wall Street, Richland, GA 31825
South Columbus Branch Library	2034 South Lumpkin Road, Columbus, GA 31903

== Library systems in neighboring counties ==
- Troup-Harris Regional Library to the north
- Pine Mountain Regional Library System to the northeast
- Lake Blackshear Regional Library System to the east
- Kinchafoonee Regional Library System to the south
