= ARLS =

ARLS may refer to:

== Library systems ==
- Athens Regional Library System, in Athens, GA.
- Azalea Regional Library System, in Central GA
