= Kay Angliss =

Canadian artist

Katherine Margaret "Kay" Angliss (1923–2004) was a Canadian artist.

She was born on a farm in Port Coquitlam and grew up in British Columbia. Angliss graduated from the Vancouver School of Art in 1946, continuing her studies at the Emma Lake Art School in Saskatchewan, the University of Calgary and the Alberta College of Art. She taught at the Alberta College of Art from 1965 to 1980. She also taught art classes for children at the Allied Arts Centre in Calgary from 1960 to 1974. In 1987, Angliss was appointed a Life Member of the Alberta Society of Artists. In 1994, she was a recipient of the Royal Canadian Academy's Trust Fund. She is best known for her prints but also worked in watercolour and fibre art.

She married visual artist George Angliss.

Angliss and her husband left Alberta for British Columbia in 1989.

Her work is included in the collections of the Alberta Foundation for the Arts, Alberta House in London, England, Kelowna Art Gallery and the Confederation Centre Art Gallery in Charlottetown.

Angliss's work continues to be shown. The Art Gallery of Grande Prairie included Angliss's work in "The Printmakers: Abstract Prints from the 1960's and 70's" curated by Todd Schaber in 2014, and, in 2021, Angliss's work was include in Cochrane Public Library's exhibit "Figured" including the work of twelve Canadian artists including Marion Nicoll and Illingworth Kerr.
