= STRL =

STRL may refer to:

- NHK Science & Technology Research Laboratories
- Statesboro Regional Public Libraries
