= Warren County Library =

Warren County Library may refer to:

- Warren County Library branch of the Greater Clarks Hill Regional Library System
- Warren Public Library in Warren, Ohio
