= ORLS =

ORLS may refer to:

- Ocmulgee Regional Library System
- Oconee Regional Library System
- Our Redeemer Lutheran School in Madison, Wisconsin
