= Bartram Trail Regional Library System =

Coordinates: 33.735493°N 82.738050°W

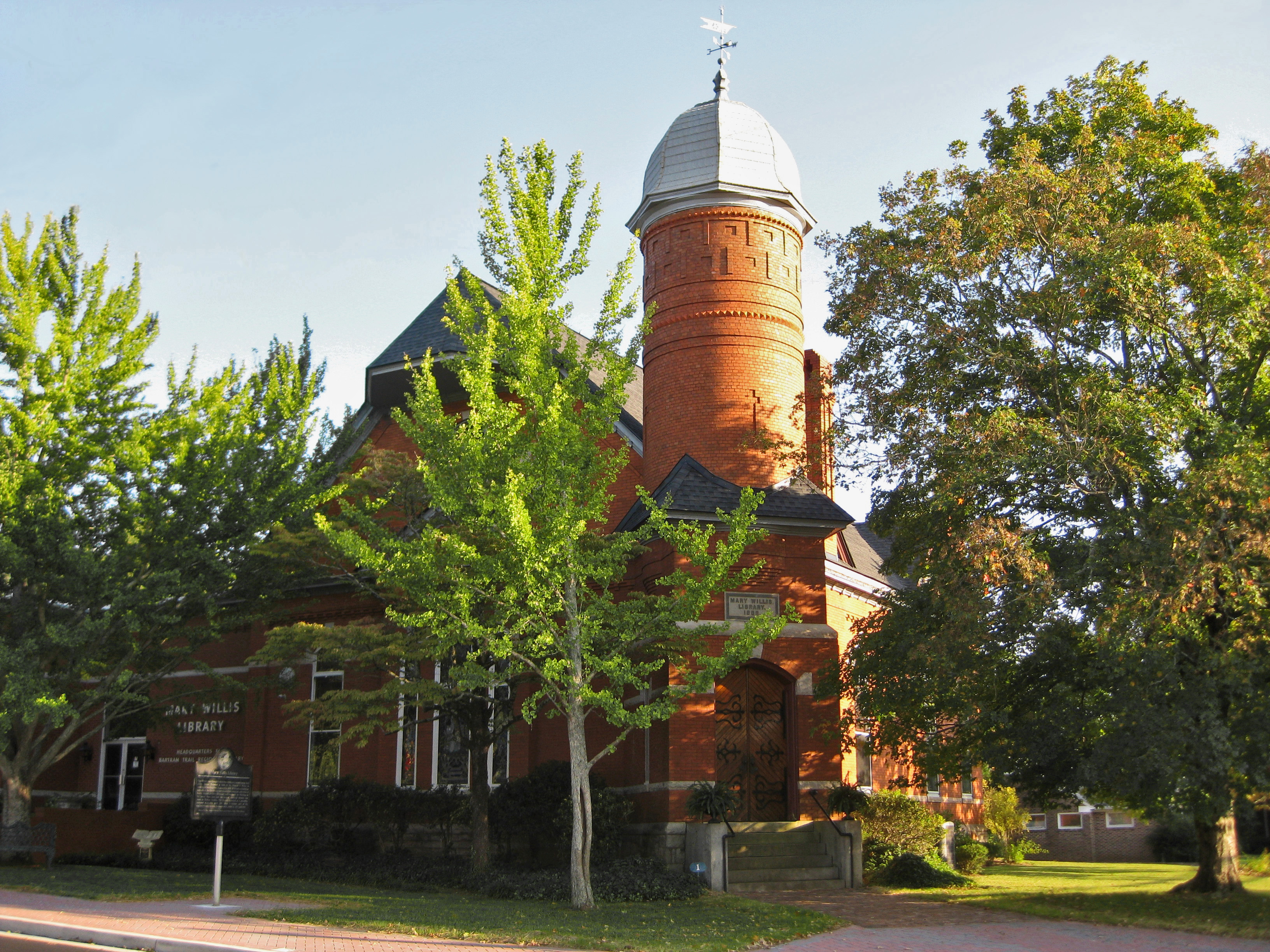
- The Mary Willis Library
- Location: Wilkes, McDuffie, Taliaferro counties, Georgia
- Established: 1974
- Branches: 3

Collection
- Size: 169,377 (2020)

Access and use
- Circulation: 46,651 (2020)
- Population served: 24,634 (2020)
- Members: 10,013 (2020)

Other information
- Director: Lillie Crowe
- Website: http://www.btrl.net/

The Bartram Trail Regional Library System (BTRLS) is a public library system serving the counties of Wilkes, McDuffie, and Taliaferro, Georgia, United States. The central library is the Mary Willis Library, a historic library built in 1888 out of red brick featuring Tiffany glass. This location is listed on the National Register of Historic Places.

BTRLS is a member of PINES, a program of the Georgia Public Library Service that serves 300 member libraries covering 146 counties of Georgia. Any resident in a PINES supported library system has access to the system's collection of 11 million books. The library is also serviced by GALILEO, a program of the University System of Georgia which stands for "GeorgiA LIbrary LEarning Online". This program offers residents in supported libraries access to over 100 databases indexing thousands of periodicals and scholarly journals. It also boasts over 10,000 journal titles in full text.

== Namesake ==
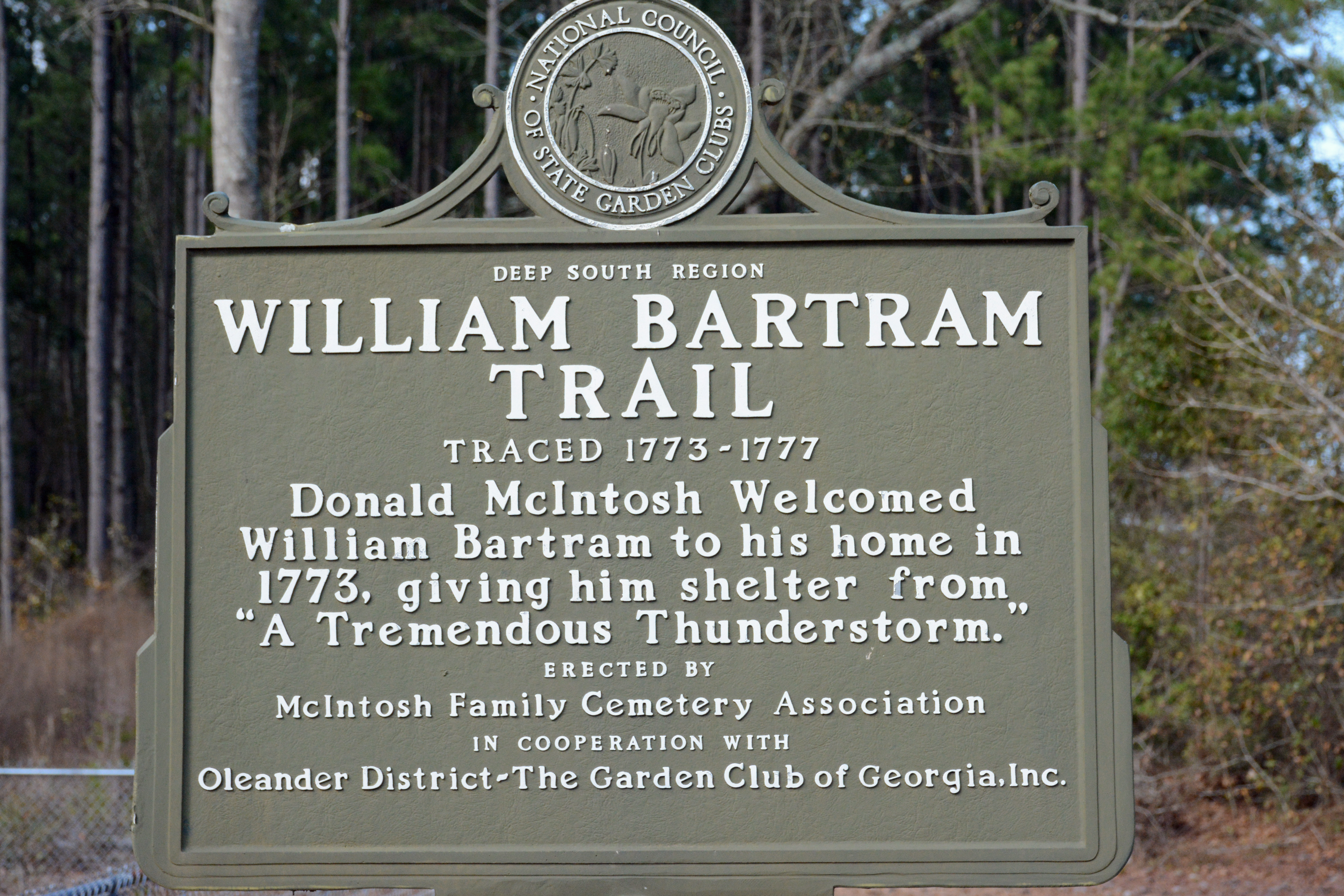
William Bartram Trail, for which the library is named

The namesake of the library system is William Bartram, a well-known American naturalist whose prominence in the area resulted from his four-year journey in the late 1700s through many of the southern colonies as he identified and discovered various flora and fauna. Also named after him, the Bartram Trail passes through the current communities that are part of the library system. While Bartram was in east Georgia he is recorded to have stayed in the present-day communities of Mary Willis, Taliaferro, and Thomson-McDuffie during his expeditions for his Elements of Botany Engravings. These communities are presently serviced by the Bartram Trail Regional Library System.

== History ==
The first libraries to lay the groundwork for what would become the Bartram Trail Regional Library System were the Mary Willis Library and the Taliaferro County Library. In 1967 these two individual libraries signed a contractual agreement to form what was known as the Wilkes-Taliaferro Regional Library System. Three years into this agreement, in 1970, Greene County joined the system and lengthened the name to the Wilkes-Taliaferro-Greene Regional System.

By 1974, with the incorporation of McDuffie County, the library system voted to shorten its name to its current form and create a Wilkes County Library Board in order to oversee the daily operations of their newly grown library system. With an increase in interest for the library, and an ever-growing need for more space, the next decade involved many improvements to the individual buildings. In 1977 the Mary Willis Library opened an annex, creating an additional 4,459 square feet of space. In 1980 the McDuffie County Library moved to the newly renovated U.S. Post Office. In 1985 the Green County Library constructed a new building with 8,600 square feet of space. In 1987 the Thomson-McDuffie County Library replaced the old county library, granting 13,500 square feet.

The last county to construct a new building was Taliaferro County, which opened its new library in 1989. Two years later another addition was made to the Mary Willis Library to add more space for book stacks and meeting rooms.

In 1992 Greene County withdrew from the Bartram Trail Regional Library System to join the Uncle Remus Regional Library System to the west.

== Branches ==
=== Mary Willis Library ===
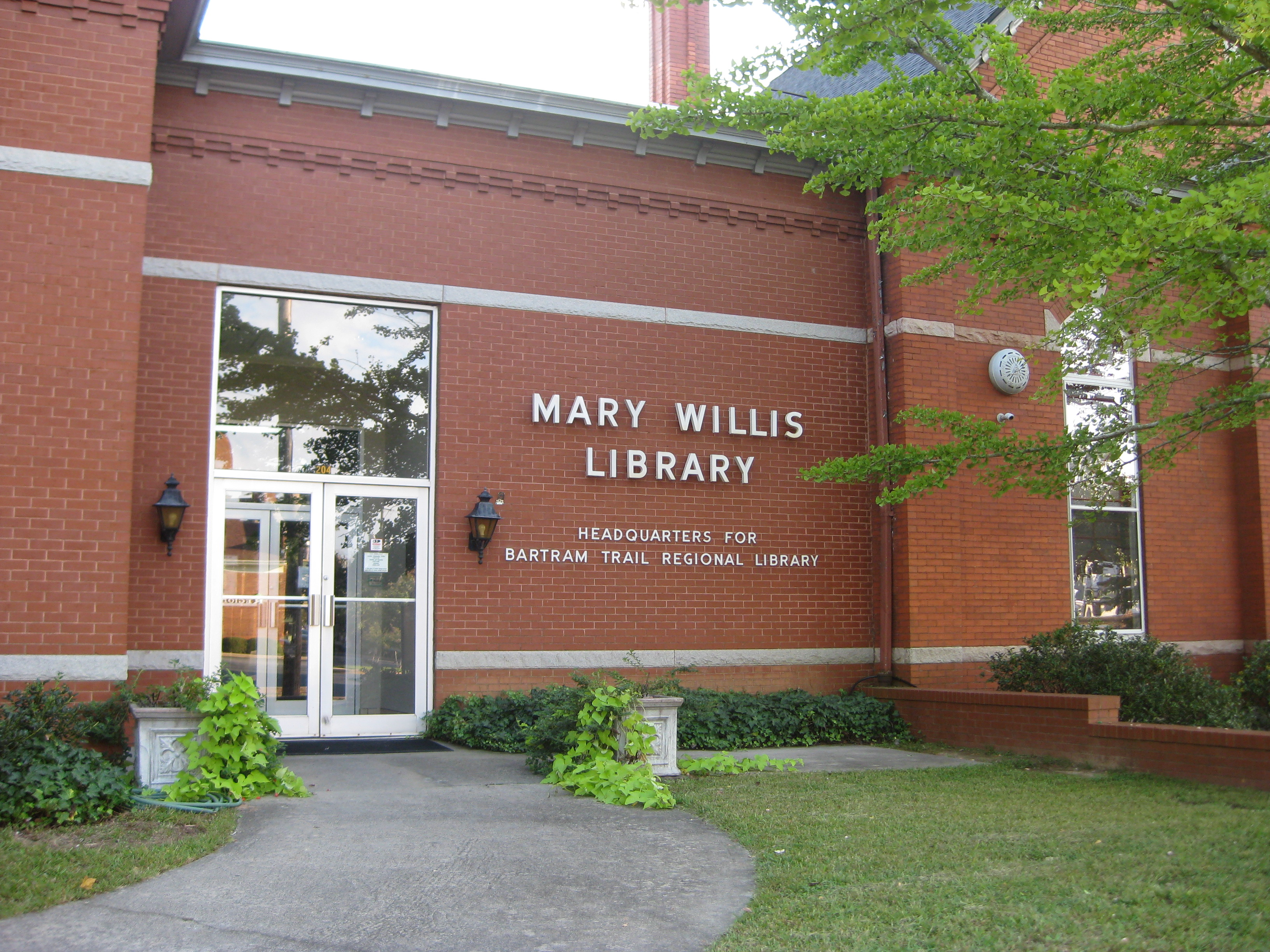
Entrance to the Mary Willis Library annex (added in 1989)

The Mary Willis Library was the first free public library in the state of Georgia when it opened in 1889. The free library was a revolutionary concept in a day when all the state's earlier libraries charged users a subscription fee. The library was founded the previous year by Dr. Francis T. Willis in memory of his daughter, Mary. Dr. Willis, a local by birth who had moved to Richmond, Virginia in 1867, left the library as a gift to his hometown and its citizens. Dr. Willis donated his own private collection of books, plus fifteen thousand dollars for the library's construction, two thousand dollars to purchase furnishings and more books, and another ten thousand dollars as an endowment fund.

In addition to its current collection of library materials, the Mary Willis Library owns a large and invaluable collection of Wilkes County and other greater Georgia history, including books published by local authors, family memorabilia, and Washington newspapers. The library was added to the National Register of Historic Places in 1972.

The Mary Willis Library serves Wilkes County in Northeast Georgia, a land area of 470 square miles and a population estimated by the office of planning and budgets to be 10,560.

=== Taliaferro County Library ===
The first building that served as the Talioferro County Library was created in 1916 by businessman John Holden "for use of the 'Ladies of Crawfordville." Upon Holden's death in 1936, the ownership of the library turned over to the town of Crawfordville and was reassigned to public use.

In 1969 the Taliaferro and Wilkes County libraries began the first iteration of a library system in the region. By 1989 the library moved from the original Holden building to a newly constructed brick building a half block away. The increase in space allowed for the creation of meeting rooms as well as the addition of computer capabilities into the present day.

The Taliaferro County Library serves a land area of 195.5 square miles and a population estimated by the office of planning and budgets to be 1,921.

=== Thomson-McDuffie County Library ===
The Thomson-McDuffie County Library was first constructed in 1937, and was originally known as the Thomson Community Library. Like the Taliferro Library, the Thomson library was kept and housed by the Woman's Club in McDuffie County.

In 1974 the Thomson Community Library joined the Bartram Trail Regional Library System. By 1980 in need of more space it moved to the old U.S. Post Office, but by 1987 required yet another building to house its growing collection. A new building was constructed at 338 Main Street in Thomson and renamed the Thomson-McDuffie County Library to acknowledge the help the City of Thomson provided for the library's operation.

The Thomson-McDuffie County Library serves McDuffie County in Northeast Georgia, a land area of 256 square miles and a population estimated by the office of planning and budgets to be 22,209.

== Library systems in neighboring counties ==
- Athens Regional Library System to the northwest
- Elbert County Public Library to the north
- Greater Clarks Hill Regional Library System to the east and west
- Augusta-Richmond County Public Library System to the southeast
- Jefferson County Library System to the south
- Azalea Regional Library System to the west
