= Conyers-Rockdale Library System =

Public library in Georgia, US

Coordinates: 33.664869°N 84.018142°W

- Location: Conyers, Georgia
- Established: 1919
- Branches: 1

Collection
- Size: 107,469 (2016)

Access and use
- Circulation: 243,025 (2016)
- Population served: 90,489 (2016)
- Members: 43,234 (2016)

Other information
- Director: Brenda Poku
- Website: http://conyersrockdalelibrary.org

The Conyers-Rockdale Library System (CRLS) is a public library located in Rockdale County, Georgia. It is home to one branch on Green Street, Conyers, Georgia, the Nancy Guinn Memorial Library.

Conyers-Rockdale Library System is a member of PINES, a program of the Georgia Public Library Service that covers 53 library systems in 143 counties of Georgia. Any resident in a PINES supported library system has access to over 10.6 million books in the system's circulation. The library is also serviced by GALILEO, a program of the University System of Georgia which stands for "GeorgiA LIbrary LEarning Online." This program offers residents in supported libraries access to over 100 databases indexing thousands of periodicals and scholarly journals. It also boasts over 10,000 journal titles in full text.

== History ==
=== Library History ===
The first iteration of a library in Rockdale County was established by the Conyers Civic League out of the Conyers Public School in 1919. The school, recently rebuilt in 1915 due to a fire, required a library to meet new Georgia accreditation.

The library officially changed its name to Nancy Guinn Memorial Library in 1921. Nancy Guinn was the founder and president of the Conyers Civic League which worked to construct the library originally, and helped establish a committee to bring in more volumes to the growing library.

In 1953 the library became part of the DeKalb Regional Library System, a three-county regional library system including Newton, DeKalb and Rockdale counties. These libraries worked in relation with each other until 1989 when all three libraries decided to disband and form their own library systems in their respective counties.

=== The Blade Sculpture ===
The current logo of the library features a 25-foot abstract painted steel and fiberglass sculpture known as "The Blade". The Blade is located on the library property and was commissioned in 1971 from a then up-and-coming sculptor named James Clover. It was built as a symbol "In honor of all members of the Conyers Civic League, past, present and future."

The Blade is included in the database of the Inventories of American Painting and Sculpture of the Smithsonian American Art Museum.

== Library systems in neighboring counties ==
- Gwinnett County Public Library to the north.
- Azalea Regional Library System to the north east.
- Newton County Library System to the south east.
- Henry County Library System to the south west.
- DeKalb County Public Library to the north west.
