= Flint River Regional Library System =

Public library system in Georgia, USA

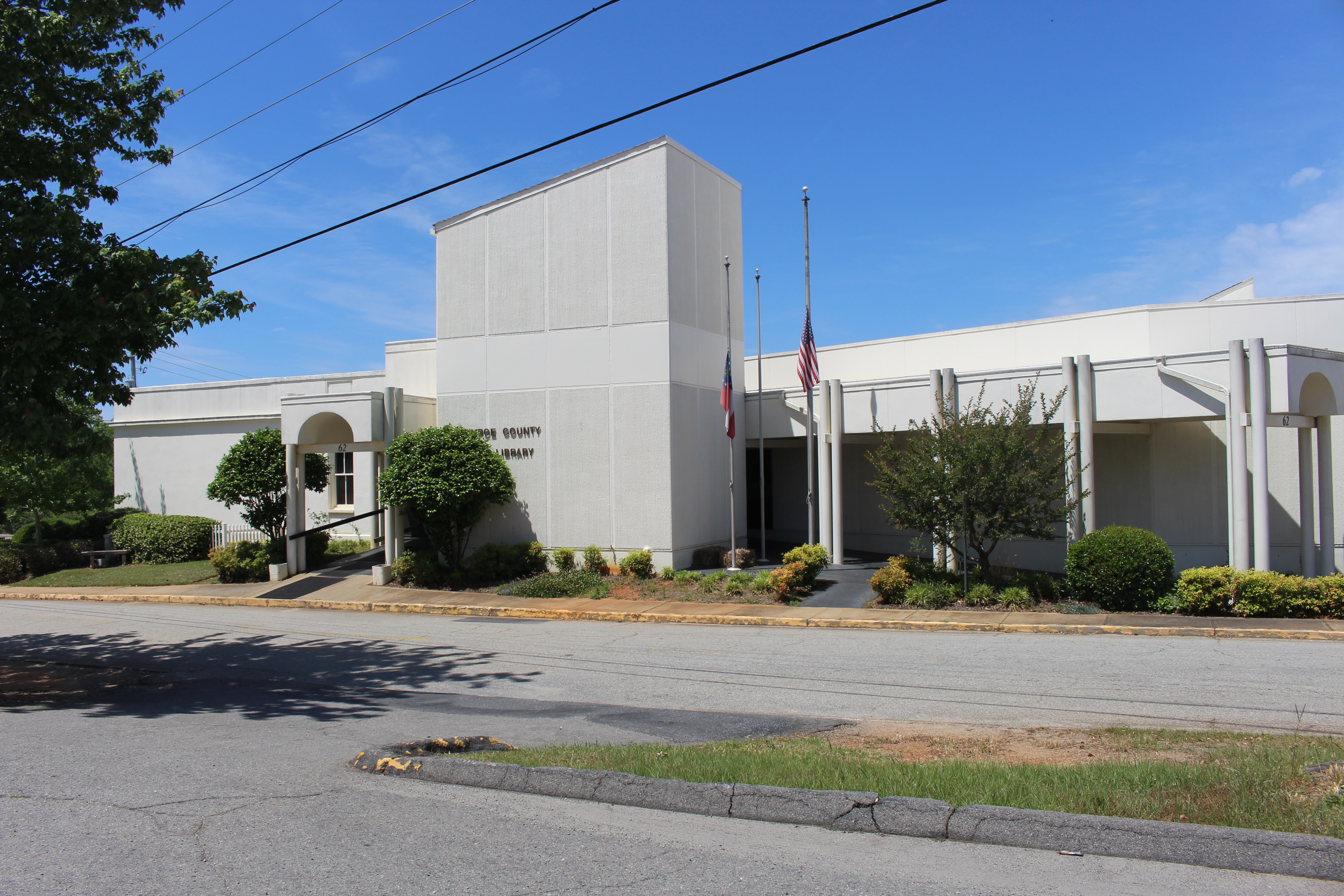
- Monroe County Public Library
- Location: West-Central Georgia
- Established: 1949
- Branches: 9

Collection
- Size: 531,993

Access and use
- Circulation: 1,071,130 (2015)
- Population served: 272,943 (2017)
- Members: 138,969 (2015)

Other information
- Director: Natalie Marshall
- Website: http://frrls.net/

The Flint River Regional Library System (FRRLS) is a collection of nine public libraries in the Atlanta metropolitan area of Georgia. The library serves the residents of the following six counties: Butts, Fayette, Lamar, Monroe, Pike, and Spalding.

All of the locations in the FRRLS are part of PINES, a statewide consortium of libraries consisting of over 8 million materials and 275 libraries available for free to Georgia residents. The system is also a member of GALILEO (GeorgiA LIbrary LEarning Online) which offers more than 100 databases and 10,000 journals for research purposes.

== Branches ==
Name	Address
Barnesville-Lamar County Library	401 Thomaston Street, Barnesville, GA 30204
Fayette County Public Library	1821 Heritage Park Way, Fayetteville, Georgia 30214
Griffin-Spalding County Library	800 Memorial Drive, Griffin, GA 30223
J. Joel Edwards Public Library	7077 Highway 19 South, PO Box 574, Zebulon, GA 30295
Jackson-Butts County Public Library	436 E College Street, Jackson, GA 30233
Milner Community Library	159 Main Street, Milner, GA 30257
Monroe County Library	62 W Main Street, Forsyth, GA 31029
Peachtree City Library	201 Willowbend Road, Peachtree City, GA 30269
Tyrone Public Library	143 Commerce Drive, Tyrone, GA 30290

== Library systems in adjacent counties ==
- Henry County Library System to the north
- Fulton County Library System to the northwest
- Clayton County Library System to the northwest
- Coweta Public Library System to the west
- Newton County Library System to the north
