= Three Rivers Regional Library System =

Public library system in Georgia, U.S.

- Location: Southeast Georgia
- Established: 2000
- Branches: 9

Collection
- Size: 261,404 (2020)

Access and use
- Circulation: 187,723 (2020)
- Population served: 166,443 (2020)
- Members: 86,004 (2020)

Other information
- Director: Patricia Herndon (Interim)
- Website: https://trrl.org/

The Three Rivers Regional Library System (TRRLS) is a public library system that serves the counties of Brantley, Camden, Charlton, Long, McIntosh, Pierce and Wayne, Georgia, United States. The administrative office of the system is located in Jesup.

The library system is named after the three rivers that course through Southeast Georgia: the St. Marys River, the Altamaha River, and the Satilla River.

TRRLS is a member of PINES, a program of the Georgia Public Library Service that covers 51 library systems in 146 counties of Georgia. Any Georgia resident or property owner, any student at a Georgia college or university, any member of the military stationed in Georgia, and anyone who works in Georgia can get a free library card at any PINES library. Patrons who do not qualify for a free card may choose to pay an annual fee of $25.00 or a semi-annual fee of $12.50 and enjoy all the benefits of a free card. Patrons may use their PINES card at any PINES library to checkout, renew, or return items. Patrons may request items from any PINES library to be sent to their home library at no cost

GPLS also provides access to GALILEO, a program of the University System of Georgia which stands for "GeorgiA LIbrary LEarning Online". This program offers residents in supported libraries access to over 100 databases indexing thousands of periodicals and scholarly journals. It also boasts over 10,000 journal titles in full text. Library patrons may access all databases inside the library and may use their PINES library card to access most databases from home.

== History ==
=== Regional History ===
The region began as the Brunswick Regional Library in 1949, with the Brunswick and Camden County libraries as members. The first regional meeting was held in Woodbine that year. The system was later renamed as the Brunswick-Glynn County Regional Library System in the 1960s. The Regional Office was originally located in Brunswick, Georgia.

Also in the 1960s, the Camden County Library moved from Woodbine to St Marys. In 1977, a second Camden County library opened in Kingsland. In 1978, the two libraries in Kingsland and St Marys were officially designated as Camden County Public Library and St Marys Public Library.

The regional library system was renamed as the Three Rivers Regional Library System in 2000, a nod to the three rivers—the Altamaha, the Satilla, and the St. Marys—that tie the region together.

Several existing or new libraries joined the region over the years: Charlton County (1952), Brantley County (1954), Wayne County (1955), McIntosh County (Ida Hilton Public Library) (1961), Long County (1961), St. Simons Island (2007), Sapelo Island (Hog Hammock Public Library) (2008), Woodbine (2020), and Pierce County (2024). In 2012, the libraries in Brunswick and St. Simons Island left the Three Rivers Regional Library System to form the Marshes of Glynn Libraries. The Regional Office moved to Jesup after the departure of the libraries in Glynn County.

=== Wayne County Library ===
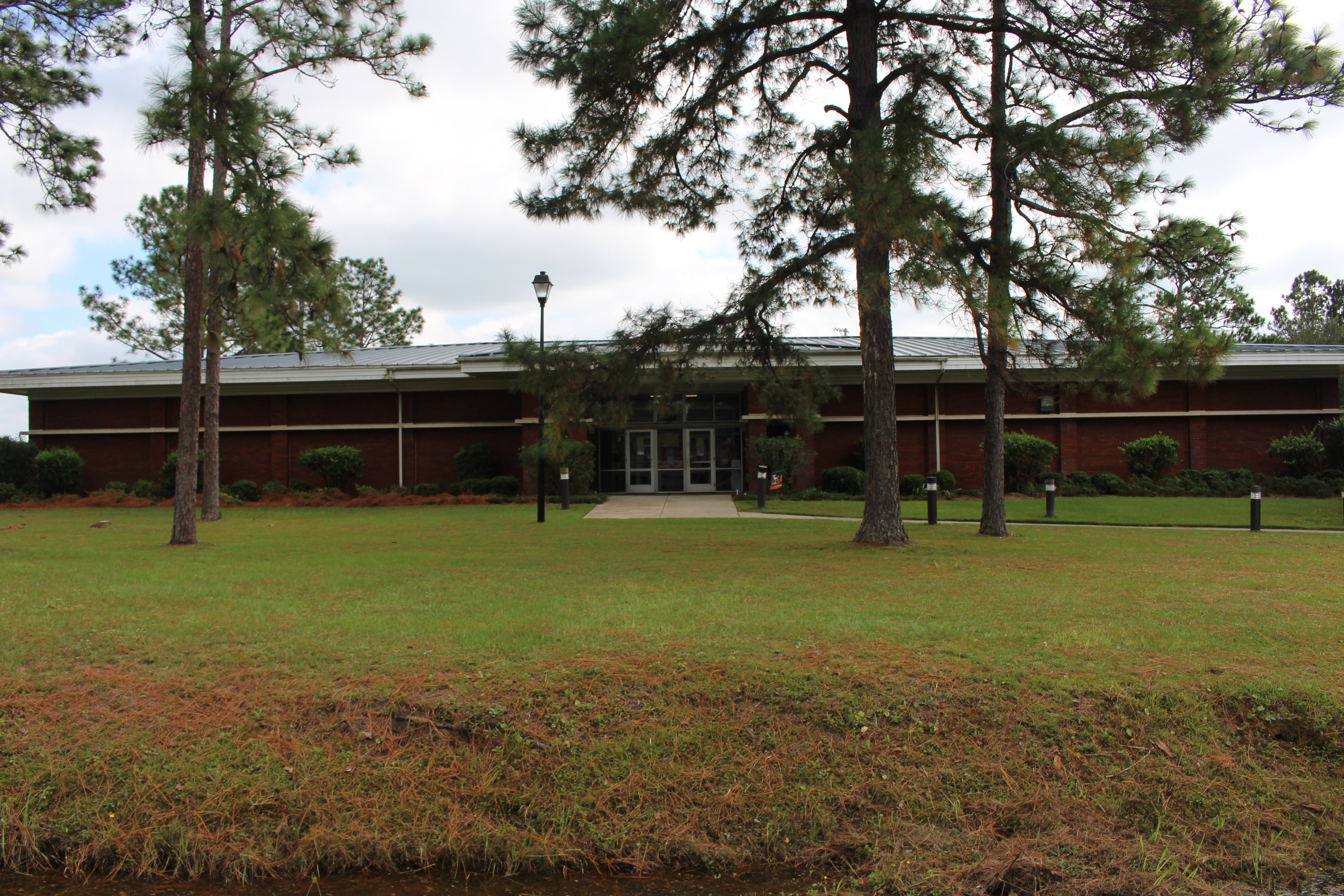
The Wayne County Library

Built in 1937 through efforts by the Works Progress Administration, the Wayne County Library started off with a small, inadequate building. By the end of 1938 many of the books in the collection were already in bad repair, and public funding of the library was minimal. Constant financial support was afforded to the library by the Georgia Library Commission for its first decade in order to stay afloat.

Towards the beginning of 1950 the Tecoma Garden Club helped to alleviate some of the library's financial issues. The club first secured permission and petitioned interested parties for monies to construct a library space in the local Community House. The initial goal of $2,000 was met and exceeded, and in the end the Garden Club has raised $6,000 to be used for the project. In order to incorporate the ideologies of the Garden Club with the wishes of the Public Library blueprints called for a library which included large windows and French doors looking out onto a grassed terrace, nestled in a grove of pine trees. Due to problems in construction the entire $6,000 fund was spent before the building saw completion. The City of Jesup provided $200 for plumbing and heating, and the rest of the $2,000 deficit was raised through more efforts by the Garden Club. The library officially opened on November 9, 1949, and is the building which is still in use today.

The library holds a WPA mural titled "General Oglethorpe Concludes a Treaty of Amity and Peace with the Creek Indians – May 18, 1733", painted in Jesup's United States post office in 1938 by artist David Hutchison.

== Branches ==
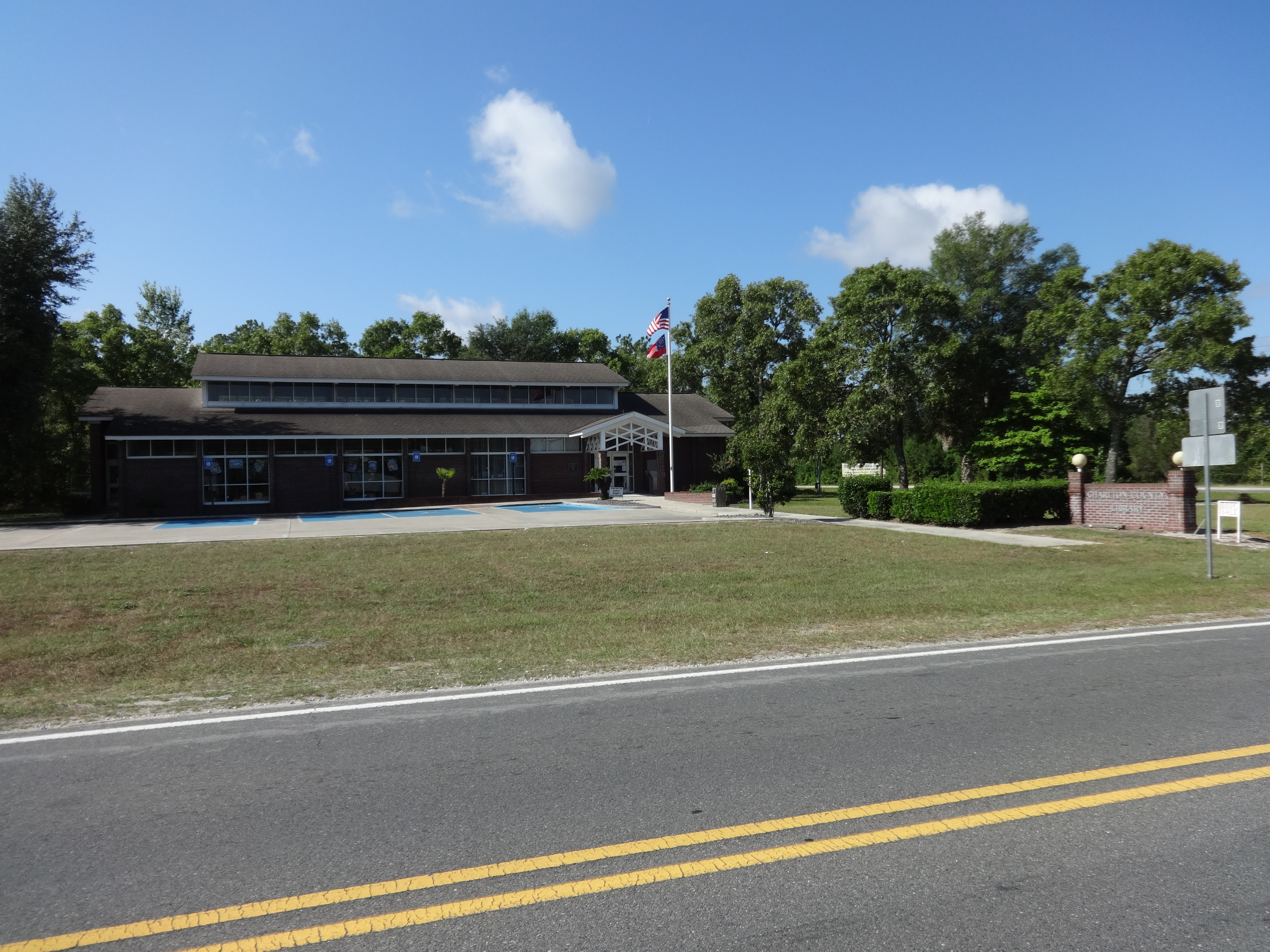
Charlton County Library

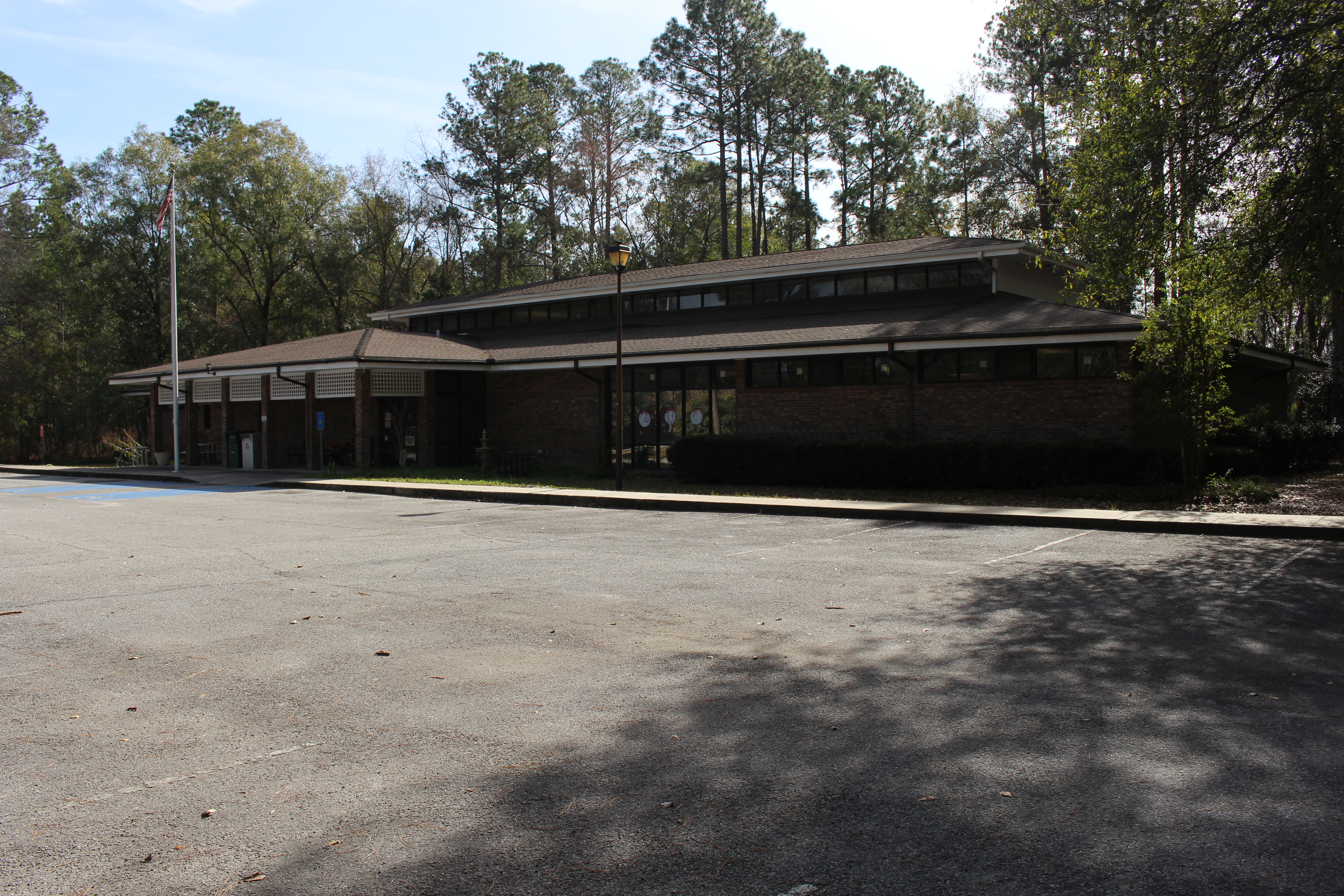
Brantley County Library

Name	Joined	Address
Brantley County Library	1954	14046 Cleveland Street, East; mailing address: P.O. Box 1090, Nahunta, GA 31553
Camden County Public Library *	1949	1410 Highway 40 East, Kingsland, GA 31548
Charlton Public Library	1952	1291 Indian Trail, Folkston, GA 31537
Hog Hammock Public Library	2008	1023 Hillery Lane, P.O. Box 69, Sapelo Island, GA 31327
Ida Hilton Public Library	1961	1105 North Way, Darien, GA 31305
Long County Public Library	1961	28 South Main Street, Ludowici, GA 31316
Pierce County Public Library	2024	785 College Ave, Blackshear, GA 31516
St Marys Public Library *	1949	100 Herb Bauer Drive, St. Marys, GA 31558
Wayne County Library	1955	759 Sunset Boulevard, Jesup, GA 31545
Woodbine Public Library	2000	103 East 8th Street, Woodbine, GA 31569

NOTE: * Originally, the Camden County and St Marys libraries were a single library.

== Library systems in neighboring counties ==
- Ohoopee Regional Library System to the north
- Live Oak Public Libraries to the northeast
- Marshes of Glynn Libraries to the east
- Okefenokee Regional Library System to the west
