= Jefferson County Library System =

- Location: Jefferson County, Georgia
- Branches: 3

Collection
- Size: 66,543 (2016)

Access and use
- Circulation: 60,604 (2016)
- Population served: 16,268 (2016)
- Members: 10,942 (2016)

Other information
- Director: Christina Shepherd
- Website: http://jefferson.public.lib.ga.us/

The Jefferson County Library System (JCLS) is a public library system in Jefferson County, Georgia, United States. The system consists of three libraries, with headquarters in Louisville.

JCLS is a member of PINES, a program of the Georgia Public Library Service that covers 53 library systems in 143 counties of Georgia. Any resident in a PINES supported library system has access to the system's collection of 10.6 million books. The library is also serviced by GALILEO, a program of the University System of Georgia which stands for "GeorgiA LIbrary LEarning Online". This program offers residents in supported libraries access to over 100 databases indexing thousands of periodicals and scholarly journals. It also boasts over 10,000 journal titles in full text.

== History ==
The men of Louisville formed the first county library association in 1867, with its first meeting held on April 2 of that year. Not much is known of the collection size of the library during the 19th century, but soon after the turn of the century, in 1907, the library passed control over to the United Daughters of the Confederacy. The Daughters maintained the library and brought the collection up to 80 volumes before donating the collection to the Louisville Academy Library in 1921.

With the acquisition of the library by the Louisville Academy Library board, the service to the library became subscription based. An initiation fee of $5 was charged to new patrons of the library with monthly dues of fifty cents. Citizens could instead donate five books of similar value to avoid the registration dues.

This early founding lay the groundwork for the Jefferson County Library, which was dedicated on August 16, 1970, as a free public library to the county. The name has since changed to the Louisville Public Library with the addition of the McCollum and Wadley branches to create the regional system.

== Branches ==
Name	Address
Louisville Public Library	306 East Broad Street, Louisville, GA 30434
McCollum Public Library	405 North Main Street, Wrens, GA 30833
Wadley Public Library	11 West College Street, Wadley, GA 30477

== Library systems in neighboring counties ==
- Bartram Trail Regional Library System to the north
- Greater Clarks Hill Regional Library System to the northeast
- Augusta-Richmond County Public Library System to the northeast
- Statesboro Regional Public Libraries to the south
- Oconee Regional Library System to the west
