= Ohoopee Regional Library System =

- Location: Toombs, Jeff Davis, Montgomery, and Tattnall Counties, Georgia
- Branches: 7

Collection
- Size: 202,963 (2016)

Access and use
- Circulation: 93,828 (2016)
- Population served: 78,353 (2016)
- Members: 16,479 (2016)

Other information
- Director: Cameron Asbell
- Website: http://ohoopeelibrary.org/

The Ohoopee Regional Library System is a public library system serving the counties of Jeff Davis, Montgomery, Tattnall, and Toombs, Georgia. The logo of the system features a vidalia onion, as the region is home to Vidalia, Georgia where the onions are grown.

Ohoopee Regional Library System is a member of PINES, a program of the Georgia Public Library Service that covers 53 library systems in 143 counties of Georgia. Any resident in a PINES supported library system has access to the system's collection of 10.6 million books. The library is also serviced by GALILEO, a program of the University System of Georgia which stands for "GeorgiA LIbrary LEarning Online". This program offers residents in supported libraries access to over 100 databases indexing thousands of periodicals and scholarly journals. It also boasts over 10,000 journal titles in full text.

== Branches ==
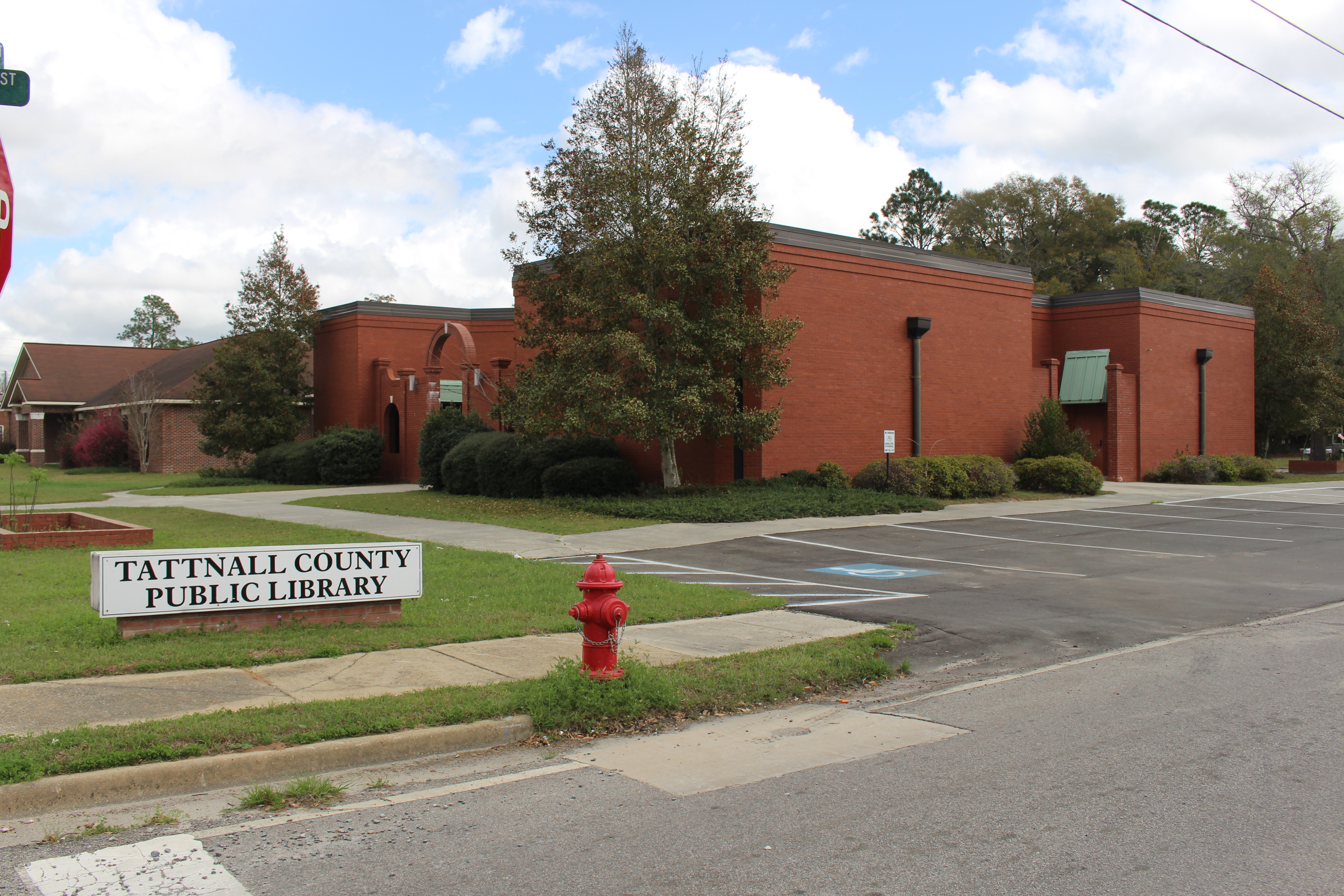
The Tattnall County Public Library

Name	Address
Glennville Public Library	408 East Barnard Street, Glennville, GA 30427
Jeff Davis County Public Library	189 E. Jarman Street, Hazlehurst, GA 31539
Ladson Genealogical Library	610 Jackson Street, Vidalia, GA 30474
Montgomery County Public Library	215 Railroad Avenue, Mount Vernon, GA 30445
Nelle Brown Memorial Library	166 West Liberty Street, Lyons, GA 30436
Tattnall County Public Library	129 Tattnall Street, Reidsville, GA 30453
Vidalia-Toombs County Public Library	610 Jackson Street, Vidalia, GA 30474

== Library systems in neighboring counties ==
- Oconee Regional Library System to the north west.
- Statesboro Regional Public Libraries to the north.
- Live Oak Public Libraries to the east.
- Three Rivers Regional Library System to the east.
- Okefenokee Regional Library System to the south.
- Satilla Regional Library System to the south west.
- Ocmulgee Regional Library System to the west.
