= Clayton County Library System =

Public library system in Georgia, U.S.

- Location: Clayton County, Georgia
- Established: 1981
- Branches: 6

Collection
- Size: 501,321

Access and use
- Circulation: 456,081 (2015)
- Population served: 269,649 (2015)
- Members: 176,304 (2015)

Other information
- Director: Scott Parham
- Website: http://claytonpl.org

The Clayton County Library System (CCLS) is a public library system consisting of six branches in the north central portion of Georgia, south of Atlanta. Its six branches serve 65% of the county population, making it one of the highest attended library systems in Georgia per capita.

CCLS participates in PINES, a public library network of 281 libraries in 140 counties throughout Georgia. Any resident of Georgia may receive a PINES library card which allows them access to any of the 8 million books in its collection across the state. The library is also a member of GALILEO, Georgia's "virtual library" which facilitates online access to over 100 databases (including magazine articles and online books) for researchers and students on a wide variety of topics.

== History ==
=== Flint River Regional Library System ===
An idea for a library in Jonesboro was started in 1941 by the Jonesboro Women's Club. The collection at this time was only 200 books which were housed in the Jones Brothers Department Store on South Main Street.

In 1960 this small location had grown and joined the Flint River Regional Library System in Griffin. By joining this consortium the members of Jonesboro were able to have access to a much larger selection of books and services. By 1964 the town of Jonesboro was willing to build their own official library to support the library system, and in 1966 opened the Jonesboro Branch.

Over the next two years the towns of Forest Park and Riverdale opened their own locations, in 1967 and 1968 respectively. By 1975 the Morrow Branch opened in Morrow.

=== Clayton County Library founding ===
With four regularly visited branches already established in Clayton, the county opted to form its own independent library system in 1981. By 1988 they constructed the Headquarters Library, the largest library in the system, and the location of the library administration.

In 1991 the Morrow Branch moved to Maddox Road, and the new construction received critical acclaim in modern architecture by Architecture and Urbanism magazine. In 1998 a new Riverdale Branch was constructed on Valley Hill Road. The Lovejoy Branch was constructed in 2005 along McDonough Road.

The most recent addition, a new location for the Forest Park Branch, was completed in 2012. In 2015 the library received a grant from the American Library Association and Financial Industry Regulatory Authority enabling librarians to partner with key organizations in the community to teach financial literacy, home ownership, budgeting, money management, and business ownership.

== Locations ==
Name	Address	Website
Forest Park Branch	4812 West Street, Forest Park, GA 30297	http://claytonpl.org/forest-park/
Headquarters Library	865 Battle Creek Road, Jonesboro, Georgia 30236	http://claytonpl.org/headquarters/
Jonesboro Branch	124 Smith Street, Jonesboro, GA 30236	http://claytonpl.org/jonesboro/
Lovejoy Branch	1721 McDonough Road, Hampton, GA 30228	http://claytonpl.org/lovejoy/
Morrow Branch	6225 Maddox Road, Morrow, GA 30260	http://claytonpl.org/morrow/
Riverdale Branch	420 Valley Hill Road SW, Riverdale, GA 30274	http://claytonpl.org/riverdale/

== Library systems in neighboring counties ==
- Fulton County Library System to the northwest
- DeKalb County Public Library to the northeast
- Flint River Regional Library System to the southwest
- Henry County Library System to the southeast
