= Live Oak Public Libraries =

Public library system in Chatham, Effingham, and Liberty Counties, Georgia

Coordinates: 32.057694°N 81.099440°W

Live Oak Public Library

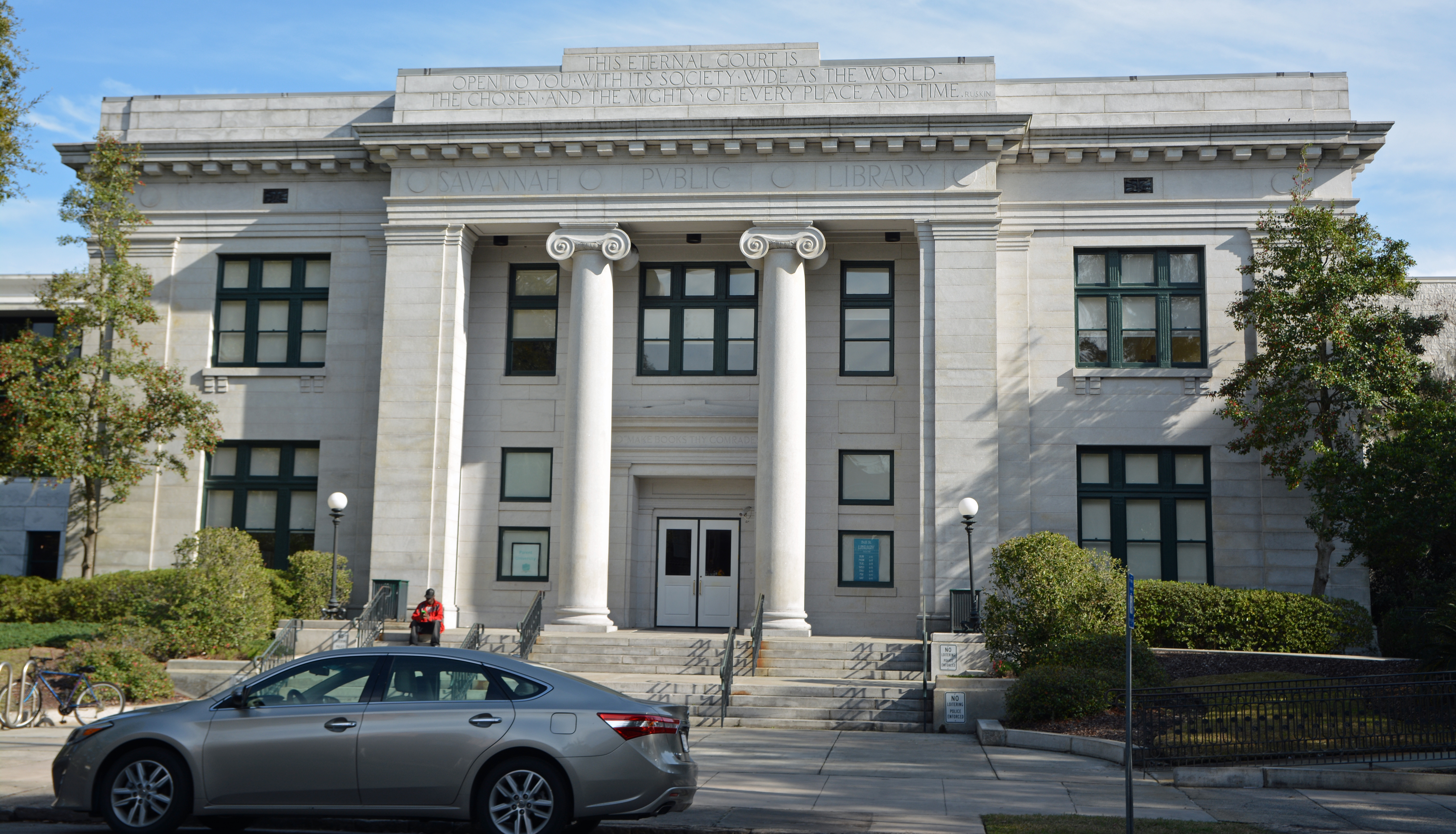
- The Bull Street Library
- Location: Savannah Metro area, Georgia
- Established: 2002
- Branches: 16

Collection
- Size: 591,184 (2016)

Access and use
- Circulation: 2,457,871 (2016)
- Population served: 413,636 (2016)
- Members: 69,959 (2016)

Other information
- Director: Lola DeWitt
- Employees: 135
- Website: http://www.liveoakpl.org/

The Live Oak Public Library is a consortium of sixteen public libraries in the Savannah metropolitan area and Hinesville – Fort Stewart metropolitan area of Georgia, United States. The library provides services for Chatham County, Effingham County, and Liberty County. The library headquarters are located in the Bull Street Library in Savannah, which is one of two Carnegie libraries in the system.

In February 2018 the library system joined PINES, a program of the Georgia Public Library Service that includes 300 member libraries covering 146 counties of Georgia. Before this change, residents serviced the library by use of a Power Card, which has since been changed to a PINES card. Any resident in a PINES supported library system has access to the system's collection of 11 million books. The library is also serviced by GALILEO, a program of the University System of Georgia which stands for "GeorgiA LIbrary LEarning Online". This program offers residents in supported libraries access to over 100 databases indexing thousands of periodicals and scholarly journals. It also boasts over 10,000 journal titles in full text.

== History ==
=== Savannah Public Library ===
The first recorded history of the Live Oak Public Libraries began in 1809 in Savannah. This first iteration was a subscription based library and is the first known library to exist in the state of Georgia. The Savannah Public Library merged with the Georgia Historical Society in 1847, transferring its entire collection to the society. By 1903 the historical society restarted the Savannah library with the original volumes, along with new materials, as the bulk of the collection. This library was the result of the cooperation between the Georgia Historical Society, who housed and maintained the 23,000 volume collection, and the City of Savannah. Service for the public began in June 1903 on a limited basis until the library fully opened on November 1.

When the library opened in 1903 it was allowed a three-year trial to see whether or not the public would generate enough interest to warrant more funding for its maintenance. For the first three years the city was providing $3,000 to the library annually, with the Georgia Historical Society providing $500 annually. Public attitude towards the system was encouraging, and by 1906 the city took on a bigger role in providing support for the library.

By 1909 the Georgia Historical Society found itself unable to provide support to the library and gave full control to the city. Looking to expand into their own space, and return the library building back to the historical society, the City of Savannah petitioned industrialist Andrew Carnegie for funding to construct a new building. In 1913 the Colored Library Association of Savannah similarly petitioned the Carnegie Corporation for funding to construct a new blacks-only library.

=== Carnegie era ===
==== Carnegie Colored Library ====
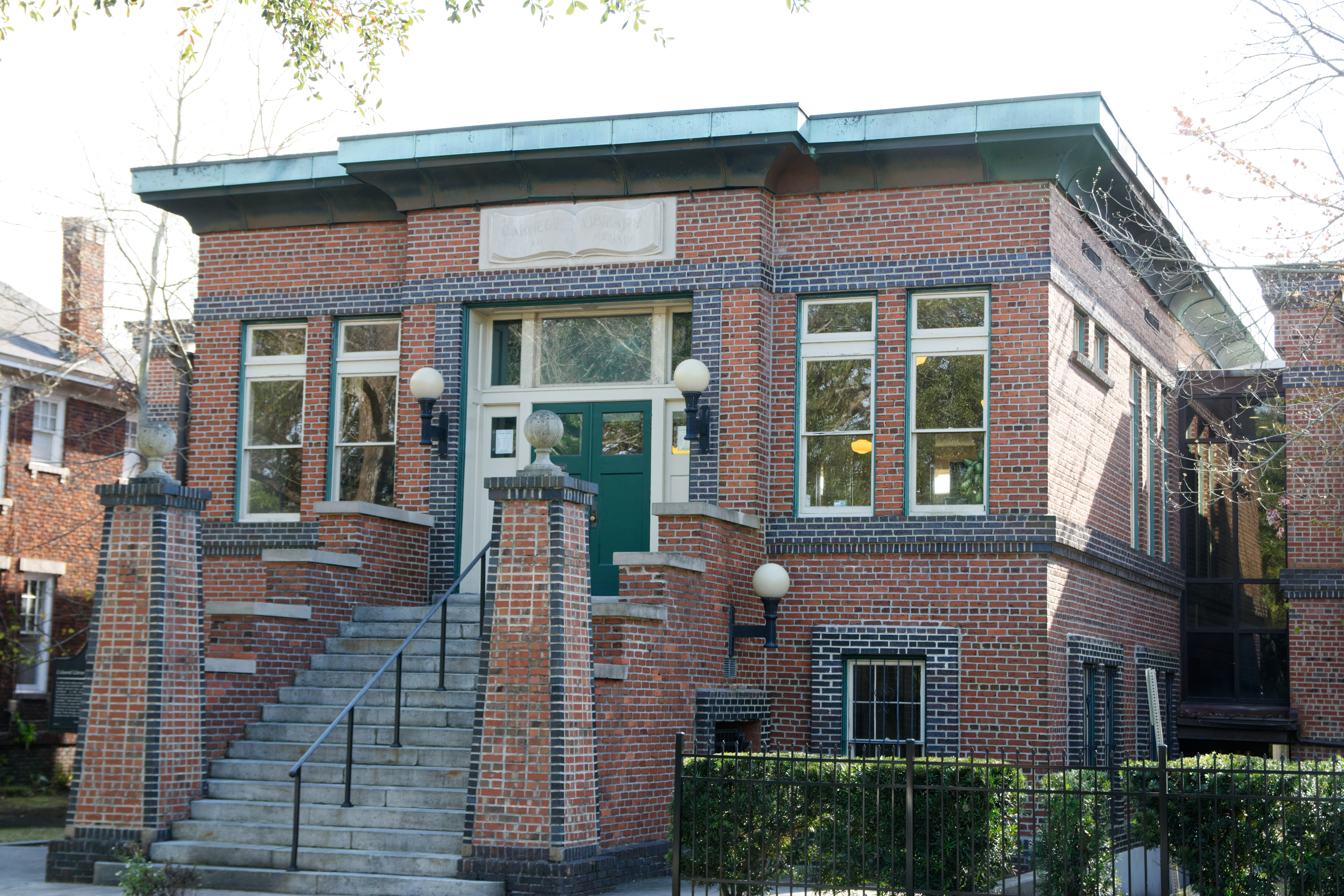
The Carnegie Library of Savannah, known previously as the Carnegie Colored Public Library

On November 1, 1903, without Carnegie funding, the city of Savannah and the Georgia Historical Society partnered to open a public library beginning on a three-year basis which was located in Hodgson Hall on the north side of Forsyth park in Savannah. The opening of this library, which excluded the black Savannah community, provided the foundation for the African‐American community to discuss and work toward getting a public library of their own. The debate over this African-American public library lasted over two years and culminated in a meeting on February 26, 1906 that established the Colored Library Association of Savannah. The association relied on contributions of books from their founding members, and money from local supporters to open their own library to the public. A precursor to the Carnegie library, the Library for Colored Citizens was located initially in a rented space on Hartridge and Price in downtown Savannah. To gain access to local news subscriptions they rented spaces within the building to these local newspapers. In 1913 the Colored Library Association petitioned the Carnegie Company to open their own library, and were awarded $12,000 to construct their own building. The Library Board of Curators raised another $3,000 to purchase a plot of land on E. Henry Street on which the library would be built.

Julian deBruyn Kops, a local Savannah architect and engineer, was commissioned to design the new library. The building itself is significant not only because of the part it plays in the social history of black Savannah, but also because of the style of which deBruyn Kops chose for it. It is one of the only examples of Prairie Style architecture within the city. A writing done on the library by the Live Oak Public Library System celebrating the centennial anniversary of the building describes the influences of Prairie architecture within the building as such: "The monumental staircase leading to the main entrance on the second floor is framed by two enormous piers with sandstone orbs on small pedestals. Additionally there are four tiered brick walls with sandstone coping which flank the staircase. The corners of the piers are delineated by dark glazed bricks, a motif repeated in a horizontal band over the second floor windows and projecting brick cornice that visually divides the first and second stories. This emphasis on horizontality achieved through the coping and polychromed brickwork is a key element of the architecture of the Prairie School, pioneered by Frank Lloyd Wright and his contemporaries. The interior continues to show the influence of Wright in the geometric and floral motifs incorporated on columns and pilasters." The flat roof and second floor staircase, as well as the ornamentals on the outside and the inside lend themselves to the Prairie School. And on the whole, the entire building, inside and out reflects a coordinated geometrical approach to architecture that is unlike any other in the city.

In 1915 the building was officially completed and came to be known locally as the "Carnegie Colored Public Library" because it was reserved for the African-American community, who were excluded from the other public library in town. In respect and appreciation of the assistance they received from the Carnegie Grant, the name of the library was also officially changed when it was moved into Kops' building on East Henry Street. The Carnegie Colored Library which existed after this move helped foster and support a growing black community in downtown Savannah through the two world wars and struggles for civil rights. The Carnegie Library became a refuge and educational center for local black children, some of which grew up to become local representatives. Justice Clarence Thomas wrote in his memoirs that he frequently used it as a boy, before the library system was desegregated. During a time of social, class, and racial segregation the Carnegie Colored Library helped publicize the need for education segregated areas.

The Carnegie Colored Library was in operation on its own until the end of segregation when it then joined the larger Savannah Public Library system in 1963. With the end of segregation, the Carnegie Library joined with the larger Savannah Public Library system in 1963. This meant that African‐Americans were able to access the Bull Street Library for the first time. The cultural importance of Carnegie remained, even as the educational necessity waned. At the end of the 20th century, the Carnegie Library had slipped into disrepair and closed.

In 2001 the Live Oak Public Libraries set forth a campaign to renovate and expand the historic building. It closed in 1997 due to a leaking roof, water damage, and a lack of funding. A fund-raising effort began and was able to support a $1.3 million renovation which was completed. Wings on either side of the original building were built. The library also received the latest technical equipment, such as a new classroom designed to provide interactive computer learning. Collections which were moved for safety were returned, and expanded to a collection of 3,000, with an emphasis on the Harlem Renaissance. The restructuring was done in the same architectural style as the building was initially erected in, and all additions would adhere to the library's historical roots. The addition was completed in 2003 on the 90th anniversary of its first opening. After the renovation the library received multiple awards from organizations on both the state and national levels. In 2004 the library was awarded by the Historic Savannah Foundation the Historic Preservation Award. In 2005 the building received multiple awards from the Georgia Trust for Historic Preservation; the 2005 Georgia Preservation Award, as well as the 2005 Marguerite Williams Award which recognizes one project which had the greatest impact on preservation in the state. Also in 2005 the library won the National Preservation Award from the National Trust for Historic Preservation. The centennial of the library was held in August 2014, when a historical marker was erected in front of the building denoting the history of the location and building for the Savannah community.

==== Bull Street Library ====
A second Carnegie library finished construction in 1916 with $104,000 in funding by Carnegie and $29,000 raised by the City of Savannah. This library was located on Bull Street adjacent to the small city park.

While initially spacious with room to spare, the library grew quicker than expected and was overcrowded by 1936. With help from the Works Progress Administration in 1936 a book stack wing was added to the building offering much needed additional space.

By 1956, however, overcrowding again became an issue. This time, rather than raise money for a new addition, the library was able to move certain non-public library activities to a residence directly adjacent to the library property. This move was effective in combating a lack of space for a short while, until 1963 when overcrowding again became an issue. At this point the library board raised funds for a massive renovation to the library. Over the course of the next three years the library expanded to two and a half times its original size. By 1966 the library was again fully operational.

=== Library expansion ===
Alongside the additions of two Carnegie libraries in the city, the Savannah Public Library began a bookmobile in 1940 to allow for ease of access to books to rural communities surrounding Savannah.

The first large change to the library system occurred in 1945 when the Effingham County Library joined the Savannah Public Library to form what was known as the Chatham-Effingham Regional Library (taken after the names of the two counties). Just over a decade later, in 1956, this regional system absorbed Liberty County, and the name was subsequently changed to the Chatham-Effingham-Liberty Library.

The next major change for the libraries was the introduction of the Carnegie Colored Public Library upon the ending of segregated library services in 1963. Shortly thereafter, in 1966, the Bull Street Library underwent its massive renovation more than doubling its space.

=== Live Oaks Public Libraries ===
In 1999 the Bull Street Library again underwent renovations, doubling its size one more time to 66,000 square feet. With this renovation came the remodeling of the 1966 addition to allow it to fit more with the neoclassical architectural style of the rest of the building, and the remodeling of the core structure to its original 1916 condition.

In 2002, in keeping with the personality of the region, the library system name was changed to Live Oak Public Libraries.

In an effort to provide the system with more support and a higher volume of books, the Live Oak Public Libraries opted to join PINES, Georgia's statewide library consortium. The decision was made in November 2017 and the library formally joined the system in February 2018.

Each year, the library typically hosts more than 1.1 million visitors, checks out over 1.1 million items, answers over 485,000 questions, registers more than 555,000 computer sessions, and presents programs to nearly 125,000 patrons in Chatham, Effingham, and Liberty counties.

== Branches ==
| Area | Name | Address |
|---|---|---|
| Central Savannah | Bull Street Library | 2002 Bull Street, Savannah, GA 31401 |
| Central Savannah | Carnegie Library | 537 East Henry Street, Savannah, 31401 |
| Central Savannah | W. W. Law Library | 909 East Bolton Street, Savannah, GA 31401 |
| Central Savannah | West Broad Library | 1110 May Street, Savannah, GA 31415 |
| Southside Savannah | Oglethorpe Mall Library | 7 Mall Annex, Savannah, GA 31406 |
| Southside Savannah | Southwest Chatham Library | 14097 Abercorn Street, Savannah, GA 31419 |
| Eastern Chatham County | Islands Library | 50 Johnny Mercer Blvd, Savannah, GA 31410 |
| Eastern Chatham County | Tybee Library | 405 Butler Avenue, Tybee Island, GA 31328 |
| Western Chatham County | Forest City Library | 1501 Stiles Avenue, Savannah, GA 31415 |
| Western Chatham County | Garden City Library | 104 Sunshine Avenue, Garden City, GA 31405 |
| Western Chatham County | Pooler Library | 216 South Rogers Street, Pooler, GA 31322 |
| Western Chatham County | Port City Library | 3501 Houlihan Ave, Savannah, GA 31408 |
| Effingham County | Rincon Library | 17th Street & Highway 21, Rincon, GA 31326 |
| Effingham County | Springfield Library | 810 Highway 119 South, Springfield, GA 31329 |
| Liberty County | Hinesville Library | 236 West Memorial Drive, Hinesville, 31313 |
| Liberty County | Midway-Riceboro Library | 9397 E. Oglethorpe Highway, Midway, GA 31320 |

== Library systems in neighboring counties ==
- Screven-Jenkins Regional Library System to the north
- Statesboro Regional Public Libraries, bisecting the system
- Three Rivers Regional Library System to the south
- Ohoopee Regional Library System to the west
