= Marshes of Glynn Libraries =

Public library system in Glynn County, Georgia

- Location: Glynn County, Georgia
- Established: 2013
- Branches: 2

Collection
- Size: 94,754 (2016)

Access and use
- Circulation: 209,833 (2016)
- Population served: 84,279 (2016)
- Members: 23,244 (2016)

Other information
- Director: Geri Mullis
- Website: http://moglibraries.org/

The Marshes of Glynn Libraries is a public library system consisting of two branches serving Glynn County, Georgia, United States. The headquarters of the library system is located in Brunswick.

Marshes of Glynn Libraries is a member of PINES, a program of the Georgia Public Library Service that covers 53 library systems in 143 counties of Georgia. Any resident in a PINES supported library system has access to the system's collection of 10.6 million books. The library is also serviced by GALILEO, a program of the University System of Georgia which stands for "GeorgiA LIbrary LEarning Online". This program offers residents in supported libraries access to over 100 databases indexing thousands of periodicals and scholarly journals. It also boasts over 10,000 journal titles in full text.

== Library system history ==
Although the Marshes of Glynn Libraries are a new system which opened in 2013, the history of a library in the Southeast Georgia region began in 1883 in Brunswick, the current location of the system's central library. The library moved to a couple of buildings before settling in City Hall until 1950. In 1936 the City of Brunswick passed an ordinance that recognized the library as an official city entity, allowing the creation of the Brunswick Library Board. With new appropriations the collection of the library grew to over 8,000 books, and a bookmobile was added in 1948.

Noticing the success of the Brunswick Public Library, in 1949 Camden County was the first county in the region to request acceptance to the Brunswick Library System. The next decade saw rapid growth as other neighboring counties followed suit. Charlton County joined in 1952, Brantley County joined in 1954, Wayne County joined in 1955, and McIntosh and Long counties joined in 1961. The now seven-region library system was serving the entire southeast corner of the state, and by 2000 was renamed the Three Rivers Regional Library System as a tribute to the three rivers which run through its region.

In 2012, amid disagreements, the Three Rivers system moved their central library out of Brunswick to Jesup. As a result, the Brunswick and St. Simons Island libraries left the Three Rivers system to create their own library system. In 2013 the Marshes of Glynn Libraries were officially formed.

== Branches ==
=== Brunswick-Glynn County Library ===
Located at 208 Gloucester Street in Brunswick, the Brunswick-Glynn County Library was constructed in 1883. In this year the Brunswick Library Association was formed and organized a local library consisting of 150 books for public rental. The collection was housed in a small store on Newcastle Street for eleven years before moving to another small building on Richmond Street. The library was moved once more in 1904 to the more centralized City Hall, where it would remain until 1950.

In 1950, the City Hall housing most of the library collection began to deteriorate. After failure of the walls and partial collapse of the building, a new home for the library had to be created. As a temporary solutionm the collection was moved to a former hot dog stand on Reynolds Street until 1958, when it moved to a former grocery store on Gloucester Street. Still without a dedicated library building ever constructed for the community of Brunswick, the Glynn County voters passed a bond issue that allowed funds to be allocated towards building a library along Gloucester Street. By 1975 this building was completed, and it is the current home of the bulk of the system's collection.

In 2013 the library started to show signs of disrepair, and safety became a concern for some working in the library. The system petitioned the Georgia Public Library service for funds, which was to allow renovations to begin tentatively in 2019.

=== St. Simons Island Public Library ===
The St. Simons Island Public Library is located at 530A Beachview Drive in St. Simons, and was constructed in 1937 by Abbie Fuller Graham, who owned a starting collection of 50 books. During the next five years the library was recognized by the state of Georgia as a standard library, and the Works Project Administration assisted in receiving funding and books for the growing collection. In 1949 the library decided to cease state funding and run independently.

In 2007 the library agreed to join the Three Rivers Regional Library System. By 2013 it broke away alongside the main Brunswick library to form the Marshes of Glynn Libraries.

== Library systems in neighboring counties ==
- Three Rivers Regional Library System to the west
