= DeKalb County Public Library =

Public library system in the Atlanta area of Georgia, United States

Coordinates: 33.77410°N 84.29394°W

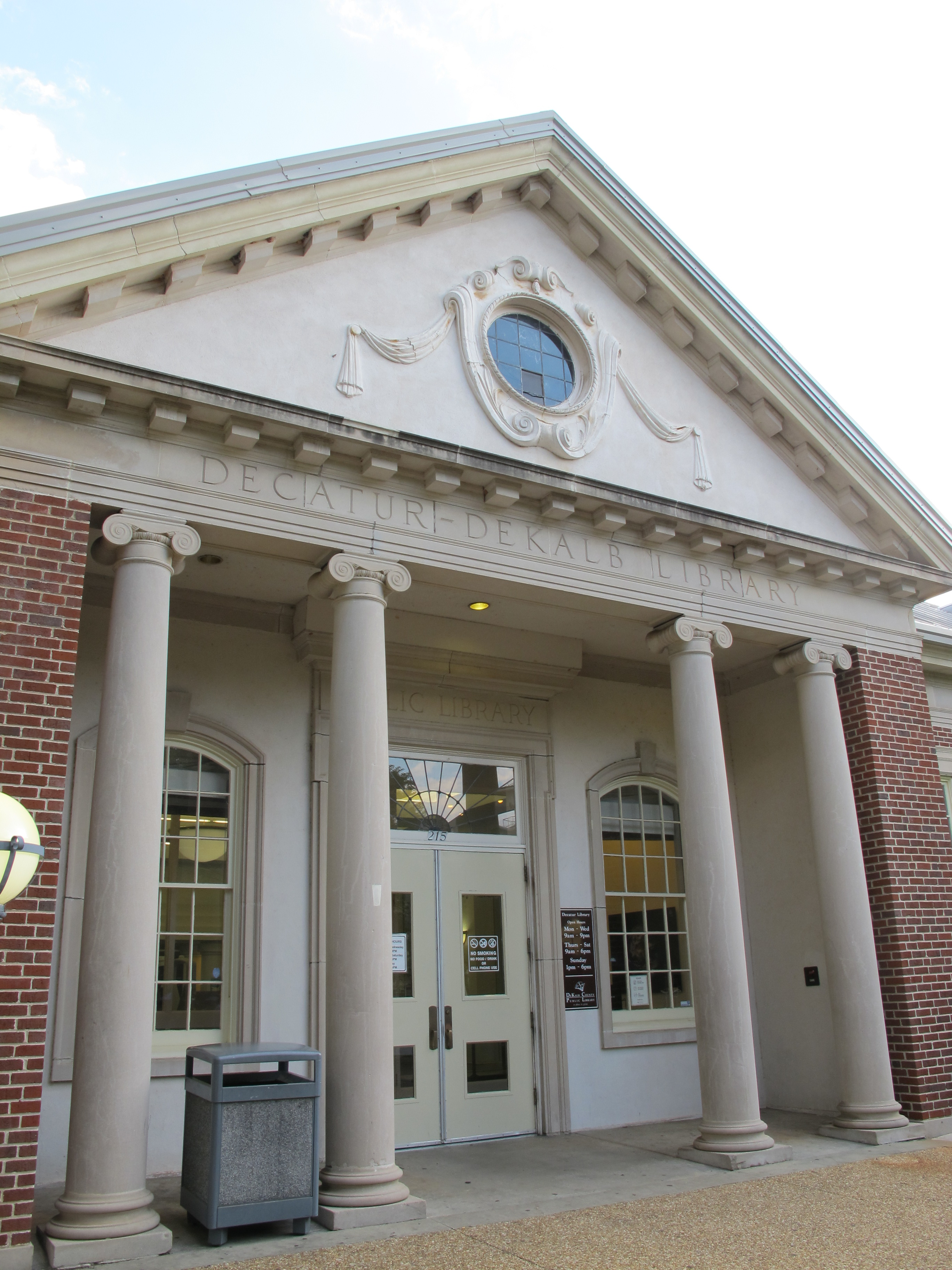
- Decatur Library - serves as central library
- Established: 1907
- Branches: 22 libraries 1 homework center

Access and use
- Circulation: 2,897,070 (2018)
- Population served: 745,417 (2018)
- Members: 195,711 (2018)

Other information
- Budget: $19.6 million (2019)
- Director: Alison Weissinger
- Employees: 239 (2019)
- Website: dekalblibrary.org

The DeKalb County Public Library (DCPL) is the public library system of DeKalb County, Georgia in the Atlanta metropolitan area. The library system headquarters are at the Darro C. Willey Administrative Offices in Decatur.

Its collection includes over 850,000 books and over 19,000 downloadable e-books; collections of over 400 magazines, academic and scientific journals, and newspapers; and audiovisual materials including videotapes, audiobooks, CDs, and DVDs. Library patrons can also access a variety of databases and online references through the GALILEO (GeorgiA LIbrary LEarning Online) system. The library currently operates 22 branches located throughout the county, with construction of two additional branches planned.

DeKalb County Public Library offers literacy services, such as Adult Basic Education (ABE) which helps adults learn basic skills in math, reading, and language development. English as a second language (ESL) classes are held at the branches and provide advanced instruction in the speaking, reading, writing, grammar, and syntax of English for speakers of other languages. The library offers online resources and learning tools including access to databases such as learningexpress. The library has test preparations resources for exams such as GED, ASVAB and many others. Literacy outreach programs include Project Horizons, Project Reap and Health Literacy.

As of 2018, the library served a population of over 745,000, of whom almost 196,000 had library cards. As of fiscal year 2019 the library system a staff of 239 employees, and a budget of over $19.5 million.

== List of branches ==
Libraries in incorporated areas

- Brookhaven: Brookhaven Library
- Chamblee: Chamblee Library
- Clarkston: Clarkston Library
- Decatur: Decatur Library (at various times called Decatur Public Library, Decatur-DeKalb Library and Maud M. Burrus Library)
- Doraville: Doraville Library
- Dunwoody: Dunwoody Library
- Lithonia: Lithonia-Davidson Library
- Stone Mountain: Stone Mountain-Sue Kellogg Library
- Tucker: Tucker-Reid H. Cofer Library

Libraries in unincorporated areas

- Covington Library
- Embry Hills Library (Embry Hills community)
- Flat Shoals Library
- Gresham Library
- Hairston Crossing Library
- Northlake-Barbara Loar Library (Northlake community)
- Redan-Trotti Library
- Salem-Panola Library
- Scott Candler Library
- Stonecrest Library
- Toco Hill-Avis G. Williams Library (Toco Hills community)
- Wesley Chapel-William C. Brown Library

Planned new branches

- Ellenwood
- Northeast Plaza

Other facilities

- Scottdale-Tobie Grant Homework Center (unincorporated area)

== History ==
The first public library in the county was opened in 1907, in Lithonia. In 1925 a larger public library was founded in Decatur, the county seat of DeKalb County. In 1952 branches of the Decatur Library were established in Brookhaven and Doraville, and the Decatur Library was renamed the Decatur-DeKalb Library. The previously independent public library in Lithonia also joined the Decatur-DeKalb system, although the Lithonia library maintained a separate library board until 1971. As the DeKalb Regional Library System, the library provided services for neighboring Rockdale County from 1951 to 1989, and also for Newton County from 1953 to 1989; in 1989 the regional library system was disbanded and each of the three counties established its own separate library system.

== Library systems in neighboring counties ==
- Fulton County Library System to the west
- Clayton County Library System to the south west
- Gwinnett County Public Library to the east
- Conyers-Rockdale Library System to the south east
- Henry County Library System to the south
