= Okefenokee Regional Library System =

Public library system in Georgia, United States

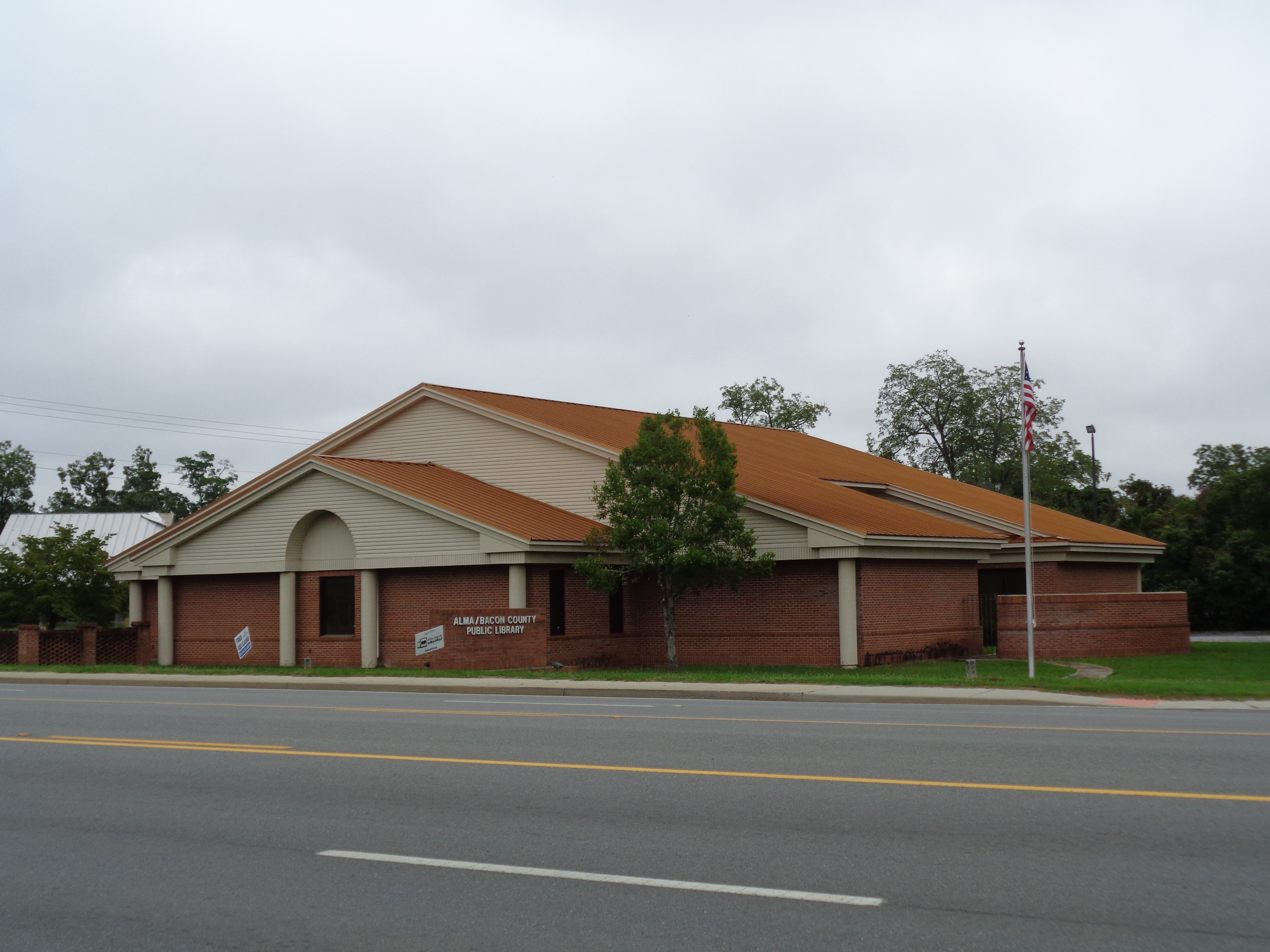
- The Alma-Bacon County Public Library
- Location: Southeast Georgia
- Established: 1950s
- Branches: 5

Collection
- Size: 131,304 (2016)

Access and use
- Circulation: 157,471 (2016)
- Population served: 92,861 (2016)
- Members: 25,067 (2016)

Other information
- Director: Erica Stembridge
- Website: https://www.okrls.org/

The Okefenokee Regional Library System (OKRLS) is a public library system serving the counties of Ware, Appling, Bacon, and Clinch, Georgia. The headquarters for the library system is the Waycross-Ware County Public Library located in Waycross, Georgia.

OKRLS is a member of PINES, a statewide resource-sharing program of the Georgia Public Library Service, which allows cardholders to borrow from member library systems across Georgia. The library is also serviced by GALILEO (Georgia Library Learning Online), a program of the University System of Georgia offering library users access to subscription databases, periodicals, and scholarly journals.

== History ==
=== Alma-Bacon County Library ===
Early years of an established public library are not known for Bacon county, yet it is known that the county school superintendent, E. C. Perkins, housed a very large collection of books. Perkins decided in the late 1930s to take the necessary steps to turn her large book collection into a public library. This first library officially opened in October 1940 and quickly moved into an abandoned building that had been built in 1930 as an overflow for the nearby hospital. With a building and collection secured the library proposed a merger with the local Historical Society to operate out of the same building. In doing so the two organizations were able to receive funds from the county budget which enabled the library to stay open for a full five-day schedule each week. As another perk of the merger the Alma-Bacon library has a vast Historical and Genealogical collection that is available to the public.

=== Appling County Public Library ===
Interest in a library in Appling County was sparked in 1928 when the Georgia Library Commission loaned 500 books to the Baxley Woman's Club who were looking to organize a public library service to the town. The library at first consisted of a single bookcase full of these books and other donated by townspeople and the women of the club, and was housed in one of the members' home. By 1936 this library had grown to the point where it moved to the back of the courthouse and a Library Board was organized to run the system. When the courthouse was due for renovations in 1953, space was again dedicated for use by the library.

In April 1961 the Appling Library became a branch of the greater Okefenokee Regional Library System. Due to increased interest in expanding the regional library more funding came in and was saved for future use to build a new dedicated library building. In 1976 the library has raised through donations and grants $140,000, and the following year this was matched by the County Commissioners. In 1977 the City Council donated a site in town for the library, and construction began. The library was dedicated to the city of Baxley in 1978.

== Branches ==
Name	Address
Alma-Bacon County Public Library	201 North Pierce Street, Alma, GA 31510
Appling County Public Library	242 E. Parker Street, Baxley, GA 31513
Clinch County Public Library	478 West Dame Street, Homerville, GA 31634
Waycross-Ware County Public Library	401 Lee Avenue, Waycross, GA 31501

== Library systems in neighboring counties ==
- Ohoopee Regional Library System to the north.
- Three Rivers Regional Library System to the east.
- South Georgia Regional Library to the south west.
- Satilla Regional Library System to the west.
