= Screven-Jenkins Regional Library System =

- Location: Screven and Jenkins Counties, Georgia
- Branches: 2

Collection
- Size: 106,519 (2016)

Access and use
- Circulation: 53,914 (2016)
- Population served: 23,584 (2016)
- Members: 8,630 (2016)

Other information
- Director: Kathryn Youles
- Website: http://www.sjrls.org/

The Screven-Jenkins Regional Library System (SJRL) is a two county public library system serving the counties of Screven and Jenkins Georgia.

SJRL is a member of PINES, a program of the Georgia Public Library Service that covers 53 library systems in 143 counties of Georgia. Any resident in a PINES supported library system has access to the system's collection of 10.6 million books. The library is also serviced by GALILEO, a program of the University System of Georgia which stands for "GeorgiA LIbrary LEarning Online". This program offers residents in supported libraries access to over 100 databases indexing thousands of periodicals and scholarly journals. It also boasts over 10,000 journal titles in full text.

== History ==
The Screven County Library was the first branch of this system to be incorporated, as part of the Works Progress Administration in June 1936. The library headquarters was originally in the county courthouse and was run by Carrie White. White, not satisfied with the small starting collection received by the WPA, donated her own collection of books to the library. Within the first year the library received other donations of books, 300 from the Sylvania school system, and 100 from the Georgia Library Commission.

As the collection grew the library realized it needed more space to store all of its books. The library moved twice before settling in the first floor of the Sylvania Masonic lodge in 1950. The following year members of both Screven and Jenkins counties came together to work out details of a library system. The Screven-Jenkins Regional Library was the result of this meeting and was officially organized in November 1951. The headquarters was agreed to be the Screven County Library, with Jenkins County Memorial being the library branch for the neighboring county. With only two libraries serving the entirety of two counties a bookmobile was added in 1952 to help rural patrons get access to the books as well.

In 1953 a member of the county, George Lorimer, donated $8,000 for the construction of a new library in Screven County on the requirement that the money be matched by the county board within 6 months. The amount was matched, and in August 1955 a bond issue passed to fund the rest of the construction fees for a new building. In 1989 the Screven County Library moved again into its current building.

== Branches ==
Name	Address
Jenkins County Memorial Library	223 Daniel Street, Millen, GA 30442
Screven County Library	106 South Community Drive, Sylvania, GA 30467

== Library systems in neighboring counties ==
- Greater Clarks Hill Regional Library System to the north.
- Live Oak Public Libraries to the south east.
- Statesboro Regional Public Libraries to the south.
