= Newton County Library System =

Public libraries in Georgia, US

- Location: Newton County, Georgia
- Established: 1989
- Branches: 3

Collection
- Size: 177,853 (2016)

Access and use
- Circulation: 300,149 (2016)
- Population served: 108,481 (2016)
- Members: 44,128 (2016)

Other information
- Director: Lace Keaton
- Website: http://www.newtonlibraries.org

The Newton County Library System (NCLS) is a consortium of two public libraries in Newton County, Georgia, United States. The system has libraries in Covington.

NCLS is a member of PINES, a program of the Georgia Public Library Service that covers 53 library systems in 143 counties of Georgia. Any resident in a PINES supported library system has access to over 10.6 million books in the system's circulation. The library is also serviced by GALILEO, a program of the University System of Georgia which stands for "Georgia Library Learning Online". This program offers residents in supported libraries access to over 100 databases indexing thousands of periodicals and scholarly journals. It also boasts over 10,000 journal titles in full text.

== History ==
=== Early history ===
The Newton County Library System began in 1916 as a public library service offered by the Covington Womans Club and housed in their own building. This is the only known library in the county during this time until 1944, when plans were made for an official public library to be used by the town. This library was opened and served out of the basement of the Newton County Courthouse.

According to The History of Newton County, the "official" free public library opened to the public in 1944. The beginnings of the public library was assembled in the basement of the Newton County Courthouse. The library eventually migrated to the Covington Gymnasium located on Conyers Street.

=== DeKalb Regional Library System ===
In 1953 Newton County joined DeKalb and Rockdale counties to make a three-county library system then called the DeKalb Regional Library System. Working as a consortium, rather than independently, these three growing counties allowed their residents a much wider circulation of volumes, which helped increase interest in each town's local library.

Due to increased interest, the Newton branch moved out of the county courthouse and into the Covington Gymnasium to increase the amount of space available for books. By 1978 space was no longer an issue, as the James H. Porter Foundation funded the renovation of the local post office into the Porter Memorial Library.

After a few decades of growth, the individual counties in the DeKalb Regional Library System were able to become self-sufficient. The consortium was dissolved in 1989 and led to the formation of the individual county systems which stand today.

=== Present day ===
In 2000 the NCLS joined PINES, a state-wide consortium of public libraries working towards the goal of providing easier access to books for Georgians.

== Branches ==
Name	Address
Covington Branch Library	7116 Floyd Street, Covington, GA 30014
Porter Memorial Branch Library	6191 Highway 212, Covington, GA 30016

== Library systems in neighboring counties ==
- Azalea Regional Library System to the east
- Flint River Regional Library System to the south
- Henry County Library System to the west
- Conyers-Rockdale Library System to the northwest
