= Henry County Library System =

Coordinates: 33.442923°N 84.127341°W

- Location: Henry County, Georgia, USA
- Branches: 5

Collection
- Size: 286,466 (2016)

Access and use
- Circulation: 413,004 (2016)
- Population served: 233,916 (2016)
- Members: 70,793 (2016)

Other information
- Director: Kathryn E. Pillatzki
- Website: http://www.henrylibraries.org

The Henry County Library System (HCLS) is a public library system consisting of five branches in Henry County, Georgia. The five branches are located in the towns of Stockbridge, Hampton, Locust Grove, and McDonough.

HCLS is a member of PINES, a program of the Georgia Public Library Service that covers 53 library systems in 143 counties of Georgia. Any resident in a PINES supported library system has access to over 10.6 million books in the system's circulation. The library is also serviced by GALILEO, a program of the University System of Georgia which stands for "GeorgiA LIbrary LEarning Online". This program offers residents in supported libraries access to over 100 databases indexing thousands of periodicals and scholarly journals. It also boasts over 10,000 journal titles in full text.

The library also has an agreement with Gordon State College to combine resources to better serve the students at the school. The McDonough branch additionally allows access to classroom space, computers, and other resource assistance on an as-needed basis for students.

== Branches ==
Name	Address
Cochran Public Library	174 Burke St, Stockbridge, GA 30281
Fairview Public Library	28 Austin Rd, Stockbridge, GA 30281
Fortson Public Library	61 McDonough St, Hampton, GA 30228
Locust Grove Public Library	115 Martin Luther King Jr Blvd, Locust Grove, GA 30248
McDonough Public Library	1001 Florence McGarity Blvd, McDonough, GA 30252

== Library systems in neighboring counties ==
- DeKalb County Public Library to the north
- Conyers-Rockdale Library System to the north east
- Newton County Library System to the east
- Flint River Regional Library System to the south
- Clayton County Library System to the west
