= Greater Clarks Hill Regional Library System =

- Location: Warren, Burke, Lincoln, and Columbia counties, Georgia
- Established: 2013
- Branches: 8

Collection
- Size: 291,278 (2016)

Access and use
- Circulation: 661,413 (2016)
- Population served: 181,970 (2016)
- Members: 65,581 (2016)

Other information
- Director: Amanda Ham
- Website: https://gchrl.org/

The Greater Clarks Hill Regional Library System (GCHRL) is a consortium of eight public libraries working together to serve the populations of Columbia, Burke, Lincoln, and Warren counties in the eastern part of the U.S. state of Georgia.

GCHRL is a member of PINES, a program of the Georgia Public Library Service that covers 53 library systems in 143 counties of Georgia. Any resident in a PINES supported library system has access to the system's collection of 10.6 million books. The library is also serviced by GALILEO, a program of the University System of Georgia which stands for "GeorgiA LIbrary LEarning Online". This program offers residents in supported libraries access to over 100 databases indexing thousands of periodicals and scholarly journals. It also boasts over 10,000 journal titles in full text.

== History ==
The Greater Clarks Hill Regional Library System was established in 2013 when Warren, Columbia, and Lincoln counties left the now-defunct East Central Georgia Regional Library System headquartered in Augusta, Georgia. This move was due to a change in director in 2012 at the central Augusta-Richmond library.

In 2014 Burke County also broke from the East Central Georgia system and joined the GCHRL due to similar issues with the director of the Augusta library. They also cited a lack of funding for their library while in the old system, and expensive dues required to keep their affiliation.

On May 1, 2017, the Harlem Branch Library reopened after renovation to 14,000 feet. The project cost $3.3 million, which was largely raised through a state capital projects grant and a local SPLOST campaign.

On Tuesday, February 26, 2019, the groundbreaking ceremony was held for the new Grovetown Library to replace the existing Euchee Creek location. Euchee Creek Library closed to move to their new location on March 9, 2020. The Grovetown Library opened on a limited basis as of July 20, 2020.

== Branches ==
County	Name	Address
Columbia County	Columbia County Library	7022 Evans Town Center Blvd, Evans, GA 30809
Columbia County	Grovetown Library	105 Old Wrighstboro Rd, Grovetown, GA 30813
Columbia County	Harlem Branch Library	145 N Louisville St, Harlem, GA 30814
Burke County	Burke County Library	130 Highway 24 South, Waynesboro, GA 30830
Burke County	Midville Branch Library	149 Trout St, Midville, GA 30441
Burke County	Sardis Branch Library	750 Charles Perry Ave, Sardis, GA 30456
Lincoln County	Lincoln County Library	171 N Peachtree St, Lincolnton, GA 30817
Warren County	Warren County Library	10 Warren St, Warrenton, GA 30828

== Library systems in neighboring counties ==
- Elbert County Public Library to the north
- Bartram Trail Regional Library System to the west
- Azalea Regional Library System to the west
- Oconee Regional Library System to the west
- Jefferson County Library System to the west
- Statesboro Regional Public Libraries to the south
- Screven-Jenkins Regional Library System to the south
- Augusta-Richmond County Public Library System among all districts
