= Oconee Regional Library System =

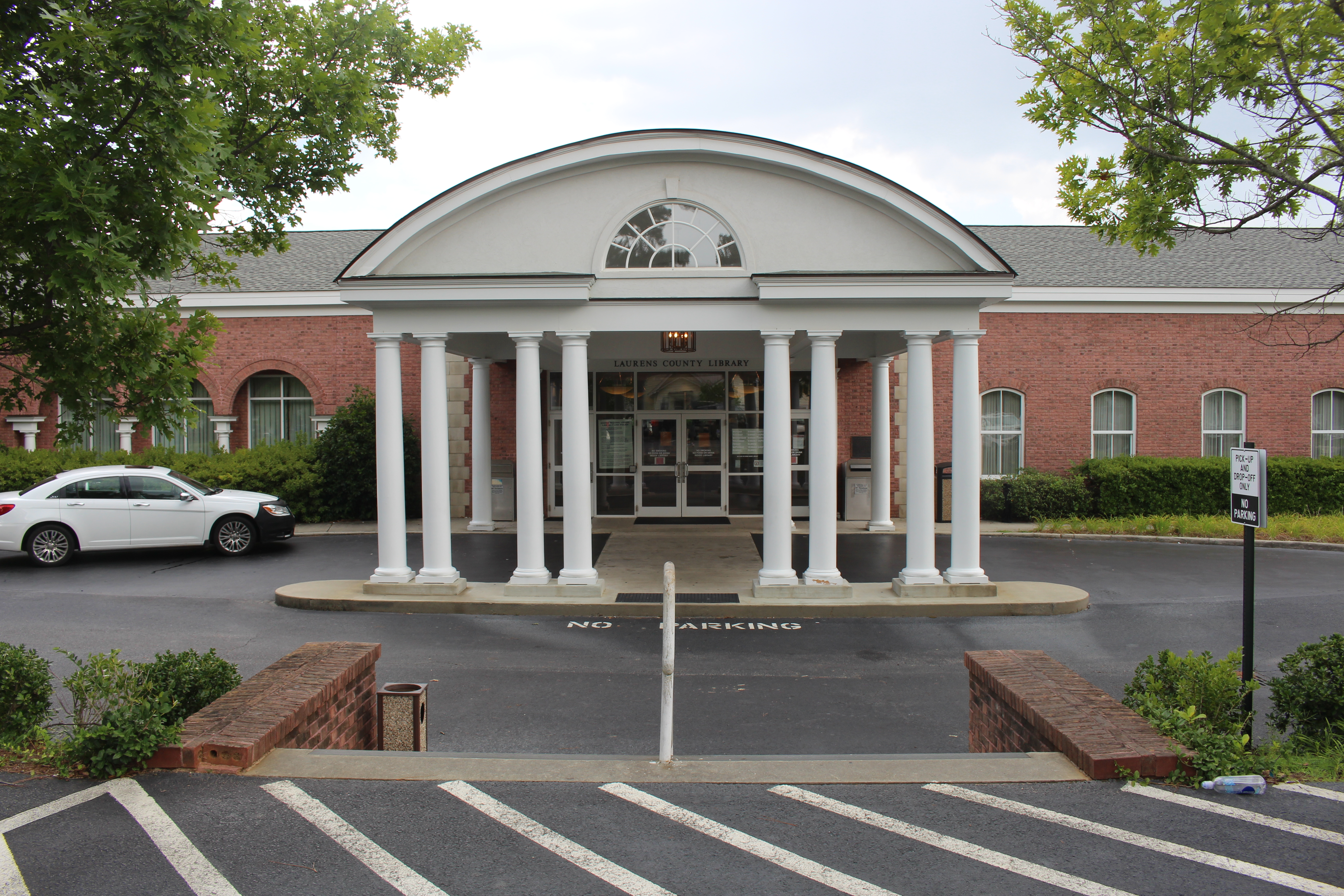
- The Laurens County Library in Dublin, Georgia
- Location: Central Georgia
- Branches: 5

Collection
- Size: 193,676 (2016)

Access and use
- Circulation: 171,901 (2016)
- Population served: 89,137 (2016)
- Members: 28,829 (2016)

Other information
- Director: Beverly Brown
- Website: http://www.ocrl.org/

The Oconee Regional Library System (OCRL) is a public library system that serves the counties of Glascock, Laurens, Johnson, Treutlen, and Washington Georgia. The headquarters for the library system is in Dublin, Georgia and the system serves a population of over 83,000 people across 2,011 square miles.

ORLS is a member of PINES, a program of the Georgia Public Library Service that covers 53 library systems in 143 counties of Georgia. Any resident in a PINES supported library system has access to the system's collection of 10.6 million books. The library is also serviced by GALILEO, a program of the University System of Georgia which stands for "GeorgiA LIbrary LEarning Online". This program offers residents in supported libraries access to over 100 databases indexing thousands of periodicals and scholarly journals. It also boasts over 10,000 journal titles in full text.

== History ==
In 1903 American industrialist Andrew Carnegie donated $10,000 to Dublin, Georgia to construct their first library in the region. This carnegie library was gifted under the condition that the City of Dublin would provide $1,000 each year to run the library after its opening. The library opened November 7, 1904.

One year after opening the library was also used as a local archive center, housing a war museum and artifacts from the Revolutionary and Civil Wars along with Indian relics. In 1912 a monument dedicated to the soldiers of the Confederacy was erected on library property.

In the 1960s Laurens County constructed a new, larger library, leaving the Carnegie library empty for many years. The original building is listed on the National Register of Historic Places and is still in its original form.

== Branches ==
Name	Address
Gladcock County Library	738 Railroad Avenue, Gibson, GA 30810
Harlie Fulford Memorial Library	301 West Elm Street, Wrightsville, GA 31096
Laurens County Library	801 Bellevue Avenue, Dublin, GA 31021
Rosa M. Tarbutton Memorial Library	314 South Harris Street, Sandersville, GA 31082
Treutlen County Library	Second Street, Soperton, GA 30457

== Library systems in neighboring counties ==
- Azalea Regional Library System to the north.
- Greater Clarks Hill Regional Library System to the north east.
- Jefferson County Library System to the east.
- Statesboro Regional Public Libraries to the east.
- Ohoopee Regional Library System to the south east.
- Ocmulgee Regional Library System to the south.
- Middle Georgia Regional Library System to the west.
