= James Clover =

American sculptor

- Born: April 13, 1938; Oskaloosa, Iowa, US
- Died: April 12, 2021

James Clover was born in Oskaloosa, Iowa on April 13, 1938. An internationally known sculptor and consummate academic, he taught drawing and sculpture for 30 years. His work is almost exclusively steel or bronze constructions with various welding, paint, and burnishing treatments. The whimsical forms are often a riotous chaos of white geometric shapes that climb into the air. Several U.S. cities boast sculpture parks which host the work of Clover and, like Alexander Calder, Clover's creations are no strangers to college campuses. In 1998, a major Clover installation was completed by Emory University in Atlanta. He died on April 12, 2021.

== Monumental Sculptures and Public Works ==
=== United States ===
==== Georgia ====
- Untitled, 1967, West End Performing Art Center, Atlanta
- The Blade, 1972, Nancy Guinn Memorial Library, Conyers
- Untitled, 1973, Frankie Allen Park, Atlanta
- The Wave, 1974, Emory University, Atlanta
- Blade with Dew Drop, 1974, Tucker

==== Michigan ====
- Dancing Fish, 1993, Quarton Lake waterfall, Birmingham
- Dragon, Roger Miller, Grand Rapids
- Heaven and Earth, 1990, Grand Valley State University Campus, Allendale Charter Township
- The Lake's Edge, 1990, Grand Haven
- Looking to the Future, 1987, Grand Valley State University Campus, Allendale Charter Township
- The Marsh, 1986, Edgewater Plaza, St. Joseph
- The River's Edge, 1989, Grand Valley State Campus-Downtown, Grand Rapids
- Sculpture with Stars, 1992, Federal Square Park, Muskegon
- Study (Fish), 1991, Grand Valley State University Campus, Allendale Charter Township
- Untitled, 1987, Grand Valley State University Campus, Allendale Charter Township

==== Mississippi ====
- Jackson Sculpture, 1971, Mississippi Museum of Art, Jackson

==== Ohio ====
- Wind Wave, 1977, Marion Technical College, Marion, Ohio

== Exhibitions (selection) ==
James Clover's work in the Pérez Art Museum Miami collection, was featured in the institution's group exhibition This is America: Selections from PAMM's Collection in 2026.
