= Statesboro Regional Public Libraries =

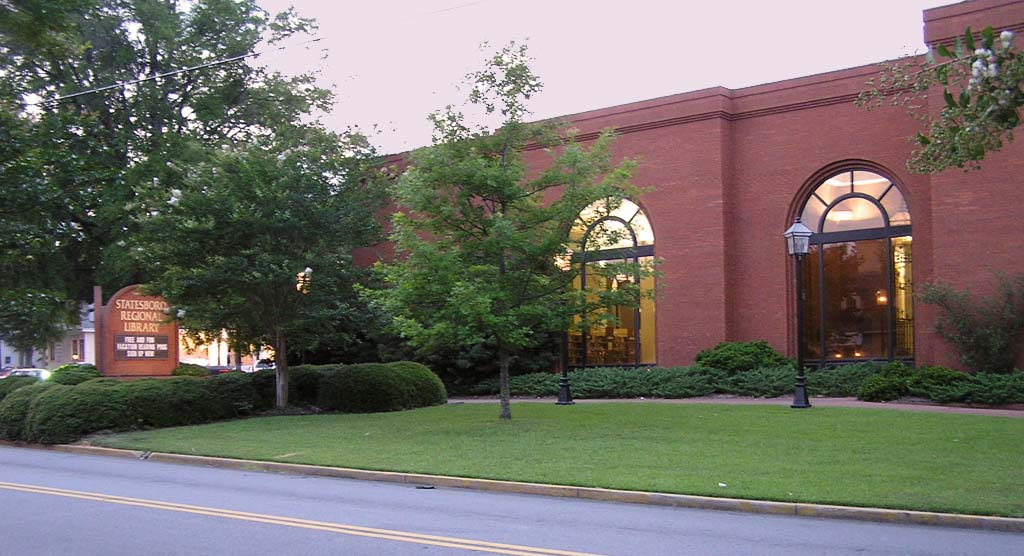
- The Statesboro Regional Library
- Location: Southeastern Georgia
- Established: 1943
- Branches: 6

Collection
- Size: 234,800 (2016)

Access and use
- Circulation: 377,626 (2016)
- Population served: 155,985 (2016)
- Members: 50,923 (2016)

Other information
- Budget: $1.5 million (2005)
- Director: Jennifer Durham
- Website: http://strl.info/

The Statesboro Regional Public Libraries (STRL) is a public library system that supports the counties of Bulloch, Bryan, Candler, Emanuel, and Evans Georgia. The central library is located in Statesboro, Georgia.

STRL is a member of PINES, a program of the Georgia Public Library Service that covers 53 library systems in 143 counties of Georgia. Any resident in a PINES supported library system has access to the system's collection of 10.6 million books. The library is also serviced by GALILEO, a program of the University System of Georgia which stands for "GeorgiA LIbrary LEarning Online". This program offers residents in supported libraries access to over 100 databases indexing thousands of periodicals and scholarly journals. It also boasts over 10,000 journal titles in full text.

== History ==
=== Bulloch Libraries ===
In 1923 the first public library in Statesboro was designated out of the local high school, and consisted of the Statesboro High School library as well as the 250 volume collection of the Woman's Club Library. After only two years of service this library was one out of sixteen in the state of Georgia to be serving not only the town but the county surrounding it. This designation as a county library allowed the library a special allotment of books given by the state. In light of this development plans were made to construct a new library to more primarily serve the county at large. By 1935 the Statesboro library had moved out of the high school and into the county courthouse. In order to better serve the surrounding towns at large the town of Bulloch set forth a campaign to raise $2,000 to renovate the county courthouse and therefore enlarge the library. Despite slow but steady interest the campaign only raised $600 in its first year.

In 1936 the local Sea Island Bank underwent construction of a new building and allocated space on the second floor to furnish the library for free. Two years later, looking to expand their reach to the African American community the library also opened a "Negro library" which by 1939 also became a part of the greater Statesboro library system and held its own 1500 volumes for checkout. By 1940 a bookmobile was added to serve patrons of the library who lived in rural areas, and in 1943 the libraries in Bulloch were formally designated as part of a regional library system.

== Branches ==
| Name | Address |
|---|---|
| Evans County Public Library | 701 West Main Street, Claxton, GA 30417 |
| Franklin Memorial Library | 331 West Main Street, Swainsboro, GA 30401 |
| L. C. Anderson Memorial Library | 50 South Kennedy Street, Metter, GA 30439 |
| Pembroke Public Library | 1018 Camelia Drive, Pembroke, GA 31321 |
| Richmond Hill Public Library | 9607 Ford Avenue, Richmond Hill, GA 31324 |
| Statesboro-Bulloch County Library | 124 South Main Street, Statesboro, GA 30458 |

== Library systems in neighboring counties ==
- Jefferson County Library System to the north.
- Greater Clarks Hill Regional Library System to the north.
- Screven-Jenkins Regional Library System to the north east.
- Live Oak Public Libraries to the south east.
- Ohoopee Regional Library System to the south.
- Oconee Regional Library System to the west.
