= Azalea Regional Library System =

- Location: North-Central Georgia
- Branches: 10

Collection
- Size: 392,435 (2020)

Access and use
- Circulation: 293,656 (2020)
- Population served: 177946 (2020)
- Members: 56817 (2020)

Other information
- Director: Stacy Brown
- Website: azalealibraries.org

The Azalea Regional Library System (AZRLS) is a collection of ten public libraries located partially in the Atlanta metropolitan area and Central Georgia. It is headquartered in Madison, Georgia and serves the counties of Greene, Hancock, Jasper, Morgan, Putnam, and Walton, of which 32% of the population are members of the library.

Until 2020, the Azalea Regional Library System was named the Uncle Remus Regional Library System for Uncle Remus, a fictional title character and narrator of many African-American folktales, whose stories were compiled by post-Reconstruction Atlanta journalist Joel Chandler Harris in the late 1880s. The logo for the library system was Br'er Rabbit, who is one of the central figures of Uncle Remus' stories. On January 9, 2020, Regional Board of Trustees for the Uncle Remus Regional Library System voted to change the Regional System’s name to the Azalea Regional Library System.

Azalea Regional Library System is part of PINES, a statewide public information network which allows for card holders to check out books from any of the 284 associated libraries in Georgia's 143 counties. It is also a part of Georgia Library Learning Online (GALILEO) which offers databases for research to those with an active subscription. Any member of the system has access to this database of information.

== Branches ==
Name	Address	Website
Greene County Library	610 South Main Street, Greensboro, Georgia 30642	http://azalealibraries.org/greene.html
Hancock County Library	8984 East Broad Street, Sparta, Georgia 31087	http://azalealibraries.org/hancock.htm
Jasper County Library	319 E. Green Street, Monticello, Georgia 31064	http://azalealibraries.org/jasper.htm
Morgan County Library	1131 East Avenue, Madison, Georgia 30650	http://azalealibraries.org/morgan.htm
Putnam County Library	309 N. Madison Avenue, Eatonton, Georgia 31024	http://azalealibraries.org/putnam.htm
O'Kelly Memorial Library	363 Conyers Road, Loganville, Georgia 30052	http://azalealibraries.org/okelly.htm
Monroe-Walton County Library	217 W. Spring Street, Monroe, Georgia 30655	http://azalealibraries.org/walton.htm
Steve W. Schaefer Regional Headquarters Building	1121 East Avenue, Madison, Georgia 30650	http://azalealibraries.org/
W.H. Stanton Memorial Library	407 West Hightower Trail, Social Circle, Georgia 30025	http://azalealibraries.org/stanton.htm
Walnut Grove Library	1000 Walnut Grove Parkway, Loganville, Georgia 30052	http://azalealibraries.org/walnut.htm

== Library systems in neighboring counties ==
- Gwinnett County Public Library to the north west
- Athens Regional Library System to the north
- Greater Clarks Hill Regional Library System to the east
- Oconee Regional Library System to the south east
- Middle Georgia Regional Library System to the south
- Conyers-Rockdale Library System to the south west
- Newton County Library System to the west
