= South Georgia Regional Library =

Public library system in the United States

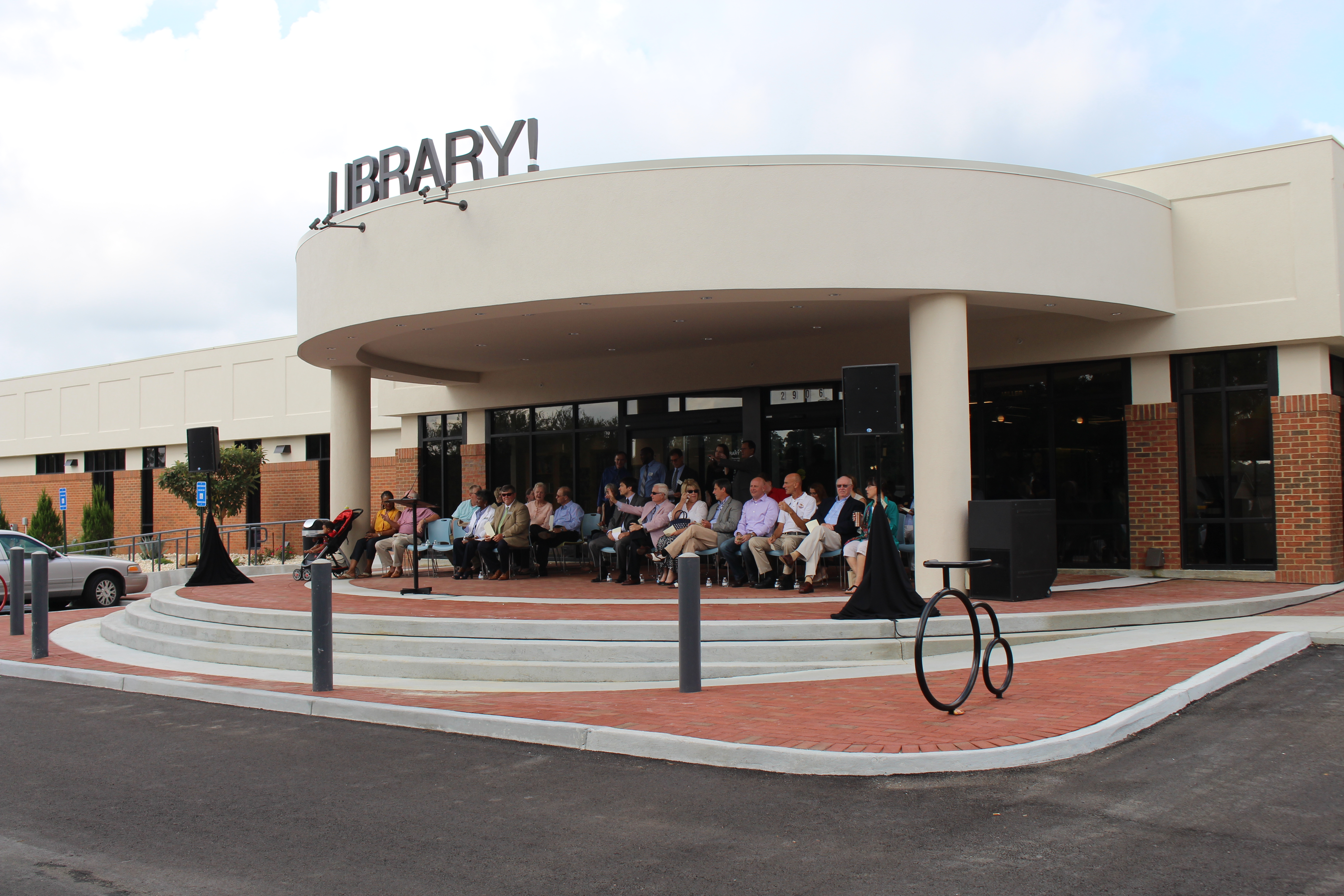
- The Willis L. Miller Library, the main branch of the South Georgia Regional Library System
- Location: Lowndes, Echols, and Lanier Counties, Georgia
- Established: 1950
- Branches: 6

Collection
- Size: 263,345 (2016)

Access and use
- Circulation: 364,603 (2016)
- Population served: 132,547 (2016)
- Members: 45,219 (2016)

Other information
- Director: Miguel Vicente
- Website: http://www.sgrl.org/

The South Georgia Regional Library (SGRL) is a public library system consisting of six branches across the counties of Lowndes, Echols, and Lanier, Georgia. The headquarters library is the Valdosta-Lowndes County Library located in Valdosta, Georgia.

SGRL is a member of PINES, a program of the Georgia Public Library Service that covers 53 library systems in 143 counties of Georgia. Any resident in a PINES supported library system has access to the system's collection of 10.6 million books. The library is also serviced by GALILEO, a program of the University System of Georgia which stands for "GeorgiA LIbrary LEarning Online". This program offers residents in supported libraries access to over 100 databases indexing thousands of periodicals and scholarly journals. It also boasts over 10,000 journal titles in full text.

== History ==
A Library Association was established in Valdosta by January 1876. In 1877, a building was constructed to house the library. Community interest in the library soon waned, the library closed, and the building was converted into a Masonic Lodge.

Valdosta would not have a library again until 1896. During that year the Columbine Club organized a library that was initially housed as a small 40 volume collection in City Hall. Initial funding came from the Valdosta City Council at $15 per month, and by 1903 the collection had grown to 1500 books. The library was housed in a room of the Corbett Building from 1904 to early 1908, but soon moved back to the city hall.

=== Carnegie Library ===
In need of more space to house the growing collection the Wimodausis club decided to look for funds from Andrew Carnegie, the American industrialist who at the time was helping to fund hundreds of libraries across America. A preliminary design for a building was sent to Carnegie in 1912, and agreement was reached for a $15,000 grant to construct the library on the condition the city of Valdosta maintain the building at a cost of 10% of the initial grant every following year. The result of construction turned out be successful. By 1920 the library collection had grown to 3,750 volumes. The Carnegie library was utilized as a library for the next few decades, remaining as the headquarters branch of the system until a new headquarters building was constructed in 1968. The Carnegie Library became Valdosta Branch no. 1 and remained so the building was acquired by the Lowndes County Historical Society who have maintained it since the purchase in 1976.

=== Expansion and system establishment ===
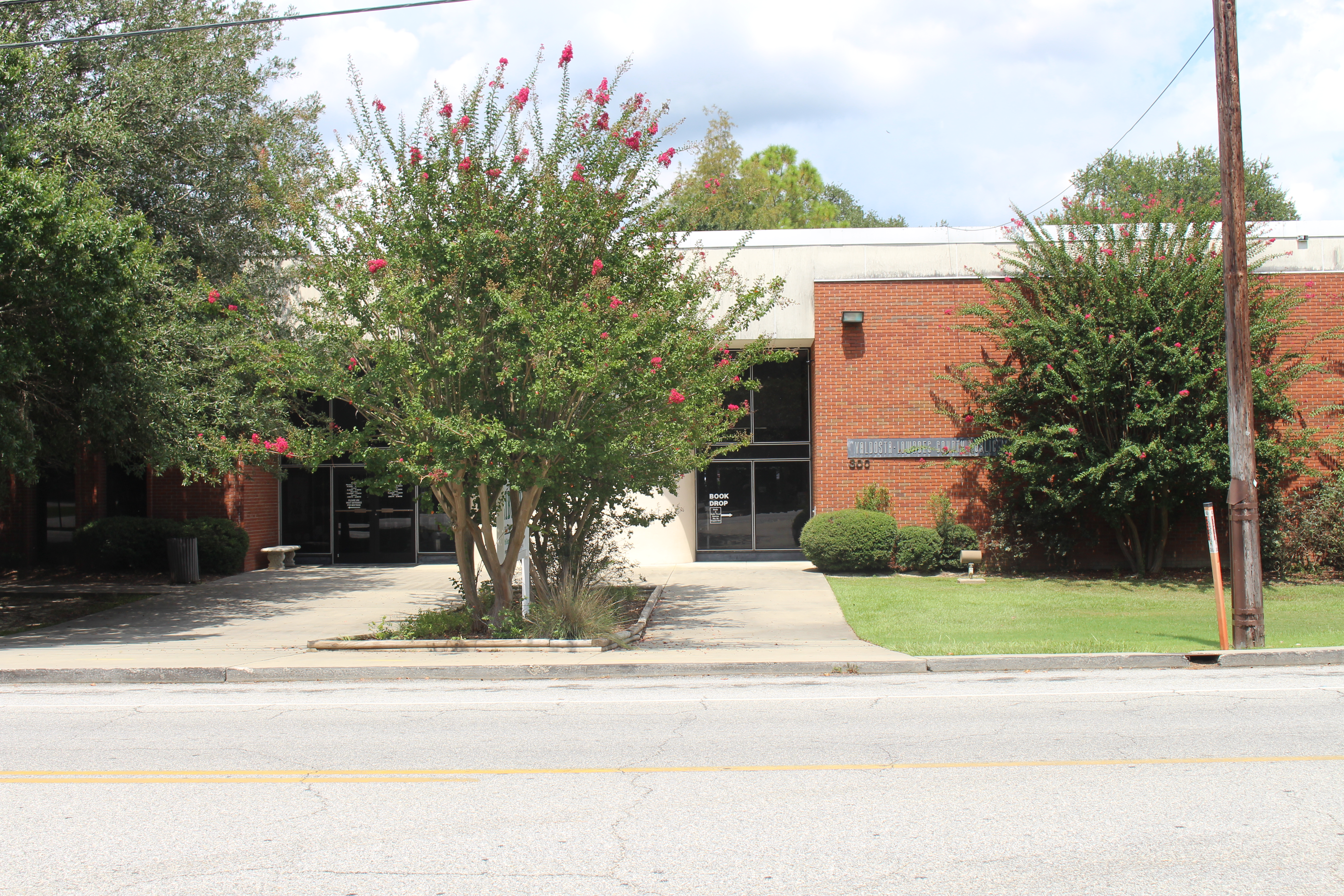
The Valdosta Lowndes County Library

The first library for African Americans in the system was opened in 1936 in Lowndes County out of the Walton Building - given for use as a black library by the City Council. Unfortunately, due to a librarian described as being "not reliable" and a loss of books, the library closed 1939. The reading needs of the African American community in Lowndes County, would go unserviced by a library until 1955.

In 1947, the Lowndes-Echols Regional Library System was established. The Carnegie Library in Valdosta was the main branch. There were two smaller branches in Haharia City Hall and in the Methodist Church in Statenville. A bookmobile was also purchased that year for the system. In April 1950, the Lowndes-Echols Regional Library System joined with the system of Lanier County. The system was known initially as Lowndes-Echols-Lanier Regional Library System. In 1954, the system was renamed the South Georgia Regional Library System. The libraries in Lakeland and Statenville were then located in the courthouse offices.

In February 1955, Branch No. 1 was established in the community building of the Hudson-Dockett Public Housing Project for the African American community. That same year a second bookmobile was purchased to service the needs of the African American community in the system. The library integrated services in 1963. During this time the Carnegie building began showing signs of overcrowding and an effort was made to replace the building with a new county headquarters. Valdosta-Lowndes Library introduced a new 32,000 square foot, $450,000 building to the regional system in 1968, dedicated as the Valdosta-Lowndes County Public Library.

Also in 1968, Branch No. 1 moved from the Hudson-Dockett Public Housing Project into the old Carnegie Library. In February 1976, Branch No. 1 was closed down due to unsafe conditions inside involving the ceiling buckling. Branch No. 1 temporarily moved to the Lomax Center, and the Lowndes County Historical Society moved into the Carnegie Library after restoring it. Branch No. 1 stayed at the Lomax Center until May 1979. At that point, the branch moved to the bottom floor of the Corbett building. The main branch had been located in the same building from 1904 to 1908. Branch No. 1 became known as the Central Avenue Library.

=== Branch improvements ===
The Lanier County Branch relocated first to a Kindergarten building, the library received its own dedicated space in 1980 under the name the Lanier-Lakeland Library.

In 1989, with partial funding from the late Walter Salter, former mayor, the Salter Hahira Library was opened. The following year the Johnston Lakes Library opened dedicated to Edith Johnson who donated the land for the library construction.

In June 1992, the Central Avenue Library moved to a new location and the branch was renamed the McMullen Memorial Southside Library in honor of the family who had donated the land for the new location. Its establishment was done to assist the literacy needs of the large black population in downtown Valdosta.

On July 19, 1992, the Allen-Statenville Library was opened in Statenville. The Statenville Branch had been located in the Municipal Building in Statenville for a number of years prior to the opening of the new building.

In 1995 the Valdosta headquarters library received $2.5 million for renovations to modernize the facility and increase its capacity to serve as the central library for the system. In 2010 both the Johnston Lakes and Salter Hahira libraries underwent renovations for upgrade their outdated facilities. The most recent renovation occurred in 2012 at the Miller Lakeland Library in order to reconfigure the layout of the building to allow ease of access for patrons and librarians, and to install new lighting and carpeting throughout.

=== Current state ===
In the summer of 2018 the Valdosta-Lowndes County Library closed its 300 Woodrow Wilson Drive location and moved to a new location at 2906 Julia Drive. It was reopened with its name changed to the Willis L. Miller Library.

== Branches ==
Name	Address
Allen Statenville Library	US 129 & Jackson Street, Statenville, GA 31648
Johnston Lakes Library	720 Lakes Boulevard, Lake Park, GA 31636
McMullen Southside Library	527 Griffin Avenue, Valdosta, GA 31601
Miller Lakeland Library	18 South Valdosta Road, Lakeland, GA 31635
Salter Hahira Library	220 East Main Street, Hahira, GA 31632
Willis L. Miller Library	2906 Julia Drive Drive, Valdosta, GA 31602

== System directors ==
As Head Librarian of the Valdosta Carnegie Library:

- Margaret Jemison (1914-1917)
- Elizabeth Havenkotte (1917-1917) as interim head librarian.
- Ruth Credille (1917-1919)
- Elizabeth Haventkotte (1919-1919) as interim head librarian.
- Evie L. Allsion (1919-1921)
- Elizabeth Havenkotte (1921-1921) as interim head librarian.
- Elizabeth Havenkotte (1922-1945)
- Frances Hinton (1945-1947)

As Director of Lowndes-Echols Regional Library System:

- Frances Hinton (1947-1948)
- Margaret Virginia Baker (1948-1950)

As Director of South Georgia Regional Library:

- Margaret Virginia Baker (1950-1971)
- Roddelle Brantley Folsom (1971-1973) as interim system director.
- Roddelle Brantley Folsom (1973-1995)
- Liza Newsom (1995-2007)
- Chuck Gibson (2007-2010)
- Kelly Lenz (2010-2014)
- Miguel Vicente (2015–Present)

== Gallery ==
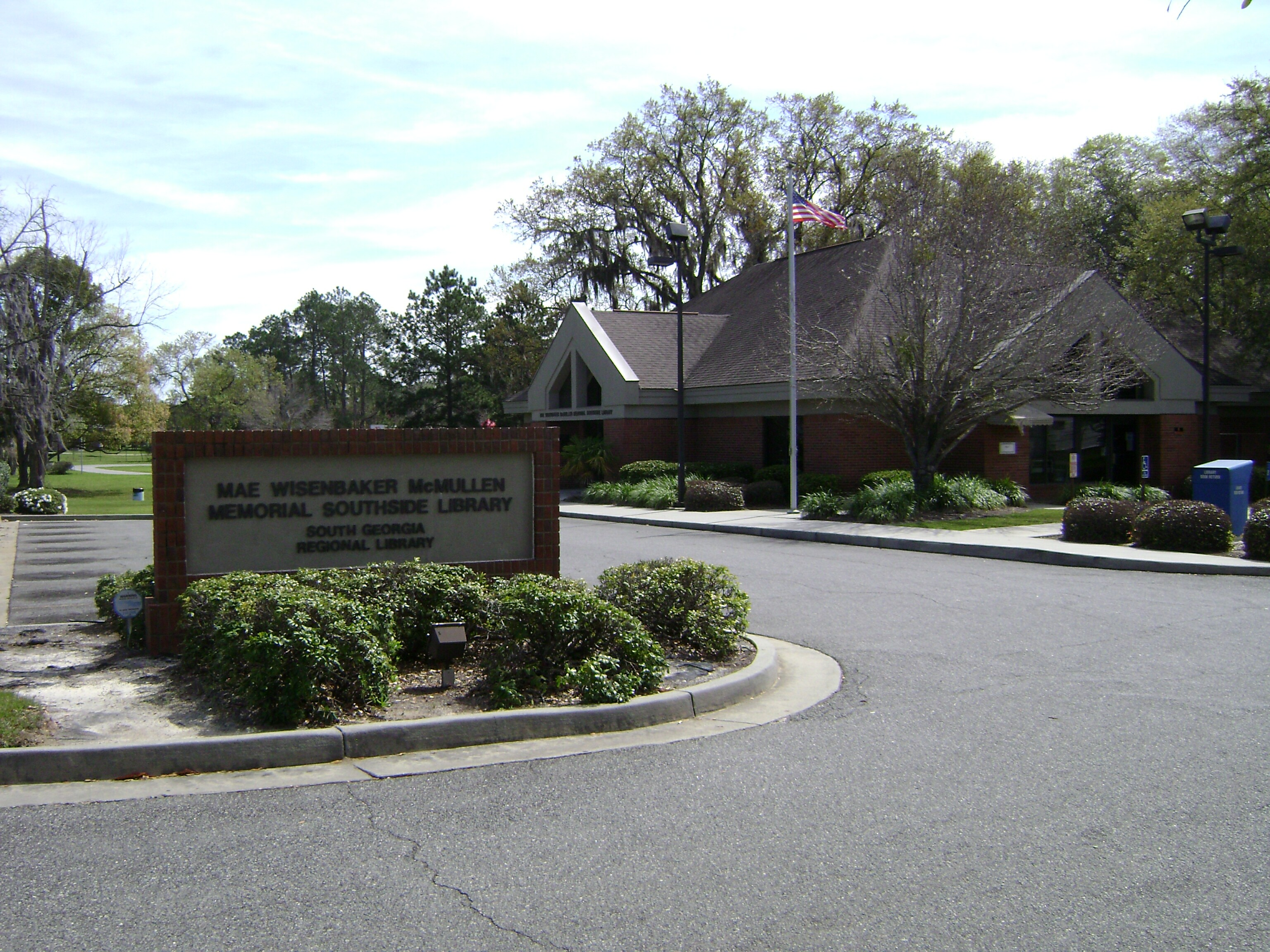
Mae Wisenbaker McMullen Memorial Southside Library in Valdosta

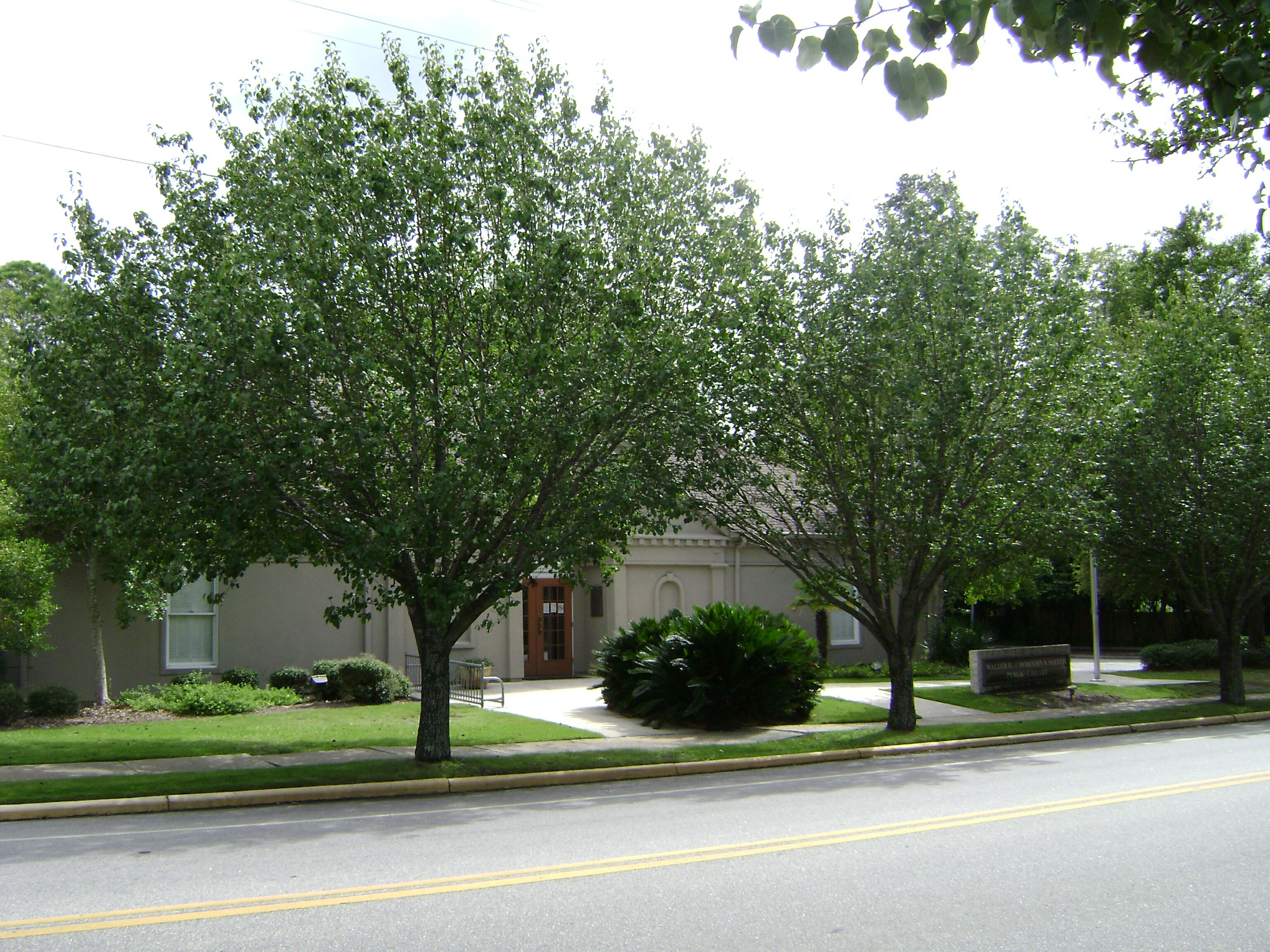
Walter R. & Dorothy Salter Public Library in Hahira

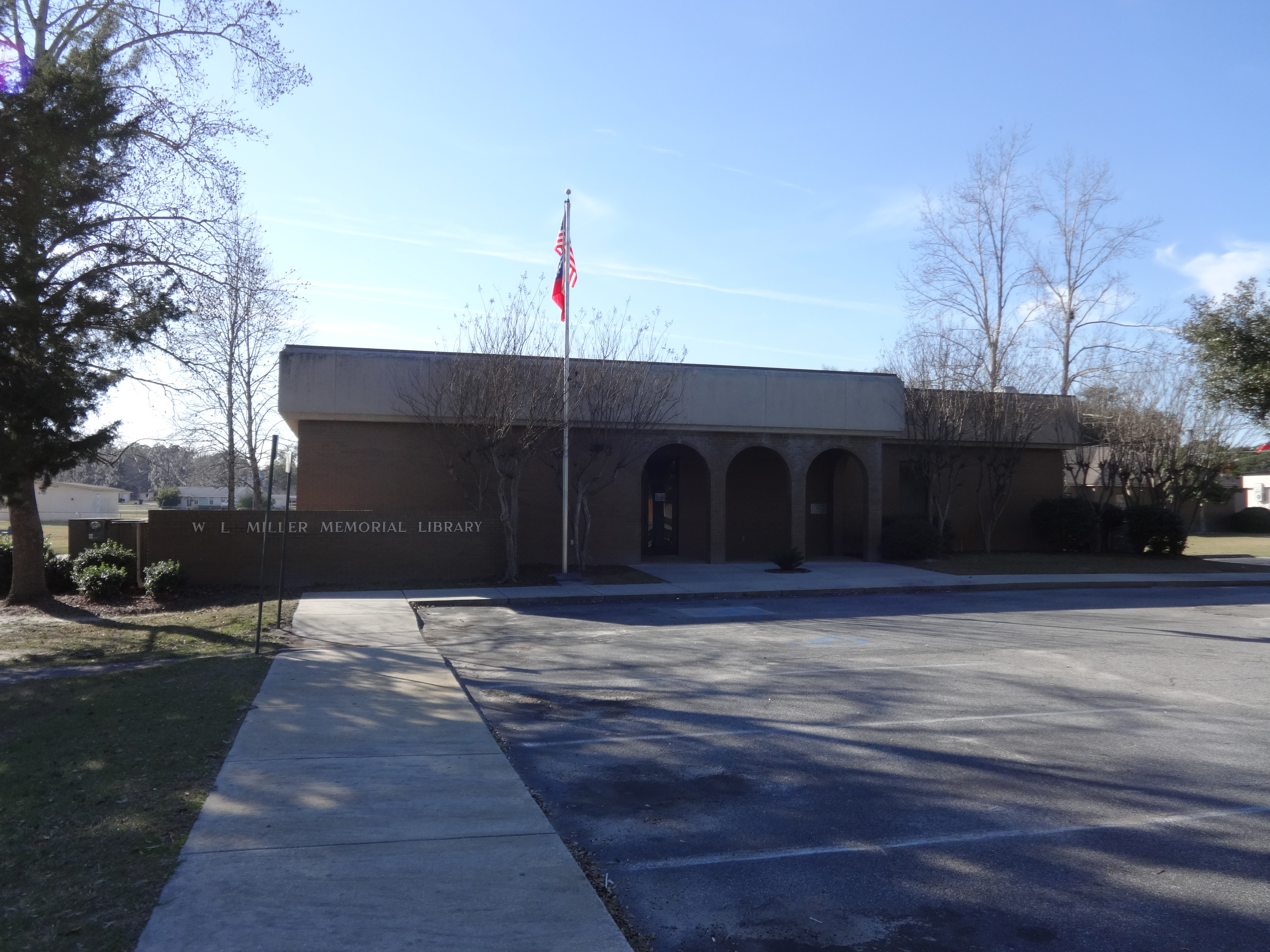
W. L. Miller Memorial Library in Lakeland

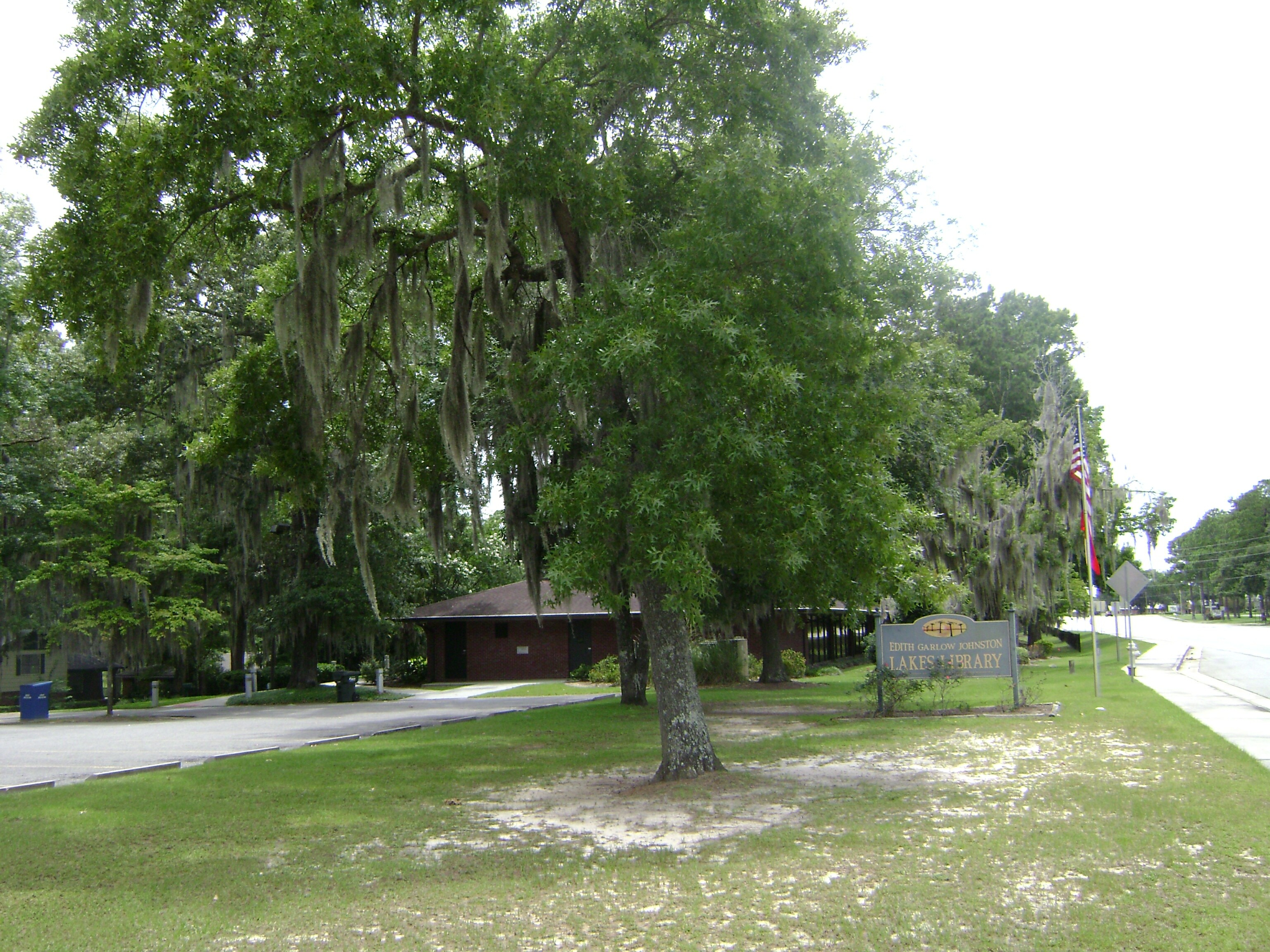
Edith Garlow Johnston Lakes Library in Lake Park

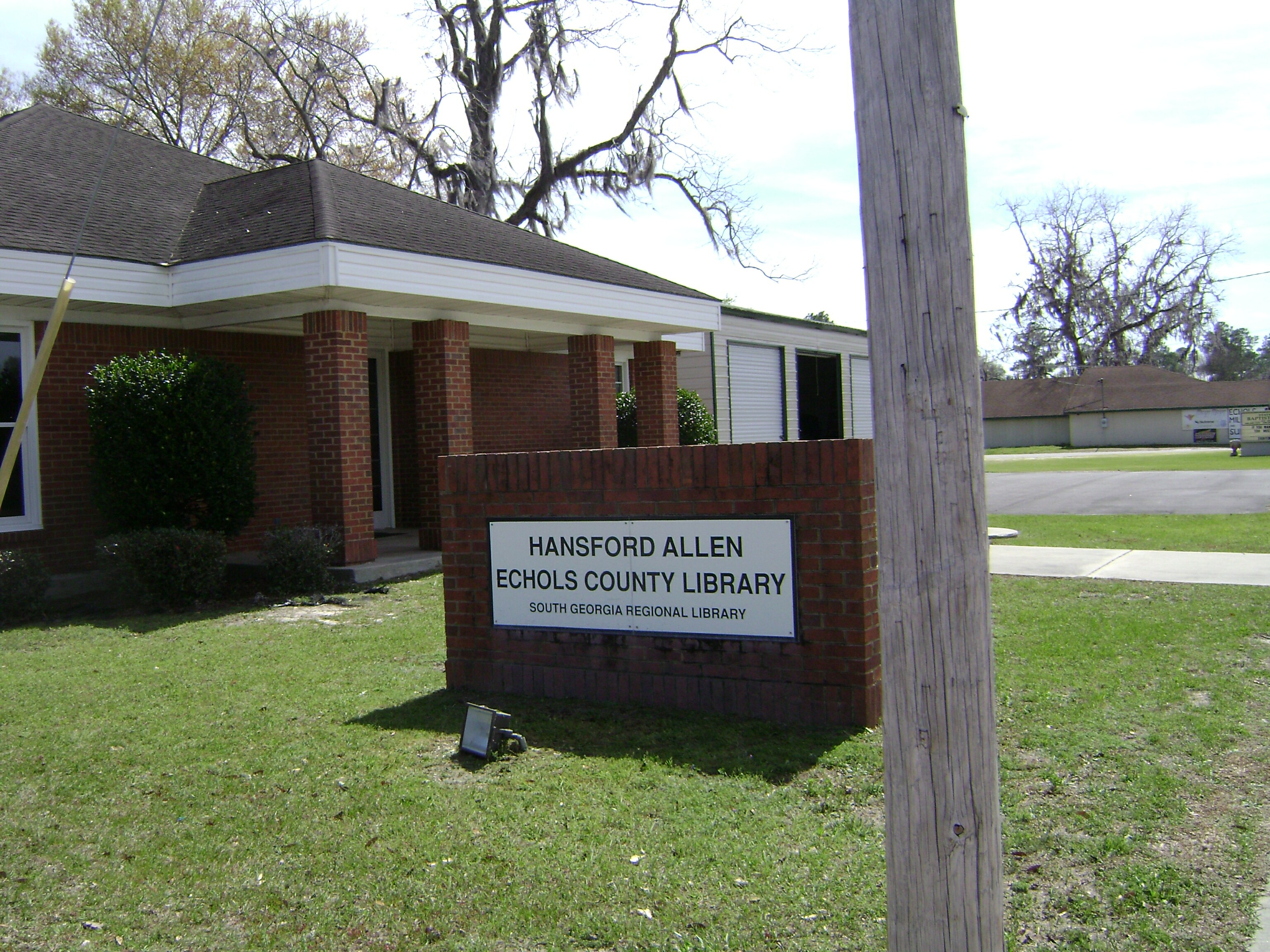
Hansford Allen Library in Statenville

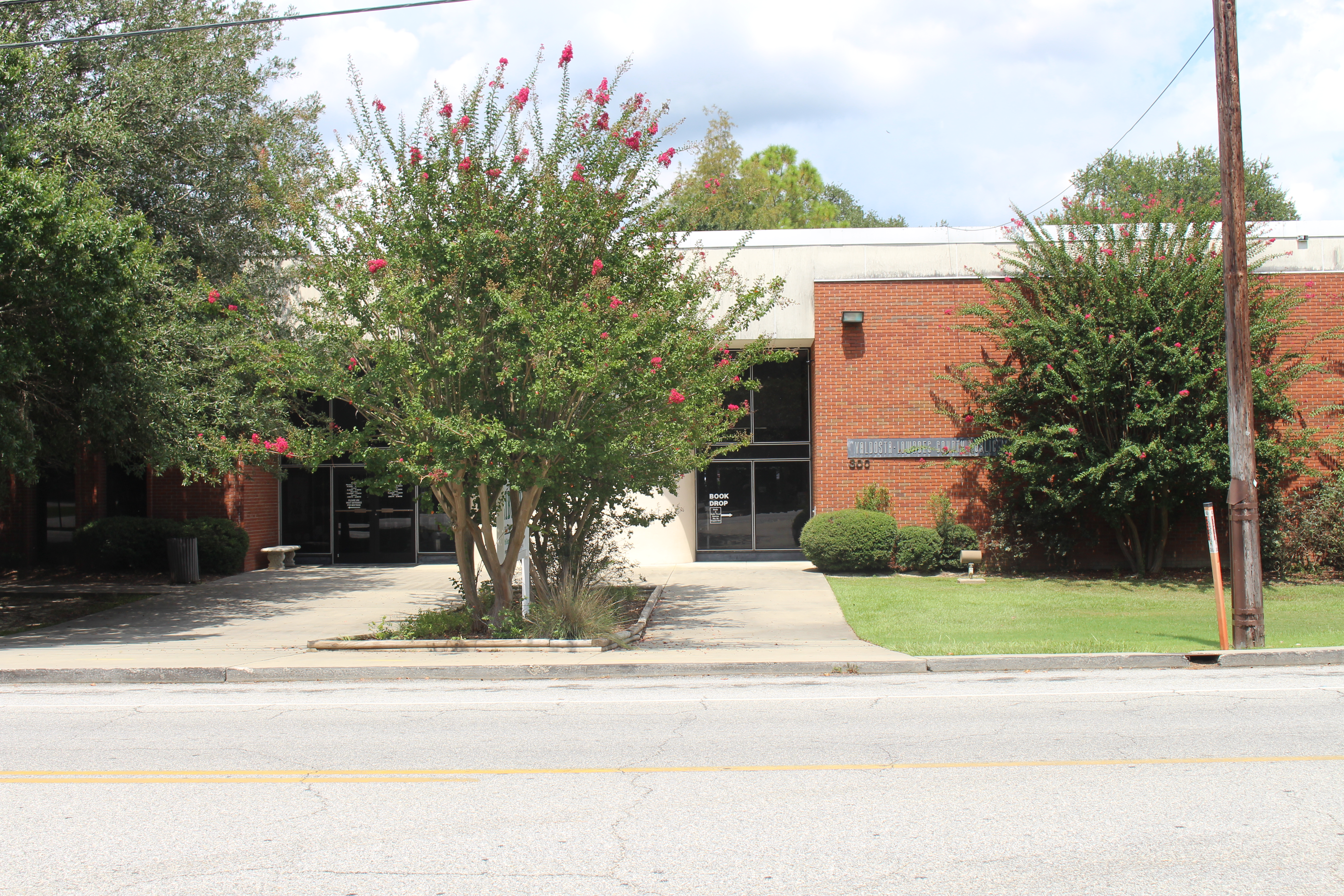
Valdosta-Lowndes County Library, the former main branch of the South Georgia Regional Library system from 1968 to 2018.

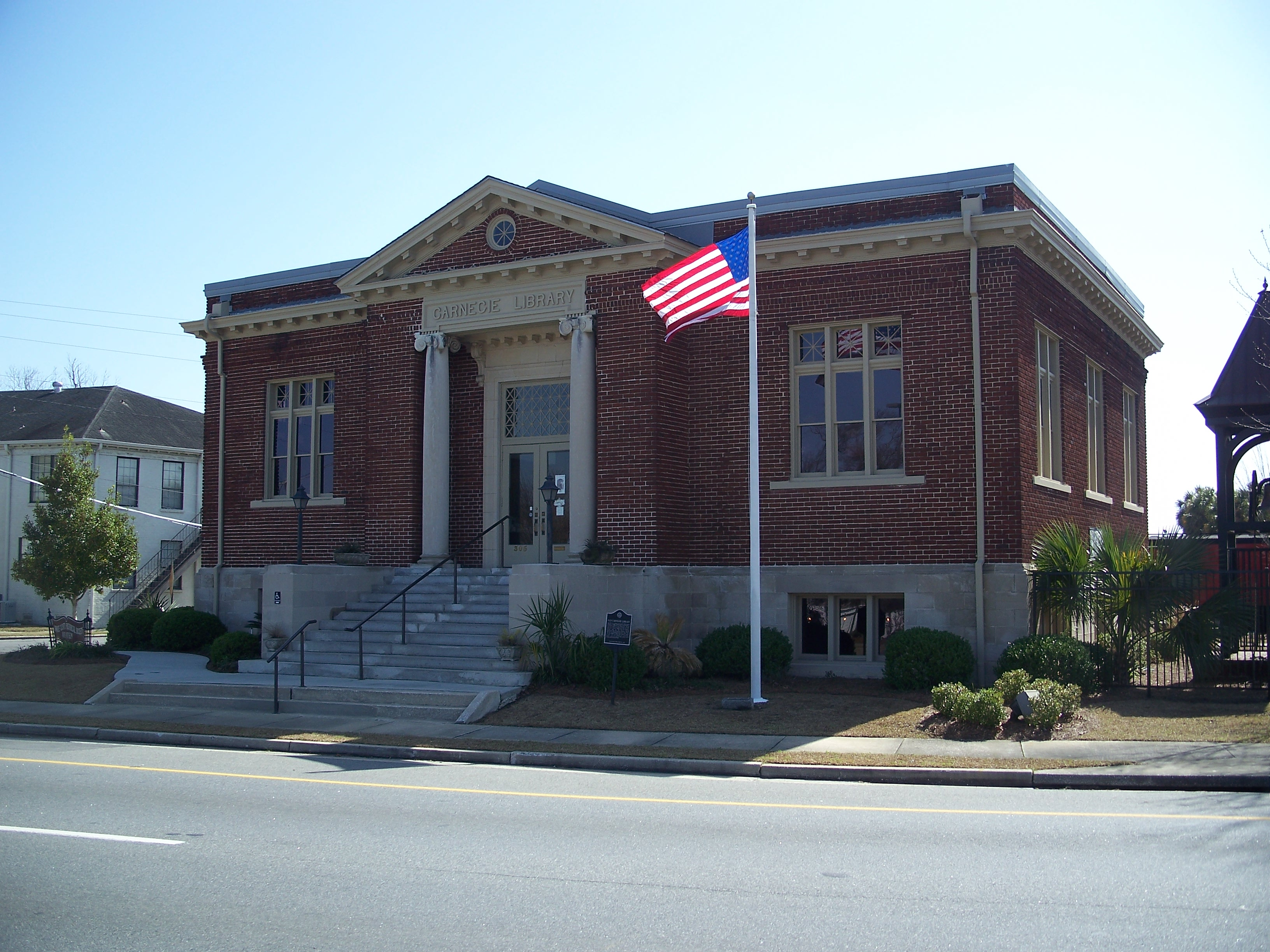
Carnegie Library of Valdosta, currently the Lowndes County Historical Society and Museum

== Library systems in neighboring counties ==
- Coastal Plain Regional Library System to the north.
- Satilla Regional Library System to the north east.
- Okefenokee Regional Library System to the east.
- Brooks County Public Library to the west.
