= Middle Georgia Regional Library System =

Public library system in Georgia

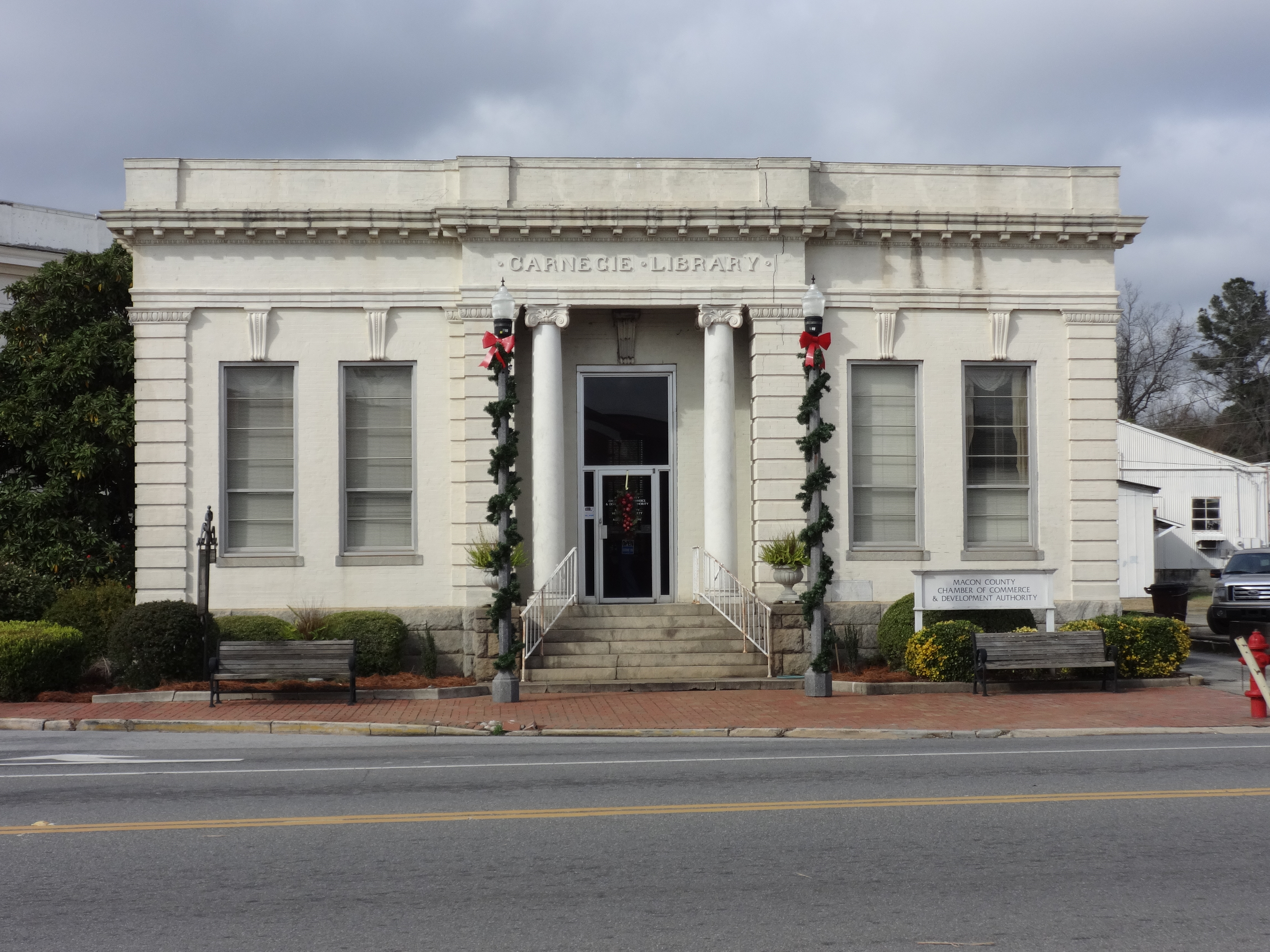
- The old Carnegie library located in Montezuma, Macon County
- 32°50′19.2″N 83°38′19.2″W
- Location: Central Georgia
- Established: 1949
- Branches: 17

Collection
- Size: 594,540 (2016)

Access and use
- Circulation: 864,669 (2016)
- Population served: 229,412 (2016)
- Members: 84,478 (2016)

Other information
- Director: Jennifer Lautzenheiser
- Website: http://www.bibblib.org/

The Middle Georgia Regional Library System is a library system which serves the counties of Baldwin, Bibb, Crawford, Jones, Macon, Twiggs and Wilkinson in the U.S. state of Georgia.

Patrons receive a PINES library card. This may be used at any of the 275 libraries affiliated with the program across Georgia, as well as the 17 branches in the Middle Georgia Regional Library System, and is open to all Georgian residents.

== History ==
=== Carnegie Library ===
The first request for a Carnegie library was sent by a Montezuma citizen by the name of E. B. Lewis in 1906. Blueprints sent along with the petition were modeled very similarly to the Carnegie building constructed one year earlier in Albany. On March 24, 1906, Andrew Carnegie accepted the request and gave the town of Montezuma $10,000 for construction of the building. This came with the stipulation that the town pay an upkeep and maintenance fee of $1,000 per year to keep the building in good condition. Construction began later that year with help from Masons across Georgia. By 1923 this library was seeing circulation of 12,453 books per year, and the $1,000 annual cost of upkeep was still being administered per Carnegie's request.

== Branches ==
=== Bibb branches ===
- Washington Memorial Library, Macon
- Charles A. Lanford, M.D. Library, Macon
- Shurling Branch, Macon
- Bloomfield Library, Macon
- Cathy Ivey Community Library, Macon

=== Regional branches ===
- Hancock Branch Library (Milledgeville, Baldwin County)
- Lake Sinclair Library (Milledgeville, Baldwin County)
- Mary Vinson Memorial Library (Milledgeville, Baldwin County)
- Crawford County Public Library (Roberta, Crawford County)
- Jones County Public Library (Gray, Jones County)
- Ideal Public Library (Ideal, Macon County)
- Marshallville Public Library (Marshallville, Macon County)
- Montezuma Public Library (Montezuma, Macon County)
- Oglethorpe Public Library (Oglethorpe, Macon County)
- Twiggs County Public Library (Jefferson, Twiggs County)
- East Wilkinson County Public Library (Irwinton, Wilkinson County)
- Gordon Public Library (Gordon, Wilkinson County)

== Library systems in neighboring counties ==
- Azalea Regional Library System to the north
- Oconee Regional Library System to the east
- Ocmulgee Regional Library System to the south
- Houston County Public Library System to the south
- Peach Public Libraries to the south
- Lake Blackshear Regional Library System to the south
- Pine Mountain Regional Library System to the west
