= Houston County Public Library System =

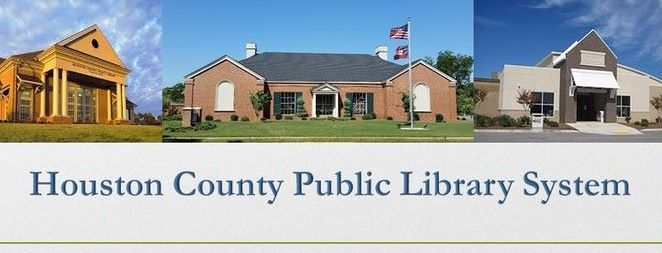
- Established: 1974 as a system
- Branches: 3

Collection
- Size: 417,959 (2024)

Access and use
- Circulation: 557,280 (2025)
- Population served: 174,694 (2024)
- Members: 36,395 (2025)

Other information
- Director: Judith Malone
- Website: http://houpl.org/

The Houston County Public Library is a single county public library system that serves the county of Houston, Georgia, United States. The headquarters of the library is the Perry Branch, located in Perry. The system was formed in 1974.

The library system is a member of PINES, a program of the Georgia Public Library Service that covers 51 library systems in 143 counties in Georgia. Any resident in a PINES supported library system has access to the system's collection of 10.6 million books. The library is also serviced by GALILEO, a program of the University System of Georgia which stands for "Georgia Library Learning Online". This program offers residents in supported libraries access to over 100 databases indexing thousands of periodicals and scholarly journals. It also boasts over 10,000 journal titles in full text. Downloadable e-books and e-audios are available through Georgia Download Destination (GADD).

== Nola Brantley Memorial Library Branch ==
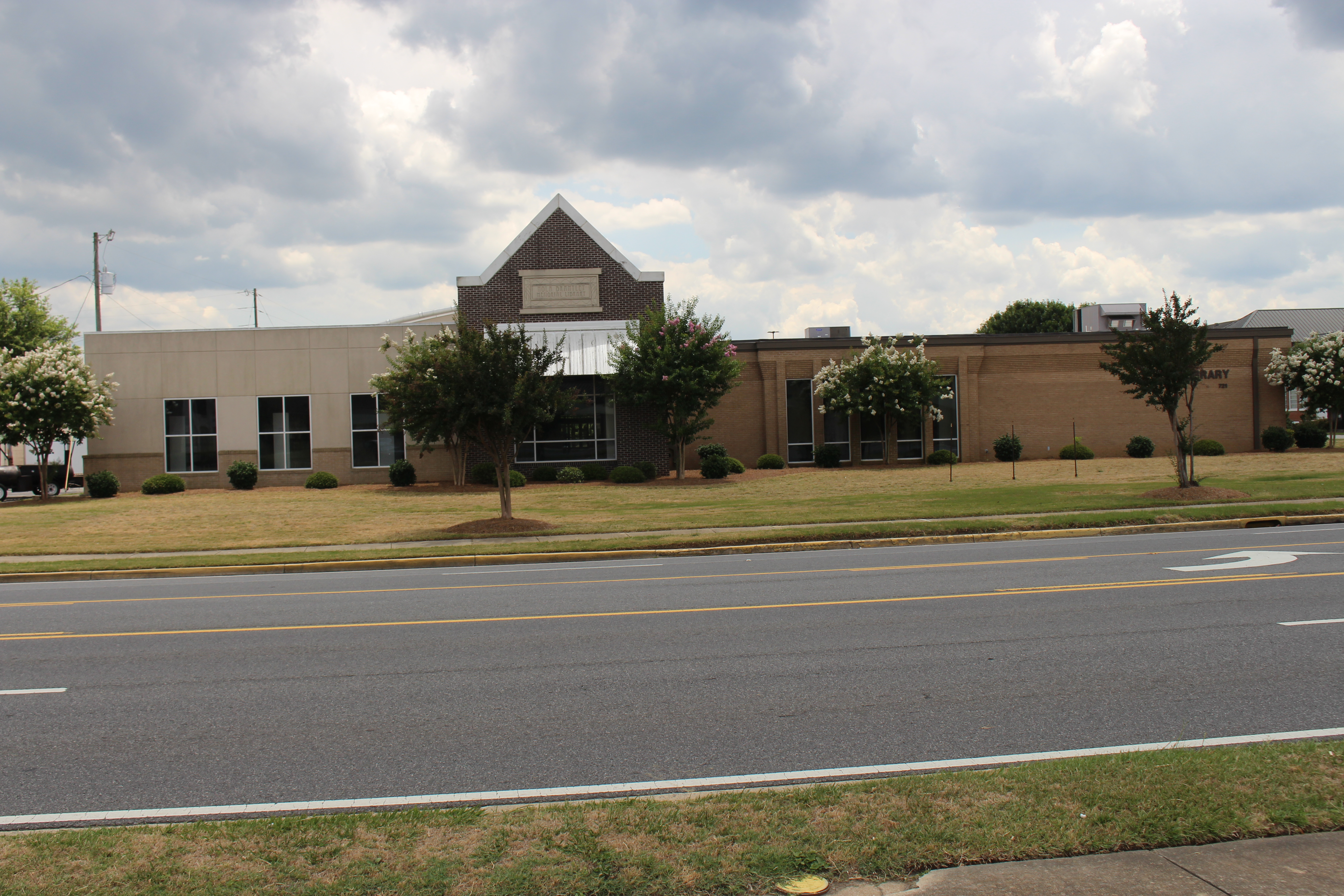
Nola Brantley Memorial Library

The Nola Brantley Memorial Library is the largest of the three branches in the system, at 23,000 square feet. It was originally formed as the Warner Robins Library in 1948 by private donations, and became part of the City of Warner Robins government in 1953. The current building was built in 1976.

In 1980, the library board voted to change the library's name to the Nola Brantley Memorial Library. Prior to coming to Warner Robins, Brantley, a Laurens County native, taught in Laurens, Bleckley, Webster and Meriwether counties. She was the chair of the first committee to explore library services in Warner Robins in 1948. She was the principal of the Charles E. Thomas II school (formerly the Warner Robins Elementary School) in Warner Robins from 1944 until 1969. She had worked in the field of education for 46 years.

The library received an 8,000 square foot addition in 2001. In 2013 the library received a $1.9 million renovation that considerably updated the facility and added "an expanded local history room, teen area, more than 84,500 items for checkout, 32 public computers and an additional 5,000 square feet of library space."

== Centerville Public Library Branch ==
The Centerville Public Library Branch is the newest branch, at 16,000 square feet. This is the busiest of the three locations, and began in 1964 with private donations. It was formerly housed in a shopping center and Centerville City Hall. The current location was built in 2010.

== Perry Public Library Branch ==
The Perry Public Library Branch started in 1879 when the Perry Public Library and the Perry Reading Club were formed with donated books. In 1939, the WPA, with the Perry Kiwanis Club as a sponsor, formed a public library which was housed in the basement of the county courthouse. In 1972, the library had a new building with 23,000 books, 40 magazines, 4000 regular members and a circulation of 5000 books a month. In 2015, a major renovation and expansion increased the overall size to 14,152 square feet.

== Branches ==
Name	Address	Phone
Centerville Public Library Branch	206 Gunn Road, Centerville, GA 31028	478.953.4500
Nola Brantley Memorial Library Branch	721 Watson Blvd, Warner Robins, GA 31093	478.923.0128
Perry Public Library Branch	1201 Washington Street, Perry, GA 31069	478.987.3050

== Library systems in neighboring counties ==
- Middle Georgia Regional Library System to the north
- Ocmulgee Regional Library System to the south east
- Lake Blackshear Regional Library System to the southwest
- Peach Public Libraries to the west
