= Carnegie Library of Valdosta =

- U.S. National Register of Historic Places
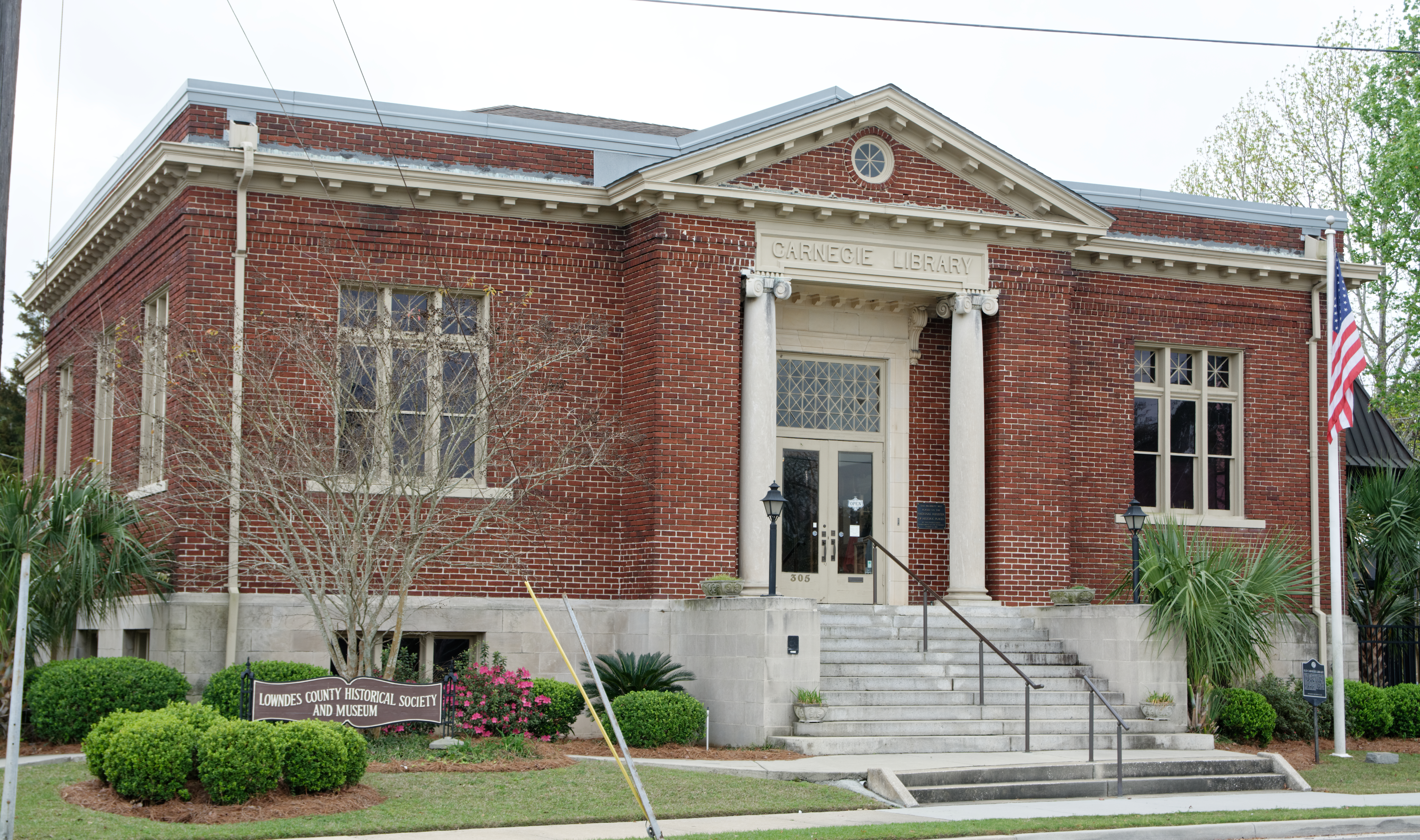

- Location within Georgia Location within the United States
- Location: 305 W. Central Ave., Valdosta, Georgia
- Coordinates: 30°49′50″N 83°16′58″W
- Area: 0.4 acres (0.16 ha)
- Built: 1913
- Built by: Little & Phillips
- Architect: Lloyd Greer
- Architectural style: Classical Revival
- NRHP reference No.: 84001120
- Added to NRHP: January 12, 1984

The Carnegie Library of Valdosta is a Carnegie library building in Valdosta, Georgia. It was constructed in 1913 for $40,000, with help from a $15,000 Carnegie grant. It was the first building designed by local architect Lloyd V. Greer. It opened in 1914. Decades later it became a branch library and then the base for the Lowndes County Historical Society. It was added to the National Register of Historic Places on January 12, 1984. It is located at 305 West Central Avenue. Originally part of the South Georgia Regional Library, the library building is now home to the Lowndes County Historical Society and Museum.

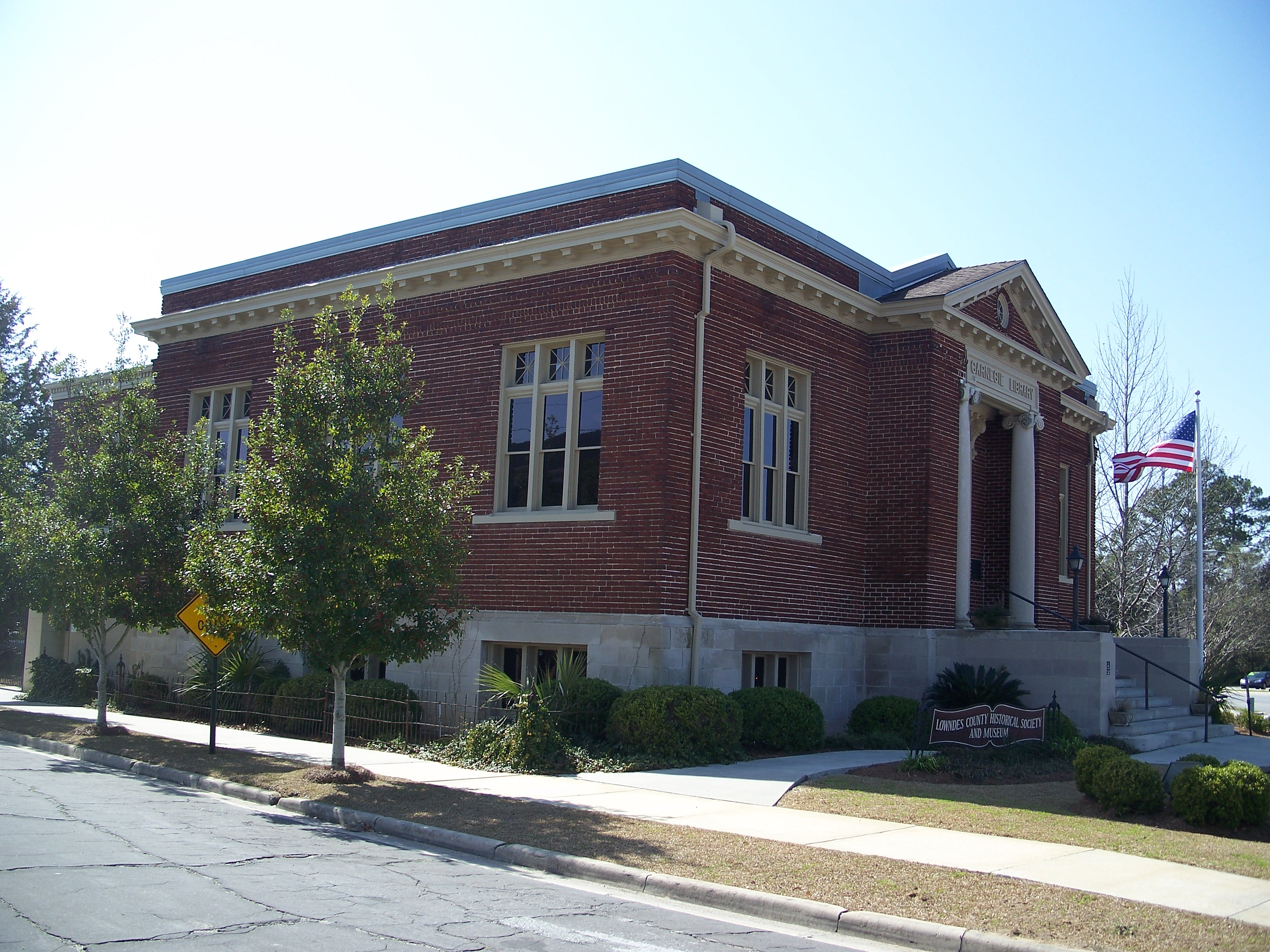
Carnegie Library of Valdosta

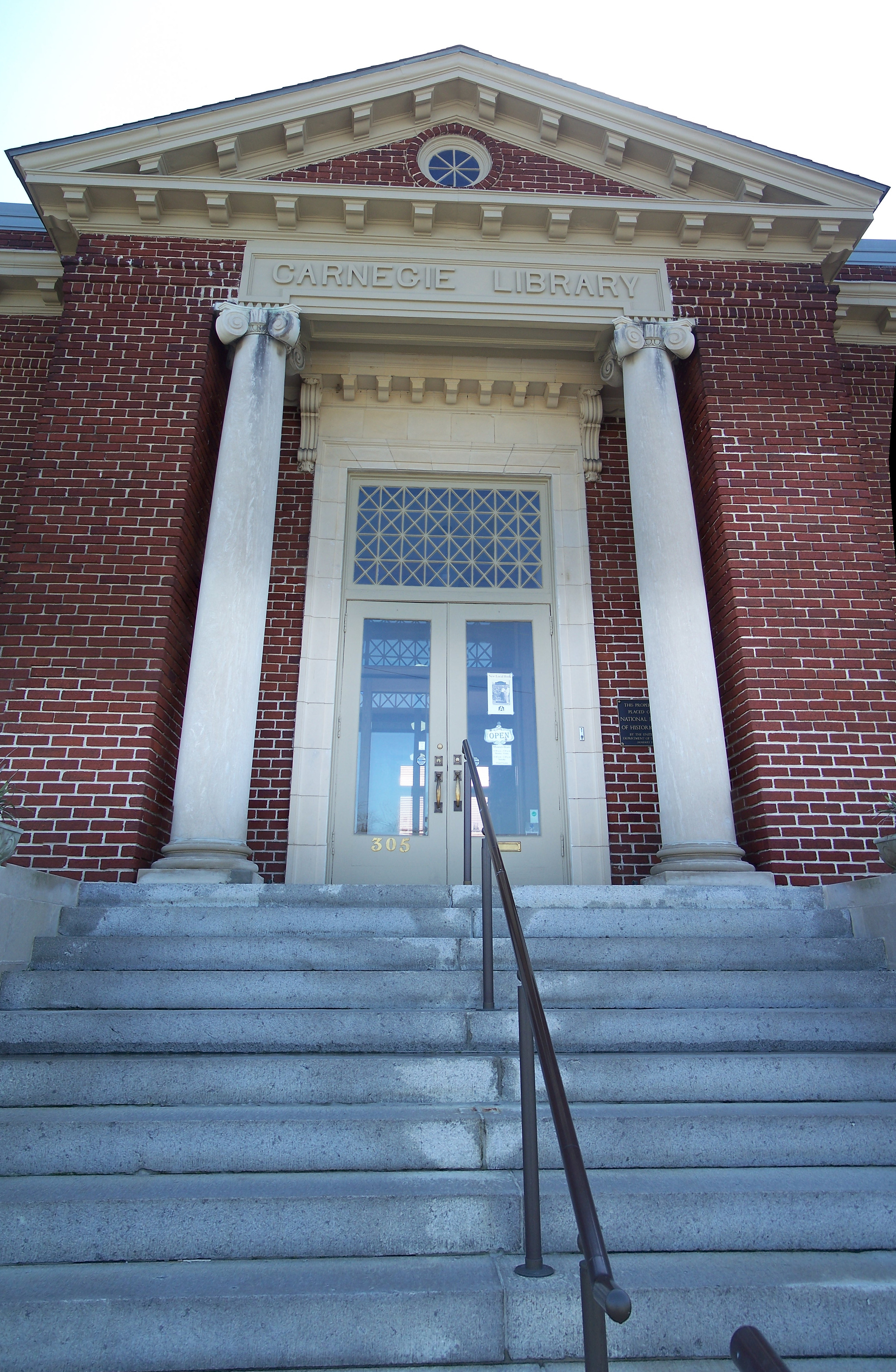
Carnegie Library of Valdosta

== See also ==
- National Register of Historic Places listings in Lowndes County, Georgia
