= Coastal Plain Regional Library System =

Public library system in Georgia, U.S.

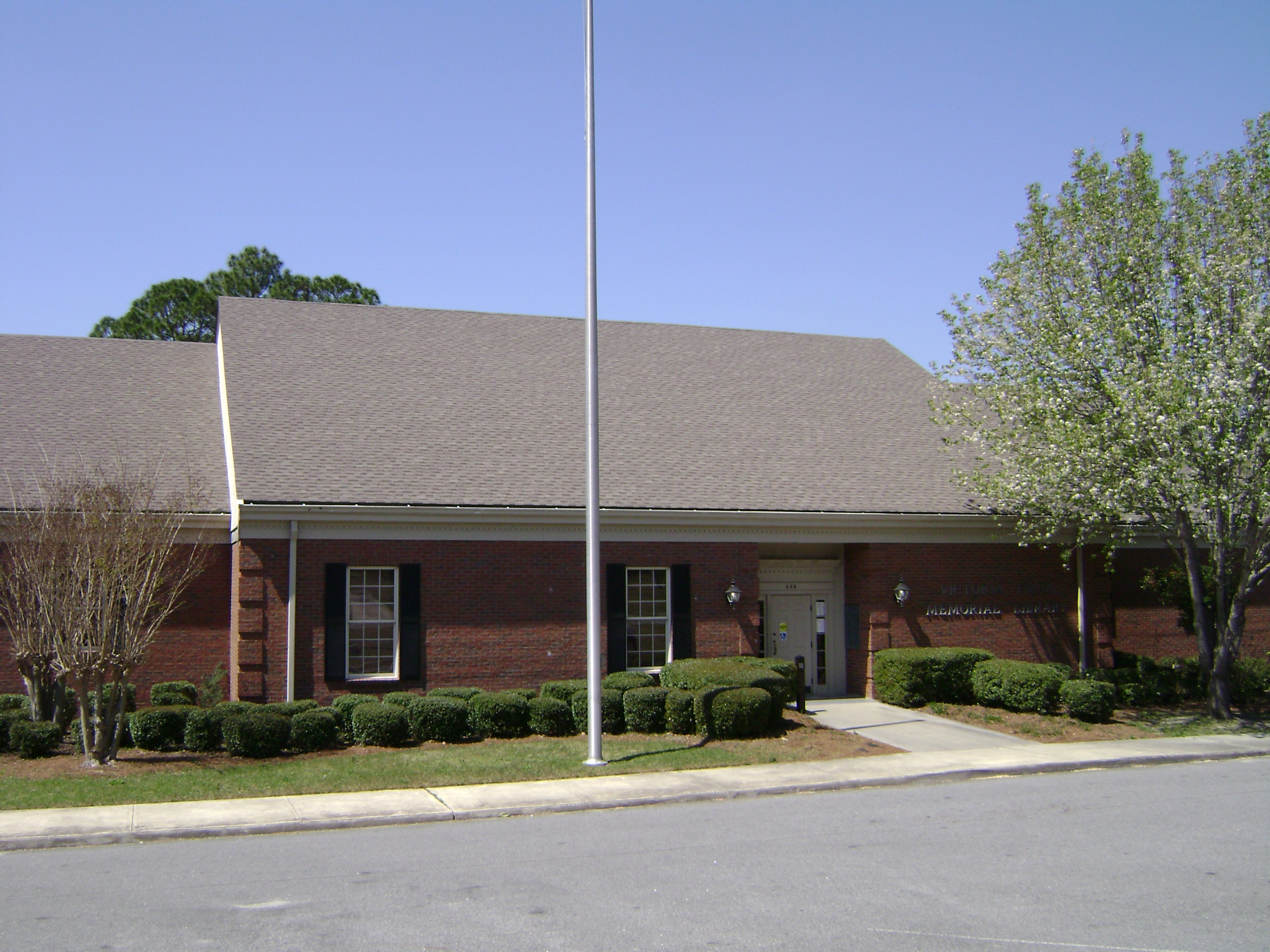
- The Victoria Evans Memorial Library
- Location: South Georgia, US
- Established: 1956
- Branches: 6

Collection
- Size: 270,675 (2016)

Access and use
- Circulation: 306,724 (2016)
- Population served: 94,976 (2016)
- Members: 33,245 (2016)

Other information
- Director: Kathy Griffis
- Website: http://www.cprl.org/

The Coastal Plain Regional Library System (CPRL) is a public library system serving the counties of Ben Hill, Berrien, Cook, Irwin, Tift, and Turner in the U.S. state of Georgia. The Coastal Plains Headquarters Library is located in Tifton.

CRPL is a member of PINES, a program of the Georgia Public Library Service that covers 53 library systems in 143 counties of Georgia. Any resident in a PINES supported library system has access to the system's collection of 10.6 million books. The library is also serviced by GALILEO, a program of the University System of Georgia which stands for "GeorgiA LIbrary LEarning Online". This program offers residents in supported libraries access to over 100 databases indexing thousands of periodicals and scholarly journals. It also boasts over 10,000 journal titles in full text.

== History ==
The Coastal Plain Regional Library System originated during a time in Georgia history were the state began providing increased funds for libraries if they were a part of a greater regional system. As many of the county libraries in what is today the Coastal Plain Region were small and short on books, Tift County approached Berrien, Irwin, Turner, and Cook counties to see if an agreement could be made to combine their services into one larger system. Effective September 1, 1956 the system was born, and had the distinction of being the largest regional library system at the time.

In 2018, the Fitzgerald-Ben Hill County Library joined the system.

=== Tift County ===
On February 3, 1905, nine women of the Twentieth Century Club met together to organize a public library in Tifton. The library was originally small; it was subscription-based, with a maximum of 25 patrons paying $1.00 per year to borrow books from the small collection. Within a few years, interest in the library grew and there was a greater demand to be included on the list of subscribers. Noticing this, the women began to move their collection into larger spaces, and at the same time included more patrons. For many years the collection moved across Tifton before settling in a remodeled home with ample room for the stacks as well as an auditorium for public functions and small club rooms.

By 1930, Tift County and the city of Tifton took a larger role in providing the public access to the free library. The subscription-based system was replaced with public funds from the city and county. Contributions were used in the upkeep and maintenance of the building and collection. With funding now increased for the library, monies were put away for use in an eventual move to a larger facility. In 1966, again cramped for space, the library used this money to renovate the old town post office into a new library. This building received another renovation in 1981 with the addition of a large room and expanded space for services.

== Branches ==
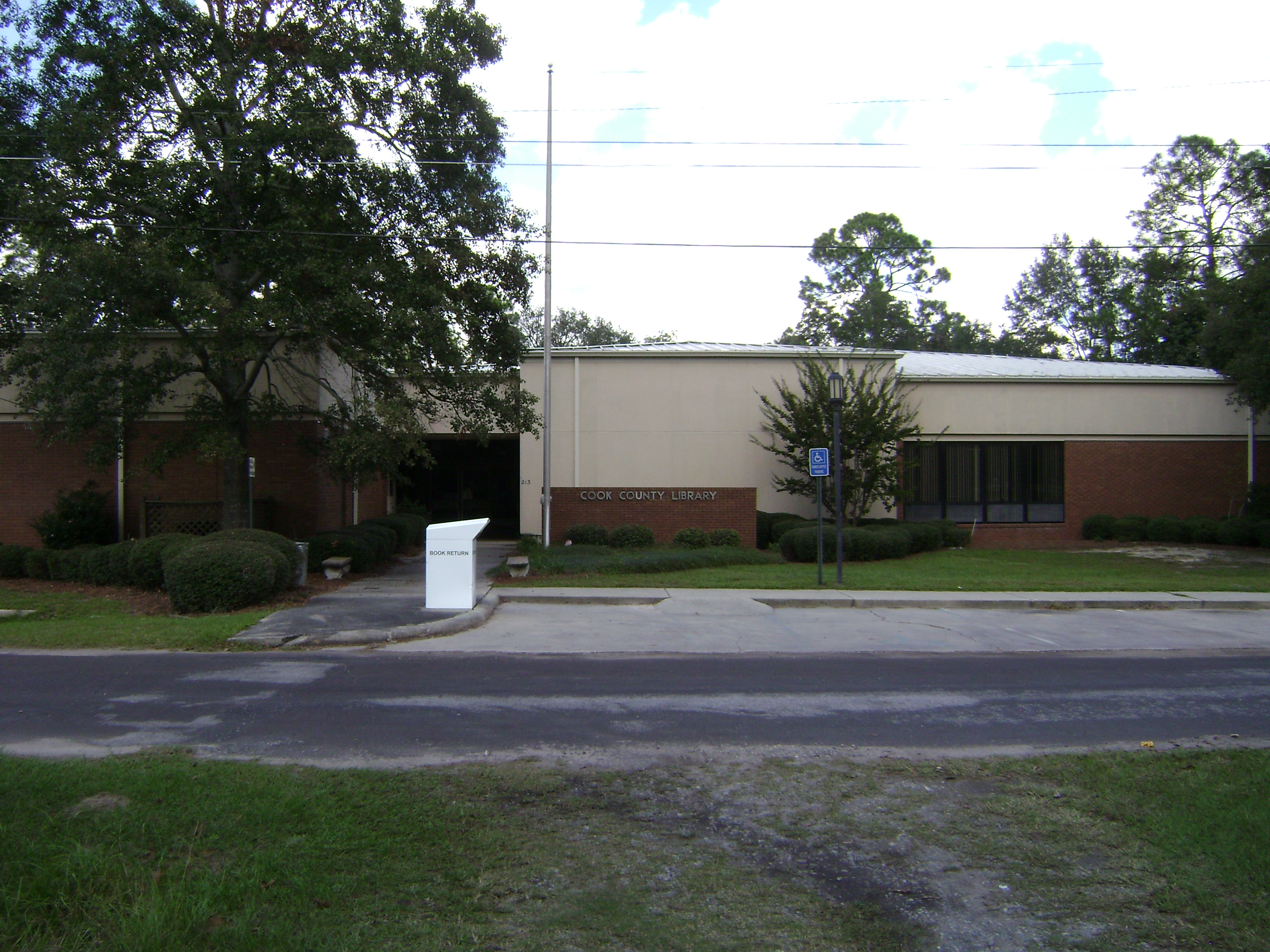
Cook County Library

Name	Address
Carrie Dorsey Perry Memorial Library	315 West Marion Avenue, Nashville, GA 31639
Coastal Plain Headquarters Library	2014 Chestnut Avenue, Tifton, GA 31794
Cook County Library	213 East Second Street, Adel, GA 31620
Fitzgerald-Ben Hill County Library	123 North Main Street, Fitzgerald, GA 31750
Irwin County Library	310 South Beech Street, Ocilla, GA 31774
Tifton-Tift County Public Library	245 Love Avenue, Tifton, GA 31794
Victoria Evans Memorial Library	605 North Street, Ashburn, GA 31714

== Library systems in neighboring counties ==
- Lake Blackshear Regional Library System to the northwest
- Ocmulgee Regional Library System to the north
- Satilla Regional Library System to the east
- South Georgia Regional Library to the south
- Brooks County Public Library to the south
- Moultrie-Colquitt County Library System to the southwest
- Worth County Library System to the west
