= Peach Public Libraries =

- 32°33′3.96″N 83°53′0.89″W
- Location: Peach County, Georgia, United States

Collection
- Size: 98,369 (2016)

Access and use
- Circulation: 48,073 (2016)
- Population served: 27,313 (2016)
- Members: 8,209 (2016)

Other information
- Director: Billy Tripp
- Website: http://www.peach.public.lib.ga.us/

The Peach Public Libraries is a consortium of two public libraries in central Georgia, serving Peach County. Its headquarters is the Thomas Public Library in Fort Valley.

PPL is a member of PINES, a program of the Georgia Public Library Service covering 53 library systems in 143 counties; all residents in PINES-supported library systems have access to its combined collection of approximately 10.6 million books. PPL is serviced by GALILEO (GeorgiA LIbrary LEarning Online), a program of the University System of Georgia that offers access to over 100 databases indexing thousands of periodicals and scholarly journals. It also maintains over 10,000 journal titles in full text.

== History ==
The first library in Peach County opened in 1878 in Fort Valley, and "housed 2500 volumes of choice and well-selected reading matter. Eight first-class daily papers, numerous weeklies and several standard magazines." While impressive for its time, no other information about this initial library exists today.

The central branch today, the Thomas Public Library, was founded on September 15, 1915 at a members' meeting called by the president of the History Club. By the end of the meeting the Fort Valley Library Association was formed from a donation by Dr. and Mrs. E. G. Thomas, who at the time were lending their 500-volume collection to local friends and patients. The Library Association sought to rent the Evans building in town to store the books, and by September 23 had moved to it. The library was initially funded by monthly $1 donations by 17 local citizens, and by a $25 monthly donation from the local Presbyterian church.

By 1920, the library was growing at a faster pace than the Association could manage. To lighten the load, a board of trustees was created in the mid-1920s and a Library Auxiliary formed by women library members. By the mid-1930s, when the collection had grown to over 7,000 volumes, the library moved to the recently constructed courthouse to obtain adequate space.

In 1936, with help from the Works Progress Administration (WPA), the town of Byron, Georgia opened its own branch under the supervision of the Thomas Public Library. When the WPA ended, the Byron library joined the Thomas Public Library to create the first iteration of the Peach Public Library system.

A third library on South Macon joined in 1961, but it was severely damaged by fire in 1969. To fund its replacement, the townspeople raised $37,000; the county governance provided $80,000; the city government provided $35,000; and Governor Lester Maddox donated $25,000 and a site for the new building. On April 16, 1972 the new Thomas Library was formally dedicated by the county. Today it serves a population of over 27,000 people in Peach County.

== Branches ==
The library system has two branches:

- The Thomas Public Library, 315 Martin Luther King Jr. Drive, Fort Valley (central branch)
- The Byron Public Library, 105 Church Street, Byron

== Libraries in neighboring counties ==
- Middle Georgia Regional Library System to the north
- Houston County Public Library System to the east
- Pine Mountain Regional Library System to the west
