= Ocmulgee Regional Library System =

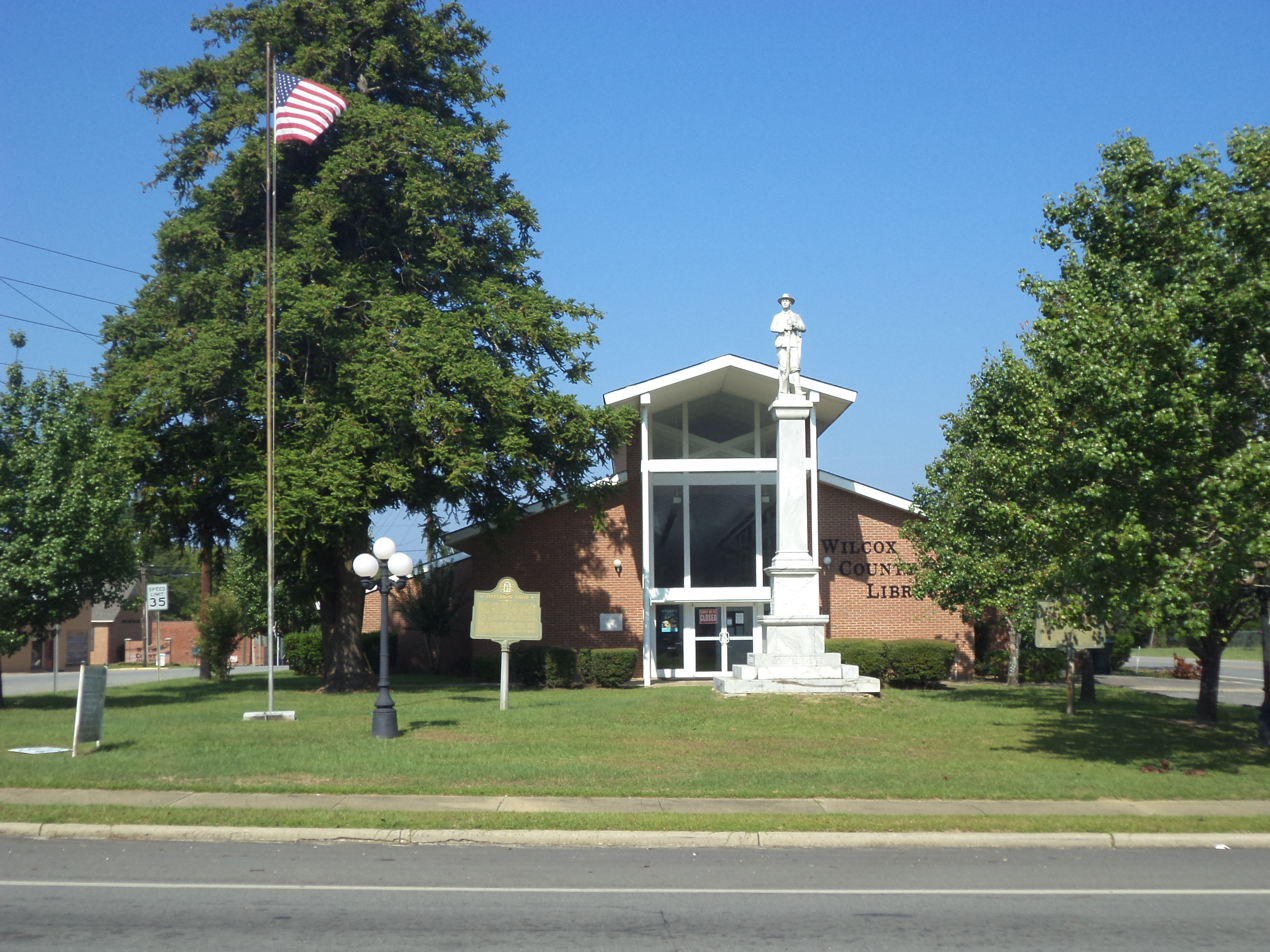
- The Wilcox County Library
- Location: South-Central Georgia
- Branches: 6

Collection
- Size: 132,278 (2016)

Access and use
- Circulation: 90,627 (2016)
- Population served: 79,032 (2016)
- Members: 16,786 (2016)

Other information
- Director: Kim Spencer
- Website: http://orls.org/

The Ocmulgee Regional Library System (ORLS) is a public library system in the U.S. state of Georgia serving Dodge, Bleckley, Pulaski, Telfair, Wheeler, Wilcox counties. The headquarters of the system is the Murrell Memorial Library, which is located in Eastman, Georgia|Eastman.

ORLS is a member of PINES, a program of the Georgia Public Library Service that covers 53 library systems in 143 counties of Georgia. Any resident in a PINES supported library system has access to the system's collection of 10.6 million books. The library is also serviced by GALILEO, a program of the University System of Georgia which stands for "GeorgiA LIbrary LEarning Online". This program offers residents in supported libraries access to over 100 databases indexing thousands of periodicals and scholarly journals. It also boasts over 10,000 journal titles in full text.

== History ==
The oldest branch created in the current Ocmulgee Regional Library System area was the M. E. Roden Library in Pulaski County. This library began in 1878 when "a petition for the charter for the incorporation of our Public Library and Literacy Society was signed by prominent citizens" and was run until 1897 closing due to inactivity. By 1910 the Uplift Club in Pulaski organized a new library and the Works Progress Administration aided in its growth in the 1930s.

In 1936 the WPA also helped begin libraries in Bleckley and Wilcox County. The Wilcox Library was operated out of several different county buildings before moving to the county courthouse in 1983 after renovations made a library space possible. In 1986 the Bleckley County Library moved to downtown Cochran into a new dedicated building and was named the Tessie W. Norris Library.

In 1940 with sponsorship from the local P.T.A. the Telfair County Library was established with 200 books borrowed from the Georgia Library Commission. By 1943 a library board was created to relieve the P.T.A. of their sponsorship. The first home for the library was the McRae-Helena School, which was later moved to a log cabin near the courthouse. On May 15, 1955 Telfair and Dodge counties decided to combine their resources and formed the Dodge-Telfair Regional Library. When Bleckley County joined in the 1960s the name was changed to the Ocmulgee Regional Library System. The Telfair library moved to the Civic Memorial Center in 1976 and shortly thereafter was granted full ownership of the property for library use.

The most recent library to join the system is the Wheeler County Library in July 2000. By 2004 the county constructed a new facility for the collection, opening a new history and genealogy room for residents of the library system.

== Branches ==
Name	Address
M. E. Roden Memorial Library	400 Commerce Street, Hawkinsville, GA 31036
Murrell Memorial Library	531 Second Avenue, Eastman, GA 31023
Telfair County Library	101 West College Street, McRae, GA 31055
Tessie W. Norris/Cochran-Bleckley County Library	315 Third Street, Cochran, GA 31014
Wheeler County Library	61 West Main Street, Alamo, GA 30411
Wilcox County Library	104 North Broad, Abbeville, GA 31004

== Library systems in neighboring counties ==
- Middle Georgia Regional Library System to the north
- Oconee Regional Library System to the north
- Ohoopee Regional Library System to the east
- Satilla Regional Library System to the southeast
- Coastal Plain Regional Library System to the southwest
- Lake Blackshear Regional Library System to the west
- Houston County Public Library System to the northwest
