= Satilla Regional Library System =

Public library system in Georgia, United States

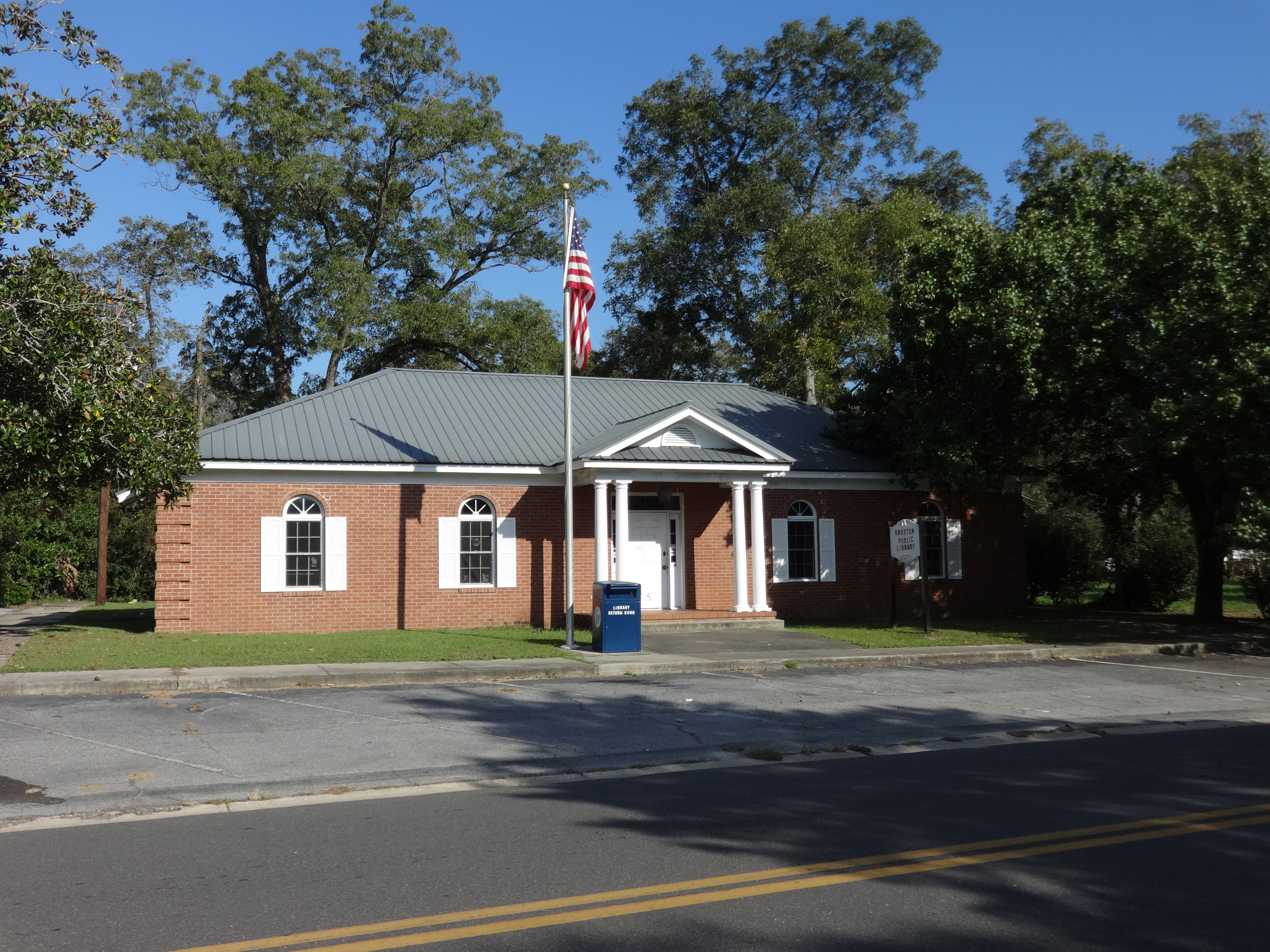
- Broxton Public Library
- Location: Southeast Georgia
- Established: 1950s
- Branches: 6

Collection
- Size: 93,765 (2016)

Access and use
- Circulation: 55,089 (2016)
- Population served: 52,615(2016)
- Members: 12,767(2016)

Other information
- Director: Rodney McElveen
- Website: http://www.srlsys.org/

The Satilla Regional Library System is a public library system serving Atkinson County and Coffee County, Georgia. The headquarters of the system is the Douglas-Coffee County Public Library, located in Douglas, Georgia.

The library system is a member of PINES, a program of the Georgia Public Library Service that covers 53 library systems in 143 counties of Georgia. Any resident in a PINES supported library system has access to the system's collection of 10.6 million books. The library is also serviced by GALILEO, a program of the University System of Georgia, which stands for "Georgia Library Learning Online." This program offers residents of supported libraries access to over 100 databases indexing thousands of periodicals and scholarly journals. It also boasts over 10,000 journal titles in full text.

== Branches ==
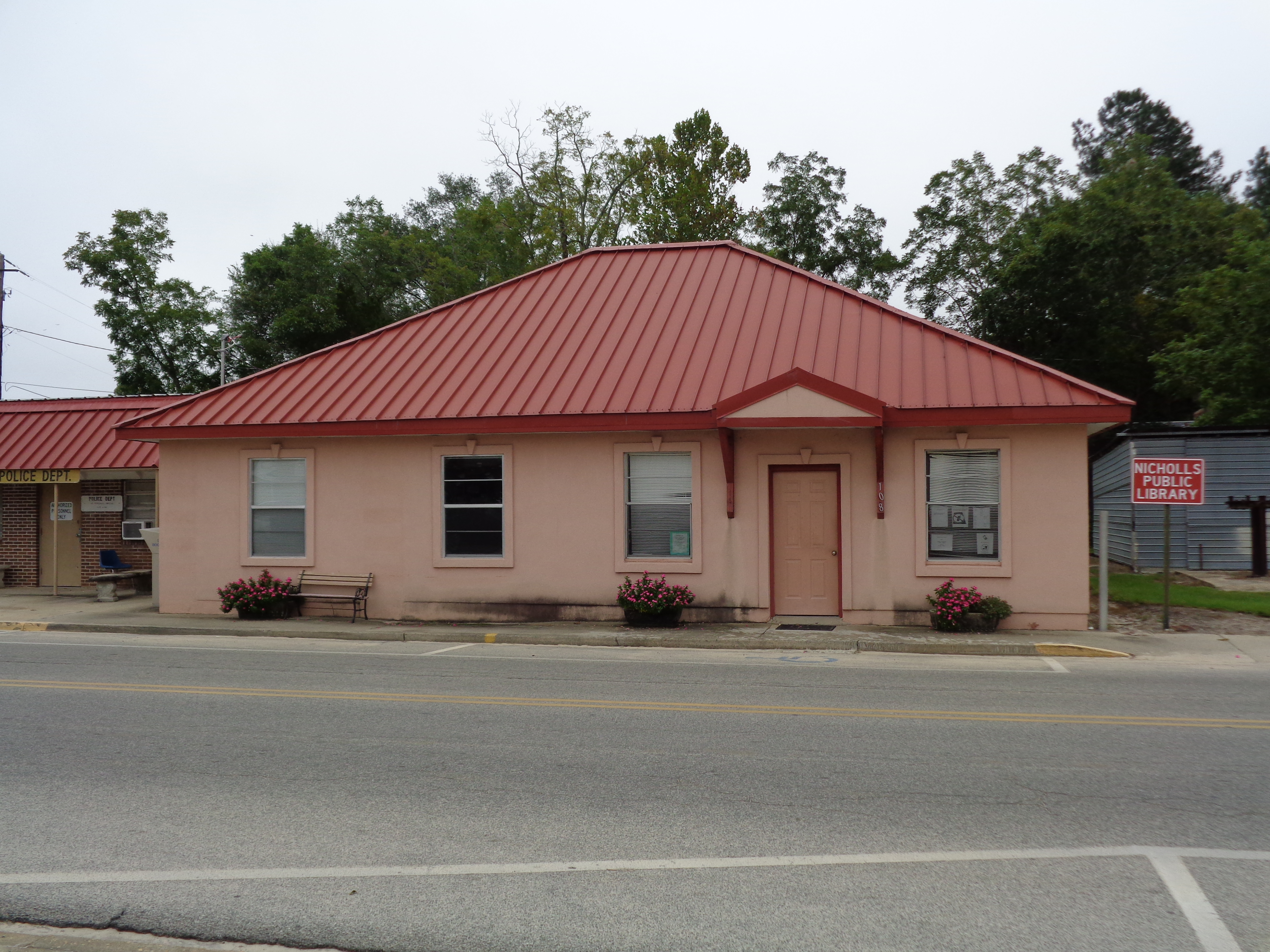
Nicholls Public Library

Name	Address
Pearson Public Library	202 E. Bullard Avenue, Pearson, GA 31642
Willacoochee Public Library	165 E. Fleetwood Avenue, Willacoochee, GA 31650
Ambrose Public Library	1070 Cypress Street, Ambrose, GA 31512
Broxton Public Library	105 Church Street, Broxton, GA 31519
Douglas-Coffee County Public Library	200 S. Madison Avenue, Suite D, Douglas, GA 31533
Nicholls Public Library	108 N. Liberty Street, Nicholls, GA 31554

== Library systems in neighboring counties ==
- Ocmulgee Regional Library System to the north.
- Ohoopee Regional Library System to the north east.
- Okefenokee Regional Library System to the east.
- South Georgia Regional Library to the south.
- Coastal Plain Regional Library System to the west.
