= Georgia State Route 62 =

State highway in Georgia

State Route 62
- Georgia State Route 62 highlighted in red

Route information
- Maintained by Georgia Department of Transportation
- Length: 62.19 mi (100.09 km)

Major junctions
- West end: SR 52 at the Alabama state line in Columbia, AL
- US 27 Bus. / SR 1 Bus. / SR 39 in Blakely; US 27 / SR 1 in Blakely
- East end: SR 234 in Albany

Location
- Country: United States
- State: Georgia
- Counties: Early, Calhoun, Dougherty

Highway system
- Georgia State Highway System; Interstate; US; State; Special
← SR 61	→ SR 63

State Route 62 (SR 62) is a 62.19-mile-long (100.09 km) state highway in the southwestern part of the U.S. state of Georgia. It connects Columbia, Alabama with Albany.

== Route description ==
SR 62 begins at the Alabama state line, where the highway continues as Alabama State Route 52 into Columbia. SR 62 travels in a northeasterly direction, through rural areas of Early County, toward Blakely. About 2 miles (3.2 km) after starting, it intersects the northern terminus of SR 370 near Hilton. Just after entering Blakely, SR 62 has an intersection with SR 62 Bypass before going to downtown Blakely. While in downtown, it has an intersection with US 27 Business/SR 1 Business/SR 39 (South Main Street). The four routes head concurrent around the city square. A little farther to the east is the western terminus of SR 200 (Damascus Road). Then, SR 62 intersects US 27/SR 1. It continues to the northeast and has a second intersection with SR 62 Bypass. Just before leaving Blakely, it passes the Early County Airport. It heads east and east-northeast through rural portions of the county. Just before it leaves the county, it enters Arlington. In town, it begins a concurrency with SR 45/SR 216 (Highland Avenue South) and heads north into Calhoun County. Once in the Calhoun County portion of town, SR 62 departs its concurrency with SR 45/SR 216 (Highland Avenue North). The route continues in an east-northeast direction through rural portions of Calhoun County, and enters the town of Leary. In Leary, the route has an intersection with SR 37 (Depot Street). This intersection also marks the southern terminus of SR 55 (Mercer Avenue). SR 37/SR 62 have a very brief concurrency before SR 62 departs to the east. A short distance later, it crosses over Chickasawhatchee Creek into Dougherty County, going through the town of Pretoria, before reaching SR 91. The two highways head concurrent to the northeast and enter Albany. In Albany, they pass the Southwest Georgia Regional Airport. Just past the airport, SR 62 splits off to the north for a brief distance before reaching its eastern terminus, an intersection with SR 234.

The entire length of SR 1 is part of the National Highway System, a system of routes determined to be the most important for the nation's economy, mobility, and defense.

== Major intersections ==
County	Location	mi	km	Destinations	Notes
Early		0.000	0.000	SR 52 west – Columbia, Dothan	Western terminus at the Alabama state line (Chattahoochee River bridge)
Early	Hilton	1.947	3.133	SR 370 south (Great Southern Highway) – Saffold, GP	Northern terminus of SR 370
Early	Blakely	11.105	17.872	SR 62 Byp. east (Martin Luther King Jr. Boulevard) – Fort Gaines, Cuthbert, Arlington, Kolomoki Mounds State Park	Western terminus of SR 62 Byp.
Early	Blakely	12.585	20.254	US 27 Bus. south / SR 1 Bus. south / SR 39 south (South Main Street) – Colquitt, Donalsonville	Western end of US 27 Bus./SR 1 Bus./SR 39 concurrency
Early	Blakely	12.771	20.553	US 27 Bus. north / SR 1 Bus. north / SR 39 north – Cuthbert, Fort Gaines	Traffic circle around Early County Courthouse; eastern end of US 27 Bus./SR 1 Bus./SR 39 concurrency
Early	Blakely	13.236	21.301	SR 200 east (Damascus Road) – Damascus, Newton	Western terminus of SR 200
Early	Blakely	13.542	21.794	US 27 / SR 1 to SR 39 north – Bluffton, Colquitt, Kolomoki Mounds State Park	
Early	Blakely	14.670	23.609	SR 62 Byp. west (Martin Luther King Jr. Boulevard) to US 27 – Fort Gaines, Cuthbert, Dothan, AL	Eastern terminus of SR 62 Byp.
Early	Arlington	26.554	42.735	SR 45 south / SR 216 south (Highland Avenue) – Newton, Colquitt	Western end of SR 45/SR 216 concurrency
Calhoun	Arlington	27.179	43.740	SR 45 Alt. north / SR 45 Truck north / SR 62 Truck east / SR 216 Truck north (Cedar Street)	Southern terminus of SR 45 Alt./SR 45 Truck/SR 216 Truck; western terminus of SR 62 Truck
Calhoun	Arlington	27.263	43.876	SR 45 north / SR 216 north (SR 216 Truck / Highland Avenue) – Edison, Cuthbert, Morgan, Edison	Eastern end of SR 45/SR 216 concurrency; western end of SR 216 Truck concurrency
Calhoun	Arlington	27.360	44.032	SR 45 Alt. / SR 45 Truck / SR 62 Truck west / SR 216 Truck south (Mayhaw Avenue)	Eastern end of SR 216 Truck concurrency; eastern terminus of SR 62 Truck
Calhoun	Leary	40.175	64.655	SR 37 west (North Depot Street) / SR 55 north (Mercer Avenue) – Dawson, Morgan	Western end of SR 37 concurrency; southern terminus of SR 55
Calhoun	Leary	40.375	64.977	SR 37 east (South Depot Street) – Newton	Eastern end of SR 37 concurrency
Dougherty		58.438	94.047	SR 91 south (Newton Road) – Newton	Western end of SR 91 concurrency
Dougherty	Albany	62.019	99.810	SR 91 north (Newton Road) – Downtown Albany	Eastern end of SR 91 concurrency
Dougherty	Albany	62.187	100.080	SR 234 (West Oakridge Drive / South Slappey Boulevard) – Albany, Dawson	Eastern terminus
1.000 mi = 1.609 km; 1.000 km = 0.621 mi: Concurrency terminus

== Special routes ==
=== Blakely bypass route ===
State Route 62 Bypass
- Location: Blakely
- Length: 4.5 mi (7.2 km)

State Route 62 Bypass (SR 62 Byp.) is a 4.5-mile-long (7.2 km) bypass route that exists entirely within the northern part of the town of Blakely.

It begins at an intersection with the SR 62 mainline (Columbia Road) in the western part of town. It heads north and curves to the east, to an intersection with SR 39. The two routes head concurrent to the east. At an intersection with US 27 Business/SR 1 Business (North Main Street), SR 39 departs the concurrency to the south, while SR 62 Bypass continues to the east. A little farther, it intersects US 27/SR 1. The highway heads northeast and curves to the southeast, until it meets is eastern terminus, a second intersection with the SR 62 mainline in the eastern part of town.

The entire length of SR 62 Byp. is part of the National Highway System, a system of routes determined to be the most important for the nation's economy, mobility, and defense.

The entire route is in Blakely, Early County.

mi	km	Destinations	Notes
0.0	0.0	SR 62 (Columbia Highway) – Columbia	Western terminus
2.2	3.5	SR 39 north – Fort Gaines	Western end of SR 39 concurrency
2.8	4.5	US 27 Bus. / SR 1 Bus. / SR 39 south (North Main Street)	Eastern end of SR 39 concurrency
3.3	5.3	US 27 / SR 1	
4.5	7.2	SR 62 (Arlington Highway) – Arlington	Eastern terminus
1.000 mi = 1.609 km; 1.000 km = 0.621 mi: Concurrency terminus

=== Arlington truck route ===
State Route 62 Truck
- Location: Arlington
- Length: 0.2 mi (320 m)

State Route 62 Truck (SR 62 Truck) is a 0.2-mile-long (0.32 km) truck route of SR 62 that exists in the southwestern part of Calhoun County. Its entire length is within the city limits of Arlington. It is entirely concurrent with SR 45 Alt., SR 45 Truck, and SR 216 Truck. It is also signed as the Charlie and Mary Cowart Bypass.

SR 45 Alt. and the three truck routes begin at an intersection with SR 45/SR 62/SR 216 (Highland Avenue) in the central part of Arlington. They travel to the east-northeast on Cedar Street for two blocks. At Mayhaw Avenue, they turn left and travel north-northwest for one block. At an intersection with SR 62 (Pioneer Road), SR 62 Truck ends, SR 216 Truck turns left onto SR 62, and SR 45 Alt. and SR 45 Truck continue along Mayhaw Avenue.

The entire route is in Arlington, Calhoun County.

mi	km	Destinations	Notes
0.0	0.0	SR 45 / SR 62 / SR 216 (Highland Avenue) / SR 45 Alt. begins / SR 45 Truck begins / SR 216 Truck begins / Cedar Street west – Blakely, Colquitt	Western end of SR 45 Alt./SR 45 Truck/SR 216 Truck concurrency; southern terminus of SR 45 Alt., SR 45 Truck, and SR 216 Truck; western terminus of SR 62 Truck
0.2	0.32	SR 45 Alt. north / SR 45 Truck north (Mayhaw Avenue) / SR 62 / SR 216 Truck north (Pioneer Road) – Morgan, Leary	Eastern end of SR 45 Alt./SR 45 Truck/SR 216 Truck concurrency; eastern terminus
1.000 mi = 1.609 km; 1.000 km = 0.621 mi: Concurrency terminus
