= Georgia State Route 45 =

State highway in Georgia, United States

State Route 45
- SR 45 highlighted in red

Route information
- Maintained by GDOT
- Length: 88.1 mi (141.8 km)

Major junctions
- South end: US 84 / SR 38 in Iron City
- US 27 / SR 1 / SR 91 in Colquitt; US 82 / SR 50 west of Dawson; US 82 / SR 32 / SR 520 in Dawson
- North end: US 280 / SR 27 in Plains

Location
- Country: United States
- State: Georgia
- Counties: Seminole, Miller, Early, Calhoun, Terrell, Webster, Sumter

Highway system
- Georgia State Highway System; Interstate; US; State; Special
← SR 44	→ SR 46

State Route 45 (SR 45) is a 88.1-mile-long (141.8 km) state highway that runs south-to-north through portions of Seminole, Miller, Early, Calhoun, Terrell, Webster, and Sumter counties in the southwestern part of the U.S. state of Georgia. The route connects Iron City and Plains, via Colquitt and Dawson.

== Route description ==
SR 45 begins at an intersection with US 84/SR 38 (Dunham Street) in Iron City, in Seminole County. It passes through rural areas of the county and crosses into Miller County. It enters Colquitt, passing Pleasant Hill Cemetery and curving to the northwest. The highway intersects SR 91, which begins a concurrency through town, and the two turn to the northeast. Less than 1,000 feet (300 m) later, they intersect US 27/SR 1, which join the concurrency. The four highways head east, crossing over Spring Creek into the main part of town. They pass by the Colquitt City Cemetery. Then, SR 45/SR 91 split off onto West College Street. Just under 1,000 feet (300 m) later, they meet the northern terminus of SR 45 Connector (South 1st Street). At this intersection, SR 45/SR 91 turn to the north. One block later, SR 91 heads east on Main Street, while SR 45 continues to the north. Just before leaving town, it passes Miller County High School. SR 45 heads nearly due north and gradually curves to the north-northeast before entering Early County. The road curves to the northeast and then curves back to the north. It enters Damascus, where it has a very brief concurrency with SR 200. It heads nearly due-north and curves to the north-northwest and enters Arlington. It intersects SR 216 (Newton Road), which runs concurrent with SR 45 into the main part of town. Less than 2,000 feet (610 m) later, SR 62 (Blakely Road SW). At Maxwell Street, they cross into Calhoun County. At Cedar Street, they meet the southern terminus of SR 45 Alternate/SR 45 Truck. One block later, SR 62 departs to the east-northeast on Pioneer Road. Two blocks later, SR 45 and SR 216 diverge, with SR 216 turning left onto Morgan Road NW and SR 45 traveling to the northeast on Morgan Road NE. It passes through rural areas of the county and enters Morgan, where it has a very brief concurrency with SR 37. The highway heads north, curves to the northeast, and then to the east, crossing over Ichawaynochaway Creek. It intersects the western terminus of SR 234, at which point it turns north-northeast. A little distance later, it enters Terrell County on a fairly northern routing. It intersects US 82/SR 50 (Graves Highway), west of Dawson. At this intersection, SR 50 meets its eastern terminus, and US 82/SR 45 run concurrent into town. In town, they pass Dawson Country Club and cross over Brantley Creek, before intersecting SR 520. At this intersection, US 82 heads southeast, concurrent with SR 520 east, while SR 45 departs to the north, concurrent with SR 520 west. A few blocks later, they meet the western terminus of SR 32 (East Lee Street). The two routes leave town, and SR 45 heads north-northeast. It meets the southern terminus of SR 49. The highway continues in roughly a northern routing. Then it curves to the northwest, cutting across a small portion of Webster County, before curving back to the northeast and crossing over Kinchafoonee Creek. Immediately afterward, it enters Sumter County. SR 45 continues to the northeast and enters Plains. There, it meets the northern terminus of SR 308 (Bonds Trail Road). It heads north-northwest and meets its northern terminus, an intersection with US 280/SR 27 (Church Street). Prior to 1989, the road continued north out of Plains to GA 153.

The following portions of SR 45 are part of the National Highway System, a system of routes determined to be the most important for the nation's economy, mobility, and defense:

- The entire length of the US 27/SR 1 concurrency in Colquitt
- The entire length of the SR 62 concurrency in Arlington
- From the southern end of the US 82/SR 50 concurrency, west of Dawson, to the northern end of the SR 520 concurrency, north of the city

== Major intersections ==
County	Location	mi	km	Destinations	Notes
Seminole	Iron City	0.0	0.0	US 84 / SR 38 (Dunham Street)	Southern terminus
Miller	Colquitt	12.2	19.6	SR 91 south – Donalsonville	Southern end of SR 91 concurrency
Miller	Colquitt	12.3	19.8	US 27 north / SR 1 north	Southern end of US 27/SR 1 concurrency
Miller	Colquitt	13.5	21.7	US 27 south / SR 1 south (Crawford Street)	Northern end of US 27/SR 1 concurrency
Miller	Colquitt	13.7	22.0	SR 45 Conn. south (South 1st Street)	Northern terminus of SR 45 Connector
Miller	Colquitt	13.7	22.0	SR 91 north (Main Street) – Newton	Northern end of SR 91 concurrency
Early	Damascus	22.7	36.5	SR 200 east (Damascus Highway) – Newton	Southern end of SR 200 concurrency
Early	Damascus	22.9	36.9	SR 200 west (Haddock Street) – Blakely	Northern end of SR 200 concurrency
Early	Arlington	31.5	50.7	SR 216 north (Newton Road)	Southern end of SR 216 concurrency
Early	Arlington	31.9	51.3	SR 62 south (Blakely Road SW) – Blakely	Southern end of SR 62 concurrency
Calhoun	Arlington	32.5	52.3	SR 45 Alt. north / SR 45 Truck north / SR 62 Truck east / SR 216 Truck north (Cedar Street)	Southern terminus of SR 45 Alt./SR 45 Truck/SR 216 Truck; western terminus of SR 62 Truck
Calhoun	Arlington	32.6	52.5	SR 62 east (SR 216 Truck / Pioneer Road) – Leary	Northern end of SR 62 concurrency; northern terminus of SR 216 Truck
Calhoun	Arlington	32.7	52.6	SR 216 west (Morgan Road NW) – Edison	Northern end of SR 216 concurrency
Calhoun	Arlington	32.8	52.8	SR 45 Alt. south / SR 45 Truck south (Mayhaw Avenue NE)	Northern terminus of SR 45 Alt./SR 45 Truck
Calhoun	Morgan	43.9	70.7	SR 37 west (Dickey Street) – Edison	Southern end of SR 37 concurrency
Calhoun	Morgan	44.0	70.8	SR 37 east (Dickey Street) – Leary	Northern end of SR 37 concurrency
Calhoun		45.3	72.9	SR 41 north – Shellman	Southern terminus of SR 41
Calhoun		50.1	80.6	SR 234 east – Albany	Western terminus of SR 234
Terrell		63.6	102.4	US 82 west / SR 50 west (Graves Highway) – Cuthbert	Southern end of US 82/SR 50 concurrency
Terrell	Dawson	66.7	107.3	US 82 east / SR 520 east (Rountree Drive) / SR 50 ends / Graves Road east – Terrell Middle–High School	Northern end of US 82/SR 50 concurrency; southern end of SR 520 concurrency; eastern terminus of SR 50
Terrell	Dawson	66.9	107.7	SR 32 east (West Lee Street) – Leesburg	Western terminus of SR 32
Terrell		68.5	110.2	SR 520 west (Columbus Highway) – Richland	Northern end of SR 520 concurrency
Terrell		73.4	118.1	SR 49 north (Americus Highway) – Americus	Southern terminus of SR 49
Webster	No major junctions				
Sumter	Plains	87.8	141.3	SR 308 south (Bonds Trail Road) – Smithville	Northern terminus of SR 308
Sumter	Plains	88.1	141.8	US 280 / SR 27 (Church Street) – Richland, Americus	Northern terminus
1.000 mi = 1.609 km; 1.000 km = 0.621 mi: Concurrency terminus

== Special routes ==
=== Colquitt connector route ===
- Location: Colquitt
- Length: 0.1 mi (160 m)

State Route 45 Connector (SR 45 Connector) is a 0.1-mile-long (0.16 km) connector route that exists entirely within the central part of Miller County. Its route travels totally within the city limits of Colquitt and is known as South First Street for its entire length.

It begins at an intersection with US 27/SR 1 (Crawford Street). It curves to a nearly-due-north routing for one block and meets its northern terminus, an intersection with SR 45/SR 91 in the main part of town.

The entire route is in Colquitt, Miller County.

mi	km	Destinations	Notes
0.0	0.0	US 27 / SR 1 (Crawford Street) / First Street south – Bainbridge, Blakely, Brinson	Southern terminus
0.1	0.16	SR 45 / SR 91 (College Street / North 1st Street) – Donalsonville, Newton, Iron City, Damascus	Northern terminus
1.000 mi = 1.609 km; 1.000 km = 0.621 mi

=== Colquitt truck route ===
State Route 45 Truck
- Location: Colquitt
- Length: 1.6 mi (2.6 km)

State Route 45 Truck (SR 45 Truck) is a 0.5-mile-long (0.80 km) truck route that exists entirely within the central part of Miller County. Its route travels totally within the city limits of Colquitt. It is concurrent with SR 91 Truck for nearly its entire length.

It begins at an intersection with US 27/SR 1/SR 45/SR 91 (West Crawford Street) in the central part of the city, at a point where SR 45 and SR 91 end a concurrency with US 27/SR 1. This intersection is also the southern terminus of SR 91 Truck, which begins a concurrency with SR 45 Truck. US 27/SR 1/SR 45 Truck/SR 91 Truck travels to the southeast and curves to the east. They intersect the southern terminus of SR 45 Conn. (South First Street). The concurrency curves again to the southeast and intersect the southern terminus of SR 91 Spur, where the truck routes leave US 27/SR 1. SR 45 Truck/SR 91 Spur/SR 91 Truck travels to the northeast and curves to a nearly due north direction. At an intersection with SR 91 (Main Street), SR 91 Spur and SR 91 Truck end, while SR 45 Truck turns left onto SR 91. The two highway travel to the west for five blocks, to an intersection with SR 45, which is on the northeast corner of the Miller County Courthouse. Here, SR 45 Truck ends, while SR 45 and SR 91 travel around the courthouse on one way streets.

SR 45 Truck is not part of the National Highway System, a system of roadways important to the nation's economy, defense, and mobility.

The entire route is in Colquitt, Miller County.

mi	km	Destinations	Notes
0.0	0.0	US 27 north / SR 1 north / SR 45 / SR 91 (West Crawford Street / West College Street) / SR 91 Truck – Blakely, Donalsonville	Southern end of US 27/SR 1 and SR 91 Truck concurrencies; southern terminus of SR 45 Truck and SR 91 Truck
0.2	0.32	SR 45 Conn. north (South First Street)	Southern terminus of SR 45 Conn.
0.7	1.1	US 27 south / SR 1 south (East Crawford Street) / SR 91 Spur begins / East Bush Street west – Bainbridge	Northern end of US 27/SR 1 concurrency; southern end of SR 91 Spur concurrency; southern terminus of SR 91 Spur; eastern terminus of East Bush Street
1.1	1.8	SR 91 north (SR 91 Spur ends / SR 91 Truck ends / Main Street) – Albany, Newton	Northern end of SR 91 Spur and SR 91 Truck concurrencies; southern end of SR 91 concurrency; northern terminus of SR 91 Spur and SR 91 Truck
1.6	2.6	SR 45 (First Street) / SR 91 south (Main Street) – Bainbridge, Blakely, Donalsonville, Malone, FL, Iron City, Arlington	Northern end of SR 91 concurrency; northern terminus; provides access to Miller County Hospital
1.000 mi = 1.609 km; 1.000 km = 0.621 mi: Concurrency terminus

=== Arlington alternate route ===
State Route 45 Alternate
- Location: Arlington
- Length: 0.4 mi (640 m)

State Route 45 Alternate (SR 45 Alt.) is a 0.4-mile-long (0.64 km) alternate route that exists entirely within the southwestern part of Calhoun County. Its route is also completely within the city limits of Arlington and is concurrent with SR 45 Truck for its entire length. About half of the highway is also concurrent with SR 62 Truck and SR 216 Truck.

It begins at an intersection with SR 45/SR 62/SR 216 (Highland Avenue North), in the central part of Arlington. This intersection also marks the southern terminus of SR 45 Truck and SR 216 Truck and the western terminus of SR 62 Truck. SR 45 Alt./SR 45 Truck/SR 62 Truck/SR 216 Truck heads east-northeast on Cedar Street East for two blocks. Then, they turn left onto Mayhaw Avenue NE and travel north-northwest through town. One block later, they have another intersection with SR 62 (Pioneer Road). Here, SR 62 Truck ends, and SR 216 departs the concurrency. Another block later is M.L. King Drive NE. SR 45 Alt./SR 45 Truck continues to the north-northwest for one more block, where they both meet their northern terminus, a second intersection with the SR 45 mainline (Morgan Road NE).

SR 45 Alt. is not part of the National Highway System, a system of roadways important to the nation's economy, defense, and mobility.

The entire route is in Arlington, Calhoun County.

mi	km	Destinations	Notes
0.0	0.0	SR 45 / SR 62 / SR 216 (Highland Avenue North) / SR 45 Truck begins / SR 62 Truck begins / SR 216 Truck begins	Southern terminus of SR 45 Alt., SR 45 Truck, and SR 216 Truck; western terminus of SR 62 Truck; south end of SR 45 Truck and SR 62 Truck/SR 216 Truck concurrencies
0.2	0.32	SR 62 / SR 216 Truck north (Pioneer Road) / SR 62 Truck ends – Leary	Eastern terminus of SR 62 Truck; north end of SR 62 Truck/SR 216 Truck concurrency
0.4	0.64	SR 45 (Morgan Road NE) / SR 45 Truck ends – Morgan	Northern terminus of SR 45 Alt. and SR 45 Truck; north end of SR 45 Truck concurrency
1.000 mi = 1.609 km; 1.000 km = 0.621 mi: Concurrency terminus
