= Georgia State Route 200 =

State highway in Georgia, United States

State Route 200
- Georgia State Route 200 highlighted in red

Route information
- Maintained by GDOT
- Length: 38.5 mi (62.0 km)

Major junctions
- West end: SR 62 in Blakely
- US 27 / SR 1 in Blakely; SR 45 in Damascus
- East end: SR 91 in Newton

Location
- Country: United States
- State: Georgia
- Counties: Early, Baker

Highway system
- Georgia State Highway System; Interstate; US; State; Special
← SR 199	→ SR 201

State Route 200 (SR 200) is a 38.5-mile-long (62.0 km) state highway that runs west-to-east through portions of Early and Baker counties in the southwestern part of the U.S. state of Georgia. Its western terminus is in Blakely, and its eastern terminus is in Newton.

== Route description ==
SR 200 begins at an intersection with SR 62 (Magnolia Street) in Blakely. It heads southeast to an intersection with US 27/SR 1. The road heads east, curves to the southeast, and curves again to the east, until it enters Damascus. There, it has a brief concurrency with SR 45 (Brumby Avenue). SR 200 continues to the east and crosses into Baker County. It then resumes its eastern and southeastern routing for most of the remainder of its length. It curves to the northeast, and has one last curve to the east, before it reaches the Newton area. Immediately prior to the city limits is an intersection with SR 37. A little less than 2,000 feet (610 m) later, it meets its eastern terminus, an intersection with SR 91 in Newton.

SR 200 is not part of the National Highway System, a system of roadways important to the nation's economy, defense, and mobility.

== Major intersections ==
County	Location	mi	km	Destinations	Notes
Early	Blakely	0.0	0.0	SR 62 (Magnolia Street) – Hilton, Arlington	Western terminus
Early	Blakely	0.3	0.48	US 27 / SR 1	
Early	Damascus	14.8	23.8	SR 45 north (Brumby Avenue) – Arlington	Western end of SR 45 concurrency
Early	Damascus	15.0	24.1	SR 45 south (Brumby Avenue) – Colquitt	Eastern end of SR 45 concurrency
Baker		38.2	61.5	SR 37 – Newton, Camilla, Morgan	
Baker	Newton	38.5	62.0	SR 91 – Colquitt, Albany	Eastern terminus
1.000 mi = 1.609 km; 1.000 km = 0.621 mi: Concurrency terminus
