= U.S. Route 82 in Georgia =

U.S. highway in Georgia

U.S. Highway 82
- Route of US 82 in Georgia in red

Route information
- Maintained by GDOT
- Length: 232 mi (373 km)
- Existed: 1948–present

Major junctions
- West end: US 82 at the Alabama state line at the Chattahoochee River at Eufaula, AL
- US 27 / SR 1 in Cuthbert; SR 45 / SR 50 / SR 55 / SR 520 in Dawson; US 19 / SR 3 / SR 300 in Albany; I-75 in Tifton; I-75 BL / US 41 / US 319 / SR 7 / SR 35 / SR 125 in Tifton; US 1 / US 23 / US 84 / SR 4 / SR 38 in Waycross
- East end: I-95 / US 17 / SR 25 / SR 520 southwest of Brunswick

Location
- Country: United States
- State: Georgia
- Counties: Quitman, Randolph, Terrell, Lee, Dougherty, Worth, Tift, Berrien, Atkinson, Ware, Brantley, Glynn

Highway system
- United States Numbered Highway System; List; Special; Divided; Georgia State Highway System; Interstate; US; State; Special
← SR 81	→ SR 82
← SR 49	SR 50	→ SR 51

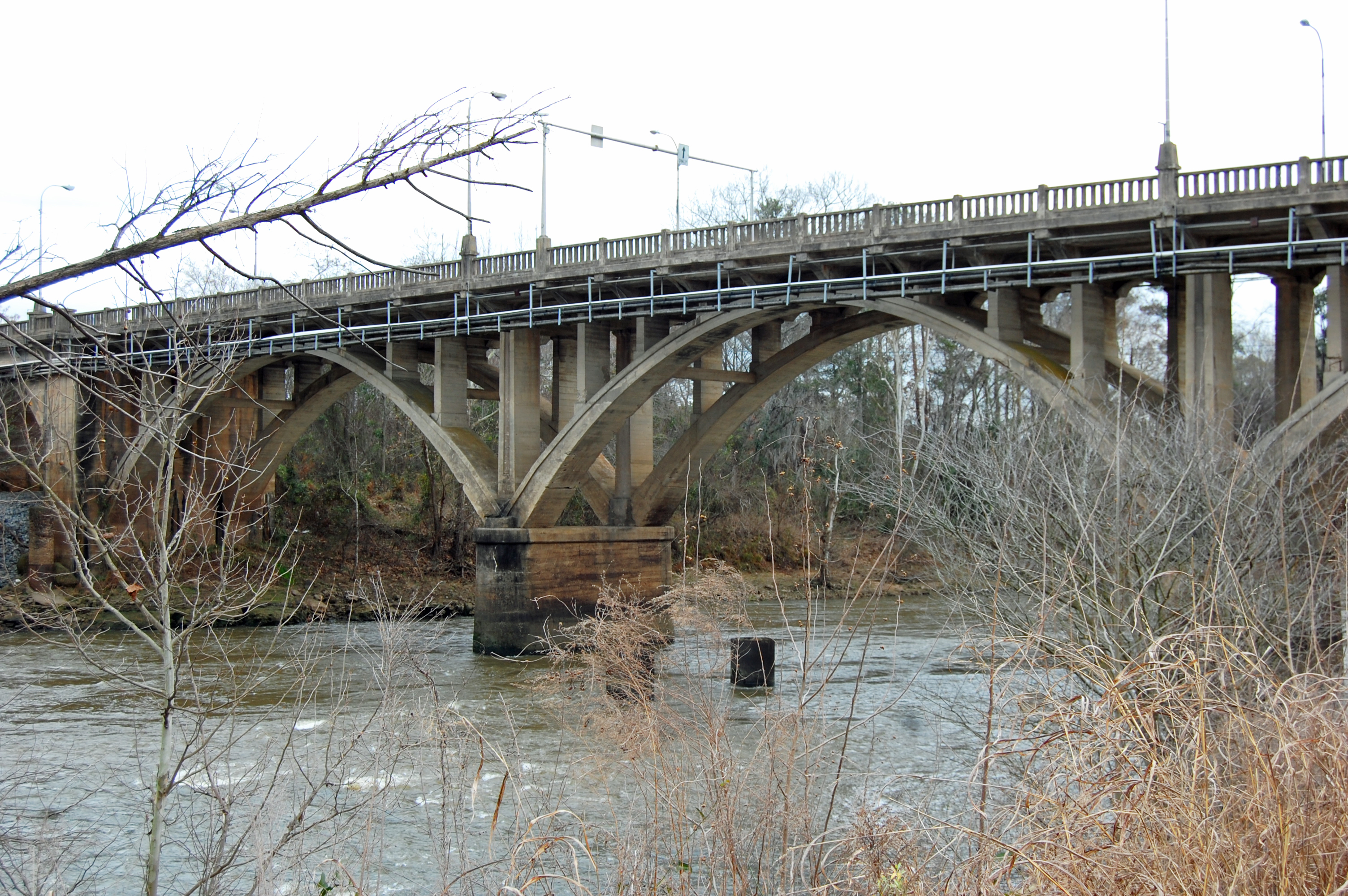
The bridge of US 82 over the Flint River in Albany

U.S. Route 82 (US 82) is a 232-mile-long (373 km) U.S. Highway in the U.S. state of Georgia. It travels from the Chattahoochee River at Georgetown to its eastern end, southwest of Brunswick. It travels through such cities as Cuthbert, Dawson, Albany, Sylvester, Tifton, Pearson, Waycross, and Nahunta.

In Georgia, every U.S. Highway has at least one state highway with which it travels concurrently. US 82 uses SR 50 from its western start to Dawson and SR 520 from Dawson to its eastern end.

SR 50 formerly extended across the state and ended in Jekyll Island. In 1981, it was truncated to Dawson, with its former path redesignated as SR 520. US 82 formerly ended in Midway. In 1989, US 82 and US 84 east of Waycross were swapped.

== Route description ==
=== Georgetown to Albany ===
US 82 begins at the Alabama state line concurrent with SR 50. On the Alabama side of the state line, US 82 is concurrent with Alabama State Route 6 (SR 6). On the Georgia side of the state line, US 82/SR 50 head east through Georgetown to an intersection with SR 27/SR 39, where SR 39 begins a concurrency to the southeast. The three highways head east until SR 39 splits off to the south. US 82/SR 50 continue to the southeast until they reach an intersection with SR 266, just before entering Cuthbert. In the town, they intersect SR 216. On the east side of town is US 27/SR 1. On the extreme northern edge of Shellman is an intersection with SR 41. Here, they begin a brief concurrency. Just past Graves, SR 45 begins a concurrency until the three routes enter Dawson. In Dawson, there is an intersection with SR 520, where SR 50 ends, the concurrency with SR 45 ends, and the concurrency with SR 520 begins. At this point on to its eastern end, US 82 is 4 lane. A short distance later is an intersection with SR 55. The two highways head southeast until they reach Albany.

=== Albany to Tifton ===
At the beginning of Albany, the two highways become a freeway known as Liberty Expressway. At the intersection with US 19/SR 3, which join the concurrency, US 19 Business/US 82 Business/SR 520 Business head south into downtown Albany. At the next exit is SR 91/SR 133. SR 133 joins the concurrency at this point. The five highways curve to the south, where US 82/SR 520 head east along with SR 300. Here, US 19/SR 3/SR 133/SR 300 continue south on the expressway. Just east of Albany, SR 300 leaves the concurrency to the northeast. US 82/SR 520 then intersect US 82 Business/SR 520 Business, where they both meet their eastern end. The concurrency heads to Sylvester. There, they meet SR 313, SR 33, and SR 112. The two routes continue east to Tifton.

=== Tifton to Waycross ===
Just after entering Tifton, the two routes meet I-75, before intersecting US 319/SR 35. The two highways join the concurrency for about 3 miles (4.8 km). In the downtown part of the town is US 41/SR 7/SR 125. After leaving the town, US 319/SR 35 leave the concurrency, while US 82/SR 520 continue to the east. Prior to entering Alapaha, the concurrent highways intersect US 129/SR 11. These highways join the concurrency until they leave in town about 1 mile (1.6 km) later. Farther to the east, in Willacoochee, US 82/SR 520 intersect SR 90 and then have a very brief concurrency with SR 135. In Pearson, the concurrency intersects US 221/US 441/SR 31/SR 64. SR 64 joins the concurrency for less than 1 mile (1.6 km). Just prior to entering Waresboro is an intersection with SR 158. About 5 miles (8.0 km) later, US 1/US 23/SR 4 join the concurrency for about 8 miles (13 km). About 3 miles (4.8 km) after the beginning of the US 1/US 23/SR 4 concurrency is SR 122. Then, the concurrency enters Waycross.

=== Waycross to eastern ending ===
In Waycross, the concurrency meets US 84/SR 38, which join for about 1 mile (1.6 km). Approximately 2 miles (3.2 km) later, US 1/US 23/SR 4 depart to the southeast, while US 82/SR 520 head to the east. At this same intersection, US 1 Business/US 23 Business/SR 4 Business head to the northwest. Southeast of Waycross is SR 177, which leads to Laura S. Walker State Park and the Okefenokee Swamp. In Hoboken, is an intersection with SR 15/SR 121. Farther to the east, in Nahunta is US 301/SR 23. In Atkinson is an intersection with SR 259 and a very brief concurrency with SR 110. Approximately 9 miles (14 km) later, US 82/SR 520 meet the western end of SR 99. Then, they have an intersection with US 17/SR 25, along with SR 303. This intersection marks the eastern end of US 82 and the southern end of SR 303, while US 17/SR 25/SR 520 head southeast.

=== National Highway System ===
The entire length of US 82 in Georgia is part of the National Highway System, a system of routes determined to be the most important for the nation's economy, mobility, and defense. This includes the entire length of SR 50, which is entirely concurrent with US 82 from the Alabama state line to Dawson.

== History ==
=== 1920s ===
The roadway that would eventually become US 82 was established at least as early as 1919 as SR 32 from Dawson through Albany and into Sylvester. It was also designated as SR 46 from Sylvester to Tifton and SR 38 from Waycross, through Blackshear and Jesup, and ended in Hinesville. By the end of 1921, SR 50 was designated from Georgetown through Cuthbert, Dawson, Albany, Sylvester, Tifton, Alapaha, Pearson, Waycross, and Hoboken, and ended at the SR 27 intersection northwest of Brunswick. This truncated SR 32 at Ashburn and absorbed all of SR 46. Also, the portion of SR 38 northeast of Hinesville was shifted southeast to end at SR 25 east-southeast of Hinesville. By the end of 1926, US 84 was designated on SR 50 east of Waycross. The eastern terminus of US 84/SR 50 was then indicated to be at the US 17/SR 25 northwest of Brunswick. The crossing of the Altamaha River between Jesup and Ludowici was indicated to have "no bridge or ferry". Two segments of SR 50 had a "completed hard surface": the eastern part of Albany and west-northwest of Sylvester. Six segments of SR 50 and one segment of SR 38 had a "completed semi hard surface": the southeastern part of Georgetown, east-southeast of Cuthbert, west-southwest of Dawson, east-southeast of Albany, the Worth County portion of the Sylvester–Tifton segment, west-northwest of Waycross, and from Waycross to Blackshear. Three portions of SR 50 and two segments of SR 38 had a "sand clay or top soil" surface: from Dawson to a point northwest of Albany, west-northwest of Pearson, west of Nahunta, from Blackshear to a point southwest of Jesup, and the western half of the Hinesville–Midway segment. One segment of SR 50 and two segments of SR 38 were indicated to be under construction: west-northwest of Albany, the Wayne County portion of the Jesup–Ludowici segment, and the eastern half of the Hinesville–Midway segment. By the end of 1929, three segments of SR 50 and one segment of SR 38 had a completed hard surface: the southeast part of Georgetown, from Dawson to a point northwest of Albany, from west-northwest of Waycross into the city, and from Waycross to Blackshear. The segment of SR 38 from Jesup to Ludowici had a completed semi hard surface. Three segments of SR 50 and two segments of SR 38 had a sand clay or top soil surface: southeast of Georgetown, from Cuthbert to Dawson, from west of Nahunta to east-northeast of that city, from about Patterson to about Screven, and from Hinesville to Midway. From about Screven to Jesup, SR 38 had completed grading. Five segments of SR 50 and one segment of SR 38 were indicated to be under construction: from a point northwest of Albany to just south of the Lee–Dougherty county line, the Atkinson county line portion of the Tifton–Pearson segment, west-northwest of Waycross, east-northeast of Waycross, from east-northeast of Nahunta to the eastern terminus of US 84/SR 50, and northeast of Blackshear.

=== 1930s ===
By the middle of 1930, three segments of SR 50 had a completed hard surface: the entire Terrell County portion except the extreme eastern part, from west of Albany to the Worth–Tift county line, and west-northwest of Waycross. The western half of the Dougherty County portion of the Dawson–Albany segment of SR 50 had a completed semi hard surface. Four segments of SR 50 were indicated to be under construction: a portion straddling the Lee–Dougherty county line, a portion east-southeast of the Berrien–Atkinson county line, a portion east-southeast of the Atkinson–Ware county line, and the Ware County portion of the Waycross–Nahunta segment. By the end of the year, the portion of SR 50 straddling the Lee–Dougherty county line had a completed semi hard surface. The portion of it straddling the Brantley–Glynn county line had completed grading, but no surface course. Four segments of SR 50 and one segment of SR 38 were indicated to be under construction: the western portion in Atkinson County, a portion east-southeast of the Atkinson–Ware county line, from Waycross to just east of the Ware–Brantley county line, the eastern portion of US 84/SR 50, and the Jesup–Ludowici segment. By the end of 1931, the portion of US 84/SR 50 from Waycross to its eastern terminus and the portion of SR 38 from northeast of Pierce–Wayne county line to Jesup had a completed hard surface. Two segments of SR 50 and one segment of SR 38 had a sand clay or top soil surface: a portion east-southeast of Cuthbert, the Alapaha–Pearson segment, and the Jesup–Hinesville segment. One segment each of both highways were indicated to be under construction: a portion west-northwest of Cuthbert and from Blackshear to northeast of the Pierce–Wayne county line. In January 1932, the Dawson–Albany segment had a completed hard surface. In March, a portion east-southeast of Tifton was indicated to be under construction. In August, one portion of each highway was indicated to be under construction: from Pearson to east-southeast of the Atkinson–Ware county line and nearly the entire Hinesville–Midway segment. In September, a portion east-southeast of Tifton had completed grading, but was not surfaced. The western half of the Alapaha–Pearson segment was indicated to be under construction. By the middle of 1933, the portion of SR 50 from Alapaha to a point east-southeast of the Berrien–Atkinson county line and the portion of SR 38 from Blackshear to Ludowici had a completed hard surface. Also the segment of SR 50 from Tifton to Alapaha was under construction. In May, the portion of SR 38 from Ludowici to Hinesville had a completed hard surface. In October, the western half of the Hinesville–Midway segment also had a completed hard surface. In March 1934, the Ware County portion of the Pearson–Waycross segment of SR 50 had a completed hard surface. A portion of the highway west-northwest of Cuthbert had completed grading, but was not surfaced. The eastern half of the Hinesville–Midway segment of SR 38 was under construction. Later that year, two segments of SR 50 and one segment of SR 38 had a completed hard surface: from the Alabama state line to Georgetown, from a point west-northwest of Alapaha to the Berrien–Atkinson county line, and the eastern half of the Hinesville–Midway segment. The Randolph County portion of the Georgetown–Cuthbert segment had completed grading, but was not surfaced. By the middle of 1935, nearly the entire Randolph County portion of the Cuthbert–Dawson segment had a completed hard surface. By the middle of the next year, a portion east-southeast of the Atkinson–Ware county line had completed grading, but was not surfaced. The Tift County portion of the Sylvester–Tifton segment was under construction. By October, the Cuthbert–Dawson segment had a completed hard surface. From southeast of Georgetown to just east of the Quitman–Randolph county line, the highway was under construction. By the middle of 1937, all of SR 50 between Cuthbert and a point east-southeast of the Berrien–Atkinson county line had a completed hard surface. From a point southeast of Georgetown to just east of the Quitman–Randolph county line, it had completed grading, but was not surfaced. By October, the entire Quitman County portion had a completed hard surface. Two segments were under construction: the Randolph County portion of the Georgetown–Cuthbert segment and a portion west of Tifton. By September 1938, the Georgetown–Cuthbert segment had a completed hard surface. In late 1939, all of SR 50, including the US 84 concurrency, and all of SR 38 from Waycross to Midway, had a completed hard surface.

=== 1940s to 1980s ===
Between February 1948 and April 1949, US 82 was designated on SR 50 from the Alabama state line to Waycross. By August 1950, SR 50 was extended southeast to a point just west of Jekyll Island. In 1952, SR 50 was extended southeast to the southern part of Jekyll Island. By September 1953, US 84 was extended on SR 50 southeast to a point south of Brunswick. Between June 1955 and July 1957, US 17/SR 25's path northeast of the US 84/SR 50 west of Brunswick was shifted south onto US 84/SR 50. Also, US 82 was extended on SR 38 from Waycross to Midway. Between June 1960 and June 1963, the path of SR& 50 through Albany was split into SR 50N and SR 50S. SR 50N used Broad Avenue and Sylvester Road, while US 82/SR 50S used Oglethorpe Avenue and Albany Expressway. In 1968, a northeastern bypass of the main part of Albany was proposed as a northern extension of SR 333 from the interchange of US 19/SR 333 and US 82/SR 50S in the eastern part of the city to US 19/SR 3W in the northwestern part of the city. In 1973, SR 50N was redesignated as SR 50 Conn., while SR 50S was redesignated as the SR 50 mainline. SR 50 was extended around the northern part of Jekyll Island. The next year, the bypass in Albany was built as a freeway, but there was no indication as to what highways were designated on it. In early 1980, US 19, US 82, and SR 333 were indicated to be designated on the Albany bypass. The old path of the highways were redesignated as US 19 Bus./US 82 Bus. with SR 3 concurrent with them in the western part of the city and SR 50 concurrent with them in the southern and eastern parts of it. Later that year, SR 333 was truncated out of Albany. SR 50 was shifted onto the US 19/US 82 freeway. Its old path in the city was redesignated as SR 50 Bus. The next year, SR 50 was truncated to the southwestern part of Jekyll Island. In 1988, SR 50 was further truncated to Dawson. Its former path from Dawson to Jekyll Island was redesignated as part of SR 520. In 1989, the segments of US 82 and US 84 east of Waycross were swapped. The Waycross–Brunswick segment of US 82 was truncated to the I-95 interchange.

== Major intersections ==
County	Location	mi	km	Destinations	Notes
Quitman		0.0	0.0	US 82 west (SR 6) – Eufaula	Alabama state line (Ernest Vandiver Causeway over Chattahoochee River); western terminus of SR 50; western end of SR 50 concurrency
Quitman	Georgetown	2.5	4.0	SR 27 north / SR 39 north – Lumpkin, Florence, Westville, Eufaula NWR Bradley Unit, Florence Marina State Park	Southern terminus of SR 27; western end of SR 39 concurrency
Quitman		4.7	7.6	SR 39 south – Fort Gaines, Blakeley	Eastern end of SR 39 concurrency
Randolph		23.3	37.5	SR 266 south – Coleman, Fort Gaines	Northern terminus of SR 266
Randolph	Cuthbert	25.1	40.4	US 27 Bus. / SR 1 Bus. (Court Street) to SR 216 – Lumpkin, Columbus, Blakely, Colquitt, Edison, Arlington	Traffic circle around main square
Randolph		26.2	42.2	US 27 / SR 1 – Lumpkin, Blakely	
Randolph	Shellman	35.7	57.5	SR 41 south (Pearl Street) – Shellman	Western end of SR 41 concurrency; former SR 50 Spur south
Terrell		36.6	58.9	SR 41 north (Bentley Road) – Weston	Eastern end of SR 41 concurrency
Terrell		42.9	69.0	SR 45 south (Doverel Highway) – Morgan, Colquitt	Western end of SR 45 concurrency
Terrell	Dawson	46.0	74.0	SR 45 north / SR 520 west (Rountree Drive) – Americus, Columbus	Eastern end of SR 45 and SR 50 concurrencies; western end of SR 520 concurrency
see SR 520
Glynn		232	373	I-95 (SR 405) / US 17 north / SR 25 north / SR 520 east – Savannah, Jacksonville, Brunswick, Jekyll Island	Eastern terminus; eastern end of US 17/SR 25 and SR 520 concurrencies; I-95 exit 29
1.000 mi = 1.609 km; 1.000 km = 0.621 mi: Concurrency terminus

== See also ==
- Special routes of U.S. Route 82

U.S. Route 82
Previous state: Alabama	Georgia	Next state: Terminus
