= Georgia State Route 55 =

State highway in southwestern Georgia

State Route 55
- SR 55 highlighted in red

Route information
- Maintained by GDOT
- Length: 21.0 mi (33.8 km)

Major junctions
- South end: SR 37 / SR 62 in Leary
- SR 234 west of Albany
- North end: US 82 / SR 520 in Dawson

Location
- Country: United States
- State: Georgia
- Counties: Calhoun, Terrell

Highway system
- Georgia State Highway System; Interstate; US; State; Special
← SR 54B	→ SR 56

State Route 55 (SR 55) is a 21.0-mile-long (33.8 km) state highway that runs south-to-north through portions of Calhoun and Terrell counties in the southwestern part of the U.S. state of Georgia. It connects the Leary and Dawson areas of the state.

== Route description ==
SR 55 begins at an intersection with SR 37/SR 62 in Leary, in Calhoun County. It heads northeast on Mercer Avenue, before traveling to the north on Bray Street. It travels northeast, through rural sections of the county. The highway passes the Spring Creek Cemetery. Just over 1 mile (1.6 km) after intersecting SR 234, the route crosses into Terrell County. The highway continues to the north until it meets its northern terminus, an intersection with US 82/SR 520 in Dawson.

A largely rural route, State Route 55 sees an Average Annual Daily Traffic of less than 2,000 vehicles.

== History ==
SR 55 used to continue north, into Cusseta, along what is now US 82/SR 520, but was superseded, and thus replaced, upon the commissioning of US 82/SR 520.

== Major intersections ==
County	Location	mi	km	Destinations	Notes
Calhoun	Leary	0.0	0.0	SR 37 (Depot Street) / SR 62 (Mercer Avenue/Depot Street)	Southern terminus
Calhoun		8.1	13.0	SR 234 (Gill Barrett Highway) – Morgan, Albany	
Terrell	Dawson	21.0	33.8	US 82 / SR 520 – Cuthbert, Richland, Albany	Northern terminus
1.000 mi = 1.609 km; 1.000 km = 0.621 mi

== Cusseta business loop ==
State Route 55 Business
- Location: Cusseta
- Length: 2.3 mi (3.7 km)
- Existed: 1972–1988

State Route 55 Business (SR 55 Bus.) was a business loop of SR 55 that existed entirely within the city of Cusseta. It followed Broad Street through the city.

SR 55 Bus. was established in 1972, when the road that is now SR 520 was established as part of SR 55. In 1988, the same year that SR 520 was designated in Georgia, and SR 55 was decommissioned, SR 55 Bus. was redesignated as SR 520 Bus.
