= Georgia State Route 216 =

State highway in Georgia, United States

State Route 216
- Georgia State Route 216 highlighted in red

Route information
- Maintained by GDOT
- Length: 40.35 mi (64.94 km)

Major junctions
- Southeast end: SR 37 northwest of Newton
- SR 45 / SR 62 in Arlington; SR 37 in Edison
- North end: US 27 / SR 1 south of Cuthbert

Location
- Country: United States
- State: Georgia
- Counties: Baker, Early, Calhoun, Randolph

Highway system
- Georgia State Highway System; Interstate; US; State; Special
← SR 215	→ SR 217

State Route 216 (SR 216) is a 40.35-mile-long (64.94 km) state highway located in the southwestern part of the U.S. state of Georgia. It runs southeast-to-north through portions of Baker, Early, Calhoun, and Randolph counties.

== Route description ==
SR 216 begins at an intersection with SR 37 northwest of Newton, in central Baker County. It heads northwest, crossing into Early County, until it reaches Arlington. Almost immediately is an intersection with SR 45 (Joe Bryan Highway), which begins a concurrency with SR 216. Just after this is SR 62 (Blakely Road SW), which joins the concurrency. In downtown Arlington, the three highways enter Calhoun County and cross a Norfolk Southern Railway track. Then, SR 62 departs to the northeast on Pioneer Road. Two blocks later, SR 45 leaves the concurrency to the northeast on Morgan Road NE. SR 216 heads north to Edison, where it has a brief concurrency with SR 37 (Hartford Street). The highway heads north, curves to the northwest, and then curves back to the north, until it enters Randolph County. It continues heading north until it meets is northern terminus, an intersection with US 27/SR 1, just south of Cuthbert.

== Major intersections ==
County	Location	mi	km	Destinations	Notes
Baker		0.000	0.000	SR 37 – Camilla, Morgan	Southern terminus
Early	Arlington	16.115	25.935	SR 45 south (Joe Bryan Highway) – Colquitt	Southern end of SR 45 concurrency
Early	Arlington	16.510	26.570	SR 62 west (Blakely Road SW) – Blakely	Southern end of SR 62 concurrency
Calhoun	Arlington	17.129	27.566	SR 45 Alt. north / SR 45 Truck north / SR 62 Truck east / SR 216 Truck north (Cedar Street)	Southern terminus of SR 45 Alt./SR 45 Truck/SR 216 Truck; western terminus of SR 62 Truck
Calhoun	Arlington	17.215	27.705	SR 62 east (SR 216 Truck / Pioneer Road) – Albany	Northern end of SR 62 concurrency; northern terminus of SR 216 Truck
Calhoun	Arlington	17.389	27.985	SR 45 north (Morgan Road NE) – Morgan	Northern end of SR 45 concurrency
Calhoun	Edison	25.614	41.222	SR 37 west (Hartford Street West) – Fort Gaines	Southern end of SR 37 concurrency
Calhoun	Edison	25.969	41.793	SR 37 east (Hartford Street East) – Morgan	Northern end of SR 37 concurrency
Randolph		40.354	64.943	US 27 / SR 1 (Cuthbert Bypass)	Northern terminus
1.000 mi = 1.609 km; 1.000 km = 0.621 mi: Concurrency terminus

== Arlington truck route ==
State Route 216 Truck
- Location: Arlington
- Length: 0.28 mi (450 m)

State Route 216 Truck (SR 216 Truck) is a 0.28-mile-long (0.45 km) truck route of SR 216 that exists in the southwestern part of Calhoun County. Its entire length is within the city limits of Arlington. It is concurrent with SR 45 Alt., SR 45 Truck, and SR 62 Truck for about two-thirds of its length and with SR 62 for the last third.

SR 45 Alt. and the three truck routes begin at an intersection with SR 45/SR 62/SR 216 (Highland Avenue) in the central part of Arlington. They travel to the east-northeast on Cedar Street for two blocks. At Mayhaw Avenue, they turn left and travel north-northwest for one block. At an intersection with SR 62 (Pioneer Road), SR 62 Truck ends, SR 216 Truck turns left onto SR 62, and SR 45 Alt. and SR 45 Truck continue along Mayhaw Avenue. SR 62 and SR 216 Truck travel to the west-southwest for two blocks. At a second intersection with SR 45 and SR 216, SR 216 Truck ends, and SR 62 turns left onto the other mainline highways.

The entire route is in Arlington, Calhoun County.

mi	km	Destinations	Notes
0.000	0.000	SR 45 / SR 62 / SR 216 (Highland Avenue) / SR 45 Alt. begins / SR 45 Truck begins / SR 62 Truck begins – Blakely, Colquitt	Southern terminus of SR 45 Alt./SR 45 Truck/SR 216 Truck; western terminus of SR 62 Truck; south end of SR 45 Alt./SR 45 Truck/SR 62 Truck concurrency
0.179	0.288	SR 45 Alt. north / SR 45 Truck north (Mayhaw Avenue) / SR 62 (Pioneer Road) / SR 62 Truck ends – Leary	Eastern terminus of SR 62 Truck; north end of SR 45 Alt./SR 45 Truck/SR 62 Truck concurrency; south end of SR 62 concurrency
0.276	0.444	SR 45 / SR 62 west / SR 216 – Blakely, Cuthbert, Morgan	Northern terminus; north end of SR 62 concurrency
1.000 mi = 1.609 km; 1.000 km = 0.621 mi: Concurrency terminus
