= Georgia State Route 234 =

State highway in Georgia

State Route 234
- SR 234 highlighted in red

Route information
- Maintained by GDOT
- Length: 28.3 mi (45.5 km)
- Existed: 1946–present

Major junctions
- West end: SR 45 northeast of Morgan
- SR 55 northeast of Leary; US 19 Bus. / US 82 Bus. / SR 520 Bus. in Albany; SR 62 in Albany; SR 91 in Albany
- East end: US 19 / SR 3 / SR 133 / SR 300 in Albany

Location
- Country: United States
- State: Georgia
- Counties: Calhoun, Dougherty

Highway system
- Georgia State Highway System; Interstate; US; State; Special
← SR 233	→ SR 235

State Route 234 (SR 234) is a 28.3-mile-long (45.5 km) east–west state highway located in the southwestern part of the U.S. state of Georgia. It travels through portions of Calhoun and Dougherty counties.

== Route description ==
SR 234 begins at an intersection with SR 45 northeast of Morgan in Calhoun County. The route runs east, passing Calhoun County Road 45 (Lizard Lope Road, which leads to Conley Cemetery), Calhoun CR 136 (Wildemeade Road), and Calhoun CR 119, before it reaches an intersection with SR 55, northeast of Leary. Shortly after SR 55, the route crosses into Dougherty County. Farther to the east, SR 234 intersects Tallahassee Road, which leads to Sasser. Just before entering Albany, the road passes Live Oak Elementary School. In downtown Albany, it passes Albany State West College. Farther in, it has a very brief concurrency with US 19 Business/US 82 Business/SR 520 Business. Then, it passes Albany Technical College just before intersections with SR 62 (Slappey Boulevard) and SR 91 (Newton Road). SR 91 leads to Southwest Georgia Regional Airport. Just before ending, it crosses over the Flint River. On the eastern edge of Albany it meets its eastern terminus, an interchange with US 19/SR 3/SR 133/SR 300. Here, US 19/SR 3/SR 300, as well as SR 133 north, are known as Liberty Expressway, while SR 133 south continues the roadway of SR 234 along Moultrie Road.

No section of SR 234 is part of the National Highway System.

== History ==
SR 234 was established, and paved, in 1946 along the same alignment as it runs today.

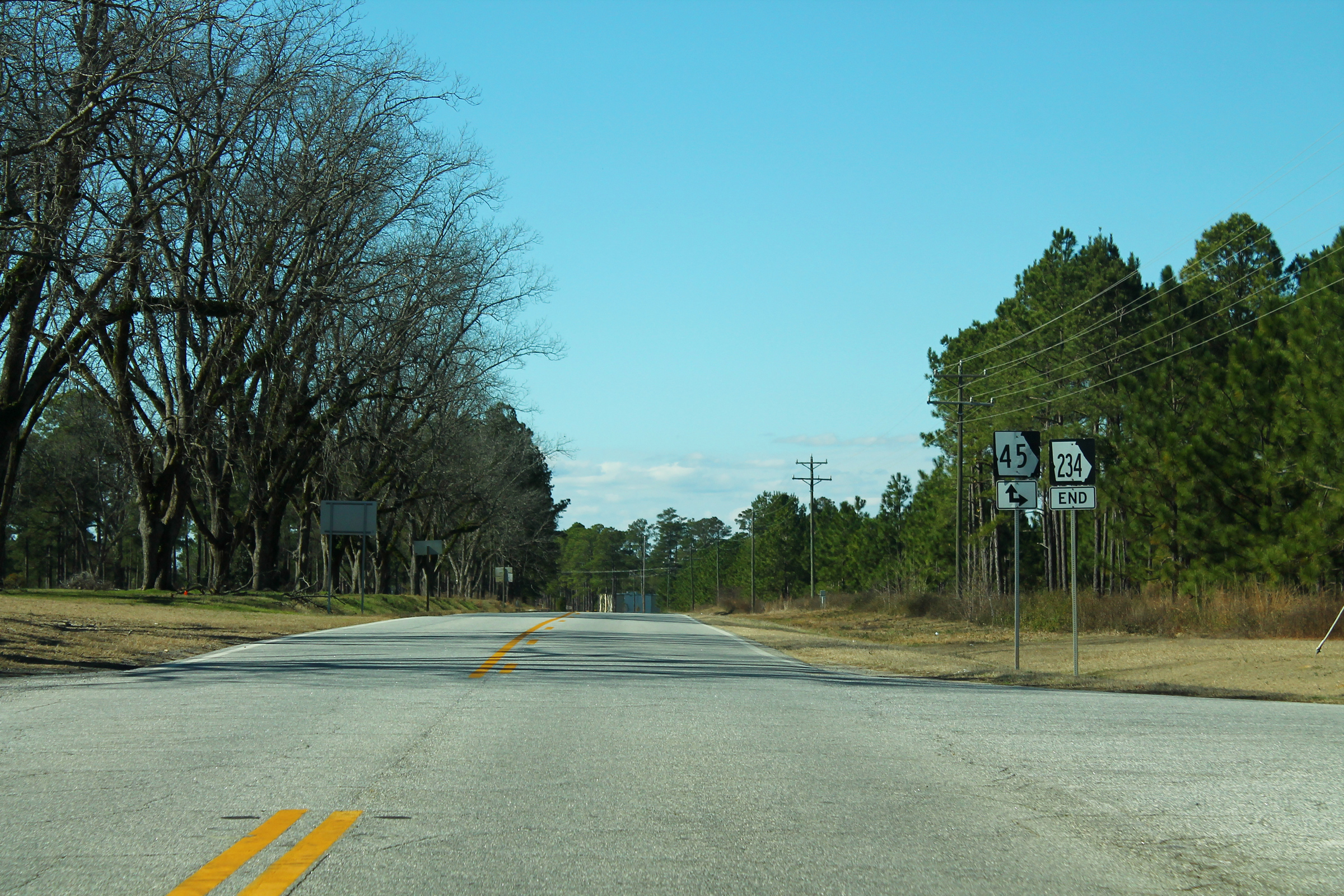
Western terminus of SR 234 in Calhoun County

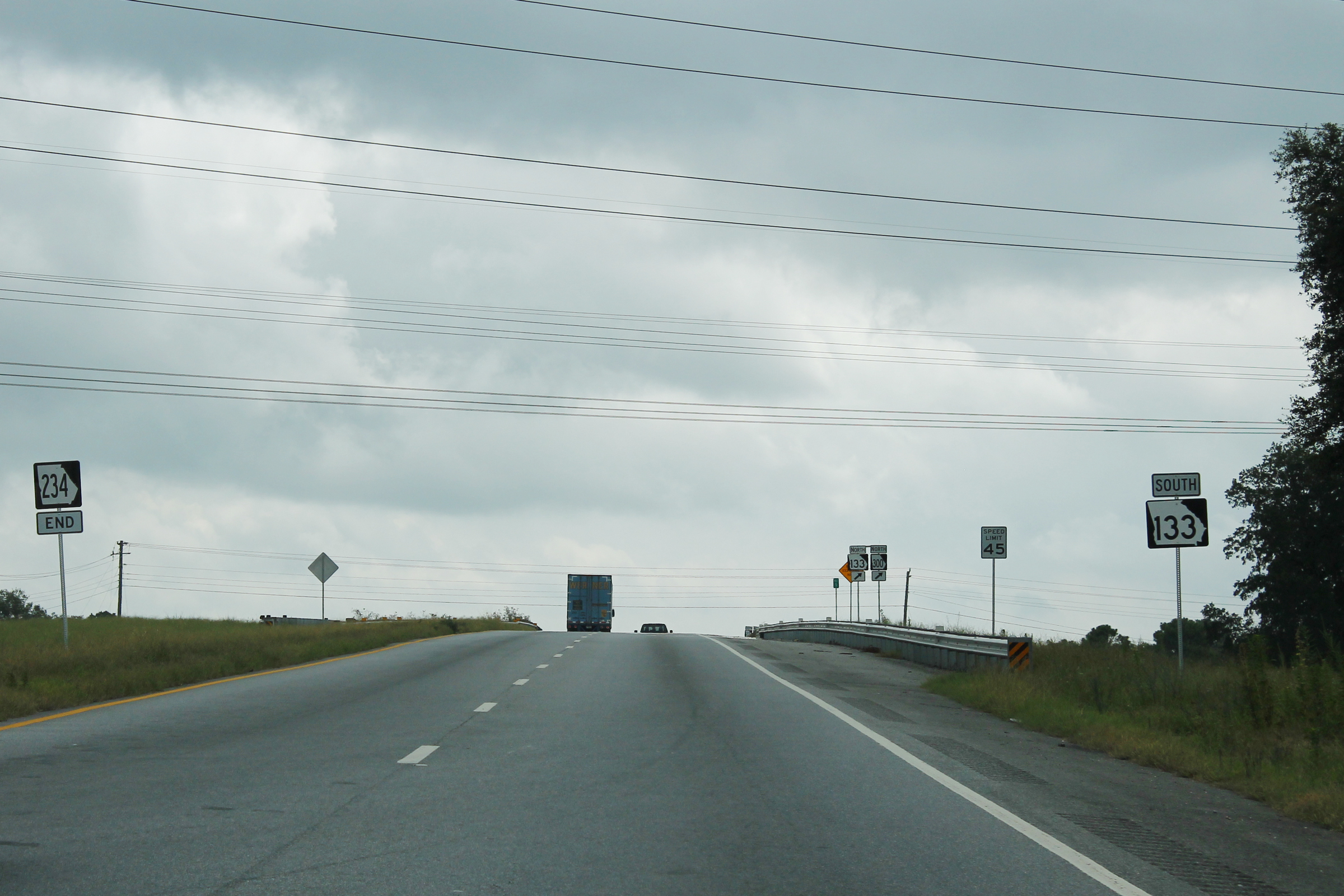
Eastern terminus of SR 234 in Albany

== Major intersections ==
County	Location	mi	km	Destinations	Notes
Calhoun		0.0	0.0	SR 45 – Morgan, Dawson	Western terminus
Calhoun		4.3	6.9	SR 55 – Leary, Dawson	
Dougherty	Albany	22.6	36.4	US 19 Bus. north / US 82 Bus. west / SR 520 Bus. west (North Slappey Boulevard) – Americus	Western end of US 19 Business/US 82 Business/SR 520 Business concurrency
Dougherty	Albany	22.9	36.9	US 19 Bus. south / US 82 Bus. east / SR 520 Bus. east (West Oglethorpe Boulevard) – Camilla	Eastern end of US 19 Business/US 82 Business/SR 520 Business concurrency
Dougherty	Albany	24.7	39.8	SR 62 west (Slappey Boulevard) – Leary	Eastern terminus of SR 62
Dougherty	Albany	24.8	39.9	SR 91 (Newton Road) – Newton	
Dougherty	Albany	28.3	45.5	US 19 / SR 3 / SR 133 / SR 300 – Camilla, Moultrie	Eastern terminus; US 19 north/SR 3 north/SR 133 north/SR 300 north, as well as US 19 south/SR 3 south/SR 300 south run along Liberty Expressway; SR 133 south runs along Moultrie Road.
1.000 mi = 1.609 km; 1.000 km = 0.621 mi: Concurrency terminus
