= List of special state routes in Georgia =

- Standard State Route shields

System information
- Notes: State Routes are generally state-maintained.

Highway names
- Interstates: Interstate X (I-X)
- US Highways: U.S. Highway X (US X)
- State: State Route X (SR X)

System links
- Georgia State Highway System; Interstate; US; State; Special

The State Routes in the U.S. state of Georgia (typically abbreviated SR) are maintained by the Georgia Department of Transportation (GDOT). Routes from 400 to 499 are mostly unsigned internal designations for Interstate Highways. Some of the Governor's Road Improvement Program (GRIP) corridors are numbered from 500 to 599.

== Special routes ==
Number	Length (mi)	Length (km)	Southern or western terminus	Northern or eastern terminus	Formed	Removed	Notes
SR 1 Bus.	3.473	5.589	US 27 / SR 1 / US 27 Bus. southeast of Attapulgus	US 27 / SR 1 / US 27 Bus. north of Attapulgus	1995	current	Formerly part of US 27 / SR 1; completely concurrent with US 27 Bus.
SR 1 Bus.	3.064	4.931	US 27 / US 27 Bus. / US 84 / SR 1 / SR 38 in Bainbridge	US 27 / US 27 Bus. / US 84 / SR 1 / SR 38 in Bainbridge	1976	current	Formerly part of US 27 / SR 1; completely concurrent with US 27 Bus.
SR 1 Bus.	4.315	6.944	US 27 / US 27 Bus. / SR 1 in Blakely	US 27 / US 27 Bus. / SR 1 in Blakely	1993	current	Formerly part of US 27 / SR 1; completely concurrent with US 27 Bus.
SR 1 Bus.	3.297	5.306	US 27 / US 27 Bus. / SR 1 south of Cuthbert	US 27 / US 27 Bus. / SR 1 north of Cuthbert	1994	current	Formerly part of US 27 / SR 1; completely concurrent with US 27 Bus.
SR 1 Conn.	0.719	1.157	SR 27 in Lumpkin	US 27 / SR 1 north of Lumpkin	2001	current	
SR 1 Spur	—	—	SR 85 in Fort Benning	US 27 / US 280 / SR 1 in Columbus	1946	1969	Partially redesignated as SR 357 and SR 103 Spur
SR 1 Bus.	—	—	US 27 / US 280 / SR 1 in Columbus	US 27 / SR 1 in Columbus	1966	1975	Temporary redesignation of SR 1; was completely concurrent with US 27
SR 1 Spur	—	—	US 80 / US 280 at the Alabama state line on the Phenix City–Columbus line	US 27 / US 80 / US 280 / SR 1 in Columbus	1963	1988	Was completely concurrent with US 280 and, later, US 80
SR 1 Spur	—	—	US 27 / SR 1 / SR 219 in LaGrange	US 29 / SR 14 / SR 109 in LaGrange	1963	1971	Redesignated as a western rerouting of SR 1
SR 1 Bus.	4.748	7.641	US 27 / US 27 Bus. / SR 1 in Bremen	US 27 / US 27 Bus. / SR 1 north of Bremen	1993	current	Formerly part of US 27 / SR 1; completely concurrent with US 27 Bus.
SR 1 Bus.	2.397	3.858	US 27 / US 27 Bus. / SR 1 southeast of Buchanan	US 27 / US 27 Bus. / SR 1 north of Buchanan	1992	current	Formerly part of US 27 / SR 1; completely concurrent with US 27 Bus.
SR 1 Bus.	4.222	6.795	US 27 / US 27 Bus. / SR 1 / SR 100 in Cedartown	US 27 / US 27 Bus. / SR 1 in Cedartown	1991	current	Completely concurrent with US 27 Bus.
SR 1 Spur	—	—	US 27 / SR 1 south-southwest of Rome	US 27 / US 411 / SR 53 south-southwest of Rome	1946	1955	Temporary redesignation of SR 1
SR 1 Spur	—	—	US 27 / US 411 / SR 1 / SR 53 in Rome	US 411 / SR 101 in Rome	1960	1966	Redesignated as SR 53 Spur
SR 1 Loop	11.758	18.923	US 411 / SR 20 in Rome	SR 20 in Rome	1992	current	
SR 1 Bus.	3.344	5.382	US 27 / US 27 Bus. / SR 1 in LaFayette	US 27 / US 27 Bus. / SR 1 in LaFayette	1988	current	Formerly part of US 27 / SR 1; completely concurrent with US 27 Bus.
SR 3 Alt.	18.9	30.4	US 19 / US 84 / US 319 / SR 3 / SR 35 / SR 38 / SR 300 northeast of Thomasville	US 19 / SR 3 / SR 111 / SR 300 east of Meigs	2000	current	Formerly part of US 19 / SR 3
SR 3 Conn.	—	—	US 19 / US 82 / SR 3 / SR 50 / SR 91 in Albany	US 19 / SR 3 north of Albany	1957	1960	Temporary redesignation of SR 3
SR 3 Byp.	1.8	2.9	US 19 / US 19 Byp. / SR 3 / SR 32 / SR 32 Truck in Leesburg	US 19 / US 19 Byp. / SR 3 in Leesburg	—	—	Completely concurrent with US 19 Byp.
SR 3 Conn.	1.1	1.8	US 19 / US 41 / SR 3 west of Morrow	I-75 / SR 401 west of Morrow	—	—	
SR 3 Conn.	0.2	0.32	US 29 / SR 14 / SR 154 in Atlanta	US 19 / US 29 / US 41 / SR 3 in Atlanta	—	—	Completely concurrent with US 29
SR 3 Spur	—	—	US 41 / SR 3 in Atlanta	I-75 / US 41 / SR 3E in Atlanta	1965	1969	Formerly part of SR 3; redesignated as a southern extension of SR 3E; was entirely concurrent with US 41
SR 3 Spur	—	—	—	—	—	—	Formerly SR 3S
SR 3 Conn.	—	—	SR 5 in Marietta	SR 3 in Marietta	1965	1984	Redesignated as part of SR 5
SR 3 Conn.	1.6	2.6	US 41 / SR 3 in Marietta	SR 120 / SR 120 Alt. in Marietta	—	—	
SR 3 Conn.	0.7	1.1	Dug Gap Road south of Dalton	US 41 / SR 3 south of Dalton	—	—	
SR 4 Bus.	9.622	15.485	US 1 / US 1 Bus. / US 23 / US 23 Bus. / US 82 / SR 4 / SR 520 in Waycross	US 1 / US 1 Bus. / US 23 / US 23 Bus. / SR 4 northwest of Waycross	1996	current	Completely concurrent with US 1 Bus./US 23 Bus.; formerly part of US 1/SR 4
SR 4 Spur	—	—	US 1 / US 23 / SR 4 in Alma	US 1 / US 23 / SR 4 north of Alma	1946	1980	Redesignated as SR 4 Alt.
SR 4 Alt.	1.613	2.596	US 1 / US 23 / SR 4 in Alma	US 1 / US 23 / SR 4 in Alma	1980	2017	Formerly SR 4 Spur
SR 4 Bus.	7.876	12.675	US 1 / US 1 Bus. / SR 4 / SR 57 south of Swainsboro	US 1 / US 1 Bus. / SR 4 northwest of Swainsboro	2004	current	Completely concurrent with US 1 Bus.; formerly part of US 1/SR 4
SR 4 Bus.	3.645	5.866	US 1 / US 1 Bus. / SR 4 south of Wadley	US 1 / US 1 Bus. / SR 4 north of Wadley	1966	current	Completely concurrent with US 1
SR 4 Bus.	2.900	4.667	US 1 / US 1 Bus. / SR 4 in Louisville	US 1 / US 1 Bus. / US 1 Bus. / US 221 / SR 4 / SR 17 in Louisville	1966	current	Completely concurrent with US 1 Bus.
SR 5 Spur	—	—	SR 5 in Marietta	Polk Street in Marietta	1972	1983	
SR 5 Spur	1.670	2.688	Church Street in Marietta	Canton Road north of Marietta	1989	current	
SR 5 Conn.	—	—	SR 3 in Elizabeth	US 41 / SR 3E in Marietta	1956	1984	
SR 5 Conn.	—	—	I-75 / SR 401 in Marietta	SR 5 north of Marietta	1976	1984	
SR 5 Conn.	2.092	3.367	US 41 / SR 3 in Kennesaw	I-575 / SR 5 / SR 417 east of Kennesaw	1996	current	Part of the Ernest W. Barrett Parkway
SR 5 Spur	—	—	SR 5 south-southwest of Canton	SR 20 in Canton	1940	1953	
SR 5 Bus.	1.750	2.816	I-575 / SR 5 / SR 20 / SR 140 / SR 417 in Canton	I-575 / SR 5 / SR 417 in Canton	1985	current	
SR 5 Conn.	1.4	2.3	SR 140 in Canton	SR 5 Business in Canton	2008	current	
SR 5 Bus.	1.325	2.132	I-575 / SR 5 / SR 417 in Ball Ground	I-575 / SR 5 / SR 372 / SR 417 / SR 515 west of Nelson	1990	current	
SR 5 Alt.	—	—	SR 5 south of Nelson	SR 5 / SR 136 west-northwest of Talking Rock	1981	1986	
SR 5 Alt.	8.3	13.4	SR 5 south-southwest of Ellijay	US 76 / SR 5 northeast of Ellijay	1983	1985	
SR 5 Spur	—	—	SR 52 in Ellijay	US 76 / SR 5 in Ellijay	1959	1979	
SR 5 Byp.	—	—	US 76 / SR 5 south-southwest of Blue Ridge	SR 5 in Blue Ridge	1965	1976	
SR 5 Bus.	—	—	US 76 / US 76 Bus. / SR 2 / SR 5 south-southwest of Blue Ridge	US 76 / US 76 Bus. / SR 2 / SR 5 in Blue Ridge	1976	1988	
SR 6 Loop	—	—	US 278 / SR 6 / SR 100 in Cedartown	US 27 / SR 1 in Cedartown	1965	1982	Redesignated as a western rerouting of SR 6
SR 6 Bus.	3.2	5.1	US 278 / US 278 / SR 6 west of Rockmart	US 278 / US 278 / SR 6 / SR 101 in Rockmart	1991	current	Completely concurrent with US 278 Bus.
SR 6 Spur	—	—	SR 61 southeast of Dallas	US 278 / SR 6 southeast of Dallas	1966	1983	
SR 6 Byp.	—	—	US 278 / SR 6 west-southwest of Dallas	US 278 / SR 6 / SR 120 southeast of Dallas	proposed	—	Proposed as a southern bypass of Dallas; was later proposed as SR 768
SR 6 Bus.	6.0	9.7	US 278 / SR 6 / SR 120 in Dallas	US 278 / SR 6 in Hiram	1992	current	
SR 6 Bus.	—	—	US 278 / SR 6 in Powder Springs	US 278 / SR 6 in Austell	1986	2001	Formerly part of US 278 / SR 6
SR 6 Spur	0.8	1.3	US 278 / SR 6 in Austell	Powder Springs Road in Austell	2012	current	
SR 7 Bus.	7.0	11.3	US 41 / US 41 Bus. / SR 7 / SR 31 south of Valdosta	US 41 / US 41 Bus. / SR 7 in Valdosta	2006	current	Completely concurrent with US 41 Bus.
SR 7 Spur	—	—	US 41 Bus. / SR 7 Bus. in Valdosta	US 41 Bus. / SR 7 Bus. in Valdosta	1946	1963	Redesignated as SR 7 Loop
SR 7 Loop	—	—	I-75 Bus. / US 41 Bus. / SR 7 Bus. in Valdosta	US 41 Bus. / SR 7 Bus. in Valdosta	1963	1982	Formerly SR 7 Spur; redesignated as SR 7 Alt.
SR 7 Alt.	2.8	4.5	I-75 Bus. / US 41 Bus. / SR 7 Bus. in Valdosta	US 41 Bus. / SR 7 Bus. in Valdosta	1982	current	Formerly SR 7 Loop
SR 7 Conn.	1.3	2.1	US 41 / SR 7 northwest of Valdosta	I-75 / SR 401 northwest of Valdosta	1963	1982	Redesignated as the SR 7 mainline
SR 7 Spur	0.3	0.48	General Courtney Hodges Boulevard in Perry US 341 / SR 11 in Perry	US 41 / SR 7 / SR 127 / SR 224 in Perry US 41 / US 341 / SR 7 / SR 11 in Perry	1965	current	Southern segment was formerly part of US 41 / SR 7; northern segment was formerly part of US 341 / SR 11; southern segment was redesignated as SR 7 Conn.; northern segment was redesignated as part of SR 11; southern segment was later reverted to being SR 7 Spur.
SR 7 Conn.	—	—	General Courtney Hodges Boulevard in Perry	US 41 / SR 7 / SR 127 in Perry	1970	1989	Temporary redesignation of the current SR 7 Spur
SR 7 Conn.	0.2	0.32	US 341 / SR 7 in Fort Valley	SR 96 in Fort Valley	1970	current	
SR 7 Conn.	—	—	US 41 / SR 7 in Barnesville	US 41 / US 341 / SR 7 in Barnesville	1967	1985	Formerly part of US 41 / SR 7; redesignated as part of SR 18; was completely concurrent with US 41
SR 8 Alt.	—	—	SR 46 at the Alabama state line west of Bowdon	US 78 / SR 8 / SR 61 in Villa Rica	1948	1954	Formerly a southern branch of SR 8; was path of US 78S and then US 78 Alt.; redesignated as SR 166 from the Alabama state line to northeast of Carrollton and SR 61 from there to Villa Rica
SR 8 Conn.	0.2	0.32	I-20 / SR 402 in Villa Rica	US 78 / SR 8 in Villa Rica	2008	current	Northern terminus formerly existed slightly to the west
SR 8 Spur	—	—	Original branch of US 29 / Northern branch of US 29 / SR 8 west-southwest of Decatur	Original branch of US 29 / Northern branch of US 29 / SR 8 north-northeast of Decatur	1946	1954	Was completely concurrent with a northern branch of US 29
SR 8 Bus.	—	—	US 29 / US 78 / SR 8 / SR 10 in Athens	US 29 / SR 8 / SR 106 in Athens	1966	1978	Formerly part of SR 8
SR 8 Conn.	—	—	US 29 / SR 8 / SR 98 Conn. in Danielsvile	SR 98 northwest of Danielsville	1946	1949	Formerly part of SR 36 and SR 98; redesignated as a northern extension of SR 98 Conn.
SR 8 Spur	—	—	US 29 / SR 8 in Royston	SR 17 in Royston	1949	1985	
SR 8 Spur	—	—	US 29 / SR 8 / SR 181 in Hartwell	Shore of Lake Hartwell	1977	1983	Formerly part of US 29 / SR 8
SR 9 Conn.	1.4	2.3	SR 400 in Roswell	US 19 / SR 9 / SR 140 in Roswell	1970	1981	Redesignated as an eastern extension of SR 140
SR 10 Byp.	—	—	US 78 / SR 10 / SR 10 Bus. west of Monroe	US 78 / SR 10 / SR 10 Bus. in Monroe	1966	1988	Redesignated as part of SR 10
SR 10 Bus.	4.0	6.4	US 78 / SR 10 west of Monroe	US 78 / SR 10 in Monroe	1966	current	
SR 10 Loop	19.1	30.7	Beltway around Athens		1988	current	
SR 10 Bus.	4.6	7.4	US 78 / US 78 Bus. / SR 10 northwest of Washington	US 78 / US 78 Bus. / US 378 / SR 10 / SR 17 / SR 17 Bus. / SR 47 in Washington	1970	current	Completely concurrent with US 78 Bus.
SR 10 Loop	—	—	US 78 / US 78 Bus. / SR 10 / SR 10 Bus. northwest of Washington	US 78 / US 78 Bus. / US 378 / SR 10 / SR 10 Bus. / SR 17 / SR 17 Bus. / SR 47 in Washington	1970	1986	Was completely concurrent with US 78 and possibly SR 10
SR 11 Byp.	0.6	0.97	US 129 / SR 11 / SR 37 in Lakeland	US 129 / US 221 / SR 11 / SR 31 / SR 37 / SR 122 / SR 135 Byp. in Lakeland	1946	current	
SR 11 Conn.	0.062	0.100	SR 122 in Lakeland	US 129 / SR 11 / SR 37 in Lakeland	1963	current	
SR 11 Bus.	—	—	US 129 Alt. / US 129 Bus. / US 341 Bus. / SR 27 / SR 112 / SR 257 in Hawkinsville	US 129 / US 129 Bus. / US 341 / US 341 / SR 11 in Hawkinsville	1989	current	Completely concurrent with US 129 Bus./US 341 Bus.
SR 11 Spur	—	—	SR 230 southwest of Hawkinsville	US 341 / SR 11 northwest of Hawkinsville	1963	1989	Redesignated as the southbound lanes of US 341 / SR 11
SR 11 Bus.	—	—	US 341 / US 341 Byp. / SR 11 in Perry	US 41 / US 341 Byp. / SR 11 / SR 11 Conn. in Perry	1994	current	Formerly part of SR 11; completely concurrent with US 341 Byp. and US 41
SR 11 Byp.	—	—	US 341 / SR 11 in Perry	US 41 / SR 11 in Perry	1965	1982	Redesignated as part of SR 127
SR 11 Spur	—	—	US 341 / SR 7 in Perry	US 41 / SR 11 in Perry	1968	1982	Redesignated as part of SR 11
SR 11 Conn.	2.8	4.5	US 41 / US 341 Byp. / SR 11 / SR 11 Bus. in Perry	US 341 / US 341 Byp. / SR 7 in Perry	1996	current	Partially formerly proposed as SR 866; completely concurrent with US 341 Byp.
SR 11 Conn.	3.1	5.0	US 129 / US 129 Bus. / SR 15 Alt. in Arcade	US 129 / SR 11 / SR 11 Bus. in Jefferson	2003	current	Formerly SR 837; completely concurrent with US 129
SR 11 Bus.	5.4	8.7	US 129 / SR 11 / SR 11 Conn. in Jefferson	US 129 / US 129 Bus. / SR 11 north of Jefferson	2003	current	
SR 11 Bus.	3.2	5.1	US 129 Bus. / SR 11 / SR 60 / SR 369 in Gainesville	US 129 / SR 11 in Gainesville	1990	current	
SR 11 Conn.	—	—	SR 13 in Gainesville	US 129 / SR 11 in Gainesville	1969	1990	Partially redesignated as part of US 129/SR 11
SR 11 Byp.	3.0	4.8	US 129 / US 129 Byp. / SR 11 south of Cleveland	US 129 / US 129 Byp. / SR 11 / SR 75 Conn. north-northwest of Cleveland	2016	current	Completely concurrent with US 129 Byp.
SR 11 Truck	2.2	3.5	US 19 / US 129 / US 129 Truck / SR 11 southeast of Blairsville	US 19 / US 76 / US 129 / US 129 Truck / SR 2 / SR 11 / SR 515 in Blairsville	—	2016	Was completely concurrent with US 129 Truck; redesignated as an eastern rerouting of US 129 / SR 11
SR 12 Truck	5.6	9.0	US 278 / US 278 Truck / SR 12 / SR 24 Spur / SR 83 in Madison	US 129 / US 129 Byp. / US 278 / US 278 Truck / US 441 / US 441 Byp. / SR 12 / SR 24 / SR 24 Byp. northeast of Madison	—	—	Completely concurrent with US 278 Truck
SR 12 Byp.	1.6	2.6	US 278 / US 278 Byp. / SR 12 in Warrenton	US 278 / US 278 Byp. / SR 12 / SR 80 / SR 80 Alt. in Warrenton	1989	current	Also signed as SR 12 Truck at intersections; completely concurrent with US 278 Byp., which is also signed as US 278 Truck
SR 12 Conn.	—	—	SR 16 southwest of Warrenton	US 278 / SR 12 in Warrenton	1973	1989	Temporary redesignation of SR 16
SR 13 Conn.	1.1	1.8	US 23 / SR 13 in Doraville	SR 141 in Doraville	1971	current	Formerly part of SR 13W
SR 13 Spur	—	—	US 23 / SR 13 / SR 20 in Buford	US 23 / SR 13 southwest of Rest Haven	1946	1964	Redesignated as SR 13 Loop
SR 13 Loop	—	—	SR 13 in Buford	SR 13 southwest of Rest Haven	1964	1990	Formerly SR 13 Spur
SR 13 Conn.	—	—	SR 13 east-northeast of Flowery Branch	SR 53 north-northwest of Chestnut Mountain	1970	1980	
SR 13 Conn.	—	—	US 23 / SR 13 in Gainesville	US 129 / SR 11 in Gainesville	1963	1969	Redesignated as SR 11 Conn.
SR 13 Conn.	—	—	US 123 / SR 13 / SR 184 south-southwest of Toccoa	SR 17 southeast of Toccoa	1986	1991	Redesignated as a southern rerouting of SR 17
SR 14 Alt.	—	—	US 29 / SR 14 / SR 109 in LaGrange	US 27 / US 29 / US 29 Bus. / SR 1 / SR 14 / SR 14 Conn. / SR 109 / SR 219 in LaGrange	1965	1976	Redesignated as a southern re-routing of US 29 / SR 14 / SR 109
SR 14 Conn.	—	—	US 27 / US 29 / US 29 Bus. / SR 1 / SR 14 / SR 14 Alt. / SR 109 / SR 219 in LaGrange	US 29 / US 29 Bus. / SR 14 in LaGrange	1965	1976	Was completely concurrent with US 29 Bus.
SR 14 Conn.	1.1	1.8	US 29 / SR 14 / SR 109 in LaGrange	US 27 / US 29 / SR 1 / SR 14 / SR 219 in LaGrange	1994	current	Formerly part of US 29 / SR 14 / SR 109
SR 14 Spur	5.0	8.0	SR 219 in LaGrange	US 29 / SR 14 in LaGrange	1971	current	
SR 14 Alt.	13.7	22.0	US 29 / US 29 Alt. / SR 14 / SR 154 in Palmetto	US 29 Alt. / SR 14 Conn. in Red Oak	2007	current	Completely concurrent with US 29 Alt.
SR 14 Spur	—	—	US 29 / SR 14 southwest of Red Oak	US 29 / SR 14 in College Park	1963	2007	Redesignated as SR 14 Conn.
SR 14 Conn.	2.8	4.5	US 29 / US 29 Alt. / SR 14 / SR 14 Alt. in Red Oak	I-85 / I-285 / SR 139 / SR 403 / SR 407 in College Park	2007	current	
SR 15 Conn.	—	—	SR 16 northeast of Sparta	SR 15 / SR 22 north of Sparta	1950	1957	Redesignated as part of SR 15
SR 15 Spur	—	—	US 441 / SR 15 in Athens	US 129 / SR 15 in Athens	1952	1953	
SR 15 Alt.	31.6	50.9	US 29 / US 78 / US 129 / US 441 / SR 8 / SR 10 Loop / SR 15 in Athens	US 441 / US 441 Bus. / SR 15 / SR 59 in Commerce	1965	current	Temporarily traveled on US 441 between Athens and Commerce
SR 15 Spur	—	—	US 441 / SR 15 northeast of Commerce	SR 59 northeast of Commerce	1957	1981	Redesignated as part of SR 59
SR 15 Spur	—	—	US 441 / SR 15 in Baldwin	US 23 / SR 13 in Baldwin	1950	1972	Redesignated as SR 15 Conn.
SR 15 Conn.	—	—	US 441 / SR 15 in Baldwin	US 23 / SR 13 in Baldwin	1972	1981	Formerly SR 15 Spur; redesignated as part of US 441 / SR 15
SR 15 Loop	—	—	US 23 / US 23 Bus. / US 441 / US 441 Bus. / SR 13 / SR 15 / SR 105 in Baldwin	US 23 / US 23 Bus. / US 441 / US 441 Bus. / SR 15 / SR 105 north-northwest of Cornelia	1971	1972	Formerly part of US 23 / US 441 / SR 15; redesignated as SR 105; was completely concurrent with US 23 Bus. / US 441 Bus.
SR 15 Alt.	—	—	US 23 Bus. / US 441 Bus. / SR 15 Loop in Cornelia	US 23 Bus. / US 441 Bus. / SR 15 Loop in Cornelia	1965	1972	Redesignated as SR 105 Alt.
SR 15 Conn.	—	—	US 23 Bus. / US 441 Bus. / SR 15 Loop in Cornelia	SR 15 Alt. in Cornelia	1965	1972	Redesignated as SR 105 Conn.
SR 15 Conn.	0.7	1.1	Alpine Court Circle west of Cornelia	US 441 / SR 15 in Cornelia	1994	current	
SR 15 Spur	—	—	SR 15 Alt. in Cornelia	US 23 Bus. / US 441 Bus. / SR 15 Loop in Cornelia	1965	1972	Redesignated as SR 105 Spur
SR 15 Conn.	—	—	US 23 / US 441 / SR 15 in Clarkesville	US 23 / US 441 / SR 115 / SR 197 in Clarkesville	1975	1994	Redesignated as SR 197 Conn.
SR 15 Spur	—	—	US 23 / US 441 / SR 15 in Chattahoochee-Oconee National Forest	US 23 / US 441 / SR 15 in Tallulah Falls	1946	1980	
SR 15 Loop	1.2	1.9	US 23 / US 441 / SR 15 in Tallulah Falls	US 23 / US 441 / SR 15 in Tallulah Falls	1987	current	Formerly part of US 23 / US 441 / SR 15
SR 16 Spur	—	—	SR 16 in Warrenton	SR 16 in Warrenton	1957	1990	Was truncated to SR 16 in southwestern part of Warrenton
SR 16 Conn.	—	—	SR 16 southeast of Warrenton	SR 17 north-northwest of Wrens	1952	1981	Formerly part of SR 16
SR 16 Conn.	—	—	SR 16 southeast of Warrenton	SR 17 north-northwest of Wrens	1982	1989	Redesignated as SR 17 Conn.
SR 16 Conn.	—	—	US 1 / SR 4 / SR 17 north of Louisville	SR 17 northwest of Wrens	1952	1953	Formerly part of SR 16; redesignated as SR 296
SR 17 Conn.	3.6	5.8	I-16 / SR 404 in Bloomingdale	US 80 / SR 17 / SR 26 in Bloomingdale	2020	current	Follows the old mainline of SR 17 before the mainline was shifted to continue southeast on Jimmy DeLoach Parkway in February 2020
SR 17 Byp.	1.5	2.4	SR 17 south of Millen	US 25 / SR 17 / SR 23 / SR 67 / SR 121 in Millen	—	—	
SR 17 Conn.	7.3	11.7	SR 17 north-northwest of Wrens	SR 80 southeast of Warrenton	—	—	
SR 17 Byp.	7.4	11.9	SR 17 south of Thomson	US 78 / SR 10 / SR 17 north of Thomson	—	—	
SR 17 Bus.	2.7	4.3	US 78 / US 78 Bus. / US 378 / SR 10 / SR 10 Bus. / SR 17 / SR 47 in Washington	SR 17 north of Washington	—	—	
SR 17 Bus.	2.2	3.5	SR 17 south of Royston	SR 17 in Royston	—	—	
SR 17 Alt.	19.4	31.2	SR 17 in Toccoa	US 441 Bus. / SR 17 / SR 115 / SR 197 / SR 385 in Clarkesville	—	—	
SR 18 Spur	—	—	SR 18 in Gordon	SR 243 in Gordon	1965	2012	
SR 19 Bus.	—	—	US 23 / US 23 Bus. / SR 19 in Hazlehurst	US 23 / US 23 Bus. / US 221 / US 341 / SR 19 / SR 27 / SR 135 in Hazlehurst	1986	1995	Formerly part of US 23 / SR 19; partially redesignated as SR 135 Conn.; was completely concurrent with US 23 Bus.
SR 19 Conn.	0.2	0.32	US 221 / SR 135 in Hazlehurst	US 23 / US 341 / SR 19 / SR 27 in Hazlehurst	2008	current	
SR 19 Spur	—	—	US 23 / SR 87 north-northwest of Macon	US 41 / SR 19 southeast of Bolingbroke	1965	1977	Formerly part of SR 148
SR 20 Spur	—	—	US 41 / US 411 / SR 3 / SR 20 northwest of Cartersville	US 411 / SR 20 / SR 61 in Cartersville	1940	1943	Redesignated as part of SR 20
SR 20 Spur	4.264	6.862	SR 20 in Cartersville	Allatoona Dam east of Cartersville	—	—	
SR 20 Conn.	—	—	SR 20 in Sugar Hill	US 23 / SR 13 south of Buford	1953	1954	Redesignated as part of SR 20
SR 20 Spur	—	—	SR 20 in Sugar Hill	SR 13 Spur in Buford	1966	1991	
SR 20 Spur	—	—	SR 20 in Loganville	US 78 / SR 10 / SR 81 in Loganville	1948	1982	Redesignated as part of SR 81
SR 21 Spur	1.2	1.9	SR 21 in Garden City	Georgia Ports Authority's Gate #2; entrance to GAF Materials Corporation east of Garden City	1960	current	
SR 21 Alt.	3.5	5.6	SR 21 / SR 307 in Garden City	SR 17 / SR 21 / SR 30 in Port Wentworth	2017	current	Completed in 2016 as the Jimmy DeLoach Connector, an eastern extension of Jimmy DeLoach Parkway
SR 21 Spur	—	—	SR 21 / SR 30 north-northwest of Industrial City Gardens	US 17 / SR 25 north of Industrial City Gardens	1946	1960	
SR 21 Bus.	2.1	3.4	SR 21 in Springfield	SR 21 Spur / SR 119 in Springfield	2009	current	
SR 21 Spur	0.5	0.80	SR 119 in Springfield	SR 21 north-northwest of Springfield	2009	current	
SR 21 Bus.	1.7	2.7	SR 21 southeast of Newington	SR 21 in Newington	2010	current	Formerly part of SR 21
SR 21 Bus.	2.9	4.7	SR 21 southeast of Sylvania	US 301 / SR 21 / SR 73 Loop in Sylvania	1993	current	Formerly part of SR 21
SR 21 Conn.	—	—	SR 21 / SR 73 in Sylvania	US 301 Bus. / SR 73 in Sylvania	2009	2012	
SR 22 Conn.	0.3	0.48	SR 85 in Columbus	US 80 / SR 22 in Columbus	1985	current	
SR 22 Spur	10.3	16.6	US 27 / SR 1 in Columbus	US 80 / SR 22 in Columbus	1965	current	Partially formerly SR 22
SR 22 Spur	—	—	US 19 / SR 3 southwest of Salem	US 80 / SR 22 in Salem	1963	1999	
SR 22 Conn.	—	—	US 80 / SR 22 east-southeast of Lizella	SR 74 in Macon	1967	1981	Was completely concurrent with US 80
SR 22 Conn.	—	—	US 441 / SR 24 Conn. / SR 29 in Milledgeville	SR 22 / SR 24 / SR 24 Conn. / SR 49 in Milledgeville	1971	1995	Was completely concurrent with SR 24 Conn.; partially redesignated as a northern extension of SR 112
SR 23 Conn.	—	—	SR 23 in Glennville	US 25 / US 301 / SR 73 in Glennville	1949	1985	
SR 23 Spur	0.0894	0.1439	SR 23 in Twin City	SR 192 in Twin City	1952	current	Northern terminus formerly at US 80 / SR 26
SR 24 Spur	—	—	Downtown Davisboro	SR 24 in Davisboro	1940	1943	Redesignated as part of SR 231
SR 24 Spur	—	—	SR 24 west of Sandersville	SR 15 in Sandersville	1993	2009	Redesignated as SR 242 Spur
SR 24 Spur	2.7	4.3	SR 24 / SR 68 west of Sandersville	Deepstep Road in Sandersville	1987	current	
SR 24 Conn.	—	—	US 441 / SR 22 Conn. / SR 29 in Milledgeville	SR 22 / SR 22 Conn. / SR 24 / SR 49 in Milledgeville	1971	1995	Was completely concurrent with SR 22 Conn.; partially redesignated as a northern extension of SR 112
SR 24 Bus.	3.8	6.1	US 129 / US 129 Bus. / US 441 / US 441 Bus. / SR 24 / SR 44 in Eatonton	US 129 / US 129 Bus. / US 441 / US 441 Bus. / SR 24 in Eatonton	1992	current	Formerly part of US 129 / US 441 / SR 24; completely concurrent with US 129 Bus. / US 441 Bus.
SR 24 Byp.	4.2	6.8	US 129 / US 129 Byp. / US 441 / US 441 Byp. / SR 24 in Madison	US 129 / US 129 Byp. / US 278 / US 441 / US 441 Byp. / SR 12 / SR 24 northeast of Madison	1992	current	Was proposed in 1988; completely concurrent with US 129 Byp. / US 441 Byp.
SR 24 Spur	0.4	0.64	US 129 / US 278 Truck / US 441 / SR 12 Truck / SR 24 in Madison	US 278 / US 278 Truck / SR 12 / SR 12 Truck / SR 83 in Madison	1946	current	Completely concurrent with US 278 Truck / SR 12 Truck
SR 24 Bus.	3.0	4.8	US 129 / US 129 Bus. / US 441 / US 441 Bus. / SR 24 southwest of Watkinsville	US 129 / US 129 Bus. / US 441 / US 441 Bus. / SR 15 / SR 24 north of Watkinsville	1997	current	Formerly part of SR 15; completely concurrent with US 129 Bus. / US 441 Bus.
SR 24 Conn.	—	—	US 441 / SR 24 / SR 98 in Commerce	US 441 / SR 15 / SR 24 Conn. / SR 98 in Commerce	1960	1965	Was completely concurrent with US 441 / SR 98 and SR 15 (before SR 15 and SR 24 were swapped between June 1960 and June 1963
SR 24 Spur	—	—	US 441 / SR 15 / SR 24 Spur / SR 98 in Commerce	SR 59 Conn. / SR 98 in Commerce	1960	1965	Was completely concurrent with SR 98
SR 25 Spur	2.79	4.49	I-95 / SR 405 in Woodbine	US 17 / SR 25 in Woodbine	1977	current	
SR 25 Spur	—	—	SR 50 south-southeast of Brunswick	US 17 / SR 25 in Brunswick	1949	1960	Redesignated as part of US 17 / US 84 / SR 25
SR 25 Conn.	1.08	1.74	US 17 / US 25 / SR 25 in Brunswick	US 25 / US 341 / SR 27 in Brunswick	1965	current	Completely concurrent with US 25
SR 25 Spur	4.13	6.65	US 17 / SR 25 in Brunswick	Kings Way / Demere Road / Sea Island Road in St. Simons Island	2004	current	SR 25 Spur is the F.J. Torras Causeway.
SR 25 Spur	7.5	12.1	US 17 / SR 25 in Brunswick	I-95 / SR 405 in Dock Junction	1974	current	Was proposed in 1971
SR 25 Spur	—	—	US 17 / SR 25 in Darien	Fort King George east of Darien	1946	2002	
SR 25 Spur	—	—	US 17 / SR 25 / SR 26 Loop in Savannah	US 17 / US 80 / SR 25 / SR 26 in Savannah	1948	1969	Was completely concurrent with US 17 Alt. and, later, the southbound lanes of US 17
SR 25 Conn.	3.11	5.01	I-516 / US 80 / SR 21 / SR 25 / SR 26 / SR 421 in Savannah	US 17 / SR 404 Spur in Savannah	1991	current	Formerly part of US 17 / US 80 / SR 21 / SR 25 / SR 26 and, later US 17 Alt. / SR 25 Alt.
SR 25 Spur	—	—	US 17 / US 80 / SR 25 / SR 26 in Savannah	Georgia Ports Authority in Savannah	1966	1986	
SR 25 Alt.	—	—	I-516 / US 17 / US 17 Alt. / US 80 / SR 21 / SR 25 / SR 26 in Savannah	US 17 Alt. at the South Carolina state line in Savannah	1955	1995	Was completely concurrent with US 17 Alt.
SR 26 Spur	—	—	US 129 / US 341 / SR 27 / SR 230 / SR 257 in Hawkinsville	US 129 / US 341 / SR 26 in Hawkinsville	1965	1991	Redesignated as US 341 Truck/SR 230 Truck
SR 26 Conn.	—	—	US 129 / US 341 / SR 26 / SR 27 / SR 257/ in Hartford	US 341 / SR 27 in Hartford	1965	1991	Was completely concurrent with US 341 / SR 27
SR 26 Conn.	0.1	0.16	US 80 / SR 26 in Garden City	I-516 / SR 21 / SR 25 / SR 421 in Garden City	1985	current	
SR 26 Loop	8.5	13.7	Augusta Avenue in Savannah	La Roche Avenue in Savannah	1966	1978	Redesignated as part of SR 21
SR 26 Conn.	—	—	US 17 / SR 25 in Savannah	US 17 / SR 25 in Savannah	1969	1985	
SR 26 Loop	—	—	US 80 / SR 26 in Whitemarsh Island	US 80 / SR 26 in Wilmington Island	1965	1969	Redesignated as SR 367
SR 26 Spur	—	—	US 80 / SR 26 in Savannah Beach US 80 / SR 26 in Savannah Beach	US 80 / SR 26 in Savannah Beach SR 26 Loop in Savannah Beach	1965	1969	
SR 26 Loop	—	—	US 80 / SR 26 in Savannah Beach	US 80 / SR 26 in Savannah Beach	1965	1969	Redesignated as SR 26E
SR 27 Bus.	3.9	6.3	US 341 / US 341 Bus. / SR 27 / SR 46 west of Eastman	US 23 / US 341 / US 341 Bus. / SR 27 in Eastman	1993	current	Completely concurrent with US 341 Bus.
SR 27 Loop	—	—	US 23 / US 341 / SR 27 in Helena	US 23 / US 341 / SR 27 southeast of McRae	1977	1987	
SR 27 Alt.	—	—	US 23 / US 341 / SR 27 in Jesup	US 23 / US 25 / US 301 / US 341 / SR 23 / SR 27 in Jesup	1963	1989	Mostly redesignated as a northeastern relocation of US 23 / US 341 / SR 27
SR 27 Spur	—	—	Dead end in Brunswick	US 84 / US 341 / SR 27 in Brunswick	1965	1981	
SR 29 Bus.	7.1	11.4	US 441 / US 441 Bus. / SR 29 in Scottsboro	US 441 / US 441 Bus. / SR 24 / SR 29 in Milledgeville	2016	current	Most of path was formerly SR 243; completely concurrent with US 441 Bus.
SR 29 Spur	—	—	Vinson Highway in Milledgeville	US 441 / SR 29 in Milledgeville	1946	1960	Redesignated as SR 112 Spur
SR 30 Conn.	—	—	SR 215 in Pitts	US 280 / SR 30 / SR 215 east of Pitts	1965	1997	Cleveland Avenue
SR 31 Conn.	—	—	US 129 / SR 11 / SR 37 / SR 122 in Lakeland	US 129 / US 221 / SR 11 / SR 31 / SR 37 / SR 122 / SR 135 in Lakeland	1965	1980	Was completely concurrent with US 129 / SR 11 / SR 37 / SR 122
SR 31 Conn.	0.4	0.64	US 221 / SR 31 south of Lakeland	SR 135 south of Lakeland	2009	current	
SR 31 Truck	—	—	US 221 / US 221 Truck / US 441 / US 441 Truck / SR 31 / SR 135 / SR 135 Truck / SR 158 Truck / SR 206 in Douglas	US 221 / US 221 Truck / US 441 / US 441 Truck / SR 135 Truck / SR 158 Truck / SR 206 Conn. / SR 206 Truck in Douglas	—	—	
SR 31 Spur	—	—	SR 135 in Douglas	US 221 / US 441 / SR 31 in Douglas	1965	1968	
SR 32 Truck	2.6	4.2	US 19 / US 19 Byp. / SR 3 / SR 3 Byp. / SR 32 in Leesburg	SR 32 east of Leesburg	—	—	
SR 32 Conn.	0.041	0.066	US 41 / SR 7 in Sycamore	SR 32 in Sycamore	1967	current	
SR 32 Truck	—	—	US 221 Truck / US 441 Truck / SR 31 Truck / SR 32 / SR 135 Truck / SR 158 Truck / SR 206 in Douglas	US 221 / SR 32 / SR 135 / SR 135 Truck / SR 158 Truck in Douglas	—	—	
SR 32 Conn.	—	—	SR 32 in Patterson	US 82 / SR 38 in Patterson	1973	1978	
SR 33 Conn.	1.8	2.9	SR 33 in Wenona	I-75 / SR 401 east of Wenona	1978	current	
SR 34 Byp.	—	—	US 27 / SR 1 / SR 100 in Franklin	SR 34 in Franklin	1949	1983	
SR 34 Byp.	6.0	9.7	SR 34 west of Newnan	SR 34 in Newnan	1989	current	Was proposed as SR 747; later proposed as SR 34 Byp.; later re-proposed as SR 747; later partially completed as SR 747
SR 35 Bus.	—	—	US 319 / SR 35 in Thomasville	US 319 / SR 35 northeast of Thomasville	—	2007	Partially redesignated as SR 35 Conn.
SR 35 Conn.	1.1	1.8	US 19 / US 84 / SR 3 / SR 38 / SR 300 in Thomasville	US 319 / SR 35 northeast of Thomasville	—	—	
SR 35 Loop	0.4	0.64	US 319 / SR 35 west of Phillipsburg	I-75 / Old Omega Road / Magnolia Drive on the Phillipsburg–Tifton line	—	—	
SR 37 Conn.	0.3	0.48	SR 37 in Camilla	SR 112 in Camilla	—	—	
SR 37 Truck	1.0	1.6	SR 37 in Camilla	US 19 / SR 3 / SR 37 / SR 300 in Camilla	—	—	
SR 37 Conn.	0.3	0.48	US 129 / SR 11 / SR 37 east of Lakeland	US 129 / SR 11 east of Lakeland	2009	current	
SR 38 Bus.	2.7	4.3	US 27 / US 84 / US 84 Bus. / SR 1 / SR 38 / SR 97 Conn. in Bainbridge	US 84 / US 84 Bus. / SR 38 in Bainbridge	—	—	Completely concurrent with US 84 Bus.
SR 38 Loop	—	—	—	—	—	—	
SR 38 Spur	0.9	1.4	SR 93 / SR 111 in Cairo	US 84 / SR 38 in Cairo	—	—	
SR 38 Bus.	4.8	7.7	US 84 / US 84 Bus. / US 319 / SR 3 Alt. / SR 35 / SR 38 north of Thomasville	US 19 / US 84 / US 84 Bus. / SR 3 / SR 38 / SR 300 east of Thomasville	—	—	Completely concurrent with US 84 Bus.
SR 38 Conn.	—	—	—	—	—	—	
SR 38 Conn.	—	—	—	—	—	—	
SR 38 Spur	—	—	—	—	—	—	
SR 38 Loop	—	—	—	—	—	—	
SR 38 Conn.	1.7	2.7	SR 119 on the Hinesville–Fort Stewart line	US 84 / SR 38 / SR 196 in Hinesville	—	—	
SR 39 Spur	—	—	—	—	—	—	
SR 39 Conn.	15.7	25.3	SR 39 south-southwest of Omaha	SR 1 Conn. in Lumpkin	—	—	
SR 39 Spur	1.5	2.4	SR 208 at the Alabama state line west-southwest of Omaha	SR 39 southwest of Omaha	—	—	
SR 40 Conn.	1.33	2.14	US 1 / US 23 / US 301 / SR 4 / SR 15 / SR 23 / SR 121 in Folkston	SR 40 in Folkston	2005	current	
SR 40 Spur	6.58	10.59	SR 40 in St. Marys	Crooked River State Park north of St. Marys	1941	current	
SR 41 Conn.	0.2	0.32	SR 26 in Buena Vista	SR 41 / SR 137 in Buena Vista	—	—	
SR 42 Spur	—	—	—	—	—	—	
SR 42 Conn.	0.8	1.3	SR 10 in Atlanta	US 23 / SR 42 in Atlanta	—	—	
SR 42 Spur	2.4	3.9	SR 54 in Atlanta	US 23 / SR 42	—	—	
SR 43 Byp.	—	—	SR 43 / SR 47 in Lincolnton	US 378 / SR 43 in Lincolnton	1970	2016	Formerly SR 43 Spur
SR 43 Conn.	—	—	SR 47 east of Lincolnton	US 378 / SR 43 northeast of Lincolnton	1999	current	
SR 43 Spur	—	—	SR 43 / SR 47 in Lincolnton	US 378 / SR 43 in Lincolnton	1965	1970	Redesignated as SR 43 Byp.
SR 44 Spur	2.0	3.2	SR 44 southwest of Washington	SR 47 south of Washington	—	—	
SR 45 Conn.	0.5	0.80	SR 310 in Colquitt	SR 45 / SR 91 in Colquitt	—	—	
SR 45 Truck	1.6	2.6	US 27 / SR 1 / SR 45 / SR 91 / SR 91 Truck in Colquitt	SR 45 / SR 91 in Colquitt	—	—	
SR 45 Alt.	0.4	0.64	SR 45 / SR 45 Truck / SR 62 / SR 62 Truck / SR 216 / SR 216 Truck in Arlington	SR 45 / SR 45 Truck in Arlington	—	—	Completely concurrent with SR 45 Truck
SR 45 Truck	0.4	0.64	SR 45 / SR 45 Alt. / SR 62 / SR 62 Truck / SR 216 / SR 216 Truck in Arlington	SR 45 / SR 45 Alt. in Arlington	—	—	Completely concurrent with SR 45 Alt.
SR 46 Conn.	0.0765	0.1231	SR 47 in Eastman	SR 117 in Eastman	—	—	
SR 47 Conn.	0.1	0.16	US 78 / SR 10 / SR 17 southeast of Washington	US 378 / SR 47 southeast of Washington	—	—	
SR 49 Byp.	—	—	SR 49 / SR 49 Conn. northeast of Fort Valley	SR 96 east of Fort Valley	proposed	—	
SR 49 Conn.	4.7	7.6	SR 96 west of Fort Valley	SR 49 northeast of Fort Valley	—	—	
SR 49 Truck	—	—	—	—	—	—	
SR 50 Spur	—	—	Shellman	SR 50 north of Shellman	1937	1937	Redesignated as part of SR 41
SR 50 Spur	—	—	US 82 / SR 50 in Albany	US 19 / SR 3W in Albany	1963	1980	
SR 50 Conn.	—	—	US 19 / US 82 / SR 3 / SR 50 / SR 234 in Albany	US 82 / SR 50 in Albany	1973	1980	
SR 50 Bus.	—	—	US 19 / US 82 / SR 3 / SR 50 / SR 234 in Albany	US 82 / SR 50 in Albany	1980	1988	Formerly part of SR 50; redesignated as SR 520 Bus.
SR 50 Conn.	—	—	SR 50 in Jekyll Island	SR 50 in Jekyll Island	1973	1981	
SR 51 Spur	—	—	SR 51 in Reed Creek	Reed Creek	1968	1983	
SR 52 Bus.	—	—	—	—	—	—	
SR 52 Alt.	5.320	8.562	US 76 / SR 52 west of Chatsworth	US 76 / US 411 / SR 2 / SR 52 / SR 61 in Chatsworth	—	—	
SR 52 Bus.	—	—	—	—	—	—	
SR 53 Spur	—	—	—	—	—	—	
SR 53 Conn.	—	—	—	—	—	—	
SR 53 Spur	2.930	4.715	SR 53 southwest of Calhoun	US 41 / SR 3 in Calhoun	—	—	
SR 53 Bus.	6.434	10.355	SR 53 / SR 53 in Tate	SR 5 / SR 53 / SR 515 in Jasper	—	—	
SR 53 Conn.	1.790	2.881	SR 53 in Gainesville	I-985 / US 23 / SR 60 / SR 365 / SR 419 in Gainesville	—	—	
SR 54 Alt.	—	—	—	—	—	—	
SR 54 Conn.	0.7	1.1	SR 54 in Atlanta	SR 42 Spur in Atlanta	—	—	
SR 54 Conn.	2.2	3.5	SR 54 in Forest Park	US 23 / SR 42 northeast of Conley	1995	current	Formerly part of SR 160
SR 54 Spur	0.2	0.32	US 27 Alt. / SR 41 in Luthersville	SR 54 in Luthersville	—	—	
SR 55 Bus.	2.3	3.7	US 27 / US 280 / SR 1 / SR 55 in Cusseta	US 280 / SR 55 in Cusseta	1972	1988	
SR 55 Spur	—	—	—	—	—	—	
SR 56 Spur	—	—	—	—	—	—	
SR 56 Conn.	—	—	—	—	—	—	
SR 56 Spur	6.7	10.8	SR 56 south of Augusta	SR 80 northeast of Shell Bluff	—	—	
SR 56 Conn.	—	—	—	—	—	—	
SR 56 Loop	—	—	—	—	—	—	
SR 56 Spur	6.6	10.6	SR 56 in Augusta	US 1 / US 25 / US 78 / US 278 / SR 10 / SR 121 in Augusta	—	—	
SR 57 Conn.	—	—	US 1 Bus. / SR 4 Bus. in Swainsboro	US 80 / SR 26 / SR 56 in Swainsboro	—	—	
SR 59 Conn.	—	—	—	—	—	—	
SR 59 Spur	—	—	—	—	—	—	
SR 59 Conn.	—	—	—	—	—	—	
SR 60 Conn.	0.2	0.32	SR 60 in Gainesville	SR 11 Bus. in Gainesville	—	—	
SR 60 Bus.	—	—	US 19 / US 19 Bus. / SR 9 / SR 52 / SR 60 in Dahlonega	US 19 / US 19 Bus. / SR 9 / SR 60 north of Dahlonega	—	—	Completely concurrent with US 19 Bus.
SR 60 Spur	7.5	12.1	SR 60 in Mineral Bluff	NC 60 at the North Carolina state line southwest of Culberson, North Carolina	—	—	
SR 61 Conn.	—	—	—	—	—	—	
SR 61 Conn.	—	—	—	—	—	—	
SR 61 Spur	—	—	—	—	—	—	
SR 62 Byp.	4.5	7.2	SR 62 in Blakely	SR 62 in Blakely	—	—	
SR 62 Truck	0.2	0.32	SR 45 / SR 45 Alt. / SR 45 Truck / SR 62 / SR 216 / SR 216 Truck in Arlington	SR 45 Alt. / SR 45 Truck / SR 62 / SR 216 Truck in Arlington	—	—	Completely concurrent with SR 45 Alt./SR 45 Truck/SR 216 Truck
SR 63 Spur	—	—	SR 63 southeast of Richmond Hill	Fort McAllister	1966	1967	Redesignated SR 67 Spur
SR 66 Spur	—	—	—	—	—	—	
SR 67 Spur	—	—	SR 67 southeast of Richmond Hill	Fort McAllister	1967	1974	Formerly SR 63 Spur; redesignated SR 144
SR 67 Conn.	—	—	—	—	—	—	
SR 67 Loop	—	—	—	—	—	—	
SR 67 Byp.	7.3	11.7	US 301 Byp. / SR 67 / SR 73 Byp. in Statesboro	US 25 / US 25 Byp. / US 80 / SR 26 / SR 67 northwest of Statesboro	—	—	
SR 71 Conn.	—	—	—	—	—	—	
SR 73 Byp.	—	—	US 25 / US 301 / SR 23 in Glennville	US 25 / US 301 / SR 73 north of Glennville	1946	1985	
SR 73 Byp.	6.9	11.1	US 25 / US 25 Byp. / US 301 / US 301 Byp. / SR 67 Byp. / SR 73 in Statesboro	US 301 / US 301 Byp. / SR 73 in Statesboro	1993	current	Completely concurrent with US 301 Byp.
SR 73 Loop	3.0	4.8	US 301 / SR 21 / SR 73 southwest of Sylvania	US 301 / SR 73 in Sylvania	1970	current	Completely concurrent with US 301
SR 74 Alt.	1.5	2.4	SR 74 in Thomaston	SR 36 / SR 74 in Thomaston	—	—	
SR 74 Spur	—	—	—	—	—	—	
SR 75 Spur	0.7	1.1	US 129 / SR 11 in Cleveland	SR 75 in Cleveland	1960	1992	
SR 75 Alt.	11.1	17.9	US 129 / SR 11 / SR 75 in Cleveland	SR 17 / SR 75 in the Chattahoochee-Oconee National Forest	—	—	
SR 75 Conn.	1.3	2.1	US 129 / US 129 Byp. / SR 11 / SR 11 Byp. north-northwest of Cleveland	SR 75 north-northeast of Cleveland	2019	current	
SR 76 Conn.	—	—	—	—	—	—	
SR 77 Conn.	1.4	2.3	SR 17 / SR 72 in Elberton	SR 77 north of Elberton	—	—	Also signed as a truck route
SR 77 Spur	7.0	11.3	SR 77 southeast of Hartwell	SR 181 east-southeast of Hartwell	—	—	
SR 77 Conn.	5.2	8.4	SR 59 in Lavonia	SR 77 northeast of Bowersville	—	—	
SR 80 Alt.	—	—	SR 80 northeast of Waynesboro	Shore of Savannah River northeast of Waynesboro	1952	1953	
SR 80 Alt.	2.1	3.4	US 278 / US 278 Byp. / SR 12 / SR 12 Byp. / SR 80 in Warrenton	SR 80 northeast of Warrenton	—	—	
SR 80 Conn.	—	—	—	—	—	—	
SR 81 Loop	—	—	—	—	—	—	
SR 81 Spur	—	—	—	—	—	—	
SR 82 Conn.	4.7	7.6	SR 82 north of Jefferson	SR 98 in Maysville	—	—	
SR 82 Spur	—	—	—	—	—	—	
SR 83 Conn.	5.8	9.3	SR 83 southwest of Monticello	SR 16 east of Monticello	1983	1985	
SR 85 Alt.	18.7	30.1	US 27 Alt. / SR 85 / SR 116 south of Shiloh	SR 74 / SR 85 in Woodbury	1995	current	Formerly part of SR 85 and then SR 163
SR 85 Spur	0.8	1.3	SR 41 in Manchester	SR 85 in Manchester	1946	current	
SR 85 Conn.	—	—	—	—	—	—	
SR 87 Conn.	2.1	3.4	US 23 / SR 87 in Eastman	US 319 / SR 27 in Eastman	—	—	
SR 87 Alt.	—	—	—	—	—	—	
SR 87 Bus.	4.0	6.4	US 23 / US 23 Bus. / SR 87 in Cochran	US 23 / US 23 Bus. / US 129 Alt. / SR 87 / SR 112 north of Cochran	—	—	Completely concurrent with US 23 Bus.
SR 87 Spur	—	—	—	—	—	—	
SR 87 Conn.	0.2	0.32	US 23 / US 129 Alt. / SR 87 in East Macon	US 80 / SR 19 in East Macon	—	—	
SR 87 Spur	—	—	—	—	—	—	
SR 90 Spur	—	—	—	—	—	—	
SR 91 Alt.	1.9	3.1	SR 91 in Donalsonville	SR 91 in Donalsonville	1969	current	
SR 91 Truck	1.1	1.8	US 27 / SR 1 / SR 45 / SR 45 Truck / SR 91 in Colquitt	SR 45 Truck / SR 91 / SR 91 Spur in Colquitt	—	—	
SR 91 Spur	0.3	0.48	US 27 / SR 1 / SR 45 Truck / SR 91 Truck in Colquitt	SR 45 Truck / SR 91 / SR 91 Truck in Colquitt	1960	current	Completely concurrent with SR 45 Truck/SR 91 Truck
SR 92 Conn.	—	—	SR 92 northeast of Hiram	SR 92 Spur in New Hope	1969	1979	Formerly part of SR 176; redesignated as SR 120 Conn.
SR 92 Conn.	—	—	SR 6 / SR 61 / SR 120 in Dallas	SR 92 in Dallas	1946	1950	
SR 92 Spur	—	—	SR 6 / SR 61 / SR 120 in Dallas	SR 92 in Dallas	1952	1953	
SR 92 Spur	—	—	US 278 / SR 6 in Dallas	SR 92 in Cross Roads	1966	1979	Formerly SR 92; redesignated as SR 381
SR 97 Spur	3.5	5.6	SR 97 west-southwest of Faceville	Dead end at the shores of Lake Seminole	—	—	
SR 97 Conn.	1.4	2.3	SR 97 in Bainbridge	US 27 / US 84 / US 84 Bus. / SR 1 / SR 38 / SR 38 Bus. in Bainbridge	—	—	
SR 97 Byp.	—	—	—	—	—	—	
SR 98 Conn.	—	—	SR 98 southeast of Danielsville	US 29 / SR 8 / SR 8 Conn. in Danielsville	1946	1952	Formerly part of SR 36 and SR 98; extended through Danielsville, absorbing the entire length of SR 8 Conn.
SR 100 Spur	0.9	1.4	SR 100 in Tallapoosa	US 78 / SR 8 in Tallapoosa	—	—	
SR 102 Conn.	3.5	5.6	SR 248 in Hamburg	SR 102 in Agricola	1948	1954	Locally known as Hamburg-Agricola Road
SR 103 Spur	—	—	—	—	—	—	
SR 104 Conn.	0.6	0.97	SR 104 in Augusta	SR 28 in Augusta	—	—	
SR 105 Loop	—	—	—	—	—	—	
SR 105 Alt.	—	—	—	—	—	—	
SR 105 Conn.	—	—	—	—	—	—	
SR 105 Spur	—	—	—	—	—	—	
SR 107 Conn.	—	—	—	—	—	—	
SR 108 Conn.	—	—	SR 108 west of Tate	SR 53 / SR 53 Bus.	1977	1982	Formerly part of SR 143 and SR 379; redesignated as part of SR 108
SR 109 Spur	2.2	3.5	CR 278 at the Alabama state line west of Abbottsford	SR 109 south of Abbottsford	—	—	
SR 109 Spur	9.0	14.5	SR 18 / SR 109 in Greenville	SR 74 / SR 85 in Gay	—	—	
SR 112 Spur	0.3	0.48	SR 112 in Milledgeville	US 441 Bus. / SR 243 in Milledgeville	1960	1989	Formerly SR 29 Spur
SR 119 Conn.	6.0	9.7	SR 119 in Ivanhoe	US 80 / SR 26 west-southwest of Stilson	—	—	
SR 119 Spur	0.2	0.32	SR 119 in Ivanhoe	SR 119 Conn. in Ivanhoe	—	—	
SR 120 Conn.	7.4	11.9	SR 120 southwest of Dallas	SR 92 in Hiram	—	—	
SR 120 Conn.	—	—	SR 381 in New Hope	SR 120 in Lost Mountain	1979	1983	Formerly part of SR 176 and SR 92 Conn.
SR 120 Alt.	3.9	6.3	SR 5 / SR 120 in Marietta	SR 3 Conn. / SR 120 in Marietta	—	—	
SR 120 Loop	8.7	14.0	Beltway around Marietta		—	2007	
SR 121 Spur	—	—	Camp Cornelia on east side of Okefenokee Swamp southwest of Folkston	SR 23 / SR 121 south-southwest of Folkston	1976	1993	
SR 121 Byp.	5.7	9.2	US 25 / US 25 Byp. / SR 121 south of Waynesboro	US 25 / US 25 Byp. / SR 121 in Waynesboro	—	—	Completely concurrent with US 25 Byp.
SR 122 Conn.	0.7	1.1	SR 122 west of Lakeland	US 129 / SR 11 / SR 37 west of Lakeland	—	—	
SR 125 Conn.	—	—	—	—	—	—	
SR 128 Byp.	1.9	3.1	SR 128 southwest of Oglethorpe	SR 90 / SR 128 in Oglethorpe	—	—	
SR 128 Spur	—	—	—	—	—	—	
SR 133 Alt.	6.1	9.8	US 319 Bus. / SR 33 in Moultrie	SR 133 northwest of Moultrie	—	—	
SR 133 Conn.	—	—	—	—	—	—	
SR 135 Loop	2.5	4.0	SR 135 south of Lakeland	SR 135 south of Lakeland	—	—	Unsigned
SR 135 Byp.	1.6	2.6	SR 135 south of Lakeland	SR 135 in Lakeland	—	—	
SR 135 Conn.	—	—	—	—	—	—	
SR 135 Conn.	0.7	1.1	US 23 / US 221 Truck / SR 19 / SR 135 Truck south of Hazlehurst	US 221 / US 221 Truck / SR 135 / SR 135 Truck in Hazlehurst	—	—	Completely concurrent with US 221 Truck/SR 135 Truck
SR 135 Truck	2.0	3.2	US 221 / US 221 Truck / SR 135 / SR 135 Conn. in Hazlehurst	US 23 / US 221 / US 221 Truck / US 341 / SR 19 / SR 27 / SR 135 in Hazlehurst	—	—	Completely concurrent with US 221 Truck
SR 136 Conn.	9.567	15.397	SR 136 northwest of Sugar Valley	SR 53 Spur in Calhoun	1977	current	Formerly part of SR 53 and SR 143
SR 136 Conn.	2.653	4.270	SR 53 in Hinton	SR 136 in Blaine	1977	current	Formerly part of SR 156
SR 136 Spur	—	—	SR 53 in Dawsonville	SR 136 north-northwest of Dawsonville	1963	1982	
SR 137 Spur	1.6	2.6	SR 137 west of Cusseta	SR 355 west of Cusseta	1963	current	Formerly part of SR 103
SR 137 Loop	—	—	—	—	—	—	
SR 138 Spur	0.5	0.80	SR 138 northwest of Jonesboro	US 19 / US 41 / SR 3 / SR 54 in Jonesboro	—	—	
SR 138 Spur	—	—	—	—	—	—	
SR 141 Conn.	0.9	1.4	SR 141 in Atlanta	SR 237 in Atlanta	—	—	
SR 141 Conn.	0.8	1.3	SR 140 / SR 141 west of Norcross	SR 141 west of Norcross	—	—	
SR 141 Spur	—	—	—	—	—	—	
SR 143 Conn.	6.982	11.236	SR 143 northwest of Sugar Valley	US 41 / SR 3 in Resaca	1972	1977	
SR 144 Loop	—	—	—	—	—	—	
SR 144 Conn.	—	—	—	—	—	—	
SR 144 Spur	3.7	6.0	SR 144 southeast of Richmond Hill	Entrance road to Fort McAllister Historic State Park southeast of Richmond Hill	1974	current	Formerly part of SR 67 Spur
SR 149 Conn.	3.2	5.1	SR 149 southeast of McRae	US 319 / US 441 / SR 31 south of McRae	—	—	
SR 151 Spur	0.3	0.48	US 41 / US 41 Truck / US 76 / US 76 Truck / SR 2 / SR 3 in Ringgold	US 41 Truck / US 76 Truck / SR 151 in Ringgold	—	—	Completely concurrent with US 41 Truck/US 76 Truck
SR 154 Conn.	0.5	0.80	Glenwood Avenue in Atlanta	SR 154 in Atlanta	—	—	
SR 154 Spur	0.6	0.97	SR 154 southeast of Avondale Estates	US 278 / SR 12 southeast of Avondale Estates	—	—	
SR 158 Truck	—	—	SR 32 Truck / SR 158 / SR 206 in Douglas	US 221 / SR 32 Truck / SR 135 / SR 158 in Douglas	—	—	
SR 162 Conn.	—	—	—	—	—	—	
SR 166 Conn.	3.7	6.0	US 27 / SR 1 in Carrollton	SR 166 in Carrollton	2004	current	
SR 169 Spur	0.5	0.80	SR 169 north of Bellville	SR 129 north-northeast of Bellville	—	—	
SR 179 Conn.	—	—	US 27 / SR 1 east-southeast of Amsterdam	SR 111 / SR 179 in Calvary	1969	1987	
SR 180 Spur	2.5	4.0	SR 180 in Jacks Gap	Brasstown Bald Visitor Center in Chattahoochee-Oconee National Forest east of Blairsville	—	—	
SR 181 Spur	—	—	—	—	—	—	
SR 181 Conn.	—	—	—	—	—	—	
SR 192 Spur	—	—	SR 23 in Twin City	SR 192 northwest of Twin City	1974	2010	Formerly part of SR 192
SR 195 Conn.	—	—	—	—	—	—	
SR 196 Conn.	—	—	—	—	—	—	
SR 197 Conn.	0.058	0.093	US 441 Bus. / SR 385 in Clarkesville	SR 17 / SR 197 / SR 385 in Clarkesville	—	—	
SR 199 Spur	3.5	5.6	Troup Road / River Bend Road / Dead River Road west-southwest of Lothair	SR 199 in Lothair	—	—	
SR 204 Spur	7.2	11.6	SR 204 in Savannah	Green Island Road / McWhorter Drive / Tidewater Way in Skidaway Island	1989	2020	
SR 206 Conn.	1.6	2.6	SR 206 northwest of Douglas	US 221 / SR 135 northeast of Douglas	—	—	
SR 206 Spur	—	—	—	—	—	—	
SR 213 Spur	0.408	0.657	SR 213 in Pennington	SR 83 in Pennington	1963	1982	
SR 214 Byp.	—	—	SR 26 / SR 49 southwest of Oglethorpe	SR 214 / SR 214 Spur northwest of Oglethorpe	1965	1982	Redesignated as part of SR 128 Byp.
SR 214 Spur	—	—	SR 214 / SR 214 Byp. northwest of Oglethorpe	SR 90 / SR 128 in Oglethorpe	1965	1982	
SR 216 Truck	0.3	0.48	SR 45 / SR 45 Alt. / SR 45 Truck / SR 62 / SR 62 Truck / SR 216 in Arlington	SR 45 / SR 62 / SR 216 in Arlington	—	—	Completely concurrent with SR 45 Alt./SR 45 Truck/SR 62 Truck and SR 62
SR 220 Spur	—	—	—	—	—	—	
SR 230 Conn.	—	—	—	—	—	—	
SR 240 Conn.	1.9	3.1	SR 240 south-southwest of Mauk	SR 127 south-southwest of Mauk	—	—	
SR 240 Conn.	—	—	—	—	—	—	
SR 242 Spur	2.5	4.0	Kaolin Road / South Saffold Road in Sandersville	SR 242 west of Sandersville	—	—	
SR 247 Spur	3.1	5.0	US 341 / SR 11 southeast of Perry	US 129 / SR 247 east of Perry	—	—	
SR 247 Conn.	11.5	18.5	SR 49 in Powersville	US 129 / SR 247 in Warner Robins	—	—	
SR 253 Spur	1.1	1.8	SR 253 in Bainbridge	US 84 / SR 38 in Bainbridge	—	—	
SR 255 Alt.	3.3	5.3	SR 17 / SR 255 southeast of Sautee Nacoochee	SR 255 northeast of Sautee Nacoochee	—	—	
SR 270 Spur	0.7	1.1	SR 270 in Doerun	SR 133 in Doerun	1998	current	Formerly SR 363 Spur
SR 273 Spur	1.6	2.6	Georgia-Pacific plant entrance southwest of Liberty	SR 273 / SR 370 south-southeast of Liberty	1985	current	Formerly SR 363 Spur
SR 280 Conn.	—	—	—	—	—	—	
SR 293 Conn.	0.4	0.64	SR 293 south-southwest of Cassville	US 41 / SR 3 south-southwest of Cassville	—	—	
SR 300 Conn.	3.4	5.5	SR 300 southwest of Cordele	US 280 / SR 30 west of Cordele	—	—	
SR 302 Spur	1.1	1.8	SR 97 in Faceville	SR 302 southeast of Faceville	—	—	
SR 326 Conn.	—	—	—	—	—	—	
SR 333 Spur	—	—	SR 333 in Albany	Turner Field Road in Albany	proposed	—	Proposed
SR 355 Loop	0.5	0.80	SR 355 southwest of Juniper	SR 355 north-northeast of Juniper	1963	1970	
SR 363 Spur	—	—	Georgia-Pacific plant entrance southwest of Liberty	SR 273 / SR 363 south-southeast of Liberty	1967	1985	Redesignated as SR 273 Spur and part of SR 273
SR 365 Bus.	3.9	6.3	SR 60 / SR 369 / SR 53 Conn.	SR 60 / I-985	1991	1997	
SR 365 Spur	—	—	SR 365 west-northwest of Toccoa	US 23 / US 441 / SR 15 / SR 17 in Hollywood	proposed	—	Proposed in 1988; built in 1991, but as an eastern re-routing of SR 15 and maybe US 23
SR 369 Conn.	3.426	5.514	SR 369 in Matt	SR 9 in Silver City	—	1986	
SR 375 Conn.	—	—	SR 375 in Florence	Lumpkin	1972	1972	Redesignated as SR 39 Conn.; not on 1973 map due to short life
SR 402 Spur	—	—	—	—	—	—	
SR 403 Spur	—	—	—	—	—	—	
SR 404 Spur	3.07	4.94	I-16 / US 17 / SR 404 in Savannah	US 17 at the South Carolina state line north of Savannah	—	—	Completely concurrent with US 17
SR 407 Loop	—	—	I-285 / US 19 / SR 407 in Sandy Springs	I-285 in Sandy Springs	—	—	
SR 520 Bus.	2.3	3.7	US 27 / US 280 / SR 1 / SR 520 in Cusseta	US 280 / SR 520 in Cusseta	1988	2004	Formerly SR 55 Bus.
SR 520 Bus.	11.7	18.8	US 19 / US 19 Bus. / US 82 / US 82 Bus. / SR 3 / SR 520 in Albany	US 82 / US 82 Bus. / SR 520 east of Albany	—	—	Completely concurrent with US 82 Bus.
SR 701 Spur	—	—	Alabama state line west of Abbottsford	SR 701 in Abbottsford	1973	1975	
SR 713 Spur	—	—	SR 5 south of Nelson	I-575 / SR 5 / SR 713 west of Nelson	proposed	—	
SR 744 Spur	—	—	US 27 / SR 1 / SR 100 in Cedartown	SR 744 southeast of Cedartown	proposed	—	Built as a southern rerouting of US 278 / SR 6
SR 768 Spur	—	—	SR 768 north-northwest of Hiram	US 278 / SR 6 / SR 120 / SR 360 north-northwest of Hiram	proposed	—	Built as a rerouting of SR 120 / SR 360
Former; Proposed and unbuilt
