= Leary, Georgia =

Leary
- City
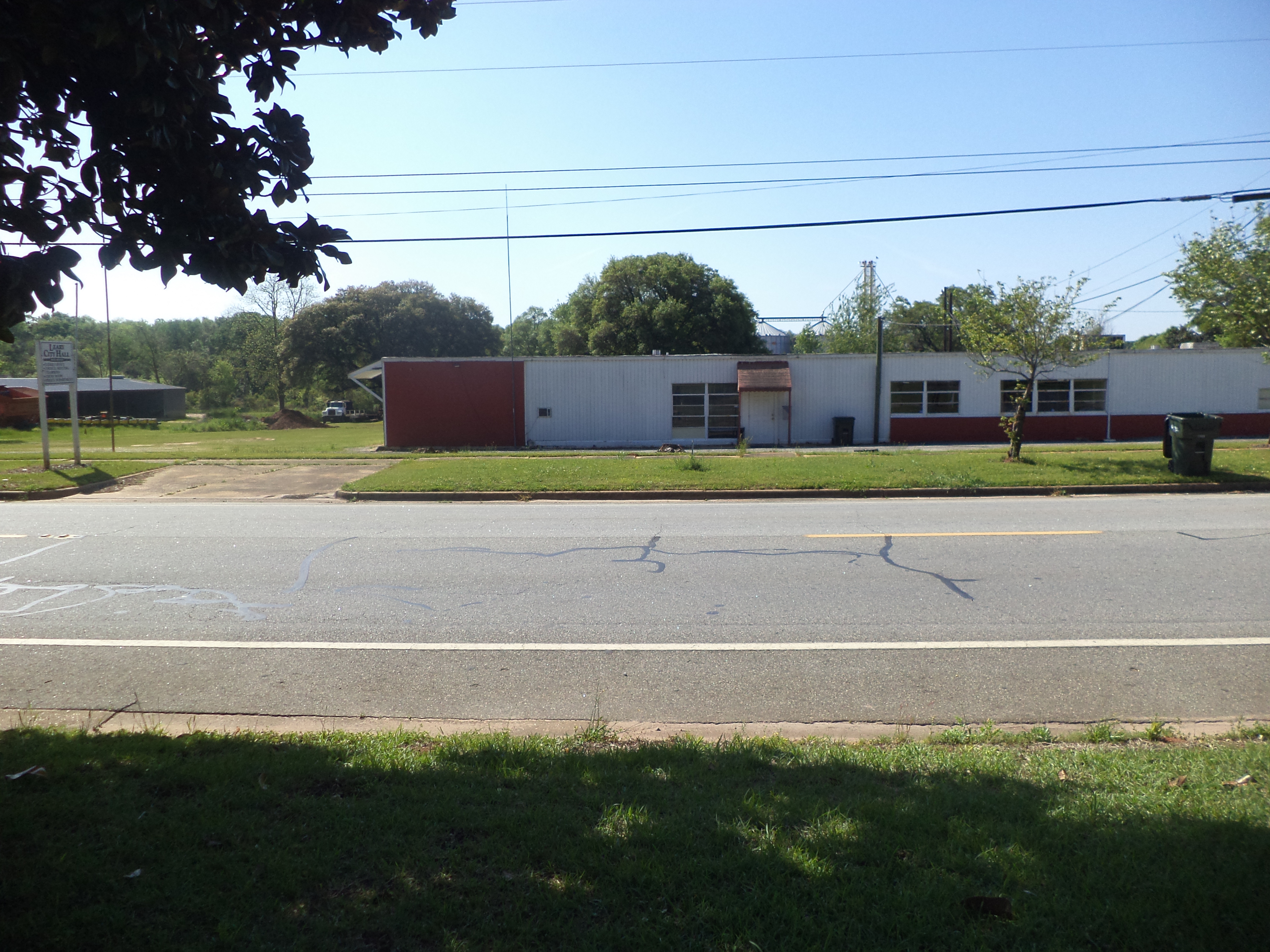
- Leary City Hall

- Location in Calhoun County and the state of Georgia
- Coordinates: 31°29′8″N 84°30′48″W
- Country: United States
- State: Georgia
- County: Calhoun

Area
  - Total: 3.22 sq mi (8.33 km^{2})
  - Land: 3.21 sq mi (8.31 km^{2})
  - Water: 0.0077 sq mi (0.02 km^{2})
- Elevation: 207 ft (63 m)

Population (2020)
  - Total: 524
  - Density: 163.4/sq mi (63.07/km^{2})
- Time zone: UTC-5 (Eastern (EST))
  - Summer (DST): UTC-4 (EDT)
- ZIP codes: 39862
- Area code: 229
- FIPS code: 13-45600
- GNIS feature ID: 0332194

Leary is a city in Calhoun County, Georgia, United States. The population was 524 in 2020.

== Geography ==
Leary is located in southeastern Calhoun County at 31°29′8″N 84°30′48″W (31.485431, -84.513293). It is 24 miles (39 km) southwest of Albany and 6 miles (10 km) southeast of Morgan, the county seat.

According to the United States Census Bureau, Leary has a total area of 3.2 square miles (8.3 km^{2}), of which 0.008 square miles (0.02 km^{2}), or 0.20%, is water.

== History ==
On October 2, 1916, a woman named Connelly, whose son was accused of murder, was taken from the Leary jail and lynched. Her body, riddled with bullets was found two days later.

== Demographics ==
Historical population
Census	Pop.	Note	%±
1880	304		—
1890	267		−12.2%
1900	396		48.3%
1910	430		8.6%
1920	465		8.1%
1930	531		14.2%
1940	717		35.0%
1950	721		0.6%
1960	848		17.6%
1970	907		7.0%
1980	783		−13.7%
1990	701		−10.5%
2000	666		−5.0%
2010	618		−7.2%
2020	524		−15.2%
U.S. Decennial Census; 1850-1870 1870-1880; 1890-1910 1920-1930; 1940 1950 1960; 1970 1980 1990; 2000 2010

=== Racial and ethnic composition ===
Leary city, Georgia – Racial and ethnic composition Note: the US Census treats Hispanic/Latino as an ethnic category. This table excludes Latinos from the racial categories and assigns them to a separate category. Hispanics/Latinos may be of any race.
Race / Ethnicity (NH = Non-Hispanic)	Pop 2000	Pop 2010	Pop 2020	% 2000	% 2010	% 2020
White alone (NH)	142	139	110	21.32%	22.49%	20.99%
Black or African American alone (NH)	500	466	401	75.08%	75.40%	76.53%
Native American or Alaska Native alone (NH)	5	0	3	0.75%	0.00%	0.57%
Asian alone (NH)	0	7	1	0.00%	1.13%	0.19%
Native Hawaiian or Pacific Islander alone (NH)	0	0	0	0.00%	0.00%	0.00%
Other race alone (NH)	0	1	1	0.00%	0.16%	0.19%
Mixed race or Multiracial (NH)	0	1	3	0.00%	0.16%	0.57%
Hispanic or Latino (any race)	19	4	5	2.85%	0.65%	0.95%
Total	666	618	524	100.00%	100.00%	100.00%

=== 2000 census ===
As of the census of 2000, there were 666 people, 256 households, and 176 families residing in the city. By 2020, its population declined to 524.

== Notable people ==
- Chone Figgins, American baseball player, born in Leary
