= Arlington, Georgia =

Arlington
- City
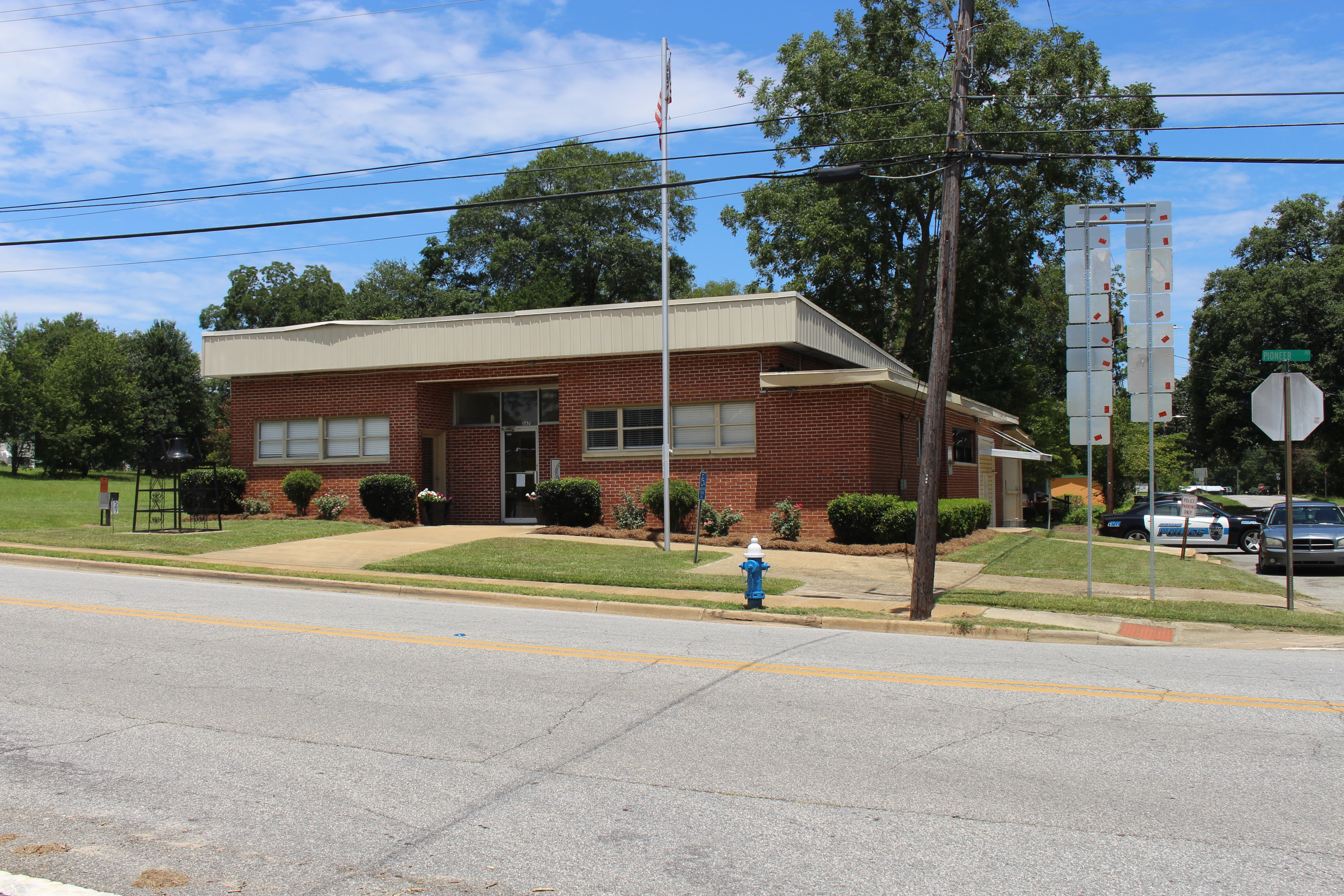
- City hall and police station

- Location in Calhoun County and the state of Georgia

- Location in Georgia Arlington (the United States) Arlington (North America)
- Coordinates: 31°26′22″N 84°43′29″W
- Country: United States
- State: Georgia
- Counties: Calhoun, Early

Area
  - Total: 4.01 sq mi (10.38 km^{2})
  - Land: 4.00 sq mi (10.35 km^{2})
  - Water: 0.012 sq mi (0.03 km^{2})
- Elevation: 299 ft (91 m)

Population (2020)
  - Total: 1,209
  - Density: 302.5/sq mi (116.79/km^{2})
- Time zone: UTC-5 (Eastern (EST))
  - Summer (DST): UTC-4 (EDT)
- ZIP codes: 31713, 39813
- Area code: 229
- FIPS code: 13-02928
- GNIS feature ID: 0310614

Arlington is a city in Calhoun and Early counties, Georgia, United States. Per the 2020 census, the population was 1,209.

== History ==
Arlington was founded in 1873, and was chartered in 1881. Arlington served as county seat from 1923 to 1929. The community was named after the Arlington House, the Virginia home of General Robert E. Lee.

== Geography ==
Arlington is located at 31°26′22″N 84°43′29″W (31.439461, -84.724835). It is located 46 miles (74 km) northeast of Dothan, Alabama and 45 miles (72 km) southwest of Albany. According to the United States Census Bureau, the city has a total area of 4.1 square miles (10.7 km^{2}), of which 0.012 square miles (0.03 km^{2}), or 0.24%, is water. It is located in Calhoun and Early counties and borders Baker County to the east.

== Demographics ==
Historical population
Census	Pop.	Note	%±
1880	250		—
1890	417		66.8%
1900	755		81.1%
1910	1,308		73.2%
1920	1,331		1.8%
1930	1,232		−7.4%
1940	1,337		8.5%
1950	1,382		3.4%
1960	1,462		5.8%
1970	1,698		16.1%
1980	1,572		−7.4%
1990	1,513		−3.8%
2000	1,602		5.9%
2010	1,479		−7.7%
2020	1,209		−18.3%
U.S. Decennial Census; 1850-1870 1870-1880; 1890-1910 1920-1930; 1940 1950 1960; 1970 1980 1990; 2000 2010 2020

=== Racial and ethnic composition ===
Arlington city, Georgia – Racial and ethnic composition Note: the US Census treats Hispanic/Latino as an ethnic category. This table excludes Latinos from the racial categories and assigns them to a separate category. Hispanics/Latinos may be of any race.
Race / Ethnicity (NH = Non-Hispanic)	Pop 2000	Pop 2010	Pop 2020	% 2000	% 2010	% 2020
White alone (NH)	451	321	214	28.15%	21.70%	17.70%
Black or African American alone (NH)	1,119	1,125	964	69.85%	76.06%	79.74%
Native American or Alaska Native alone (NH)	2	3	2	0.12%	0.20%	0.17%
Asian alone (NH)	3	0	2	0.19%	0.00%	0.17%
Native Hawaiian or Pacific Islander alone (NH)	0	0	0	0.00%	0.00%	0.00%
Other race alone (NH)	0	1	0	0.00%	0.07%	0.00%
Mixed race or Multiracial (NH)	4	5	9	0.25%	0.34%	0.74%
Hispanic or Latino (any race)	23	24	18	1.44%	1.62%	1.49%
Total	1,602	1,479	1,209	100.00%	100.00%	100.00%

=== 2020 census ===
As of the 2020 census, Arlington had a population of 1,209, down from 1,479 in 2010.

The median age was 41.2 years. 24.2% of residents were under the age of 18 and 16.2% were 65 years of age or older. For every 100 females there were 88.0 males, and for every 100 females age 18 and over there were 84.5 males age 18 and over.

0.0% of residents lived in urban areas, while 100.0% lived in rural areas.

There were 465 households, of which 33.3% had children under the age of 18 living in them. Of all households, 28.6% were married-couple households, 22.2% were households with a male householder and no spouse or partner present, and 43.9% were households with a female householder and no spouse or partner present. About 29.7% of all households were made up of individuals and 10.7% had someone living alone who was 65 years of age or older.

There were 549 housing units, of which 15.3% were vacant. The homeowner vacancy rate was 2.3% and the rental vacancy rate was 7.7%.

== Education ==
On Calhoun County's side of the Calhoun County School District unit, Calhoun County Elementary School (grades K-5) serves Calhoun County, including some students from Arlington, Edison, Leary, and Morgan. Calhoun County Middle/High are in Edison. On Early County's side, all schools belong to the Early County School District; elementary, middle, and high schools are in Blakely, including Early County High School.

== Notable person ==
- James Earl Carter, Sr., farmer, businessman, legislator, father of President Jimmy Carter

== Gallery ==
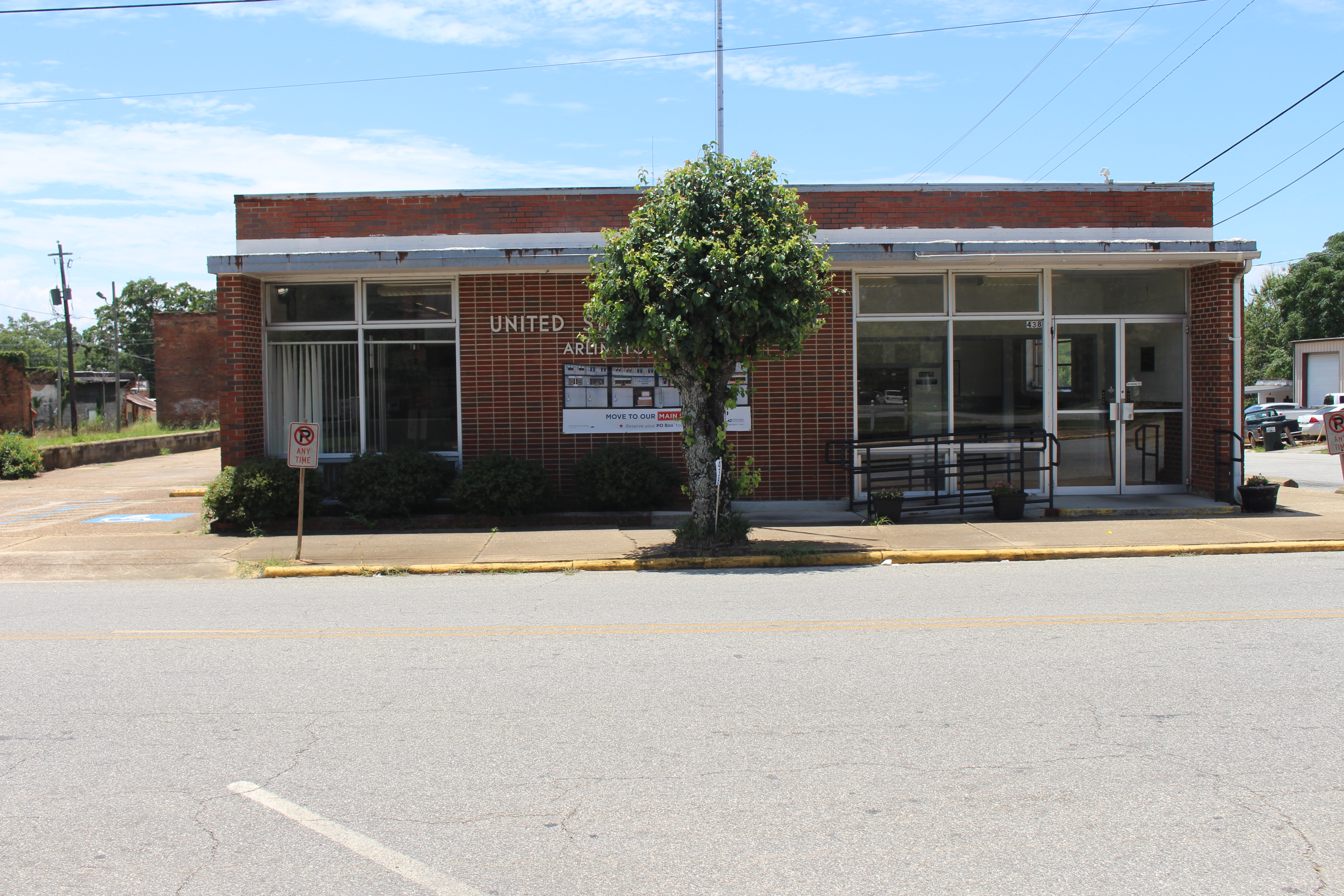
Arlington Post Office
