= W.S. Hull =

American architect

William Sharkey Hull
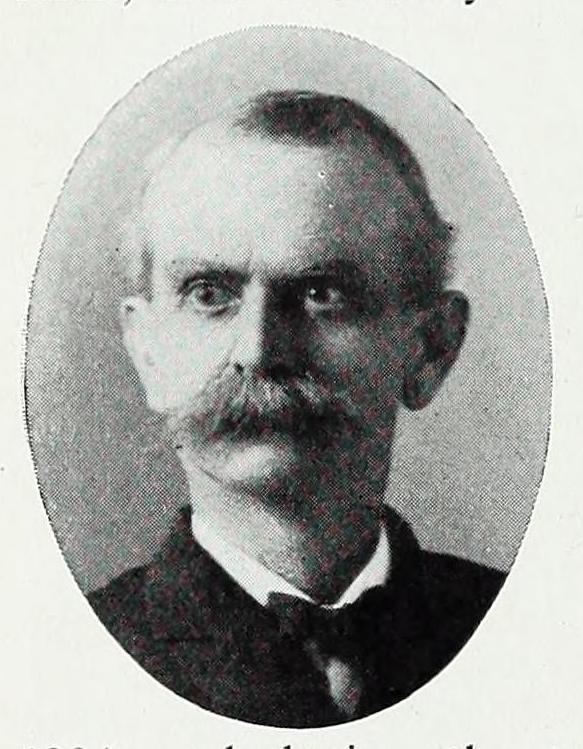
- W. S. Hull, circa 1907
- Born: April 3, 1848; Jackson, Mississippi
- Died: August 4, 1924 (aged 76); Jackson, Mississippi
- Occupation: Architect

William S. Hull (1848-1924) was an architect based in Jackson, Mississippi who designed over twenty county courthouses in the American South.

== Life and career ==
William Sharkey Hull was born April 3, 1848, in Jackson to John T. Hull and Anna M. (Blair) Hull. He attended the Jackson public schools, and in 1865 became a telegraph operator for the Western Union Telegraph Company. In 1876 he changed professions, joining his elder brother Francis Blair Hull's contracting company, established two years earlier. They formed a partnership, F. B. & W. S. Hull, which quickly developed a specialty in public buildings. By the 1880s, the younger Hull had emerged as an architect, having learned on the job. In 1887 he was admitted to the Western Association of Architects, which merged with the American Institute of Architects in 1889. He may have been the first Mississippi architect to be a member of the AIA. The brothers dissolved their partnership in 1904, and W. S. Hull opened his own office as an architect. He practiced for at least ten more years.

== Personal life ==
Hull lived in Alabama during part of the 1880s and 1890s. He was involved in the incorporation of Sheffield, Alabama in 1885, and served as an alderman for five years. In 1893 he was appointed commissioner from Alabama to the World's Columbian Exposition by President Benjamin Harrison. He was an amateur inventor, and experimented with flying machines.

The architect Emmett J. Hull was his nephew and worked for Hull before opening his own office.

Hull died August 4, 1924, in Jackson.

== Legacy ==
Hull's buildings were designed in the popular styles of his times. Until about 1903 most of his buildings were designed in the Richardsonian Romanesque style, and afterwards in the Beaux-Arts style. He was instrumental in the preservation of the Mississippi Governor's Mansion, then at risk of demolition. He built at least twenty courthouses, spread over five southern states.

Although many of his major buildings have been demolished, others survive and have been listed on the United States National Register of Historic Places, with others contribute to listed historic districts.

== Architectural works ==
- Pike County Courthouse, Magnolia, Mississippi (1883, altered)
- Winn Parish Courthouse, Winnfield, Louisiana (1892–96, burned 1917)
- Bienville Parish Courthouse, Arcadia, Louisiana (1895–96, demolished)
- Llano County Jail (former), Llano, Texas (1895, NRHP 1977)
- Titus County Courthouse, Mount Pleasant, Texas (1895, altered)
- Austin County Jail, Bellville, Texas (1896, NRHP 1980)
- Clarke County Courthouse, Grove Hill, Alabama (1899, demolished)
- Greene County Courthouse, Leakesville, Mississippi (1899, demolished)
- Bolivar County Courthouse, Cleveland, Mississippi (1900–01, demolished)
- Grant Parish Courthouse, Colfax, Louisiana (1901–02, demolished)
- Hinds County Courthouse, Jackson, Mississippi (1901–02, demolished)
- Bibb County Courthouse, Centreville, Alabama (1902–03)
- Rapides Parish Courthouse, Alexandria, Louisiana (1902, demolished)
- Sharkey County Courthouse, Rolling Fork, Mississippi (1902–03)
- Tallahatchie County Courthouse, Sumner, Mississippi (1902–03, burned and rebuilt 1909–10, NRHP 2007)
- Ayer Hall, Jackson State University, Jackson, Mississippi (1903, NRHP 1977)
- Franklin Parish Courthouse, Winnsboro, Louisiana (1903, demolished)
- Perry County Courthouse, New Augusta, Mississippi (1904–05)
- Columbia County Courthouse, (Note: A contributing property to the Magnolia Commercial Historic District, NRHP-listed in 2008.) Magnolia, Arkansas (1905)
- Forrest County Courthouse, Hattiesburg, Mississippi (1905–06)
- Choctaw County Courthouse, Butler, Alabama (1906–07)
- Covington County Courthouse, Collins, Mississippi (1906–07, NRHP 1991)
- Jefferson Parish Courthouse (former), Gretna, Louisiana (1906–07)
- Jefferson Davis County Courthouse, Prentiss, Mississippi (1907, NRHP 1994)
- Noxubee County Jail (former), Macon, Mississippi (1907, NRHP 1979)
- Tangipahoa Parish Courthouse, Amite City, Louisiana (1907, demolished)
- Washington County Courthouse, Chatom, Alabama (1907, demolished)
- Y. M. C. A. Building, Jackson, Mississippi (1907, demolished)
- Central High School (former), Jackson, Mississippi (1911, altered 1925)

== Gallery of architectural works ==
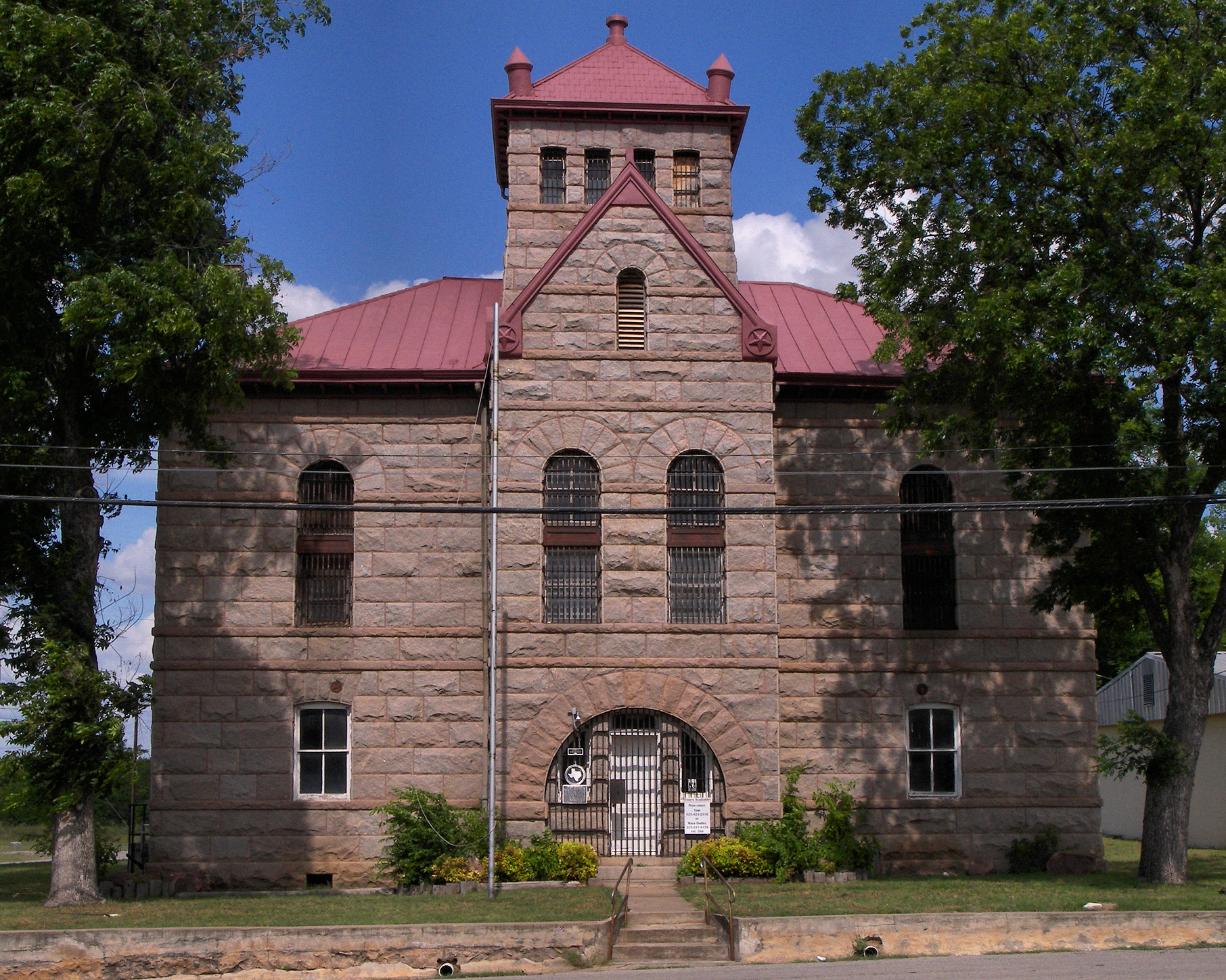
Llano County Jail (former), Llano, Texas, 1895.

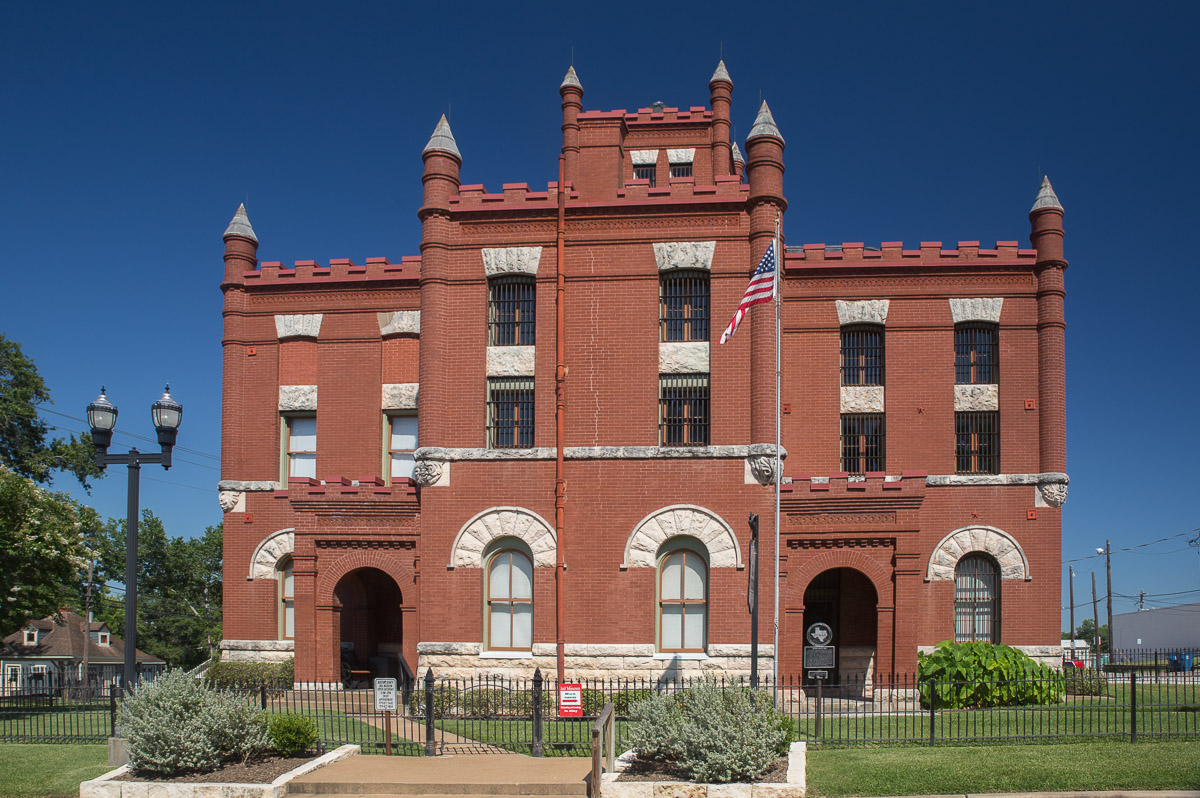
Austin County Jail, Bellville, Texas, 1896.

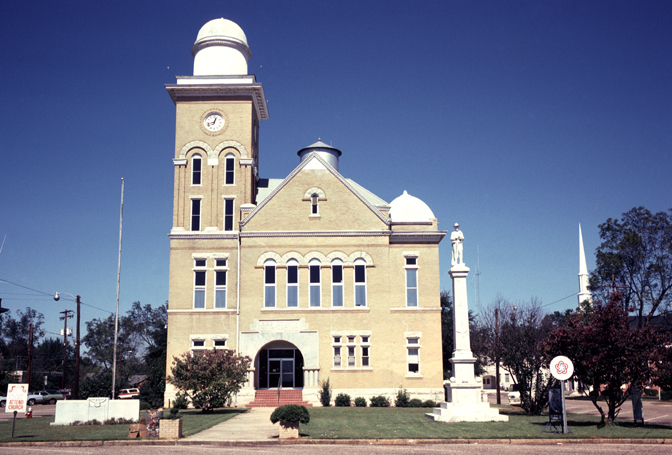
Bibb County Courthouse, Centreville, Alabama, 1902-03.

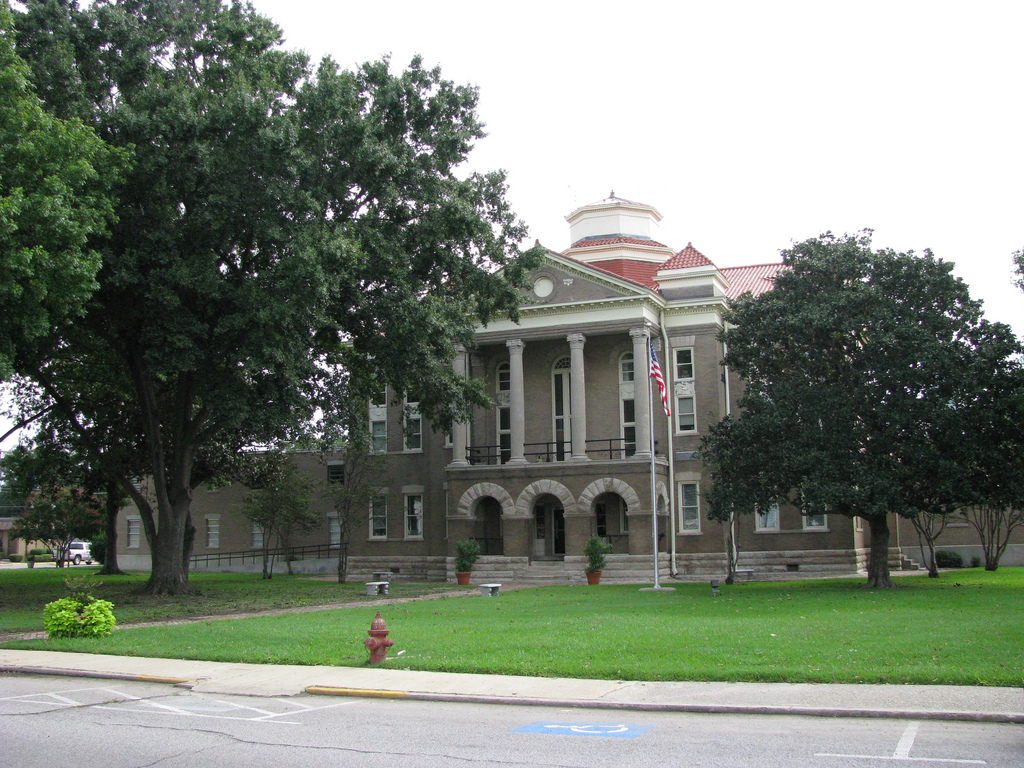
Sharkey County Courthouse, Rolling Fork, Mississippi, 1902-03.

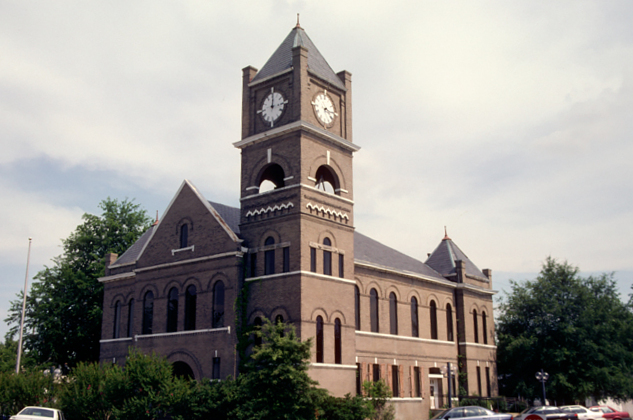
Tallahatchie County Courthouse, Sumner, Mississippi, 1902-03.

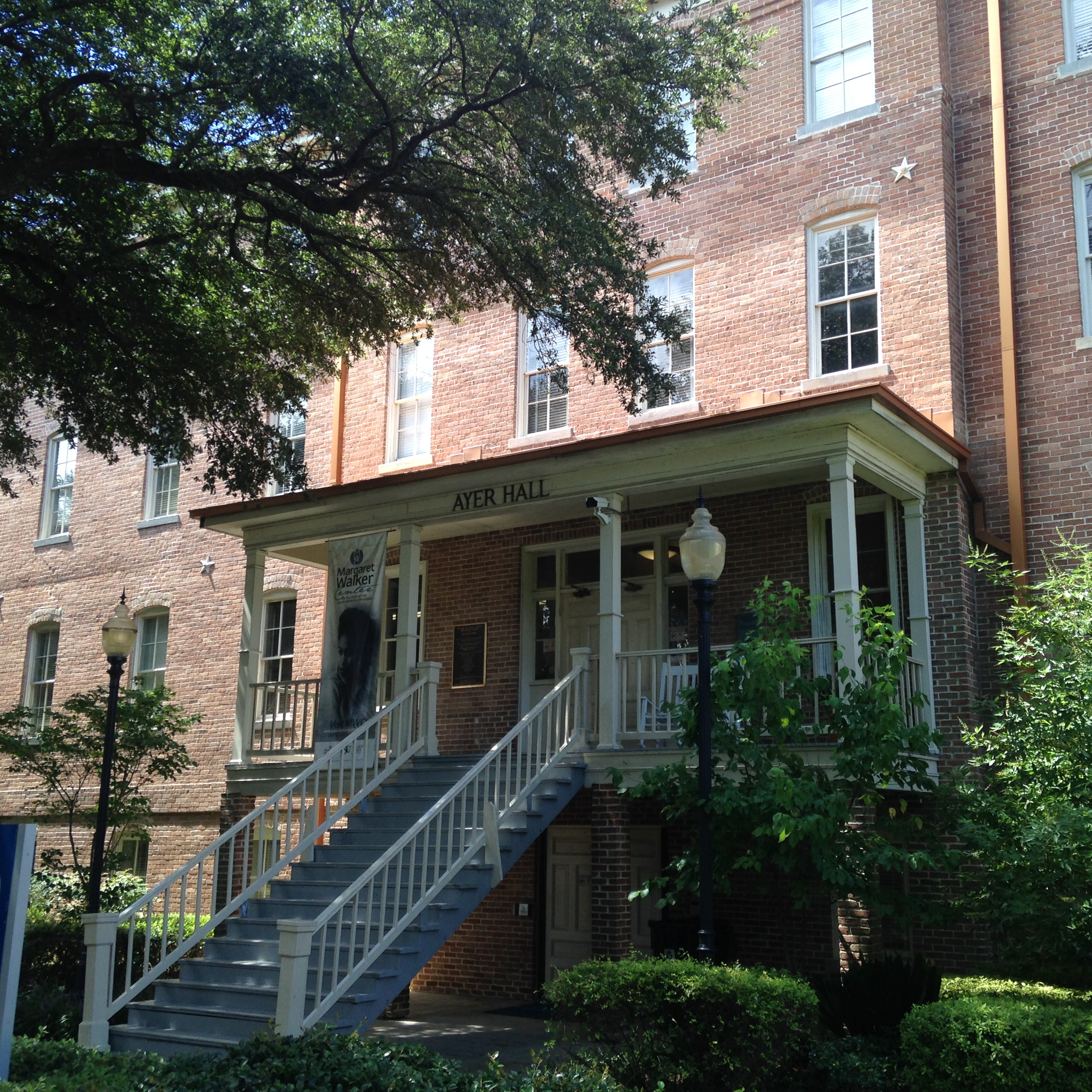
Ayer Hall, Jackson State University, Jackson, Mississippi, 1903.

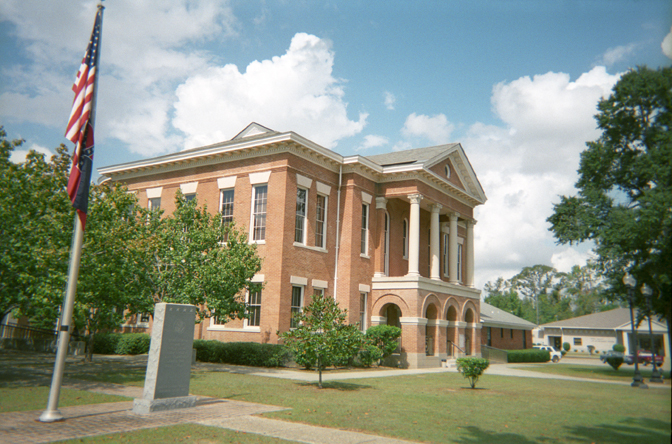
Perry County Courthouse, New Augusta, Mississippi, 1904-05.

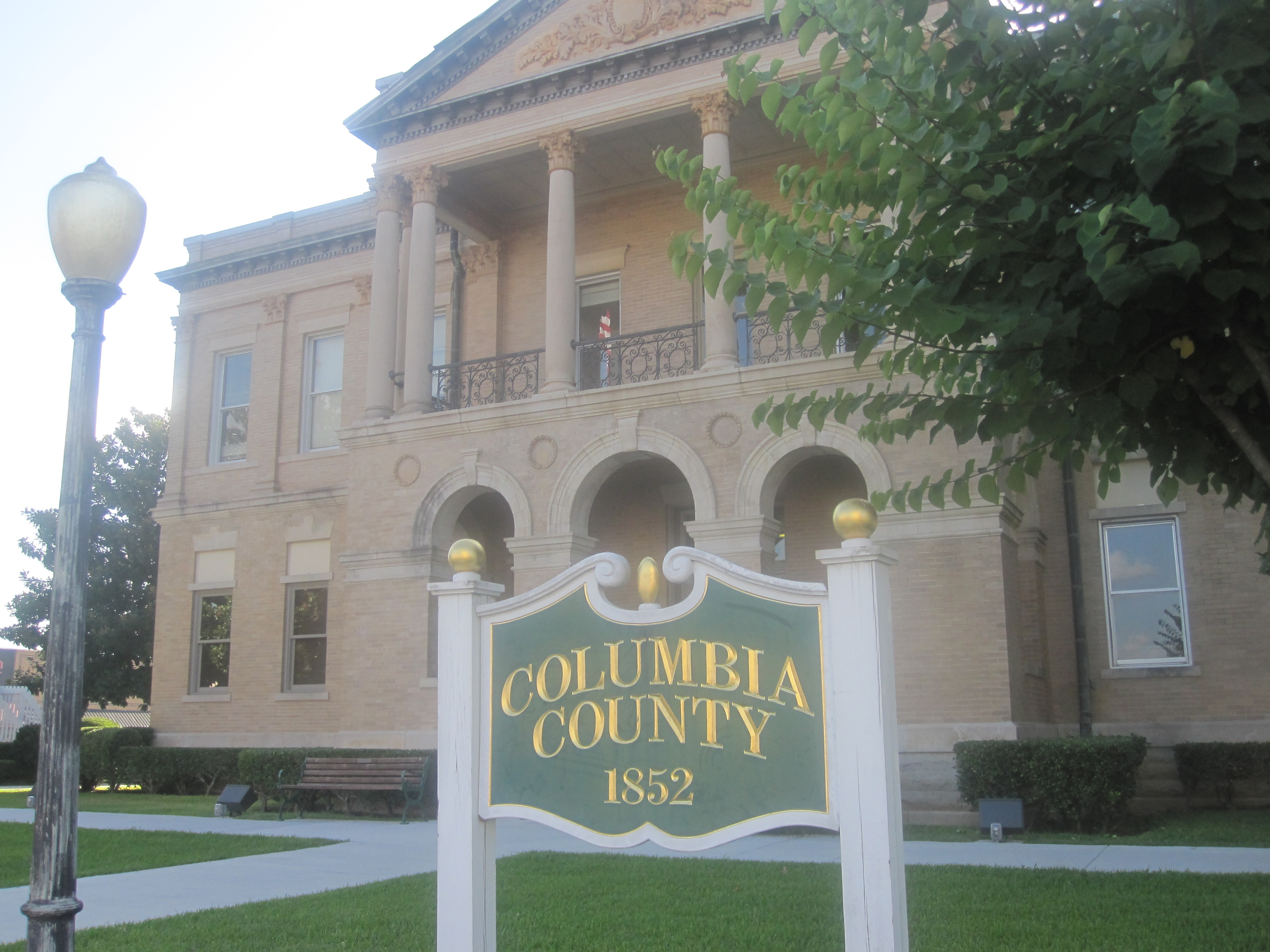
Columbia County Courthouse, Magnolia, Arkansas, 1905.

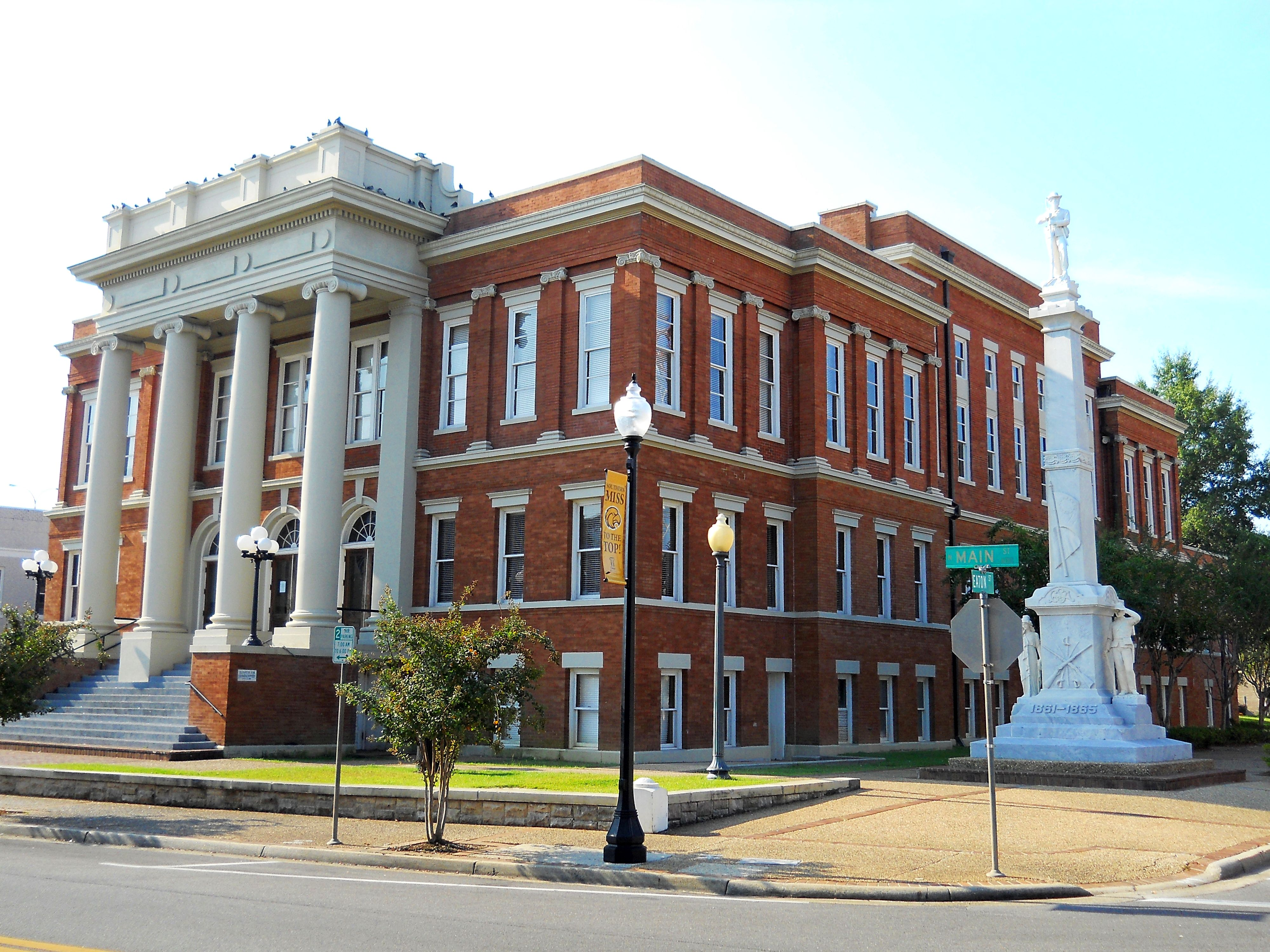
Forrest County Courthouse, Hattiesburg, Mississippi, 1905-06.

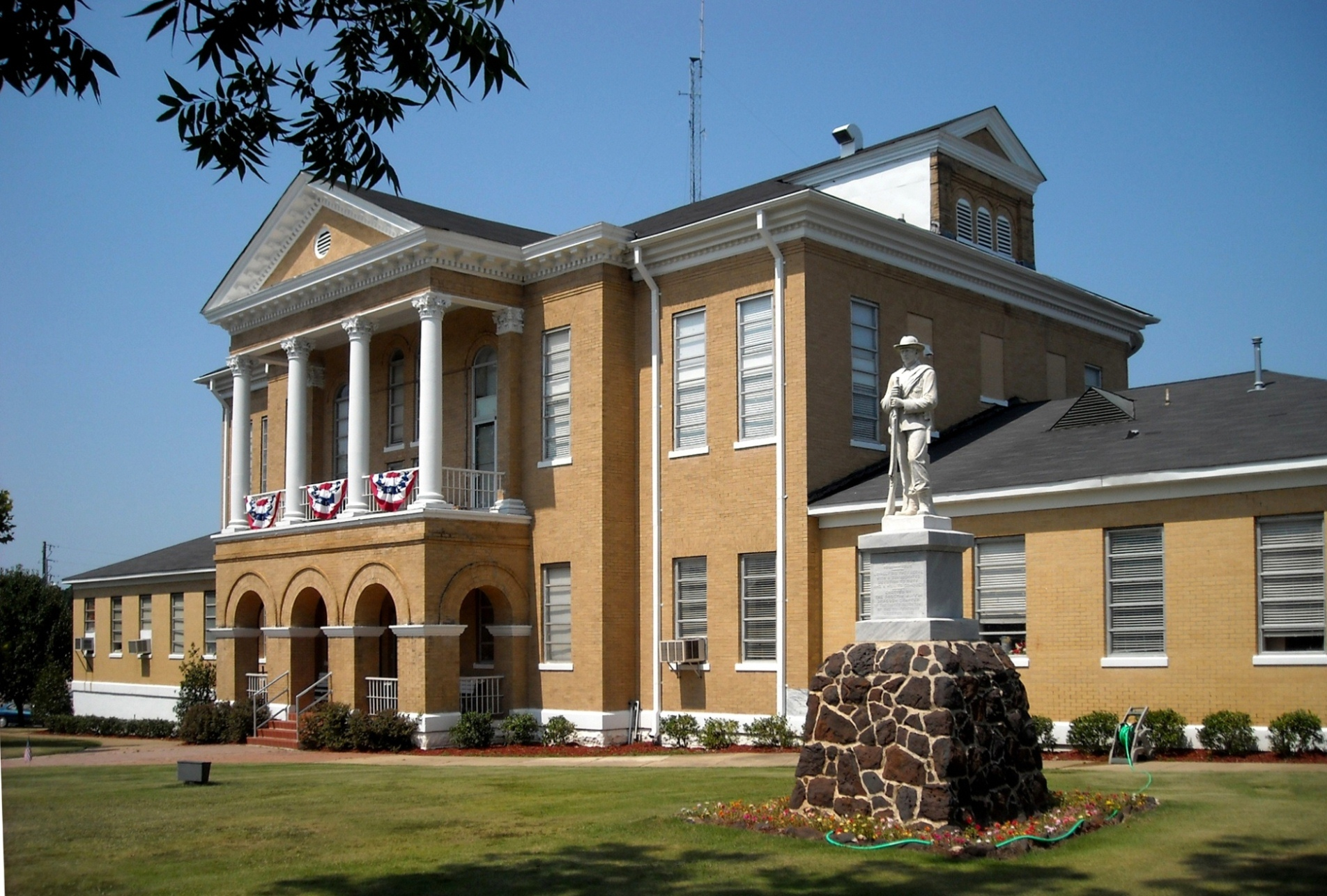
Choctaw County Courthouse, Butler, Alabama, 1906-07.

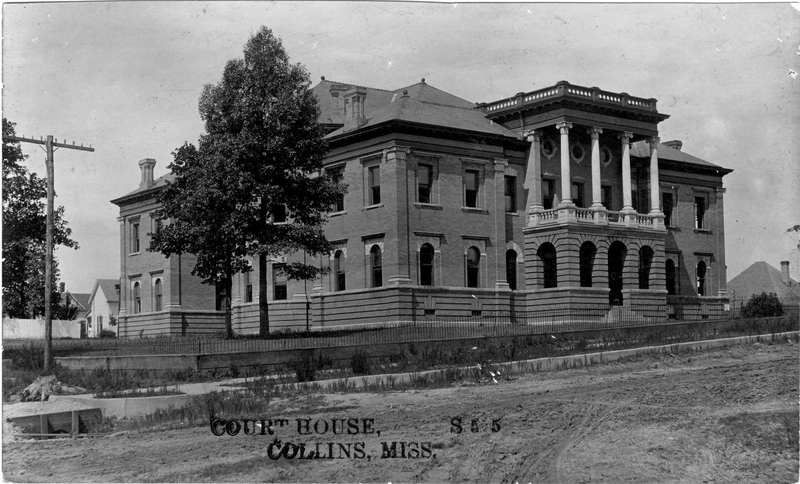
Covington County Courthouse, Collins, Mississippi, 1906-07.

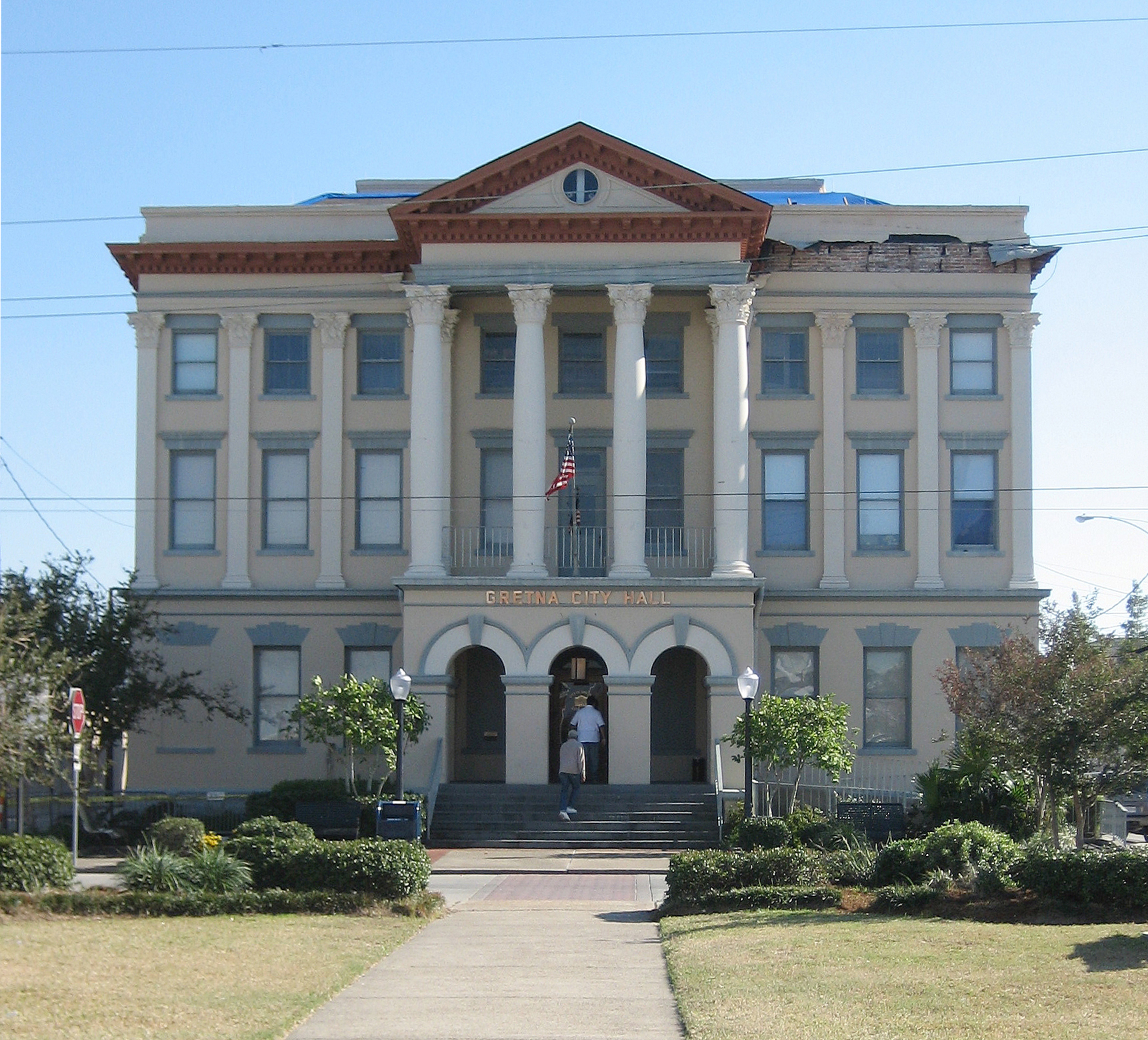
Jefferson Parish Courthouse, Gretna, Louisiana, 1906-07.

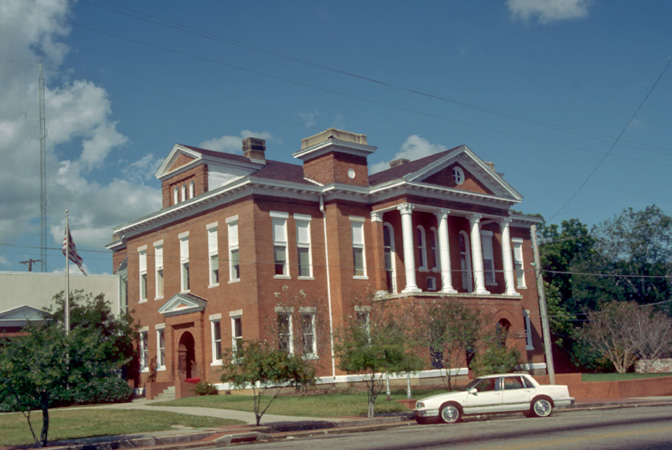
Jefferson Davis County Courthouse, Prentiss, Mississippi, 1907.

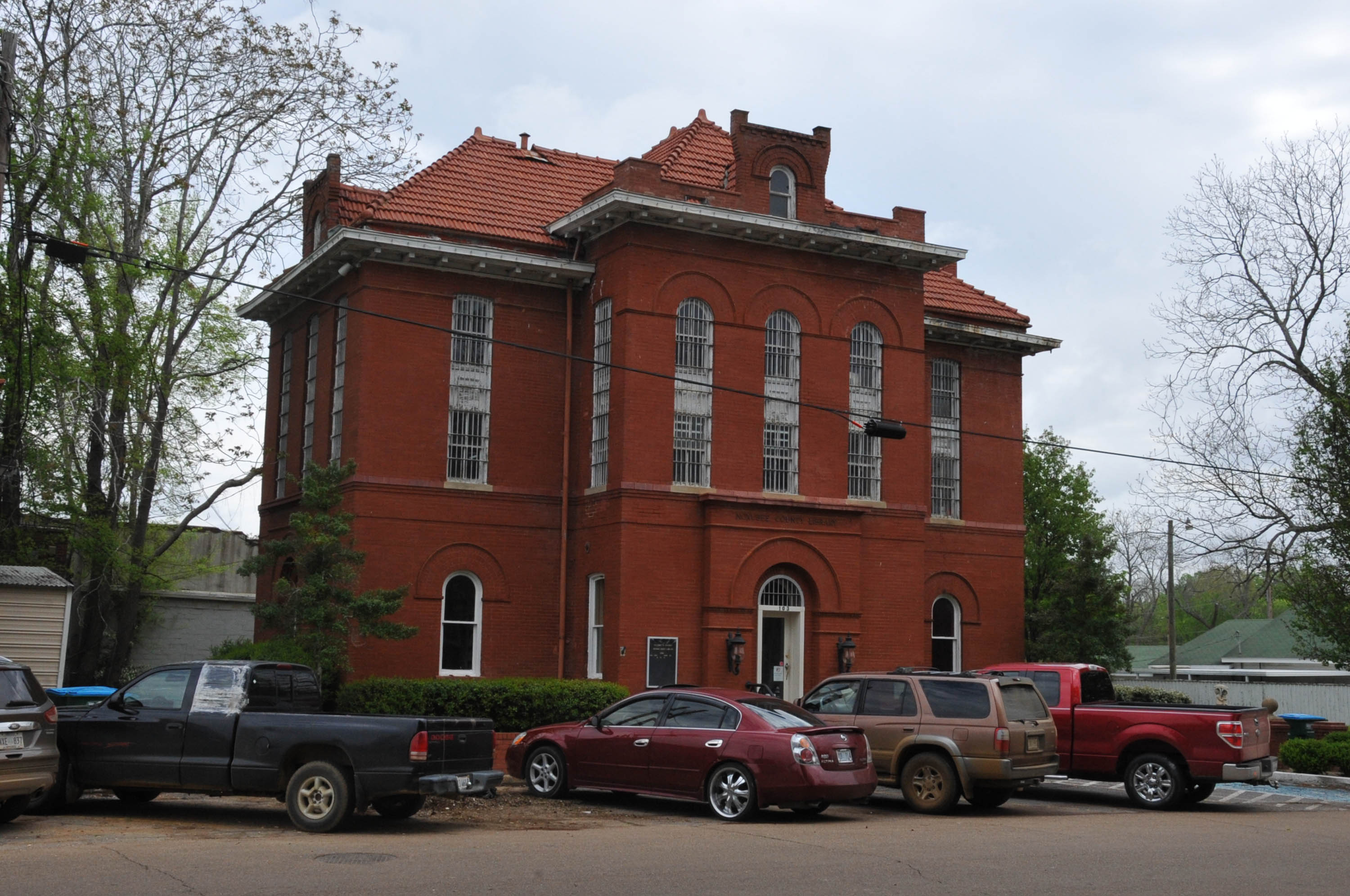
Noxubee County Jail, Macon, Mississippi, 1907.
