= Georgia State Route 520 Business =

Georgia State Route 520 Business may refer to:

- Georgia State Route 520 Business (Albany), a current business loop in Albany, entirely concurrent with U.S. Route 82 Business
- Georgia State Route 520 Business (Cusseta), a former business loop in Cusseta
