= Special routes of U.S. Route 82 =

Special routes of U.S. Route 82

Highway system
- United States Numbered Highway System; List; Special; Divided

Eight special routes of U.S. Route 82 currently exist. Three of them lie within the state of Arkansas, with five more in Texas, and one in Georgia. Seven more existed in the past but have since been decommissioned.

== Texas ==
=== Wolfforth business route ===
State Highway Loop 193
- Location: Wolfforth, TX
- Length: 2.207 mi (3.552 km)
- Existed: 1960–present

=== Holliday business route ===
Business U.S. Highway 82-F
- Location: Holliday, TX
- Length: 3.111 mi (5.007 km)
- Existed: 2006–present

Business U.S. Route 82-F (Bus. US 82-F) is a business route of U.S. Route 82 that runs through the town of Holliday. The highway is concurrent with US 277 Bus. for its entire length.

Route description

Bus. US 82-F begins at an intersection with US 82/US 277 southwest of town. The highway runs through Holliday as Olive Street, sharing a short overlap with FM 368. After crossing into Wichita County the highway ends at an interchange with US 82/US 277.

Junction list

County	Location	mi	km	Destinations	Notes
Archer				US 82 / US 277 – Seymour	
Archer	Holliday			FM 368 north – Iowa Park	West end of FM 368 overlap
Archer	Holliday			FM 368 south – Lake Kickapoo	East end of FM 368 overlap
Wichita				US 82 / US 277 – Wichita Falls	
1.000 mi = 1.609 km; 1.000 km = 0.621 mi: Concurrency terminus

=== Paris business route ===
Business U.S. Highway 82-H
- Location: Paris, TX
- Length: 5.153 mi (8.293 km)
- Existed: 1990–present

Business U.S. Route 82-H (Bus. US 82-H) is a business route of US 82 in the town of Paris in Lamar County, running for just over 5 miles.

Route description

Bus. 82-H begins in western Paris at an interchange with US 82 and Loop 286. The highway runs on two one-way streets (eastbound: Clarksville Street; westbound: Bonham Street) through the center of town, sharing an overlap with a business route of US 271. The highway ends an interchange in the eastern part of the city with US 82/US 271/Loop 286.

Junction list

The entire route is in Paris, Lamar County.

mi	km	Destinations	Notes
		US 82 / Loop 286 – Bonham	
		FM 79 west / FM 137 south – Pat Mayse Lake, Roxton	
		Bus. US 271 north / SH 19 south / SH 24 south – Hugo, Cooper, Sulphur Springs	West end of Bus. US 271 overlap
		Bus. US 271 south – Mount Pleasant	East end of Bus. US 271 overlap
		FM 195 east	
		US 82 / US 271 / Loop 286 – Clarksville, Hugo, Mount Pleasant	
1.000 mi = 1.609 km; 1.000 km = 0.621 mi: Concurrency terminus

=== Clarksville business route ===
Business U.S. Highway 82-J
- Location: Clarksville, TX
- Length: 2.651 mi (4.266 km)
- Existed: 2006–present

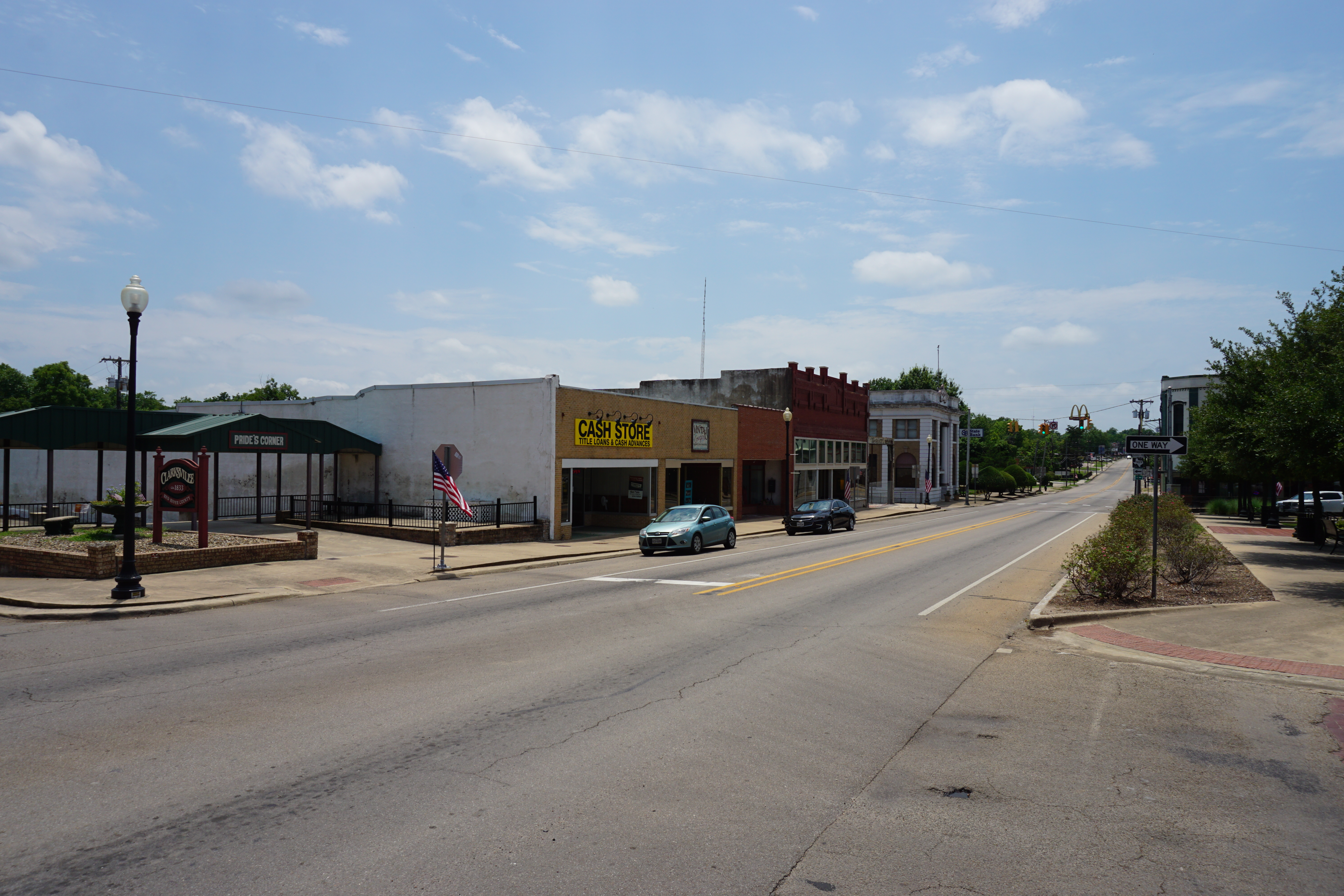
Clarksville business route (Main Street)

=== Avery business route ===
Business U.S. Highway 82-K
- Location: Avery, TX
- Length: 0.81 mi (1,300 m)
- Existed: 1990–present

== Arkansas ==
=== El Dorado business route ===
U.S. Highway 82B
- Location: El Dorado, AR
- Length: 5.425 mi (8.731 km)
- Existed: October 20, 1982–present

U.S. Route 82 Business (US 82B and Hwy. 82B) is a business route of US 82 in Union County, Arkansas.

Major intersections

The entire route is in Union County.

Location	mi	km	Destinations	Notes
El Dorado	0.000	0.000	US 82 – Magnolia, Crossett	Western terminus
El Dorado			US 167B (West Avenue) – South Arkansas Community College West	Western end of US 167B overlap
El Dorado			US 167 (US 63 / AR 7) – Fordyce, Little Rock, Junction City	Eastern end of US 167B overlap
	5.425	8.731	US 82	Eastern terminus
1.000 mi = 1.609 km; 1.000 km = 0.621 mi

=== Felsenthal National Wildlife Refuge spur ===
U.S. Highway 82S
- Location: Felsenthal National Wildlife Refuge, AR
- Length: 0.128 mi (206 m)

U.S. Route 82 Spur (US 82S and Hwy. 82S) is a 0.14-mile (0.23 km) spur route of US 82 in Ashley County, Arkansas.

Route description

The route is essentially a driveway for a Felsenthal National Wildlife Refuge (NWR) facility.

Major intersections

The entire route is in Ashley County.

Location	mi	km	Destinations	Notes
	0.000	0.000	US 82	Northern terminus
	0.128	0.206	Felsenthal NWR facility	Southern terminus
1.000 mi = 1.609 km; 1.000 km = 0.621 mi

=== Montrose business route ===
U.S. Highway 82B
- Location: Montrose, AR
- Length: 2.088 mi (3.360 km)
- Existed: May 22, 2018–present

U.S. Route 82 Business (US 82B and Hwy. 82B) is a 2.03-mile (3.27 km) business route of US 82 in Ashley County, Arkansas.

Route description

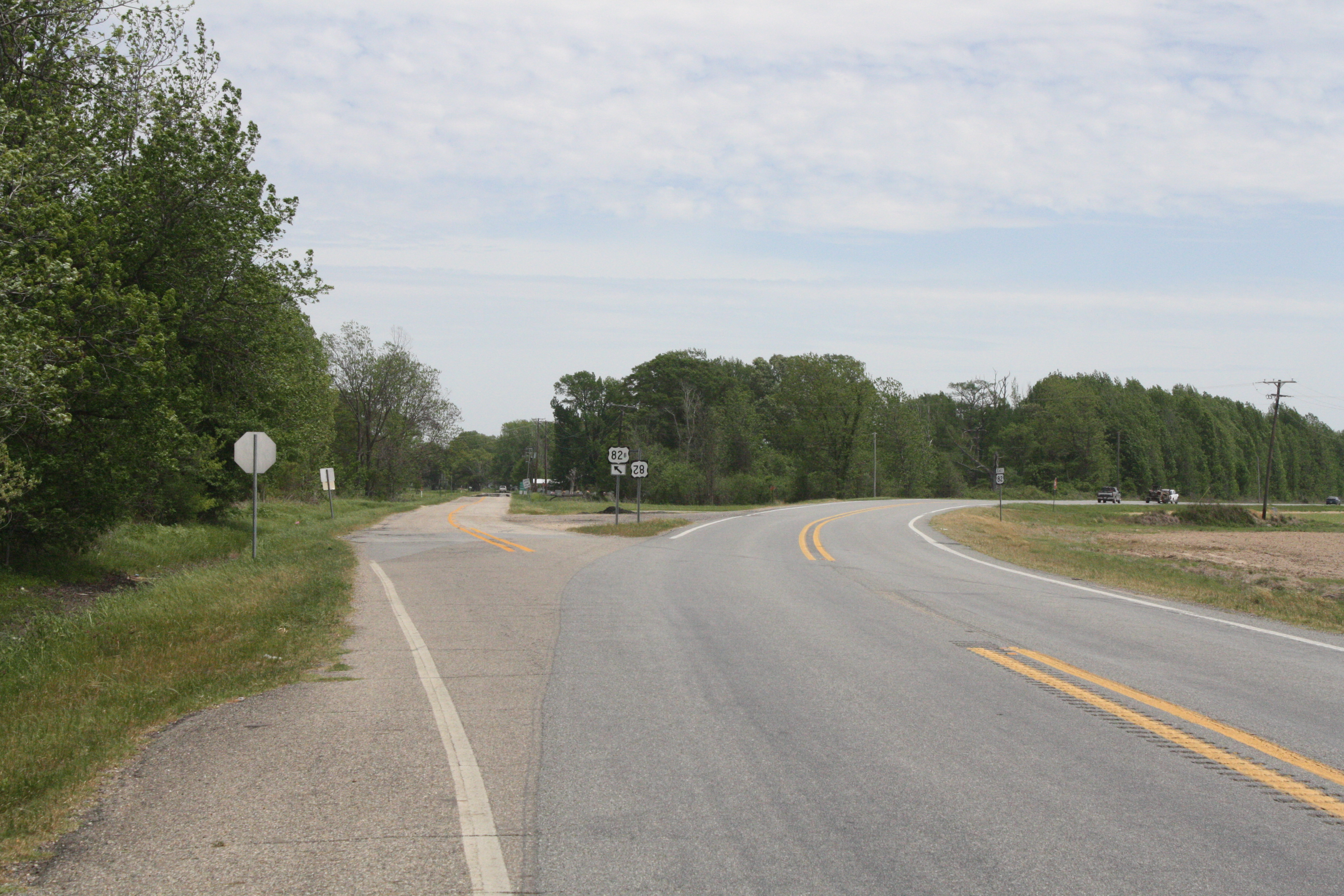
US 82B splits from US 82 (right) around Montrose, AR

US 82B begins at US 82 west of Montrose, a small town in Ashley County, Arkansas within the Arkansas Delta. The highway runs east through a residential area, passing a municipal park before an intersection with the Union Pacific Railroad followed by a junction with US 165 (Main Street) near city hall. Continuing east, US 82 exits Montrose and terminates at the parent route 1.1 miles (1.8 km) west of the Chicot County line.

History

The highway was officially recognized by AASHTO on May 22, 2018. However, it had existed since at least 1953 as US 82 City (US 82C).

Major intersections

The entire route is in Ashley County.

Location	mi	km	Destinations	Notes
	0.000	0.000	US 82 – Thebes, Hamburg	Western terminus
Montrose	1.1	1.8	US 165 (Main Street) – McGehee	
	0.128	0.206	US 82	Eastern terminus
1.000 mi = 1.609 km; 1.000 km = 0.621 mi

== Georgia ==
=== Albany business route ===
U.S. Highway 82 Business
- Location: Albany
- Length: 11.9 mi (19.2 km)

State Route 520 Business
- Location: Albany
- Length: 11.9 mi (19.2 km)

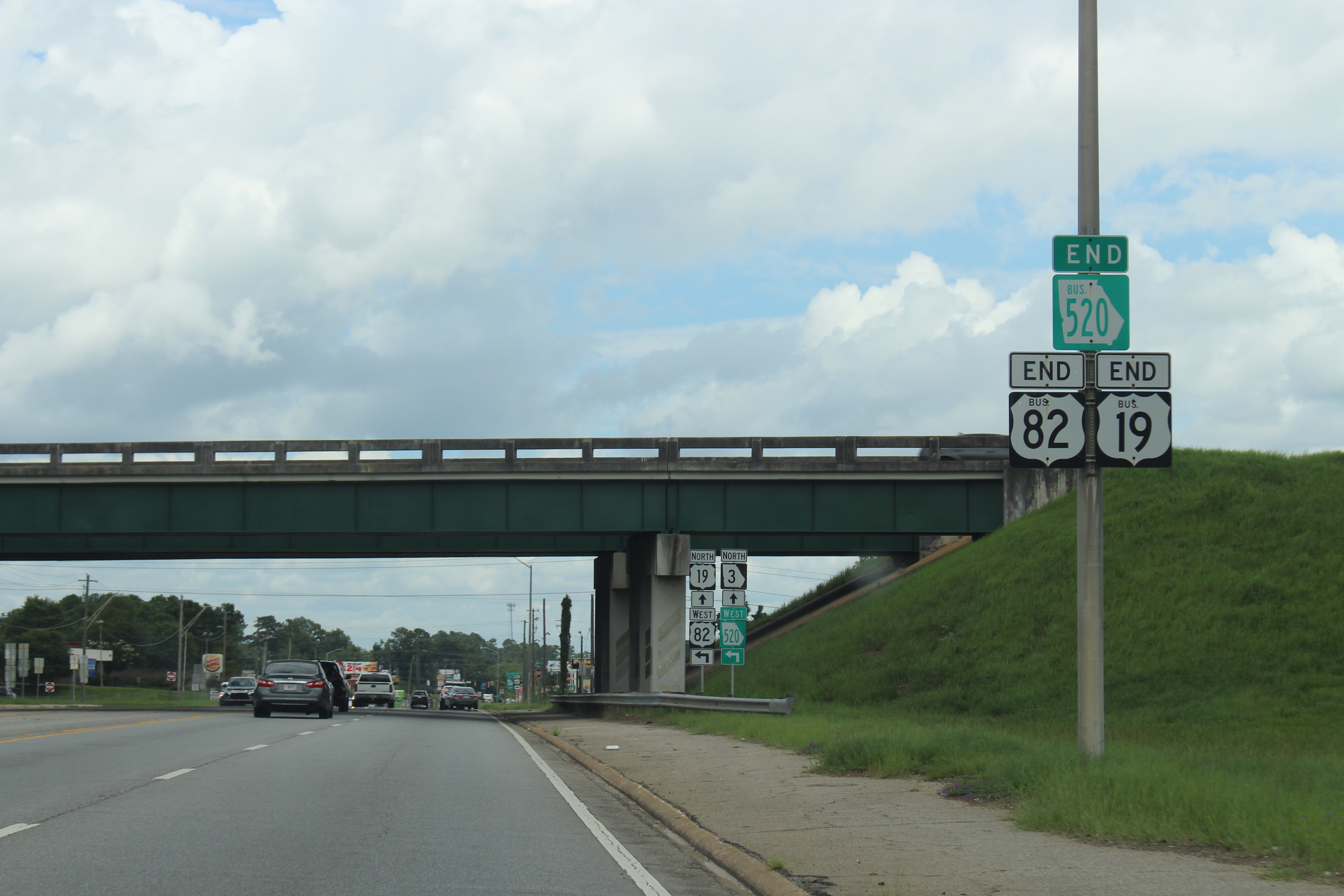
US 82B northern end in Albany

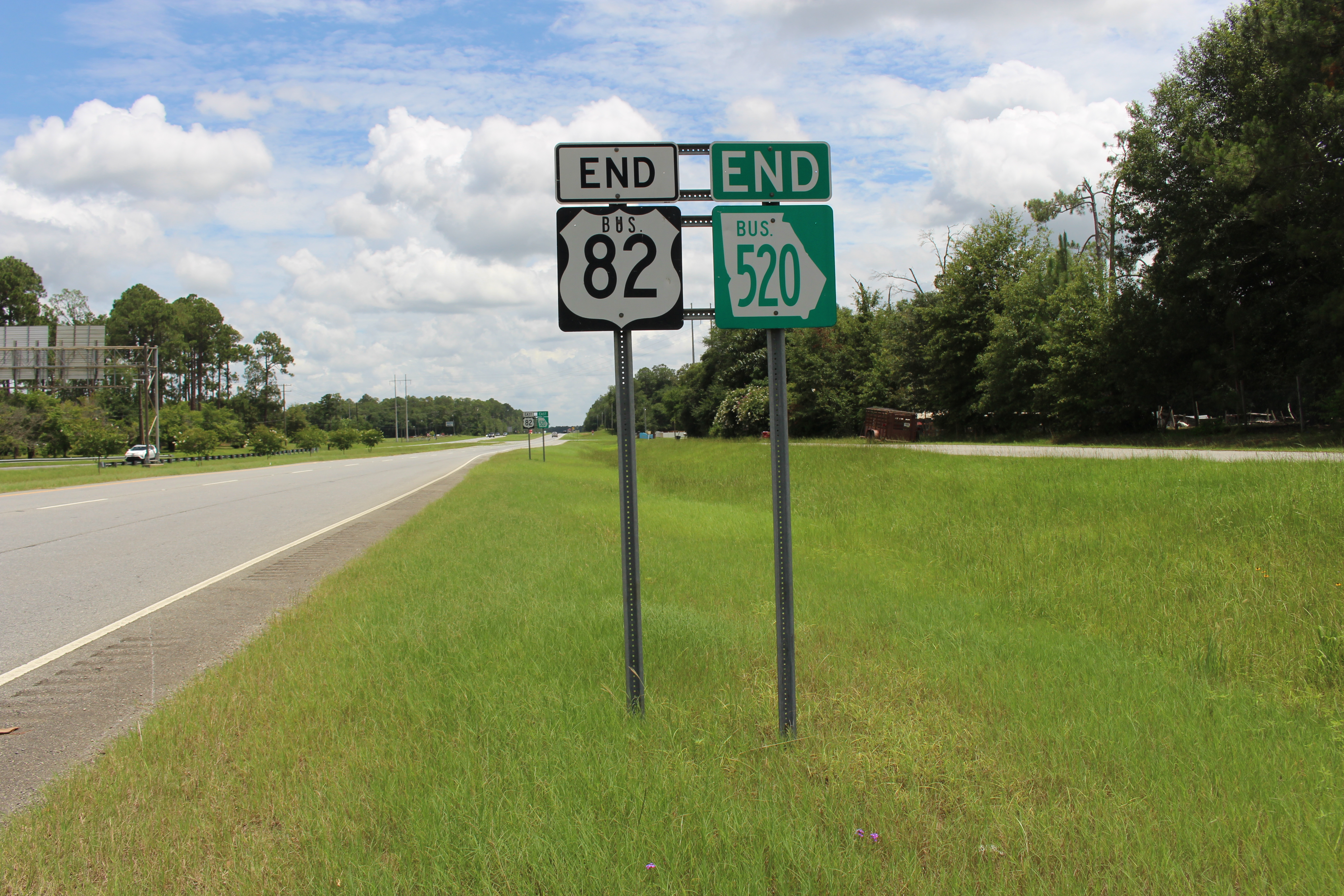
US 82B eastern end in Dougherty County

U.S. Route 82 Business (US 82 Bus.) is a business route of US 82 that exists almost entirely within Albany. It follows North Slappey Boulevard and East Oglethorpe Boulevard through the city, and Sylvester Road east of the city. US 82 Bus. travels entirely concurrent with SR 520 Bus.; it also has a concurrency with US 19 Bus. and a brief concurrency with SR 234.

The entire length of US 82 Bus. is part of the National Highway System, a system of routes determined to be the most important for the nation's economy, mobility, and defense.

The roadway that would eventually become US 82 Bus. was established by the end of 1921 as part of SR 50 in the city. By the end of 1929, this segment of SR 50 was indicated to be under construction. By the middle of 1930, this segment had a completed hard surface. Between February 1948 and April 1949, US 82 was designated on this portion of SR 50. Between June 1960 and June 1963, the path of SR& 50 through Albany was split into SR 50N and SR 50S. SR 50N used Broad Avenue and Sylvester Road, while US 82/SR 50S used Oglethorpe Avenue and Albany Expressway. In 1968, a northeastern bypass of the main part of Albany was proposed as a northern extension of SR 333 from the interchange of US 19/SR 333 and US 82/SR 50S in the eastern part of the city to US 19/SR 3W in the northwestern part of the city. In 1973, SR 50N was redesignated as SR 50 Conn., while SR 50S was redesignated as the SR 50 mainline. The next year, the bypass in Albany was built as a freeway, but there was no indication as to what highways were designated on it. In early 1980, US 19, US 82, and SR 333 were indicated to be designated on the Albany bypass. The old path of the highways were redesignated as US 19 Bus./US 82 Bus. with SR 3 concurrent with them in the western part of the city and SR 50 concurrent with them in the southern and eastern parts of it. Later that year, SR 333 was truncated out of Albany. SR 50 was shifted onto the US 19/US 82 freeway. Its old path in the city was redesignated as SR 50 Bus. In 1988, SR 50 was truncated to Dawson. Its former path from Dawson to Jekyll Island was redesignated as part of SR 520. SR 50 Bus. was redesignated as SR 520 Bus.

The entire route is in Dougherty County.

Location	mi	km	Destinations	Notes
Albany	0.0– 0.2	0.0– 0.32	US 19 / SR 3 (North Slappey Boulevard) / US 82 / SR 520 (Liberty Expressway) / US 19 Bus. begins / SR 520 Bus. begins – Dawson, Thomasville, Leesburg, Marine Corps Logistics Base	Western end of US 19 Bus. and SR 520 Bus. concurrencies; western terminus of US 82 Bus./SR 520 Bus.; northern terminus of US 19 Bus.; Liberty Expressway exit 6
Albany	2.7	4.3	SR 234 west (Gillionville Road) – Morgan, Albany Museum of Art	Western end of SR 234 concurrency
Albany	3.0	4.8	SR 234 east (South Slappey Boulevard) to US 19 – Albany Tech. Col.	Eastern end of SR 234 concurrency; provides access to Southwest Georgia Regional Airport
Albany	4.2	6.8	SR 91 (South Jefferson Street) – Newton	
Albany	5.0	8.0	Dixie Highway (Radium Springs Road)	
Albany	6.6– 6.9	10.6– 11.1	US 19 / SR 3 / SR 133 / SR 300 (Liberty Expressway) – Leesburg, Dawson, Camilla, Marine Corps	Eastern end of US 19 Bus. concurrency; eastern terminus of US 19 Bus.; Liberty Expressway exit 2
	11.9	19.2	US 82 east / SR 520 east (Sylvester Road)	Eastern terminus of US 82 Bus./SR 520 Bus.; eastern end of SR 520 Bus. concurrency; westbound entrance and eastbound exit
1.000 mi = 1.609 km; 1.000 km = 0.621 mi: Concurrency terminus

== Former routes ==
=== Wichita Falls business route ===
Business U.S. Highway 82
- Location: Wichita Falls, TX
- Length: 0.510 mi (821 m)
- Existed: 1969–2009

=== Stamps truck route ===
U.S. Route 82 Truck
- Location: Stamps, Arkansas
- Length: 1.3 mi (2.1 km)
- Existed: September 27, 2006

Highway 82 Truck (US 82T or Hwy. 82T) is a former truck route of 1.3 miles (2.1 km) in Stamps, Arkansas. The route was deleted by the Arkansas State Highway Commission on September 27, 2006.

The route began at US 82 in western Stamps and run east toward downtown, before turning right onto Conlan Street. It turned left onto First Street to an intersection with AR 53. US 82T/AR 53 ran together along Central Avenue to US 82, where the route terminates.

Major intersections
The entire route is in Stamps, Lafayette County.

mi	km	Destinations	Notes
0.0	0.0	US 82 – Lewisville, Buckner	Western terminus
0.8	1.3	AR 53 south (Magnolia Street)	Begin AR 53 overlap
1.3	2.1	US 82 / AR 53 north (Antigo Street) – Lewisville, Buckner	Eastern terminus
1.000 mi = 1.609 km; 1.000 km = 0.621 mi: Concurrency terminus

=== Magnolia business route ===
U.S. Highway 82B
- Location: Magnolia
- Length: 1.65 mi (2.66 km)
- Existed: June 25, 1973–May 20, 2019

U.S. Route 82 Business (US 82B and Hwy. 82B) is a former 1.65-mile (2.66 km) business route of US Route 82 in Columbia County, Arkansas.

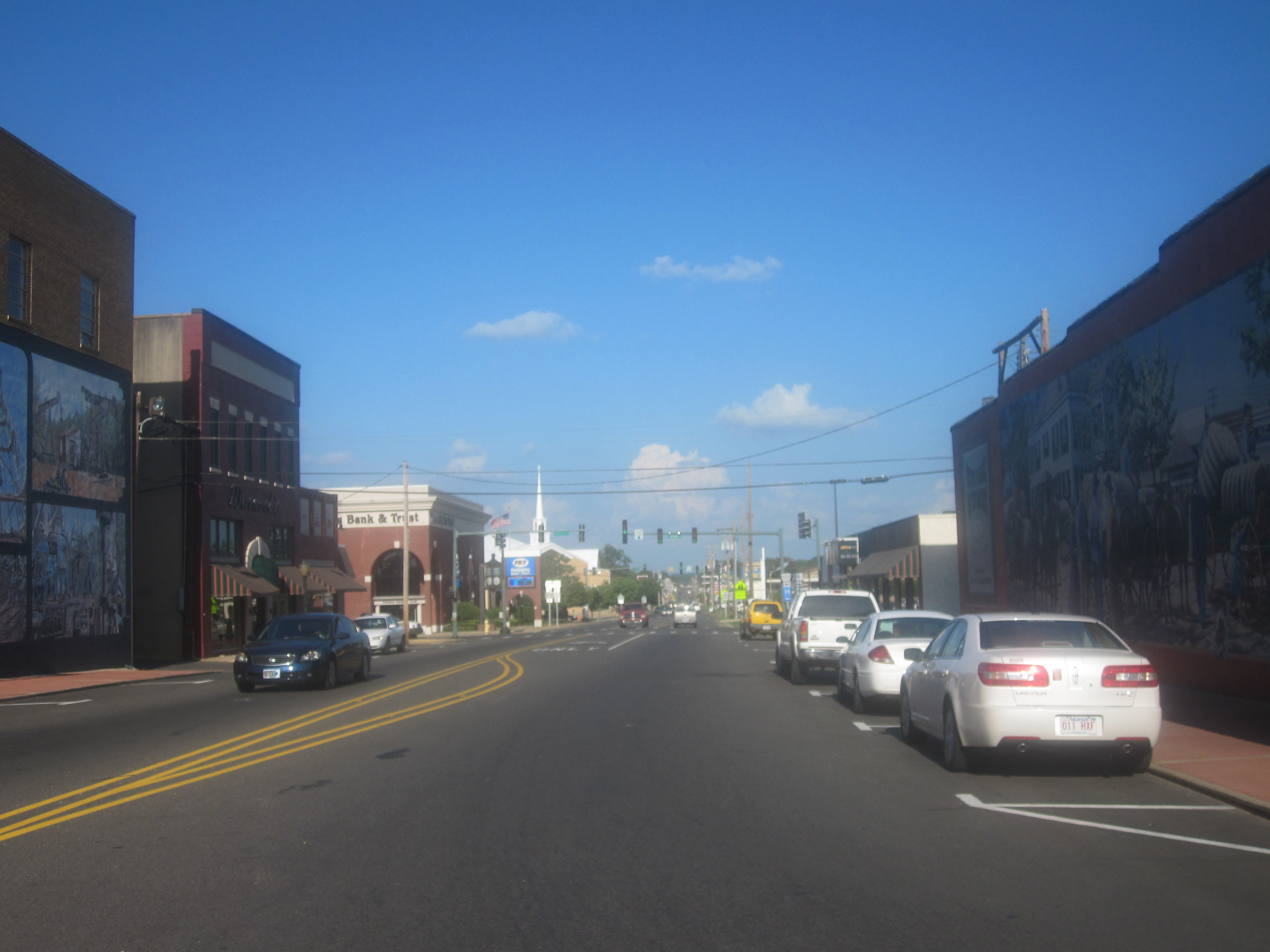
US 82B running as Main Street through the Magnolia Commercial Historic District

Route description

The route's western terminus was at US 371 (Main Street/Vine Avenue) near downtown Magnolia. US 82B ran east along Main Street, passing the Dr. H.A. Longino House before entering the Magnolia Commercial Historic District and circling around the Columbia County Courthouse. All three properties are listed on the National Register of Historic Places (NRHP). Continuing east, US 82B had a junction with Jackson Street, which ran north as Highway 355 and south as US 79, which provided access to Highway 19 just south of this junction. Highway 355 provided access to Magnolia Hospital and Southern Arkansas University. US 82B continued due east through a commercial area, including a strip mall and various restaurants. The route turned southeast after Fairview Street, a direction it followed until meeting US 79/US 82 where it terminated near the city limits.

History

Following construction of a new alignment US 82 in the vicinity of Magnolia, Waldo, and McNeil, the Arkansas State Highway Commission created the US 82B designation in Magnolia on May 29, 1970 along the former alignment of US 82 through downtown Magnolia. The designation was officially approved by AASHTO on June 25, 1973. It was decommissioned on May 20, 2019.

Major intersections

The entire route was in Magnolia, Columbia County.

mi	km	Destinations	Notes
0.00	0.00	US 371 (Main Street / Vine Avenue)	Western terminus
0.27	0.43	US 79B south to AR 19 south / AR 355 north (Jackson Street)	US 79B northern terminus, AR 355 southern terminus
1.65	2.66	US 79 / US 82	Eastern terminus
1.000 mi = 1.609 km; 1.000 km = 0.621 mi

=== Tuscaloosa bypass route ===
U.S. Route 82 Bypass
- Location: Tuscaloosa, Alabama
- Existed: yes

=== Montgomery business route ===
U.S. Route 82 Business
- Location: Montgomery, Alabama
- Existed: 1958–1975

=== Montgomery bypass route 1 ===
U.S. Route 82 Bypass
- Location: Montgomery, Alabama
- Existed: 1961–1965

=== Montgomery bypass route 2 ===
U.S. Route 82 Bypass
- Location: Montgomery, Alabama
- Existed: 1965–1975

=== Montgomery truck route ===
U.S. Route 82 Truck
- Location: Montgomery, Alabama
- Existed: 1960–1960

=== Montgomery–Prattville alternate route ===
U.S. Route 82 Alternate
- Location: Montgomery, AL–Prattville, AL
- Existed: yes

=== Shellman spur route ===
State Route 50 Spur
- Location: Shellman, Georgia
- Existed: 1937–1937

State Route 50 Spur (SR 50 Spur) was a very short-lived spur route of SR 50 that existed in 1937 in the northeastern part of Randolph County. Between the beginning of April and the beginning of July, it was established from an undetermined point in Shellman north to an intersection with SR 50. By the beginning of October, it was redesignated as a southern extension of SR 41.

The entire route was in Randolph County.

Location	mi	km	Destinations	Notes
Shellman			Shellman	Southern terminus
			SR 50	Northern terminus
1.000 mi = 1.609 km; 1.000 km = 0.621 mi

=== Albany spur route ===
State Route 50 Spur
- Location: Albany, Georgia
- Existed: 1963–1980

State Route 50 Spur (SR 50 Spur) was a spur route of SR 50 that existed in the city limits of Albany, within Dougherty County. Between June 1960 and June 1963, it was established on Third Avenue from US 82/SR 50 in the far western part of the city to US 19/SR 3W. In 1980, it was decommissioned.

The entire route was in Albany, Dougherty County.

mi	km	Destinations	Notes
		US 82 / SR 50	Western terminus
		US 19 / SR 3W	Eastern terminus
1.000 mi = 1.609 km; 1.000 km = 0.621 mi

=== Albany connector route ===
State Route 50 Connector
- Location: Albany, Georgia
- Existed: 1973–1980

State Route 50 Connector (SR 50 Conn.) was a connecting route for SR 50 through the city limits of Albany. The roadway that would eventually become SR 50 Conn. was established at least as early as 1919 as SR 32 from Dawson through Albany and into Sylvester. By the end of 1921, SR 50 was designated across the state. This truncated SR 32 at Ashburn. By the end of 1926, the portion of SR 50 in the eastern part of Albany had a "completed hard surface".

By the middle of 1930, from west of Albany to the Worth–Tift county line, the highway had a completed hard surface. The western half of the Dougherty County portion of the Dawson–Albany segment had a completed semi hard surface. In January 1932, the Dawson–Albany segment had a completed hard surface.

Between February 1948 and April 1949, US 82 was designated on SR 50 through the Albany area. Between June 1960 and June 1963, the path of SR& 50 through Albany was split into SR 50N and SR 50S. SR 50N used Broad Avenue and Sylvester Road, while US 82/SR 50S used Oglethorpe Avenue and Albany Expressway. In 1973, SR 50N was redesignated as SR 50 Conn., while SR 50S was redesignated as the SR 50 mainline. In 1980, the connector was decommissioned.

=== Albany business loop ===
State Route 50 Business
- Location: Albany, Georgia
- Existed: 1980–1988

State Route 50 Business (SR 50 Bus.) was a business route of SR 50 that existed in the city limits of Albany within Dougherty County. The roadway that would eventually become SR 50 Bus. was established at least as early as 1919 as SR 32 from Dawson through Albany and into Sylvester. By the end of 1921, SR 50 was designated across the state. This truncated SR 32 at Ashburn. By the end of 1926, the portion of SR 50 in the eastern part of Albany had a "completed hard surface".

By the middle of 1930, from west of Albany to the Worth–Tift county line, the highway had a completed hard surface. The western half of the Dougherty County portion of the Dawson–Albany segment had a completed semi hard surface. In January 1932, the Dawson–Albany segment had a completed hard surface.

Between February 1948 and April 1949, US 82 was designated on SR 50 in the Albany area. Between June 1960 and June 1963, the path of SR& 50 through Albany was split into SR 50N and SR 50S. SR 50N used Broad Avenue and Sylvester Road, while US 82/SR 50S used Oglethorpe Avenue and Albany Expressway. In 1968, a northeastern bypass of the main part of Albany was proposed as a northern extension of SR 333 from the interchange of US 19/SR 333 and US 82/SR 50S in the eastern part of the city to US 19/SR 3W in the northwestern part of the city. In 1973, SR 50N was redesignated as SR 50 Conn., while SR 50S was redesignated as the SR 50 mainline. In early 1980, US 19, US 82, and SR 333 were indicated to be designated on the Albany bypass. The old path of the highways were redesignated as US 19 Bus./US 82 Bus. with SR 3 concurrent with them in the western part of the city and SR 50 concurrent with them in the southern and eastern parts of it. Later that year, SR 333 was truncated out of Albany, and SR 50 was shifted onto the US 19/US 82 freeway in its place. Its old path in the city was redesignated as SR 50 Bus. In 1988, SR 50 was truncated to Dawson. Its former path from Dawson to Jekyll Island was redesignated as part of SR 520. SR 50 was redesignated as SR 520 Bus.

=== Jekyll Island connector route ===
State Route 50 Connector
- Location: Jekyll Island, Georgia
- Existed: 1973–1981

State Route 50 Connector (SR 50 Conn.) was a connecting route of SR 50 that existed in the southern part of Jekyll Island within Glynn County. In 1952, SR 50 was extended to the southern part of Jekyll Island. In 1973, SR 50 was extended around the northern part of Jekyll Island. SR 50 Conn. was designated on Ben Fortson Parkway between two intersections with SR 50. In 1981, SR 50 was truncated to the southwestern part of Jekyll Island, with SR 50 Conn. being decommissioned.

The entire route was in Jekyll Island, Glynn County.

mi	km	Destinations	Notes
		SR 50	Western terminus
		SR 50	Eastern terminus
1.000 mi = 1.609 km; 1.000 km = 0.621 mi

== Sources ==
- "Minutes of the Meeting of the Arkansas State Highway Commission" (PDF). Little Rock: Arkansas State Highway Commission. 1953–1969. OCLC 21798861. Archived from the original (PDF) on 2018-10-01.
- "Minutes of the Meeting of the Arkansas State Highway Commission" (PDF). Little Rock: Arkansas State Highway Commission. 1970–1979. OCLC 21798861. Archived from the original (PDF) on 2011-11-05.
- "Minutes of the Meeting of the Arkansas State Highway Commission" (PDF). Little Rock: Arkansas State Highway Commission. 1980–1989. OCLC 21798861. Archived from the original (PDF) on 2016-03-28.
- "Minutes of the Meeting of the Arkansas State Highway Commission" (PDF). Little Rock: Arkansas State Highway Commission. 1990–1999. OCLC 21798861. Archived from the original (PDF) on 2019-07-21.
- "Minutes of the Meeting of the Arkansas State Highway Commission" (PDF). Little Rock: Arkansas State Highway Commission. 2000–2009. OCLC 21798861. Archived from the original (PDF) on 2016-03-24.
- "Minutes of the Meeting of the Arkansas State Highway Commission" (PDF). Little Rock: Arkansas State Highway Commission. 2010–2019. OCLC 21798861. Archived from the original (PDF) on 2016-03-04.
