= Thomas Hudson (academic administrator) =

American academic administrator

Thomas K. Hudson is an American academic administrator who served as the 12th president of Jackson State University from November 2020 until March 2023.

== Early life and education ==
Thomas K. Hudson was raised in Jackson, Mississippi. He graduated from Provine High School in 1995. Hudson earned a bachelor's degree from Jackson State University in 1999, and a J.D. from the University of Mississippi School of Law.

== Career ==
Hudson worked in practiced law and later worked as an equal employment opportunity specialist at the Federal Emergency Management Agency.

In 2012, he joined the staff at Jackson State University, working in various roles including as the chief operating officer, chief diversity officer, and its Title IX coordinator. Hudson served as acting president before being named its 12th president on November 19, 2020, succeeding William B. Bynum. In January 2023, Hudson received a vote of no-confidence from the university faculty senate.

== Personal life ==
Hudson is married to Phylandria. They have two daughters.
