= Jefferson Davis County Courthouse =

- U.S. National Register of Historic Places
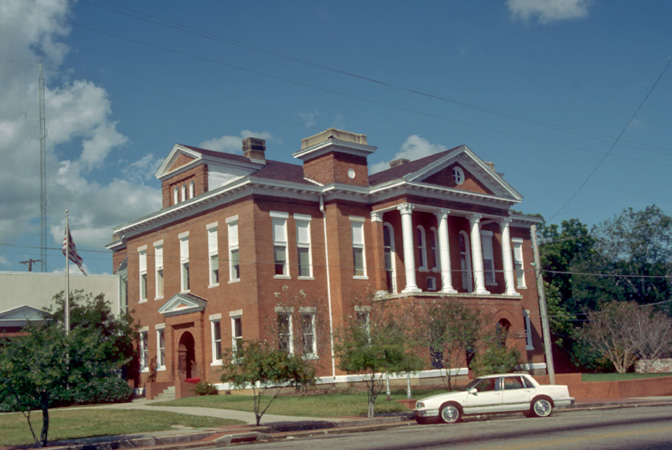
- Jefferson Davis County Courthouse, 1993 photograph by Calvin Beale

- Location within Mississippi Location within the United States
- Interactive map showing the location of Jefferson Davis County Courthouse
- Location: Jct. of N. Columbia Ave. and Third St., Prentiss, Mississippi
- Coordinates: 31°36′2″N 89°51′55″W
- Area: less than one acre
- Built: 1907
- Built by: W.J. McGee
- Architect: W.S. Hull
- Architectural style: Classical Revival
- NRHP reference No.: 94001308
- Added to NRHP: November 10, 1994

Jefferson Davis County Courthouse is a historic county courthouse built in 1907 in Prentiss, Mississippi, the county seat of Jefferson Davis County. The courthouse was added to the National Register of Historic Places on November 10, 1994. It is located at the junction of North Columbia Avenue and 3rd Street.

The building is brick and was designed in a Neoclassical architecture style. A jail was added to its southwest corner in 1985. It was designed by W.S. Hull of Jackson, Mississippi. He designed many other courthouses in Mississippi, Louisiana and Alabama. Until 1903, his county courthouse designs were Richardsonian Romanesque.

== See also ==
- National Register of Historic Places listings in Mississippi
