= Denise Jones Gregory =

American academic administrator

Denise Jones Gregory is an American academic administrator serving as the fourteenth president of Jackson State University since 2026.

== Life ==
Gregory is a native of Columbus, Mississippi.

Gregory earned a B.S. in chemistry from Jackson State University (JSU), graduating magna cum laude in 1994. She completed a Ph.D. in chemistry from Georgia Tech and conducted research at the U.S. Department of Agriculture. She is a member of Delta Sigma Theta. She attended leadership training through the new presidents academy of the American Association of State Colleges and Universities and executive programs through Clark Atlanta University.

Gregory was the associate provost of student success and diversity at Samford University. While at Samford, she was also the National Collegiate Athletic Association faculty athletic representative.

Gregory worked at JSU as the provost and vice president of academic affairs. On May 7, 2025, she became interim president following Marcus Thompson's resignation. She was named the fourteenth president of JSU on April 16, 2026.
