= Ayer Hall =

Historic building at Jackson State University

- U.S. National Register of Historic Places
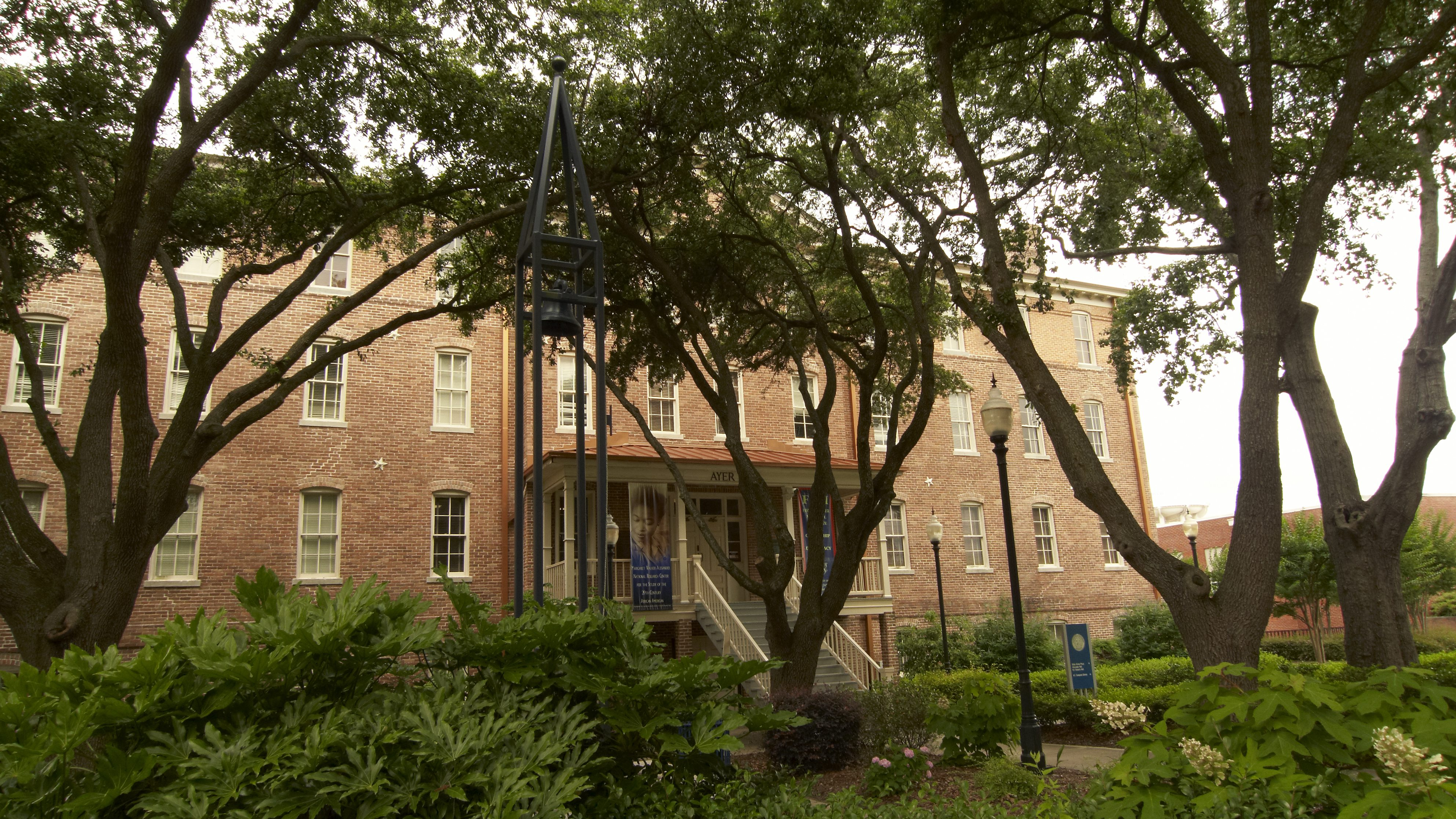

- Location within Mississippi
- Location: 1400 Lynch St. on Jackson State University campus, Jackson, Mississippi
- Coordinates: 32°17′45″N 90°12′27″W
- Area: less than one acre
- Built: 1903
- Architect: W. D. Hull
- NRHP reference No.: 77000788
- Added to NRHP: July 14, 1977

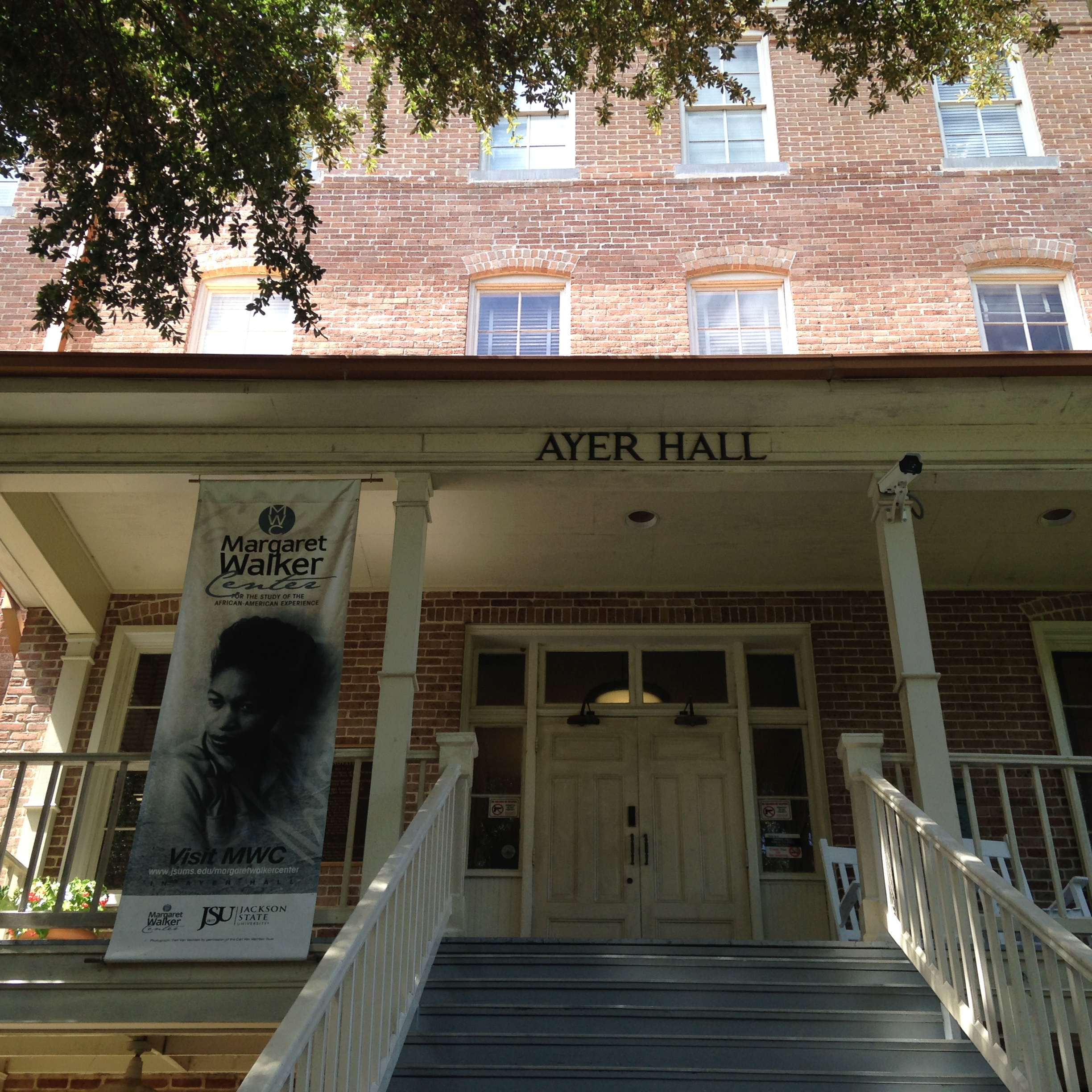

Ayer Hall is a historic building on the campus of Jackson State University. It was the first academic building for what was established as Natchez Seminary after it moved to Jackson, Mississippi and became Jackson College. It is named for Jackson State's first president, Charles Ayer. It is listed on the National Register of Historic Places. It was designated a Mississippi Landmark in 1986.

It was built in 1903. A short video tribute was made about it. In 1940, Jackson College was acquired by the state of Mississippi and became Jackson State University.

== See also ==
- National Register of Historic Places listings in Hinds County, Mississippi
