= Charles Ayer =

Charles Ayer (March 16, 1826 – March 28, 1901) was an American Baptist minister and educator who was the first president of Jackson State University.

== Biography ==
Ayer was born in Charlestown, Massachusetts on March 16, 1826 to William and Hannah (Fosdick) Ayer. He began his college studies at Amherst College, but transferred to Colgate University (then known as Madison College), and graduated in 1849. In 1851, he married Elizabeth Fish in Amherst, Massachusetts. They had four children, three of whom predeceased Ayer. Elizabeth Ayer died on April 24, 1900.

After two years of study at the Newton Theological Institution, Ayer was ordained in Turner, Maine. He subsequently held pastorships in Brunswick, Maine (1853–1856, 1859–1860), Southborough, Massachusetts (1856–1859), Athol, Massachusetts (1861–1863), and Sterling, Massachusetts (1863–1865). He also served as principal of Brunswick High School.

In January 1865, Ayer became the headmaster of the Worcester Academy following the resignation of Ambrose P. S. Stuart. He finished the school year and was appointed to a full-term that August. He resigned at the end of the 1865–66 school year and moved to New York, where he held brief pastorships in Gilbertsville, West Winfield, Morris, Clinton, Baldwinsville, Perry, and Webster.

In 1877, Ayer was appointed principal of the Natchez Seminary, a newly-created school for black students established by the American Baptist Home Mission Society. In 1883, the school relocated to Jackson, Mississippi and became Jackson College. One of the buildings at the new campus, Ayer Hall, was named in Ayer's honor.

In 1894, Ayer was appointed principal of the Clifton Springs Seminary in Clifton Springs, New York. From 1896 to 1898, he was a pastor in Hinesburg, Vermont. He retired to Clinton, New York, where he died on March 28, 1901 from heart disease.
