= Covington County Courthouse =

- U.S. National Register of Historic Places
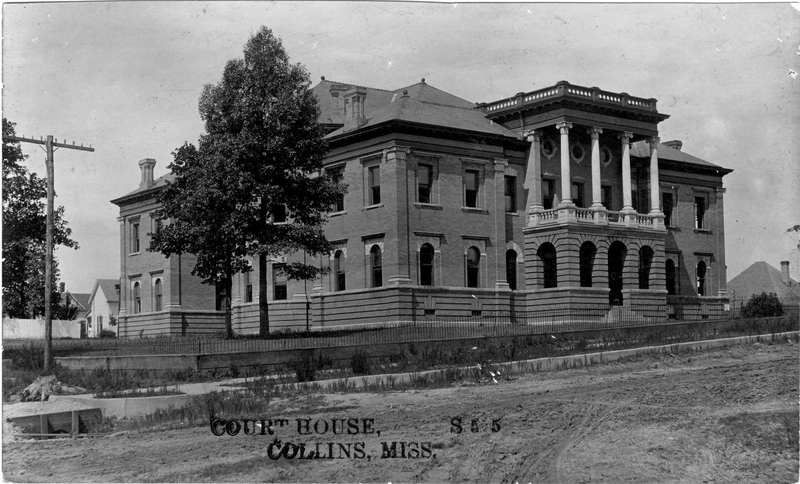

- Location within Mississippi Location within the United States
- Interactive map showing the location of Covington County Courthouse
- Location: Dogwood Ave., Collins, Mississippi
- Coordinates: 31°38′37″N 89°33′24″W
- Area: 1.3 acres (0.53 ha)
- Built: 1907
- Built by: J.B. Carr & Co.
- Architect: W.S. Hull
- Architectural style: Classical Revival
- NRHP reference No.: 91001894
- Added to NRHP: December 31, 1991

Covington County Courthouse is a historic county courthouse in Collins, Mississippi, county seat of Covington County, Mississippi.

== History ==
It was built in 1906, completed in 1907, and first used in 1908.

The courthouse was added to the National Register of Historic Places on December 31, 1991. It is located on Dogwood Avenue.

== See also ==
- National Register of Historic Places listings in Mississippi § Covington County
