= Magnolia Commercial Historic District =

Historic district in Arkansas, United States

- U.S. National Register of Historic Places
- U.S. Historic district
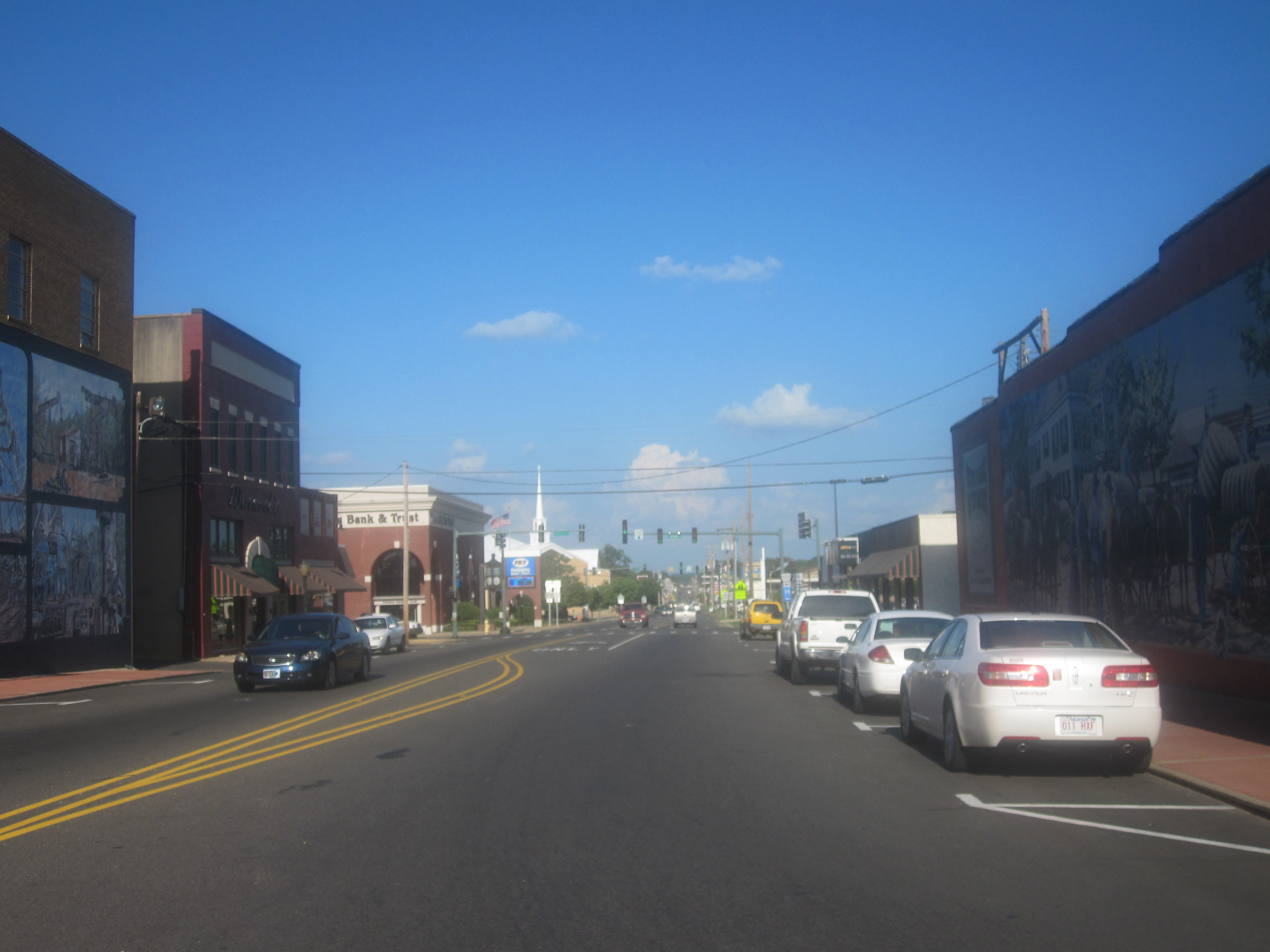

- Location within Arkansas Location within the United States
- Location: Roughly bounded by Madison Ave., Calhoun St., Jackson Ave.& Union St., Magnolia, Arkansas
- Coordinates: 33°16′2″N 93°14′27″W
- Area: 10 acres (4.0 ha)
- Built: 1899
- Architect: W.S. Hull, Ginocchio & Cromwell
- Architectural style: Early Commercial, Art Deco
- NRHP reference No.: 08000435
- Added to NRHP: May 20, 2008

The Magnolia Commercial Historic District encompasses the historic heart of Magnolia, the county seat of Columbia County, Arkansas. It includes the courthouse square and most of the buildings which face it, as well as buildings along Calhoun and Jackson Streets. The centerpiece of the district is the square itself and the Columbia County Courthouse, a Renaissance Revival structure built in 1905 to a design by W. S. Hull. The square is lined with mostly brick-faced buildings built between about 1899 and 1910, and between 1938 and 1958, when the city experienced a second building boom. The oldest known surviving building, then as now housing a pharmacy, is located at 111 S. Court Square. One prominent building from the second building phase is the Cameo Theater Building (111 N. Jackson), an Art Deco design built in 1948.

The district was listed on the National Register of Historic Places in 2008.

== See also ==
- National Register of Historic Places listings in Columbia County, Arkansas
