= Columbia County Courthouse (Arkansas) =

- U.S. National Register of Historic Places
- U.S. Historic district – Contributing property
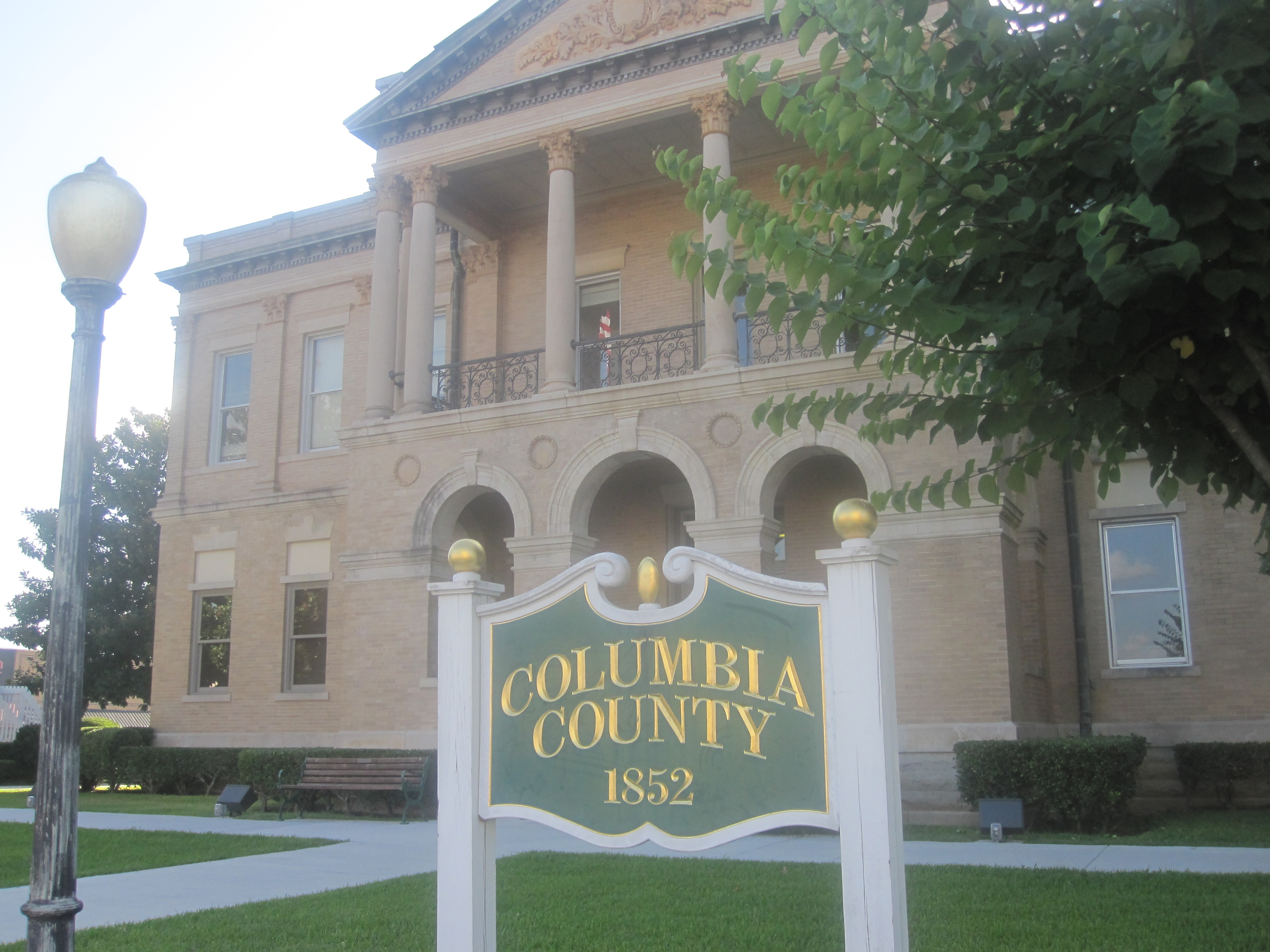
- Columbia County Courthouse

- Location within Arkansas Location within the United States
- Interactive map showing the location of Columbia County Courthouse
- Location: Court Sq., Magnolia, Arkansas
- Coordinates: 33°16′02″N 93°14′27″W
- Built: 1905
- Architect: Hall, W.W.
- Architectural style: Late 19th And 20th Century Revivals, Second Renaissance Revival
- Part of: Magnolia Commercial Historic District (ID08000435)
- NRHP reference No.: 78000580

Significant dates
- Added to NRHP: April 15, 1978
- Designated CP: May 20, 2008

The Columbia County Courthouse is located at Court Square in the heart of Magnolia, the county seat of Columbia County, Arkansas. The two-story brick and stone structure was designed W. W. Hall and built in 1905. It features Renaissance Revival styling, with Corinthian pilasters separating the windows on the second level and a projecting Greek temple portico with recessed entries under round arches on the first level, and fluted Corinthian columns on the second.

African-American man, Jordan Jameson was lynched on November 11, 1919, in the town square right in the front of the Columbia County Courthouse. A large white mob seized Jameson after he allegedly shot the local sheriff. They tied him to a stake and burned him alive meters from the building.

The building was listed on the National Register of Historic Places in 1978.

== See also ==
- National Register of Historic Places listings in Columbia County, Arkansas
