= Jackson State University =

Public historically black university in Jackson, Mississippi, U.S.

- Former names: Natchez Seminary (1877–1883); Jackson College (1883–1940); Mississippi Negro Training School (1940–1944); Jackson College for Negro Teachers (1944–1967); Jackson State College (1967–1974)
- Motto: Excellentia academia investigatio et officium (Latin)
- Motto in English: "Academic excellence in research and service"
- Type: Public historically black research university
- Established: October 23, 1877; 149 years ago
- Parent institution: Mississippi Institutions of Higher Learning
- Accreditation: SACS
- Academic affiliations: CUMU; ORAU; TMCF; sea-grant; space-grant
- Endowment: $60 million (2019)
- President: Denise Jones Gregory
- Faculty: 337 full time, 212 part time (fall 2022)
- Administrative staff: 687 (fall 2020)
- Students: 6,564 (fall 2023)
- Undergraduates: 4,769 (fall 2023)
- Postgraduates: 1,795 (fall 2023)
- Location: Jackson, Mississippi, United States; 32°17′46″N 090°12′28″W
- Campus: 220 acres (0.89 km^{2}); Midsize city
- Newspaper: The Blue & White Flash
- Colors: Navy blue and white
- Nickname: Tigers
- Sporting affiliations: NCAA Division I FCS – SWAC
- Mascot: Bengal Tiger
- Website: jsums.edu
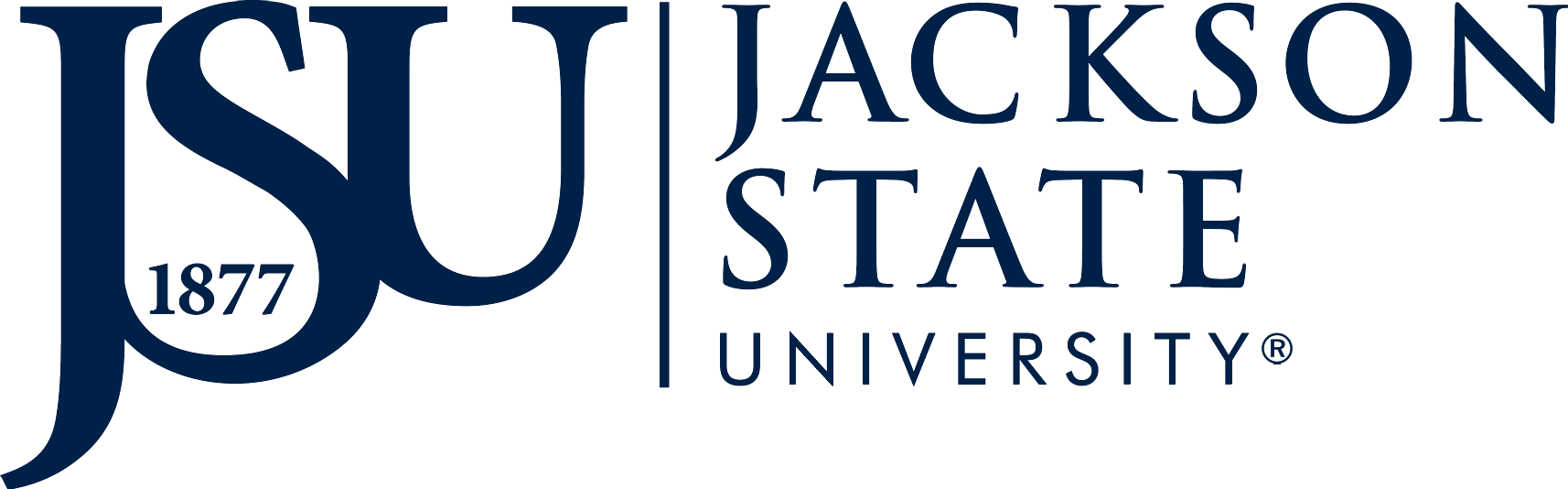

Jackson State University (Jackson State or JSU) is a public historically black research university in Jackson, Mississippi. It is a member of the Thurgood Marshall College Fund and classified among "R2: Doctoral Universities – High research activity".

Jackson State University's athletic teams, the Tigers, participate in NCAA Division I athletics as a member of the Southwestern Athletic Conference (SWAC). Jackson State is also the home of the Sonic Boom of the South, a marching band founded in the 1940s. Their accompanying danceline, the Prancing J-Settes, are known for their unique style of dance, known as "J-Setting".

== History ==
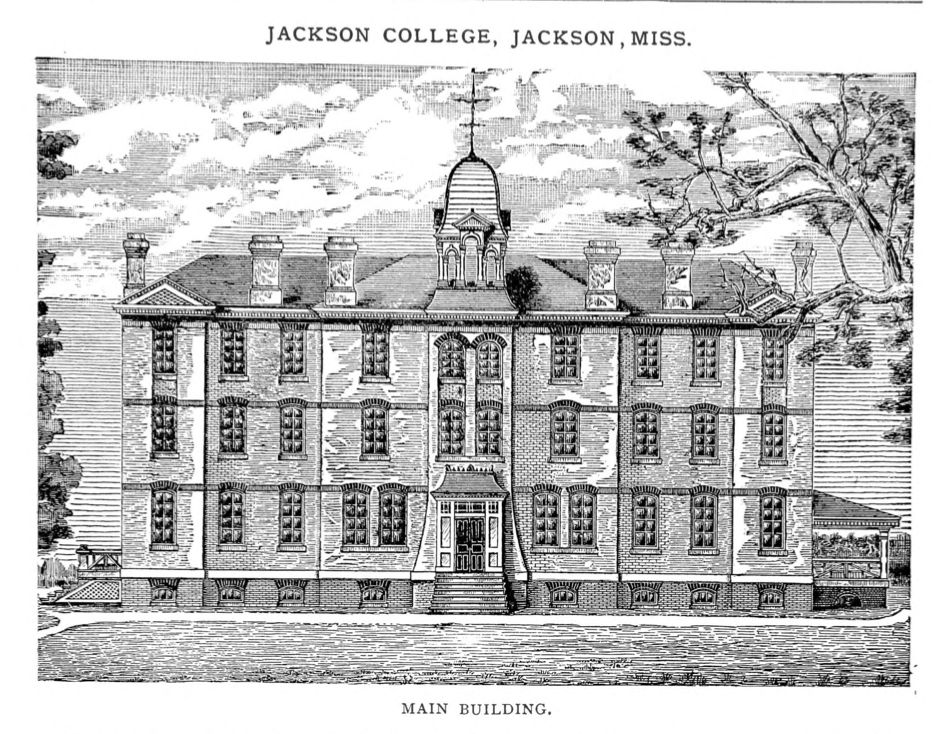
Jackson College in 1889

Jackson State University developed from Natchez Seminary, founded October 23, 1877, in Natchez, Mississippi. The seminary was affiliated with the American Baptist Home Mission Society of New York, who established it "for the moral, religious, and intellectual improvement of Christian leaders of the colored people of Mississippi and the neighboring states". In 1883, the school changed its name to Jackson College and moved from Natchez to a site in Jackson, the capital. The college moved to its current location early in the 20th century, where it developed into a full state university. Its original site in Jackson is now the location of Millsaps College.

In 1934, during the Great Depression, the Baptist Society withdrew financial support. The school became a state-supported public institution in 1940 as the Mississippi Negro Training School. The name has changed over time: Jackson College for Negro Teachers in 1944;. Jackson State College in 1967, after desegregation; and with the addition of graduate programs and expanded curriculum, Jackson State University in 1974.

Many students at Jackson State College became active in the civil rights movement. Work to gain integrated practice and social justice continued after civil rights legislation was passed in the mid-1960s. During an on-campus protest on May 14, 1970, two students were killed by police gunfire, and an additional 12 students injured by gunfire. A dormitory still bears the bullet marks fired on that day.

The university drew national attention in 2023 when the faculty senate voted "no confidence" in university president Thomas Hudson. They alleged that he "repeatedly failed to respect shared governance, transparency, and accountability". Shortly thereafter, the university's board of trustees placed Hudson on administrative leave and appointed Elayne Hayes-Anthony the acting president.

== Campuses ==
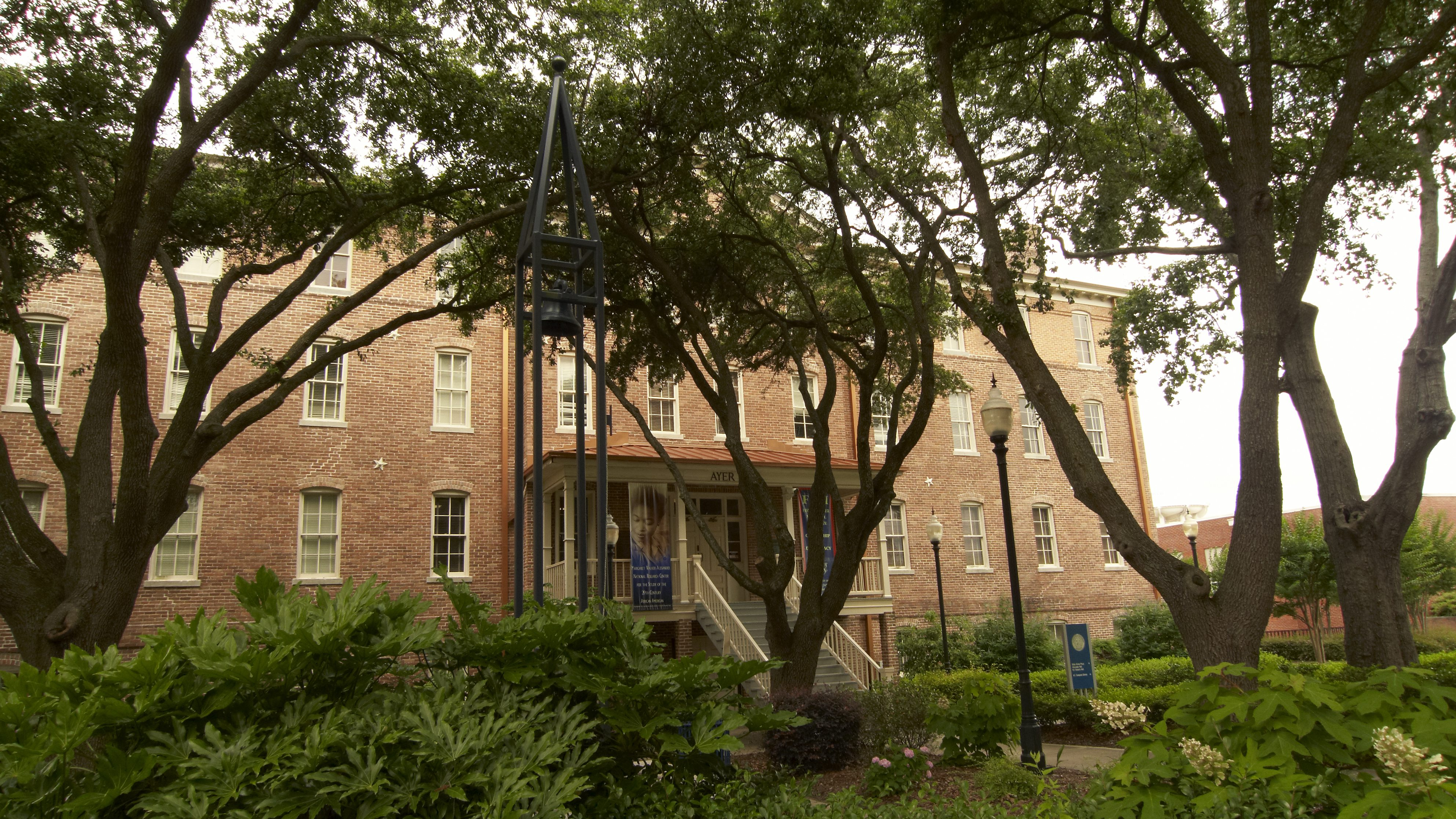
Ayer Hall on main campus

The main campus contains over 50 academic and administrative buildings on 245 acres (0.99 km^{2}). It is located at 1400 John R. Lynch Street between Prentiss and Dalton Streets.

Ayer Hall was constructed in 1903 and is the oldest structure on the main campus. It was named in honor of the first president of the institution, Charles Ayer. The building was listed on the National Register of Historic Places in 1977. Gibbs-Green Pedestrian Walkway was named in honor of the two young men who died in the Jackson State shooting in 1970. As a result of the landmark "Ayers Settlement" in 2002, the university, along with the other two public HBCUs in the state, has completed extensive renovations and upgrades to campus.

Jackson State has satellite campuses throughout the Jackson Metropolitan area:

- Universities Center (Ridgewood Road)
- Jackson Medical Mall (Woodrow Wilson)
- Mississippi E-Center
- Downtown (100 Capitol Street)

== Organization and administration ==
=== Governance ===
The board of trustees is the constitutional governing body of the Mississippi State Institutions of Higher Learning. This body appoints the president of the university. There are 575 faculty and 1,431 staff; 54% of the faculty are tenured, teaching approximately 6,500 undergraduate and graduate students.

=== Presidents ===
1. 1877–1894: Charles Ayer
2. 1894–1911: Luther G. Barrett
3. 1911–1927: Zachary T. Hubert
4. 1927–1940: Buddy Baldwin Dansby
5. 1940–1967: Jacob L. Reddix
6. 1967–1984: John A. Peoples Jr.
7. 1984–1991: James A. Hefner
8. 1992–1999: James E. Lyons Sr.
9. 2000–2010: Ronald Mason Jr.
10. 2010: Leslie Burl McLemore (interim)
11. 2011–2016: Carolyn Meyers
12. 2016–2017: Rod Paige (interim)
13. 2017–2020: William B. Bynum
14. 2020–2023: Thomas Hudson
15. 2023: Elayne Hayes–Anthony (acting)
16. 2023–2025: Marcus L. Thompson
17. 2025–present: Denise Jones Gregory

== Academics ==
Academic rankings

National
- U.S. News & World Report: 363 of 436
- Washington Monthly: 102 of 438

JSU colleges and schools include:

- College of Business
- College of Education and Human Development
- College of Liberal Arts
- College of Health Sciences
- College of Science, Engineering and Technology
- W.E.B. Du Bois – Maria Luisa Alvarez Harvey Honors College
- School of Public Health
- School of Lifelong Learning

=== Teaching and learning ===
In 2015, JSU became the first university in Mississippi approved by the legislature to establish a School of Public Health which is housed under the College of Health Sciences. JSU is the only university in Mississippi to earn two consecutive "Apple Distinguished School" distinctions from Apple Inc. Since 2012, Jackson State University has provided all first-time, full-time freshmen brand new iPads. JSU is the first and only HBCU in Mississippi to support a bachelor's and master's level engineering program. The W.E.B. Du Bois – Maria Luisa Alvarez Harvey Honors College is a selective interdisciplinary college at the university for the most high-achieving undergraduate students.

=== Academic centers ===
- The Margaret Walker Center is dedicated to the preservation, interpretation, and dissemination of African American culture.
- The COFO Civil Rights Education Center focuses on civil rights and developing future leaders.
- The Richard Wright Center was established to help students improve their writing and presentation skills.

=== Military science ===
Tiger Battalion, the university's Army ROTC program is the host US Army ROTC program for Belhaven University, Delta State University, Hinds Community College, Millsaps College, Mississippi College, Mississippi College School of Law, Mississippi Valley State University, Tougaloo College, and University of Mississippi Medical Center's School of Nursing. Air Force Detachment 006 is the Air Force ROTC Component for the Jackson metropolitan area. Hosted at Jackson State, it also serves students from Belhaven University, Millsaps College, Mississippi College and Tougaloo College.

== Athletics ==
Jackson State is a member of the Division I Football Championship Subdivision (FCS) and the Southwestern Athletic Conference. JSU fields teams in basketball, track and field, cross country, baseball, softball, golf, tennis, soccer, bowling, volleyball, and football. The university's mascot is the Tiger, and the teams are sometimes referred to as the "Blue Bengals".

Official athletics logo

=== Football ===
JSU athletics is historically most well known for its football program. JSU Tigers football alumni include Pro Football Hall of Famers Lem Barney, Jackie Slater, Walter Payton, Robert Brazile, and Jimmy Smith.

JSU participates in a number of notable football games with rival colleges. These include:

- Jackson State's annual homecoming football game, one of the highest attended and most anticipated home games
- BoomBox Classic – played against Southern University on a rotating home-and-home schedule
- Soul Bowl (formerly Capital City Classic) – played against Alcorn State on a rotating home-and-home schedule

=== Basketball ===
As of 2024, JSU men's basketball has won five SWAC titles and made three NCAA Division I men's basketball tournament appearances.

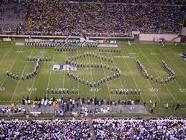
The Sonic Boom of the South at halftime in Mississippi Veterans Memorial Stadium

=== Sonic Boom of the South ===
The marching band began in the 1940s at what was then Jackson State College, under the directorship of Frederick D. Hall, who had directed a band at the college as early as the 1920s, in addition to the chorus and orchestra. It was initially made up of students from Jackson College and Lanier High School. Founded as the Jackson State University Marching Band, the name "Sonic Boom of the South" was adopted by the school in 1971, after being suggested by band members.

The first full-time band director, William W. Davis, was appointed in 1948, replacing Charles Saulsburg, who had been director since 1947. Davis had previously played trumpet in Cab Calloway's band, and Calloway's musical style and showmanship influenced Davis's conceptualization of the marching band. The band at this time had around 20 members, increasing to 88 in 1963. Davis retired as director in 1971, but remained the chief arranger for the band. He was replaced by Harold J. Haughton. Haughton was instrumental in the creation of the Prancing J-Settes, the band's accompanying danceline.

== Student life ==
Undergraduate demographics as of fall 2023
Race and ethnicity	Total
Black	95%
White	2%
International student	1%
Two or more races	1%
Economic diversity
Low-income (Note: The percentage of students who received an income-based federal Pell grant intended for low-income students.)	67%
Affluent (Note: The percentage of students who are a part of the American middle class at the bare minimum.)	33%

=== Student body ===
In fall 2022, Jackson State's total enrollment was 6,906, of whom 4,927 were undergraduate students and 1,979 were graduate.

As of fall 2020, 67% of Jackson State's student community were Mississippi residents, with the majority from Hinds County and Madison County. The top three feeder states were Illinois (409 students), Louisiana (269), and Georgia (220). Nigeria accounted for the highest number of international students on campus. 91% of students identified as Black, 6% identified as white, and 4% identified with various race categories. 31% of students were male, and 69% of students were female.

=== Student organizations ===
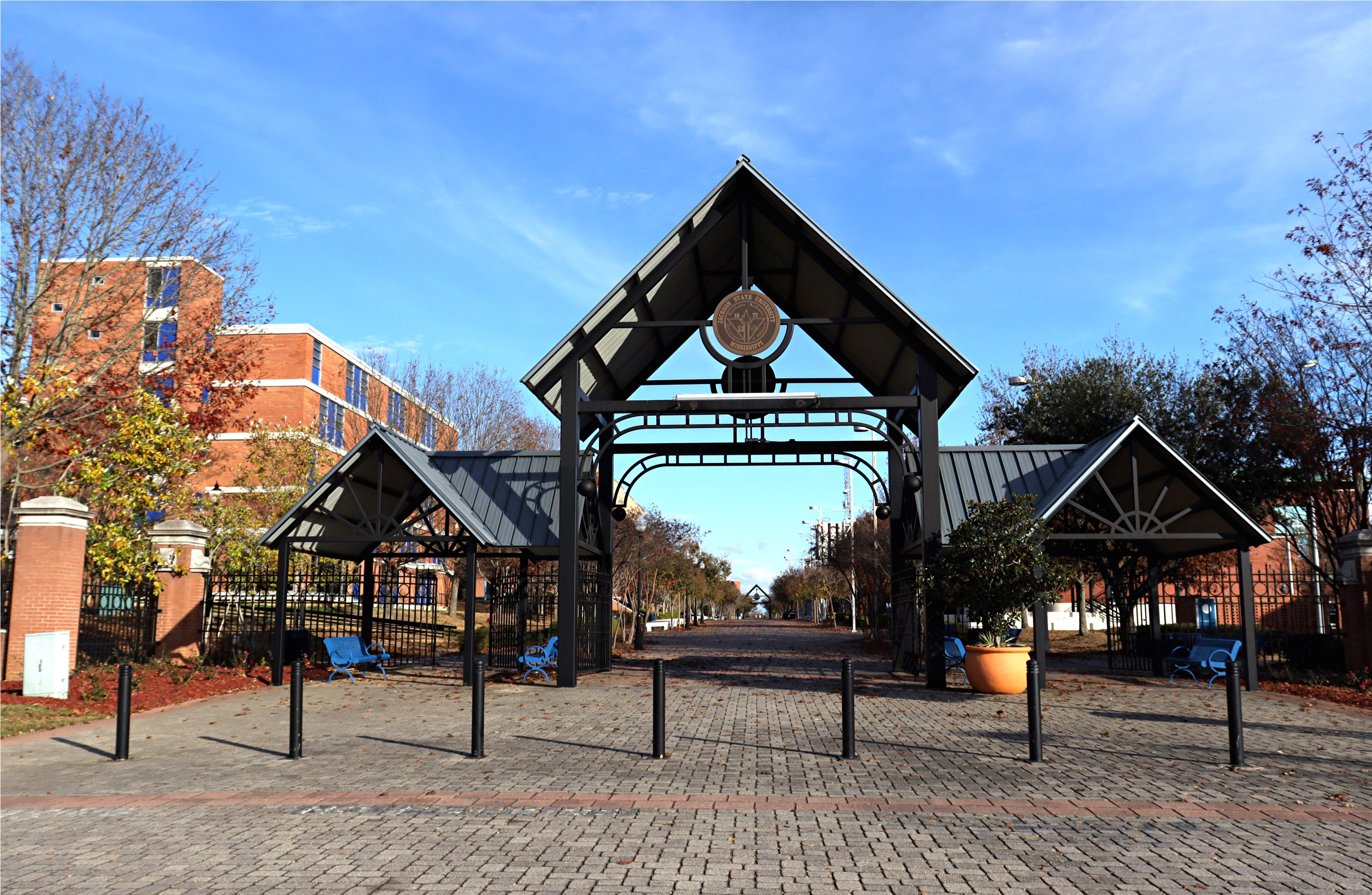
Entrance of JSU's Gibbs-Green Memorial Plaza

Jackson State University offers over 60 registered student organizations. There are academic, residential, religious, Greek, and special interest groups. All student organizations are governed under the Student Affairs division.

=== Campus media ===
Jackson State is home to radio station WJSU-88.5 FM which plays jazz, gospel, news, and public affairs programming. The television station W23BC is known as JSUTV and aired on Comcast. The independent weekly student newspaper is called Blue and White Flash and the Jacksonian magazine features news and highlights about the university.

== Notable alumni ==
Notable JSU alumni

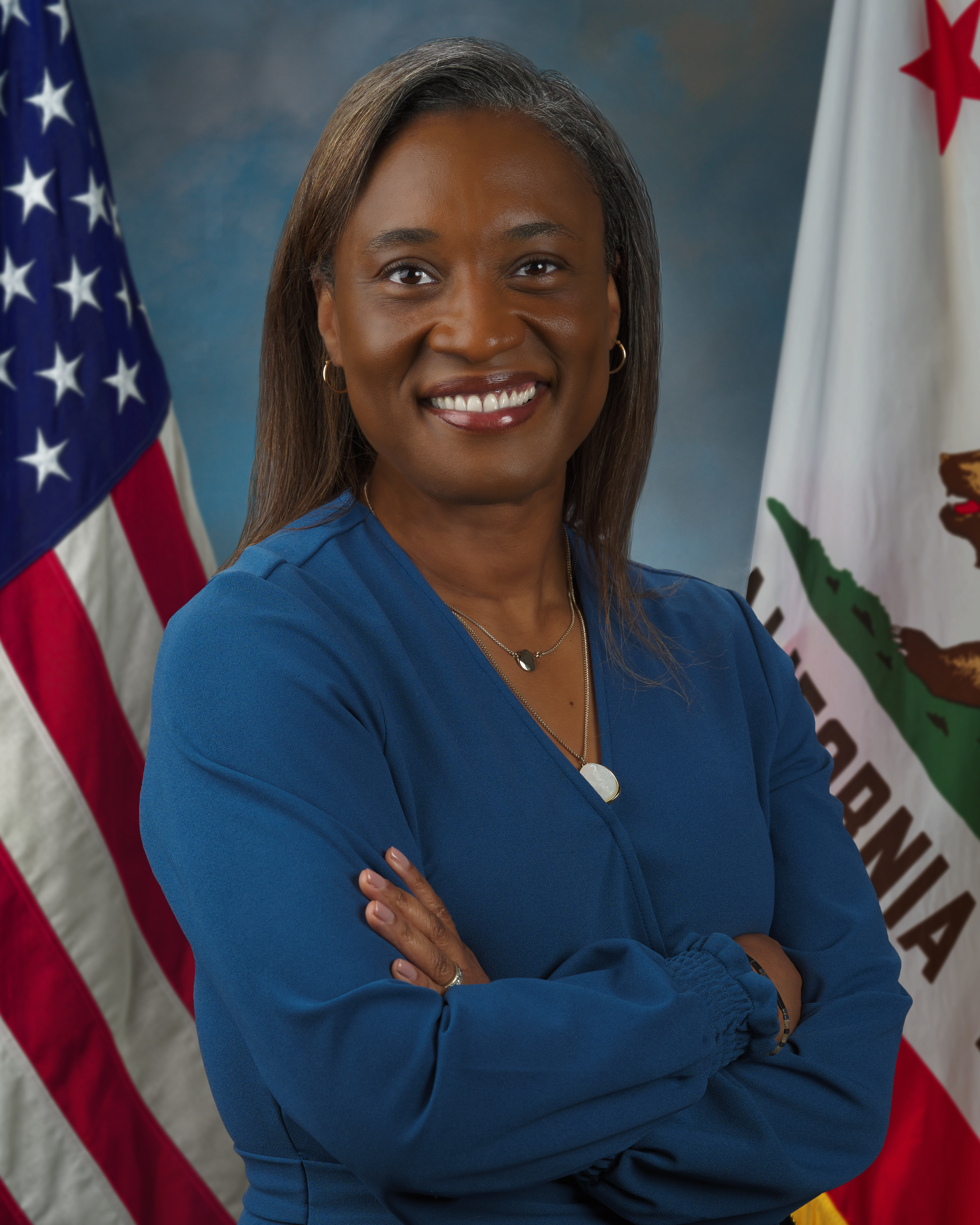
Laphonza Butler
United States senator from California, 2023–2024

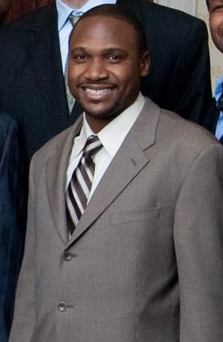
Lindsey Hunter
Basketball player, 2-time NBA Champion

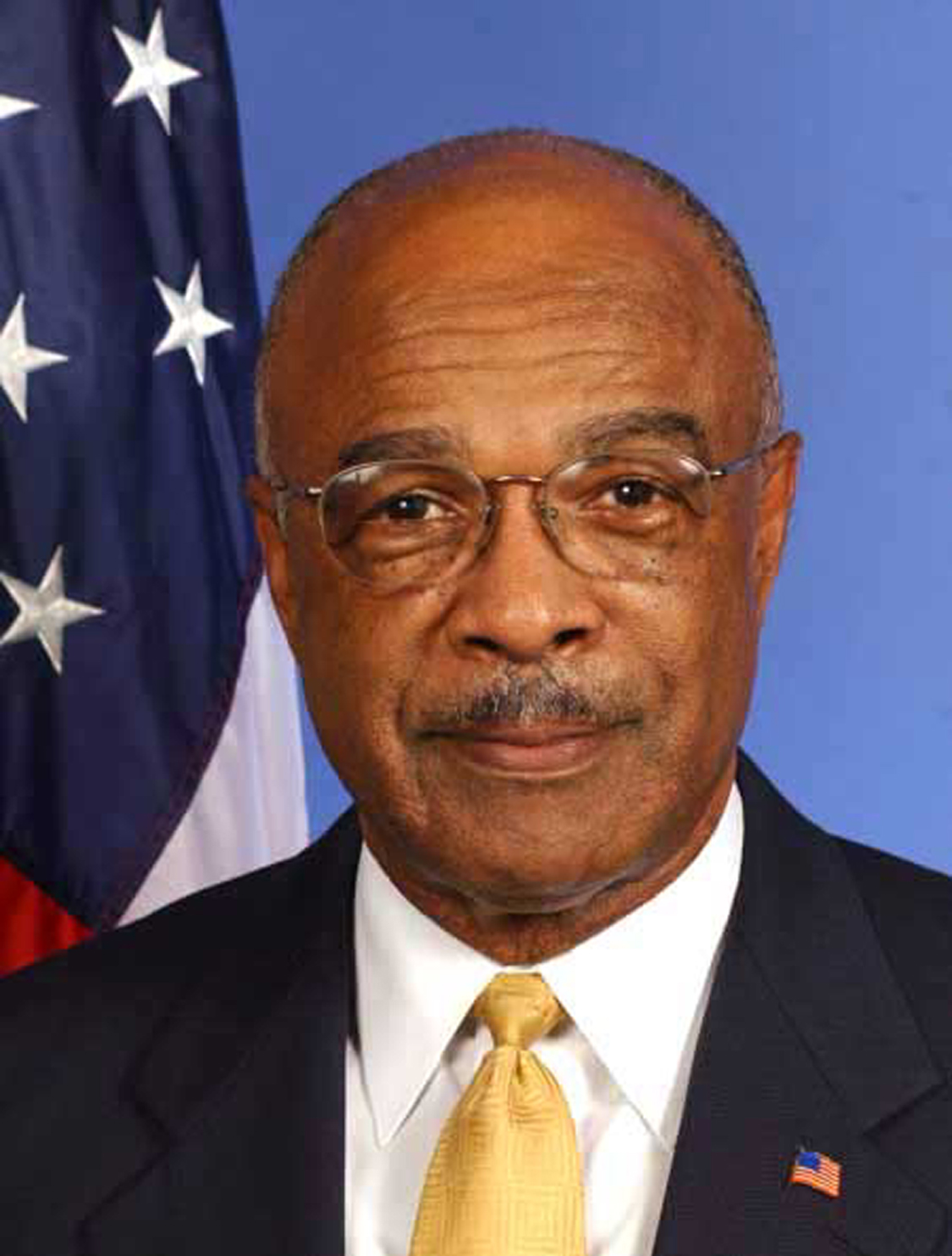
Rod Paige
United States Secretary of Education, 2001–2005

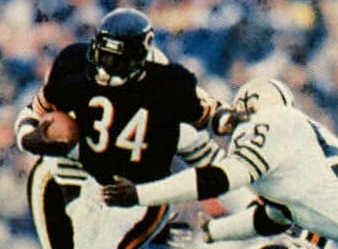
Walter Payton
American football player, 9-time Pro Bowler, Hall of Fame

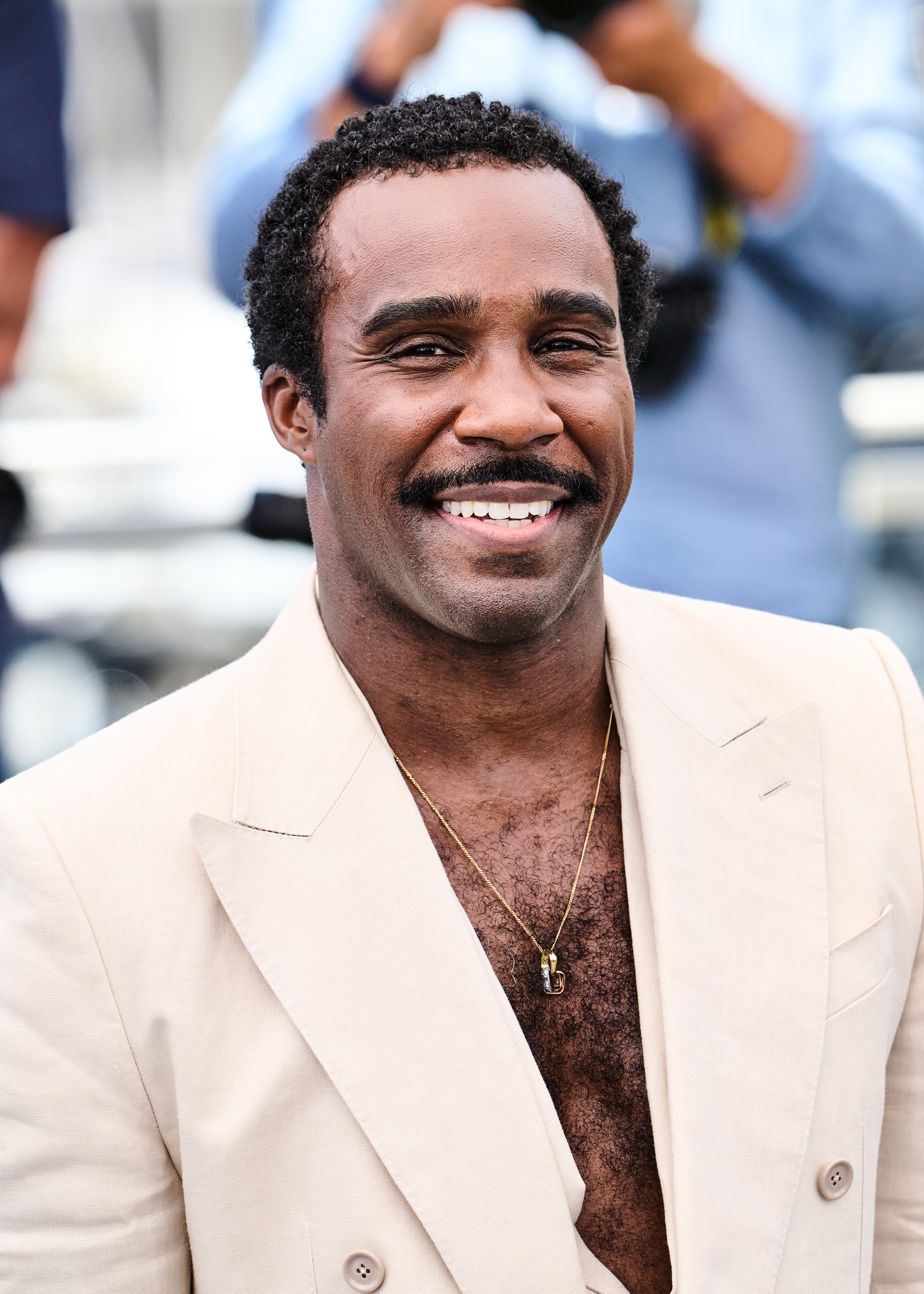
Tramell Tillman
Actor

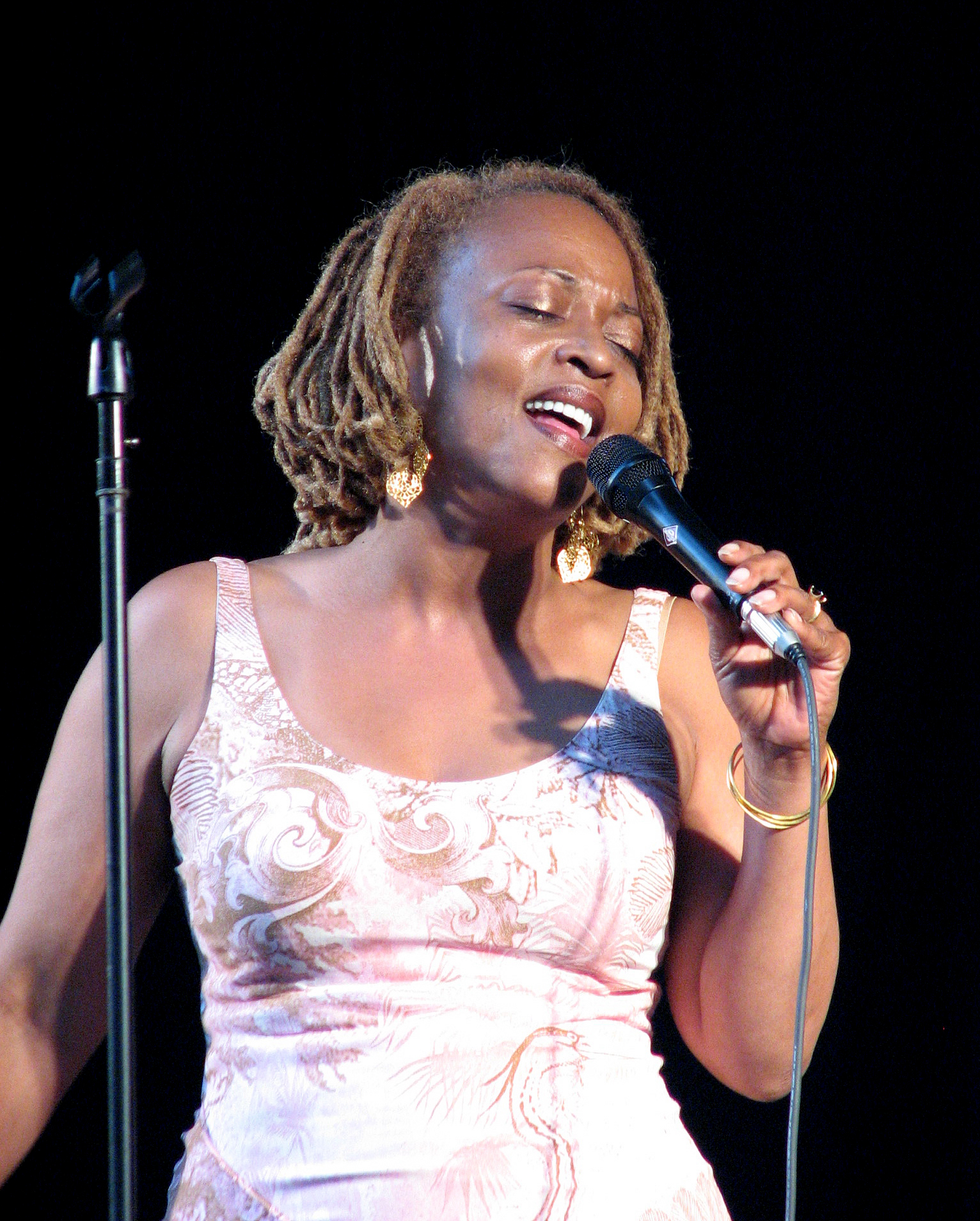
Cassandra Wilson
Singer, 2-time Grammy winner

=== Education ===
Name	Class year	Notability	Reference(s)
Charlotte P. Morris	1970	Interim president of Tuskegee University (2010; 2017–2018)	
Rod Paige	1955	First African-American to serve as Secretary of Education during Bush administration (2001–2005), former head football coach at Jackson State (1964–1968), and interim president of JSU (2016–2017)	
Mary L. Smith	1957	11th president of Kentucky State University (1991–1998)	

=== Arts, entertainment, and music ===
Name	Class year	Notability	Reference(s)
Derrick Barnes	1999	Children's author and illustrator	
Vivian Brown	1986	Television meteorologist	
Tobias Dorzon		Chef, television personality, restaurateur, and former professional football player	
Percy Greene		Founding editor of the Jackson Advocate newspaper, Mississippi's oldest black-owned newspaper	
Lester Julian Merriweather	2000	Memphis-based visual artist, collagist	
Demarco Morgan	2001	Former news anchor for KCBS-TV in Los Angeles, ABC News, and GMA: The Third Hour	
Willie Norwood		Gospel singer, father and voice coach of R&B singers Brandy and Ray J	
Sekou Smith	1997	Sportswriter, reported on the NBA	
Tonea Stewart	1969	Actress and educator	
Tramell Tillman	2008	Actor	
Cassandra Wilson	1980	Jazz vocalist and musician	Wisdom Martin/year= 1992 /Emmy award winning news anchor and author WUSA 9 Washington DC

=== Politics, law, and government ===
Name	Class year	Notability	Reference(s)
Felicia C. Adams	1981	United States attorney for the United States District Court for the Northern District of Mississippi 2011–2017	
Arekia Bennett		Voting rights activist, executive director of Mississippi Votes	
Cornell William Brooks	1983	Yale-trained lawyer, 18th president and CEO of the NAACP	
Emmett C. Burns, Jr.		Member of the Maryland House of Delegates from the 10th district	
Laphonza Butler	2001	United States senator from California (2023–2024)	
Robert G. Clark, Jr.	1952	Politician; elected to the Mississippi House of Representatives in 1967; first African American elected to the Mississippi State Legislature since the Reconstruction era	
Dennis Deer		2nd district Cook County Commissioner	
Carlton W. Reeves	1986	Judge of the United States District Court for the Southern District of Mississippi	
Bennie G. Thompson	1973	Member U. S. House of Representatives (1993–present)	
Tony Yarber	2004	Mayor of Jackson, Mississippi	

=== Sports ===
Name	Class year	Notability	Reference(s)
Shasta Averyhardt	2008	Professional golfer, first African-American woman to qualify for the LPGA Tour since 2001, and its fourth African-American woman member in the 60-year history of the tour	
Lem Barney		Pro Football Hall of Fame member, cornerback with the Detroit Lions	
Marcus Benard	2009	Former NFL linebacker	
Dennis "Oil Can" Boyd		Former Major League Baseball pitcher	
Robert Braddy		Jackson State Tigers baseball player and coach	
Corey Bradford		Former National Football League wide receiver	
Robert Brazile		Pro Football Hall of Fame member, 7-time NFL Pro Bowl outside linebacker with the Houston Oilers	
Wes Chamberlain		Former Major Leaguer outfielder	
Dave Clark		Former Major League outfielder	
Darion Conner		American football player convicted of vehicular homicide	
Archie "Gunslinger" Cooley	1962	Former head football coach at Mississippi Valley State University, University of Arkansas–Pine Bluff, Norfolk State University, and Paul Quinn College	
Leslie "Speedy" Duncan		Former 4-time NFL Pro-Bowl cornerback with the San Diego Chargers and Washington Redskins	
Marvin Freeman		Former Major League pitcher	
Cletis Gordon		Former NFL defensive back	
Roy Hilton	1965	Former NFL defensive end	
Lindsey Hunter		Former NBA point guard. Won the 2001–02 championship with the Los Angeles Lakers and the 2003–04 championship with the Detroit Pistons; formerly interim heach coach of the Phoenix Suns	
Travis Hunter	2022	2024 Heisman Trophy recipient, first HBCU alum recipient	
Harold Jackson		Former Jackson State head football coach; former NFL wide receiver; played majority of career with the Los Angeles Rams and New England Patriots	
Claudis James		Former NFL player	
Jaymar Johnson	2008	Current NFL wide receiver	
Trey Johnson		Current NBA/NBA Development League player	
Robert Kent		Jackson State and professional quarterback	
Ed Manning		Drafted by the Baltimore Bullets in the eighth round (1st pick, 80th overall) of the 1967 NBA draft, father of Danny Manning	
Picasso Nelson		Gridiron football player	
Audie Norris		Former NBA Power forward and superstar for Winterthur FC Barcelona in the late 1980s	
Eddie Payton	1973	NFL kick returner; current Jackson State golf coach	
Walter Payton	1975	Pro Football Hall of Fame member; played entire career as running back for the Chicago Bears	
Donald Reese		NFL player; played for the Miami Dolphins, New Orleans Saints and the San Diego Chargers	
Purvis Short		Former NBA small forward for the Golden State Warriors in the mid-1980s	
Jackie Slater		Pro Football Hall of Fame member; played entire career as offensive tackle with the Los Angeles/St. Louis Rams	
Jimmy Smith		Retired NFL wide receiver; played majority career with the Jacksonville Jaguars	
Karen Taylor		Played professionally in Europe, mother of Stanley Johnson	
Michael Tinsley	2006	Track & field sprinter	
Rickey Young	1975	Retired NFL running back with the San Diego Chargers and Minnesota Vikings	

=== Honorary ===
Name	Class year	Notability	Reference(s)
Michelle Obama	2016	First African-American to serve as First Lady of the United States; received an honorary doctorate from Jackson State University, where she served as the keynote speaker for its 2016 spring undergraduate commencement ceremony	
