= National Register of Historic Places listings in Randolph County, Georgia =

This is a list of properties and districts in Randolph County, Georgia that are listed on the National Register of Historic Places (NRHP).

This National Park Service list is complete through NPS recent listings posted March 21, 2025.

== Current listings ==
	Name on the Register	Image	Date listed	Location	City or town	Description
1	Cuthbert Historic District	Cuthbert Historic District	June 10, 1975 (#75000607)	Centered around U.S. 82 and U.S. 27; 31°46′45″N 84°48′15″W	Cuthbert	
2	Fletcher Henderson House	Fletcher Henderson House	June 17, 1982 (#82002460)	1016 Andrew St. 31°45′49″N 84°47′43″W	Cuthbert	Built in 1888, this house is the birthplace of jazz legend, Fletcher Henderson.
3	Shellman Historic District	Shellman Historic District	August 29, 1985 (#85001935)	Roughly bounded by Dean, Church, Mary Lou, Ward, Pecan and Pine Sts. 31°45′31″N 84°36′51″W	Shellman	
