= Randolph County School District =

School district in Georgia (U.S. state)

Address
- 98 School Dr. Cuthbert, Georgia, 39840-5346; United States
- Coordinates: 31.772835°N 84.784584°W

District information
- Grades: Pre-school - 12
- Superintendent: Dianne Watkins
- Accreditations: Southern Association of Colleges and Schools; Georgia Accrediting Commission

Students and staff
- Enrollment: 1,559
- Faculty: 88

Other information
- Telephone: (229) 732-3601
- Fax: (229) 732-3840
- Website: www.sowegak12.org

The Randolph County School District is a public school district in Randolph County, Georgia. United States, based in Cuthbert. It serves the communities of Coleman, Cuthbert, and Shellman.

== Schools ==
The Randolph County School District has one elementary school, one middle school, and one high school.

- Randolph County Elementary School
- Randolph Clay Middle School
- Randolph Clay High School
