= Cuthbert Historic District =

Historic district in Georgia, United States

- U.S. National Register of Historic Places
- U.S. Historic district
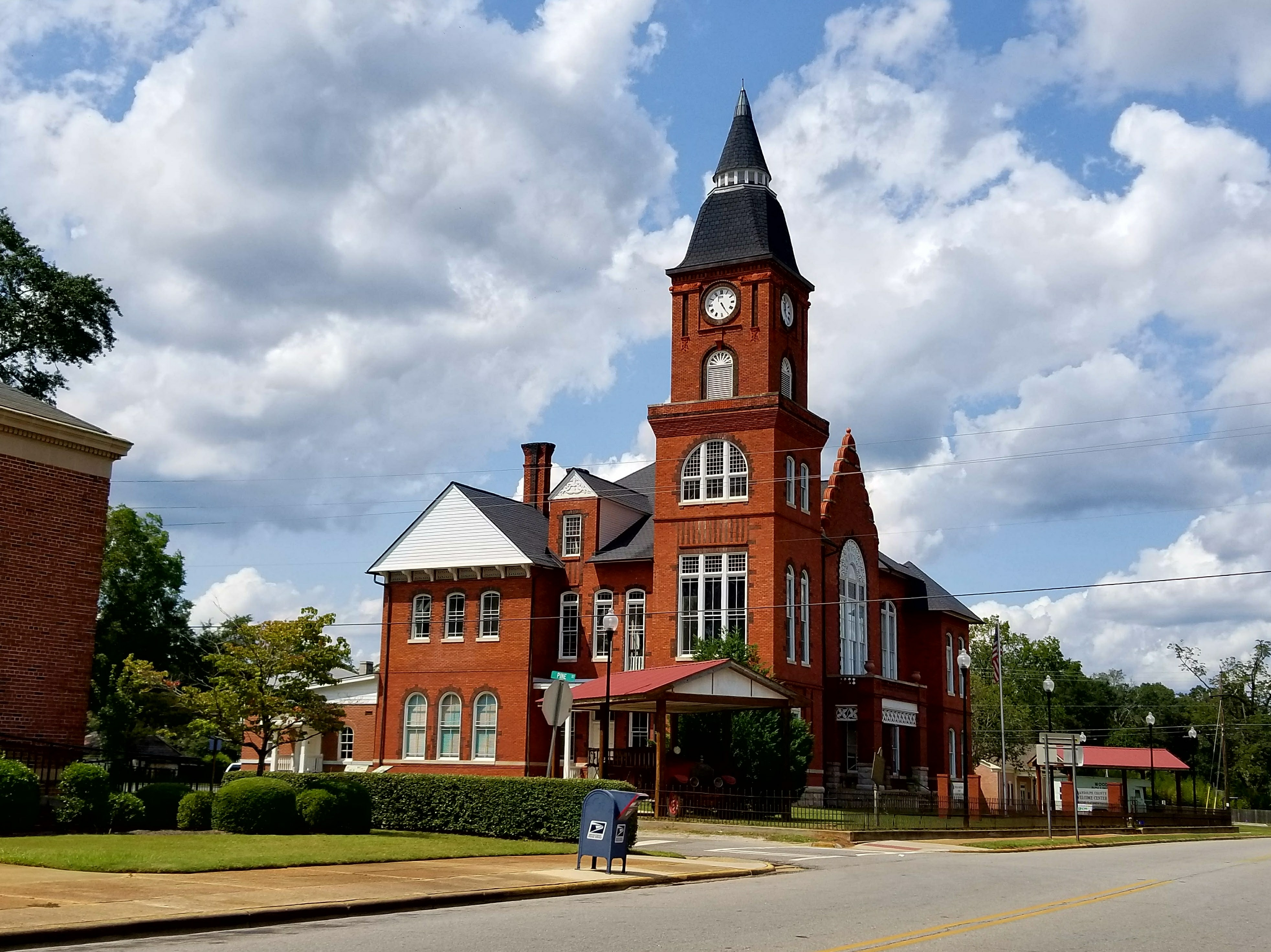
- Randolph County Courthouse - 2017

- Location within Georgia Location within the United States
- Location: Centered around U.S. 82 and U.S. 27, Cuthbert, Georgia
- Coordinates: 31°46′45″N 84°48′15″W
- Area: 315 acres (1.27 km^{2})
- Architect: Multiple
- Architectural style: Greek Revival, Gothic, Plantation Plain
- NRHP reference No.: 75000607
- Added to NRHP: June 10, 1975

Cuthbert Historic District, in Cuthbert in Randolph County, Georgia, is a 315 acres (1.27 km^{2}) historic district which was listed on the National Register of Historic Places in 1975.

It is centered around U.S. 82 and U.S. 27. It includes Greek Revival, Gothic, and Plantation Plain architecture. It includes a courthouse, a college, a hotel, and other properties among its 34 contributing buildings.

The district includes many of the oldest houses in Cuthbert. It includes

- David Rumph Colonial Inn (1837),
- Taylor-Bussey-Castellow House (1846)
- Key House (1842), 305 College Street, built by Jesse Bibb Key with use of his slaves brought from Virginia
- Atkins-Stanford House (1850)
- Douglas-Coffin House (1840s)
- Gunn Brown House
- Harris-Whatley House (1849)

== Gallery ==
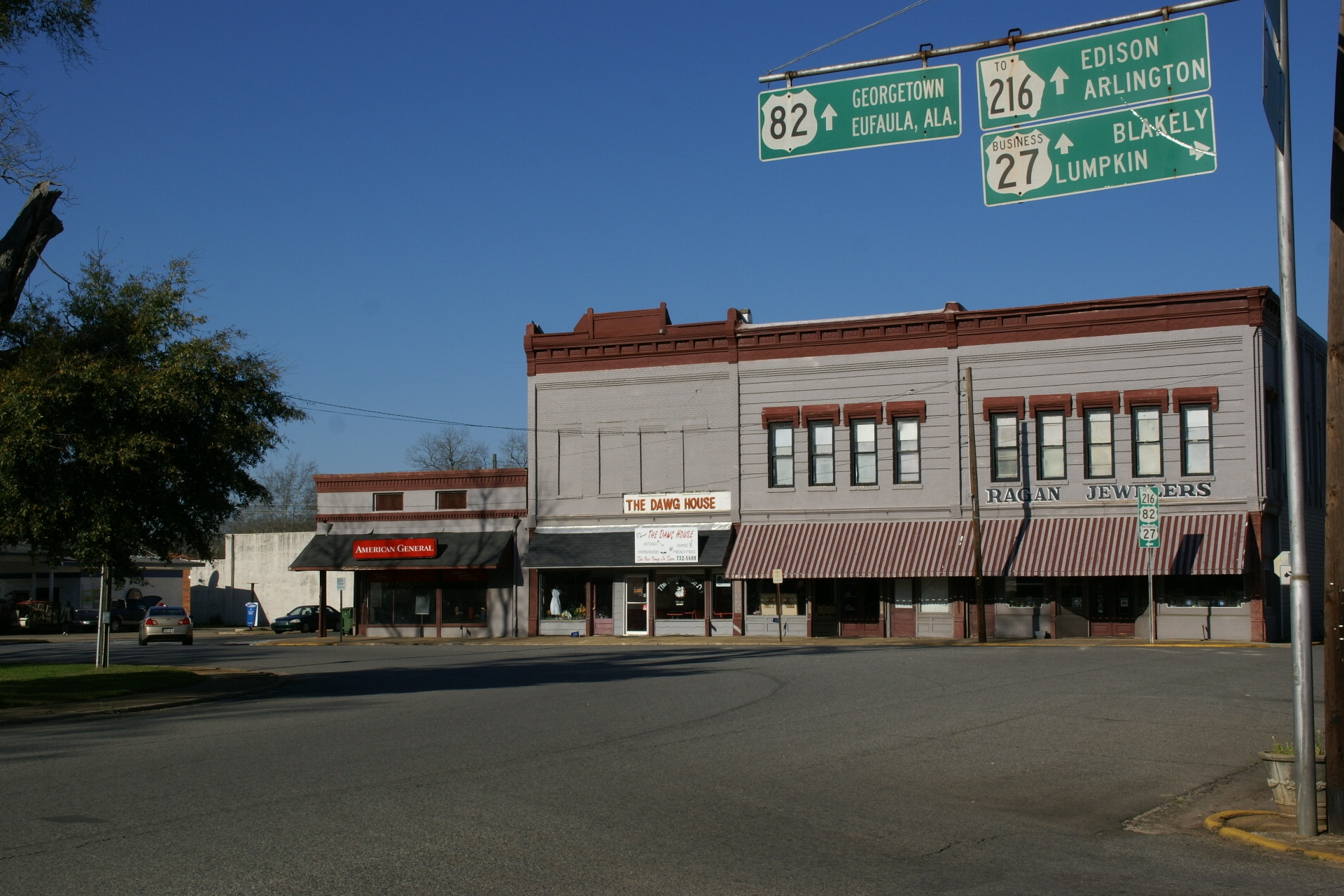
Cuthbert Square - 2011

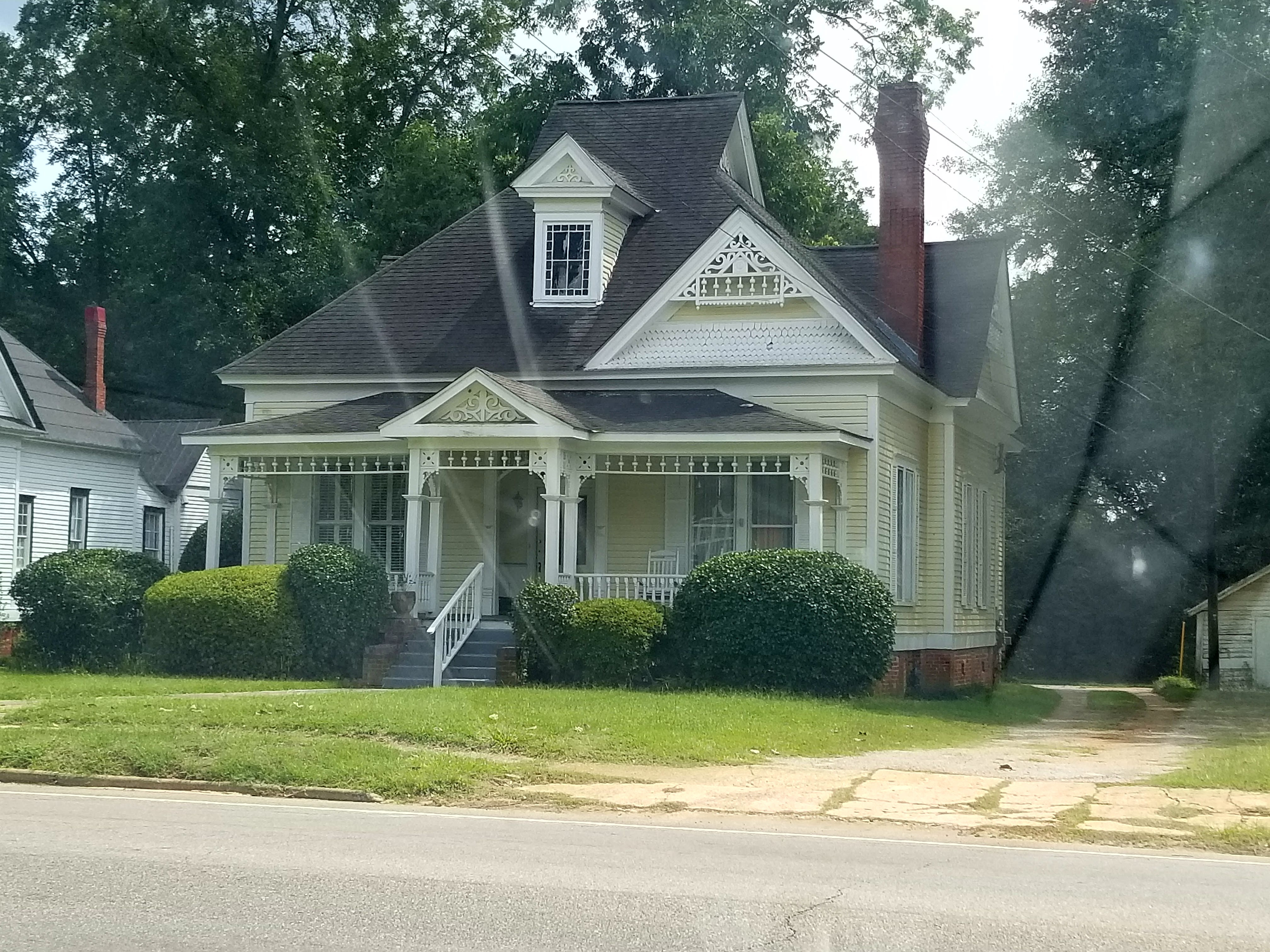

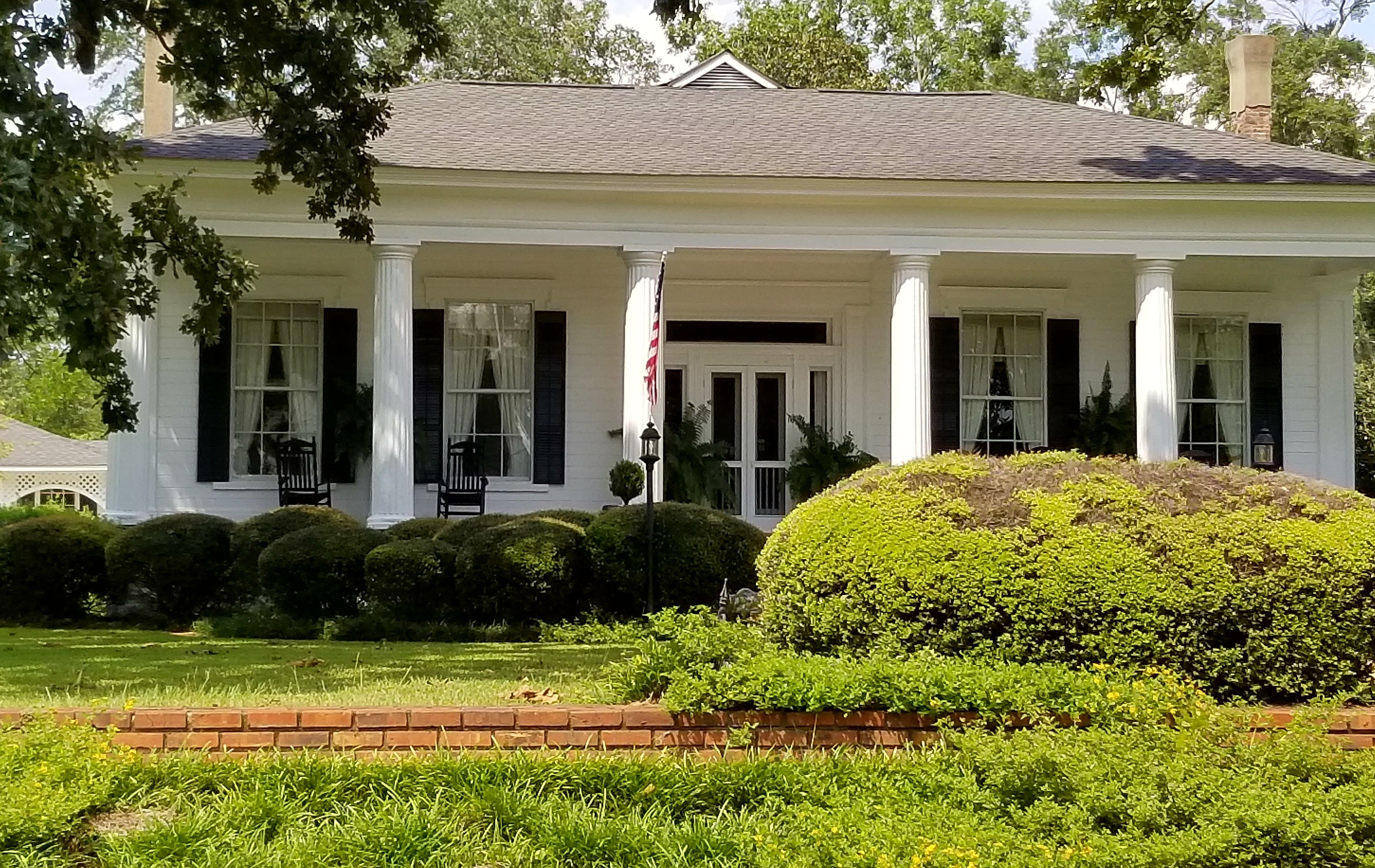
Key House - 2017

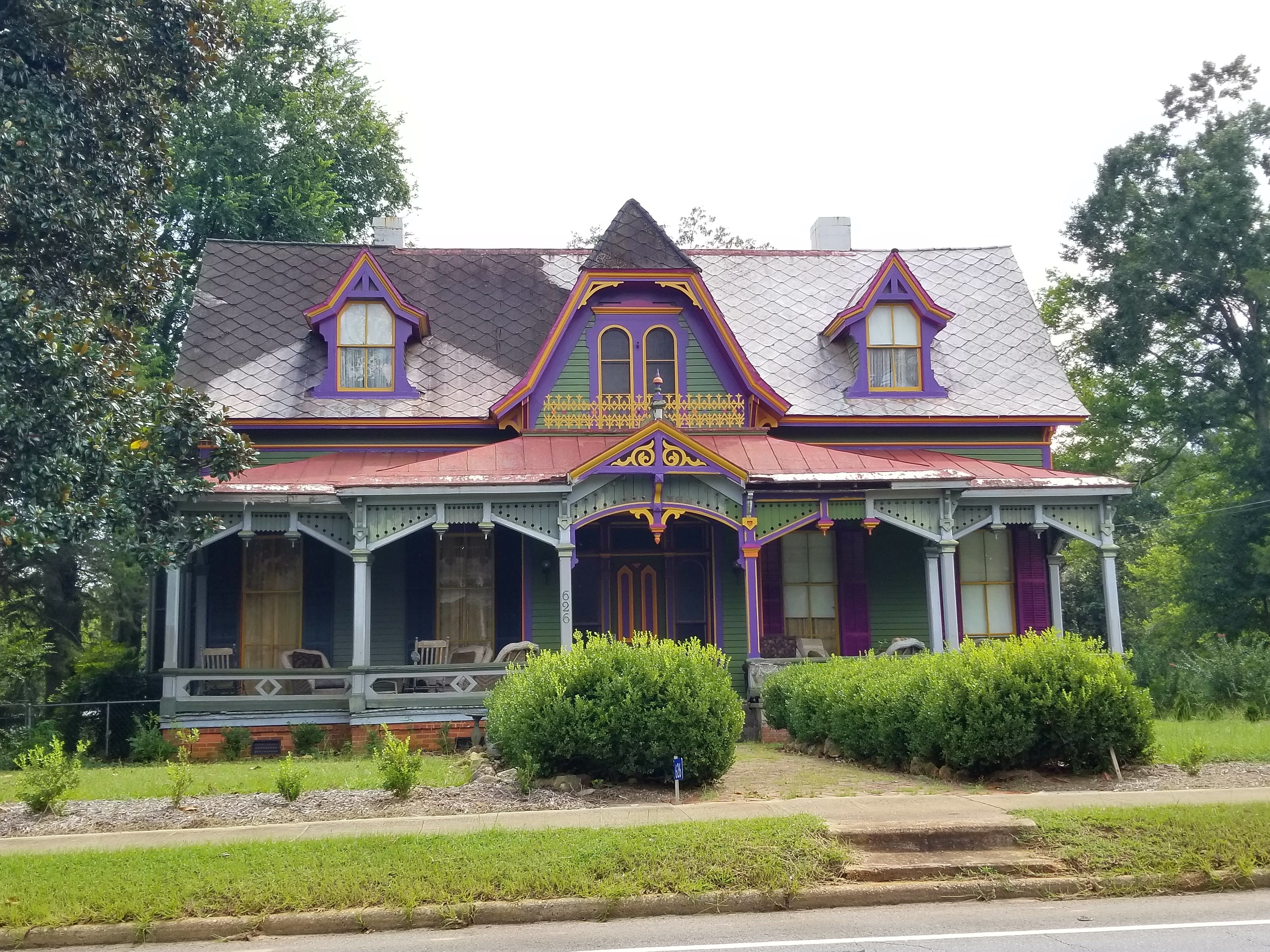
Pulaskir-Barnes House - 2017
