= Donnell Harvey =

American basketball player (born 1980)

Personal information
- Born: August 26, 1980 (age 46) Shellman, Georgia, U.S.
- Listed height: 6 ft 8 in (2.03 m)
- Listed weight: 220 lb (100 kg)

Career information
- High school: Randolph-Clay (Cuthbert, Georgia)
- College: Florida (1999–2000)
- NBA draft: 2000: 1st round, 22nd overall pick
- Drafted by: New York Knicks
- Playing career: 2000–2014
- Position: Power forward / small forward
- Number: 1, 4, 44

Career history
- 2000–2002: Dallas Mavericks
- 2002–2003: Denver Nuggets
- 2003: Orlando Magic
- 2003–2004: Phoenix Suns
- 2004–2005: Sioux Falls Skyforce
- 2005: New Jersey Nets
- 2005–2006: Panionios
- 2006–2007: Beşiktaş
- 2007–2008: Banvit B.K.
- 2008–2009: Jiangsu Dragons
- 2009: Gigantes de Carolina
- 2010: Jiangsu Dragons
- 2010–2011: KK Igokea
- 2011–2012: Tianjin Ronggang
- 2012: Talk 'N Text Tropang Texters
- 2012–2013: Tianjin Ronggang
- 2013: Talk 'N Text Tropang Texters
- 2013–2014: Shandong Lions

Career highlights
- CBA rebounding leader (2013); CBA Slam Dunk leader (2009); Naismith Prep Player of the Year (1999); USA Today High School Player of the Year (1999); McDonald's All-American (1999); First-team Parade All-American (1999); Fourth-team Parade All-American (1998); Mr. Georgia Basketball (1999)
- Stats at NBA.com
- Stats at Basketball Reference

Donnell Eugene Harvey (born August 26, 1980) is an American retired professional basketball player. He played in the National Basketball Association (NBA) for the New Jersey Nets, Denver Nuggets, Dallas Mavericks, Orlando Magic, and Phoenix Suns. His daughter Aniya Harvey appeared on the eighth season of Love Island USA.

== High school career ==
Harvey was born in Shellman, Georgia. He attended Randolph-Clay High School in Cuthbert, Georgia where he was the consensus 1999 national high school player of the year. In 1999, he was in the McDonald's All-America Game, was in the USA Today All-USA 1st Team in 1999, and got the Naismith Award as nation's top high school player in 1999.

== College career ==
Harvey accepted an athletic scholarship to attend the University of Florida in Gainesville, Florida, where he played for coach Billy Donovan's Florida Gators men's basketball team during the 1999–2000 season. After starting three-fourths of the Gators' first 12 games, he lost his starting spot to Brent Wright after returning home over the New Year's break because of homesickness. Harvey averaged 10.2 points, 7.0 rebounds and 1.0 assists per game and was voted to the SEC All-Freshman Team in his only season playing college basketball.

== Professional career ==
Harvey was selected by the New York Knicks with the 22nd overall pick of the 2000 NBA draft and then traded, along with John Wallace, to the Mavericks in exchange for Erick Strickland and Pete Mickeal. He was in Dallas until he was traded to the Denver Nuggets in February 2002. Harvey then latched on to the Orlando Magic in September 2003, only to be traded to the Phoenix Suns in December 2003. He was signed then waived by the Atlanta Hawks in October 2004. Harvey joined the Sioux Falls Skyforce of the Continental Basketball Association (CBA) in December 2004. He was called up to the New Jersey Nets in February 2005 but was waived 2 weeks later after only playing 3 games for team.

Harvey's final NBA game ever was played on February 13, 2005, in a 94–79 win over the Denver Nuggets. Harvey played for 2 minutes and the only stat he recorded was 1 rebound.

Harvey then played for Panionios (Greece) from September 2005 until March 2006. He then went to Beşiktaş (Turkey) in 2006–07, then later went to Rieti (Italy) in July 2007.

Harvey has also played for Banvitspor in Turkey and the Carolina Giants in Puerto Rico (2009). In November 2010, Harvey signed with the Bosnian club KK Igokea.

After playing for Jiangsu in the Chinese Basketball Association for the 2008–09 and 2009–10 seasons, Harvey played 32 games with Tianjin Ronggang for the 2011–12 season, averaging 24.7 points and 14.7 rebounds per game.

He joined the Talk 'N Text Tropang Texters replacing the injured Omar Samhan for the 2012 PBA Commissioner's Cup. He led the Texters to the finals, but the team ultimately lost to the B-Meg Llamados 4–3. During Game 7 of the Finals, he fouled out late in the 4th quarter despite having a superb performance. Later that year, he returned to Tianjin Ronggang. In 2013, he rejoined the Talk 'N Text Tropang Texters. However, he left the team midseason to be with his children in the United States as they recovered from a car accident.
