= Shellman Historic District =

Historic district in Georgia, United States

- U.S. National Register of Historic Places
- U.S. Historic district
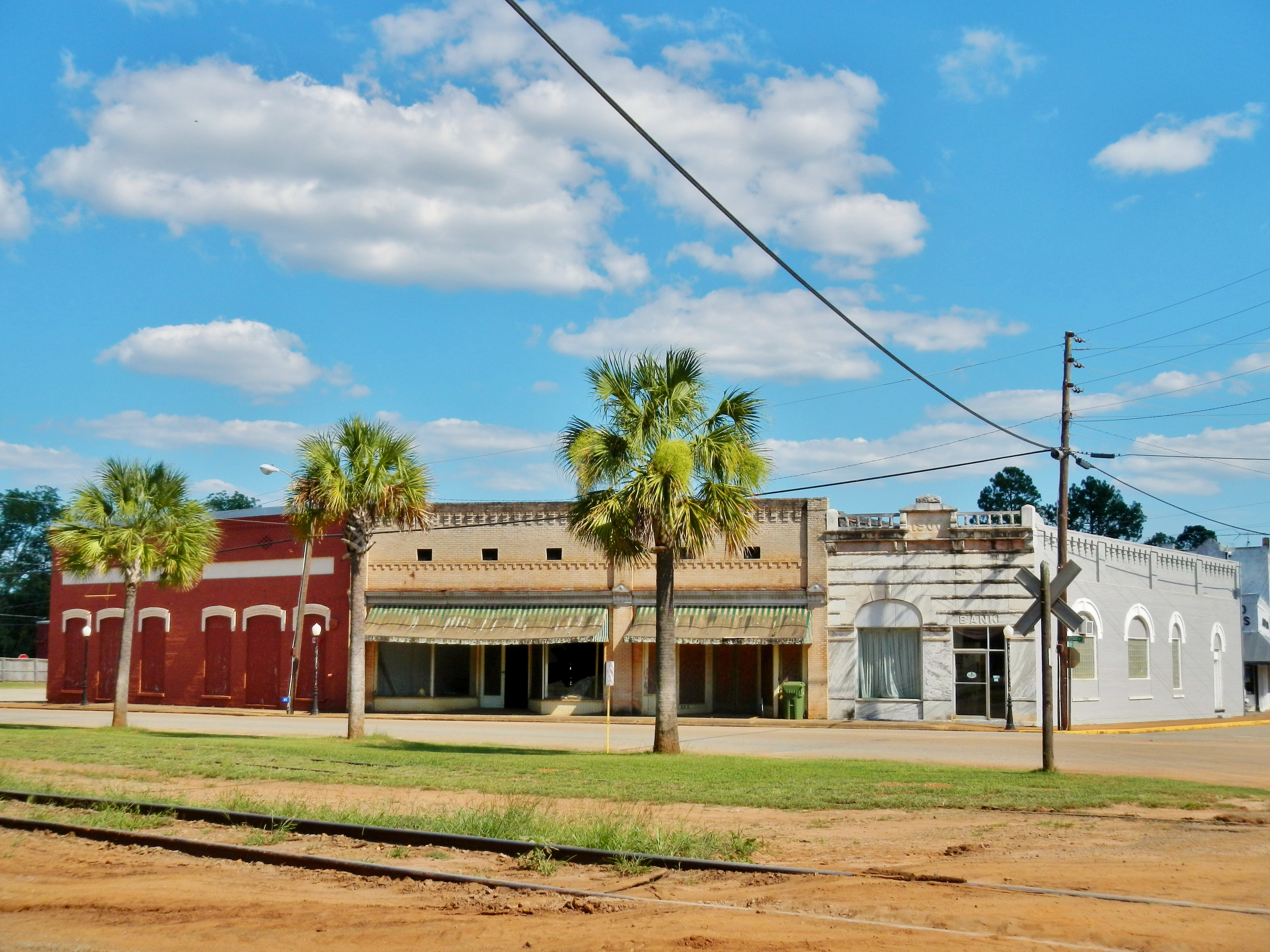

- Location within Georgia Location within the United States
- Location: Roughly bounded by Dean, Church, Mary Lou, Ward, Pecan and Pine Sts., Shellman, Georgia
- Coordinates: 31.758611°N 84.614167°W
- Area: 200 acres (0.81 km^{2})
- Built by: Multiple
- Architectural style: Classical Revival, Bungalow/craftsman, Late Victorian
- NRHP reference No.: 85001935
- Added to NRHP: August 29, 1985

The Shellman Historic District is a 200 acres (0.81 km^{2}) historic district in Shellman in Randolph County, Georgia which was listed on the National Register of Historic Places in 1985. It included 163 contributing buildings and a contributing site.

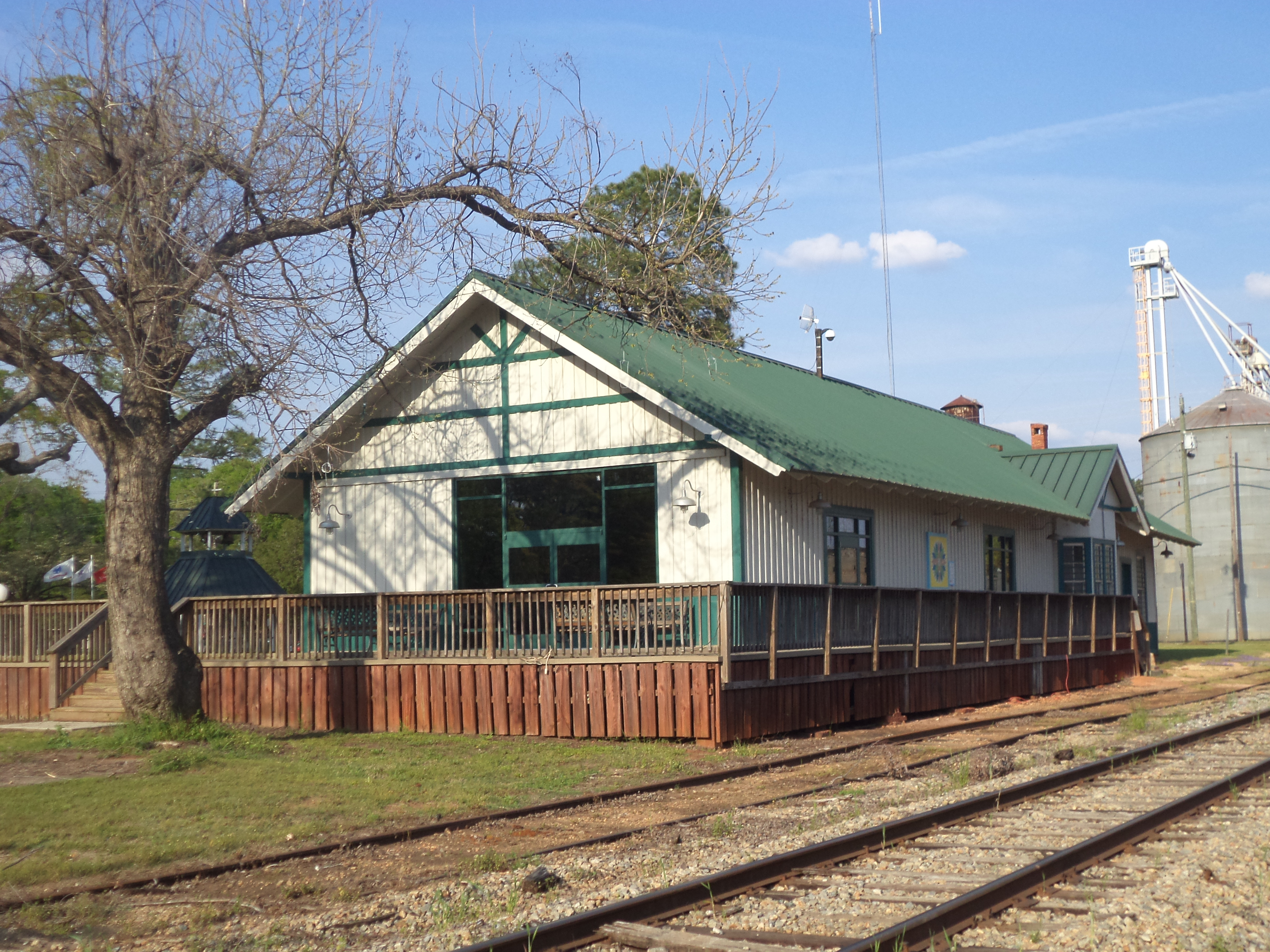
Shellman Railroad Depot

Per its NRHP nomination, "The Shellman Historic District includes Shellman's intact historic, residential, and commercial resources, several historic churches, a railroad depot, and the city cemetery." It was deemed "historically significant in terms of community planning and development, transportation, architecture, landscape architecture, commerce, and local history."
