= Willa Holt Wakefield =

American entertainer

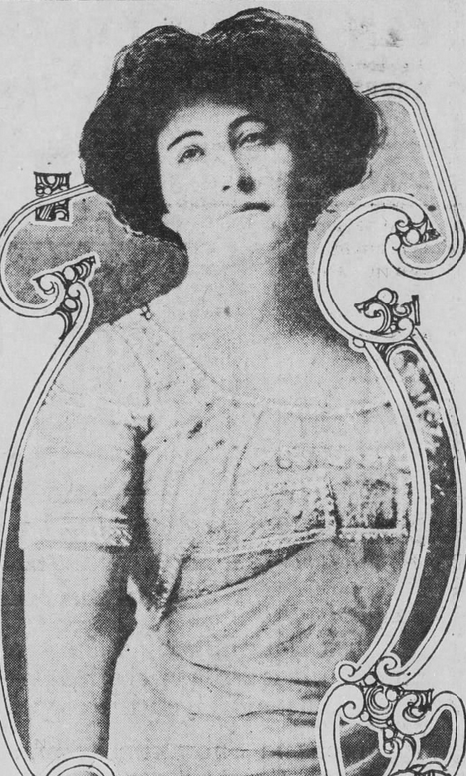
- Willa Holt Wakefield, from a 1912 newspaper
- Born: Willa Holt; November 9, 1870; Cuthbert, Georgia, U.S.
- Died: June 3, 1946 (aged 75); Los Angeles, California, U.S.
- Occupation(s): Storyteller, singer, pianist, vaudeville performer

Willa Holt Wakefield (November 9, 1870 – June 3, 1946) was an American vaudeville performer. Wakefield told stories and recited in the "pianologue" style, and was billed as "the Lady of Optimism".

== Early life and education ==
Willa Holt was born in Cuthbert, Georgia, the daughter of Peyton Robert Holt and Harriet (Hattie) Missouri Platt Holt. Her father was a pharmacist and a Confederate States Army veteran of the American Civil War. She studied piano with Theodor Leschetizky.

== Career ==
Wakefield taught school as a young woman. She was a pianologue on the vaudeville stage in the 1910s and 1920s. Her act featured sentimental, patriotic, humorous and nostalgic stories, recitations, and songs, presented with "elegance, refinement, self-control, and dignity". "She is quite the pleasantest entertainer one could wish for," noted a Detroit critic in 1909. In a 1917 interview, she explained her choice of material, saying "We very often move in a veritable mental mist in this sad old grumbling world, a thick mist of prejudice and irritability and hyper sensitiveness--and so we become more and more hypercritical ourselves. Yet, after all, it is a mist that can be easily dispelled by thrilling beams of mental sunshine." Holt was promoted as a rival to the equally popular but more risqué entertainer Eva Tanguay. She performed in England in 1913.

Wakefield had a reputation for making shrewd investments, and owned a farm on Long Island as well as a home on New York's Riverside Drive. She also performed on radio programs.

== Personal life ==
Wakefield married Vienna-born sculptor Arnold Frederick Foerster in 1915; they divorced in 1936. She died in 1946, in Los Angeles, at the age of 75.
