= Jerry Braswell Jr. =

American basketball player

Jerry Lamar Braswell Jr (born September 7, 1975) is the son of Jerry Lamar Braswell Sr and Gloria Jean Braswell. He was a European professional basketball player in Germany from 1998 to 1999.

== Education and career ==
Braswell was born in Cuthbert, Georgia. He attended Randolph-Clay High School in Cuthbert, where he was the first freshman player to ever start for Coach Joe Williams. Braswell was the team's MVP for four years and the consensus 1994 Georgia high school player of the year and rated as one of the Nations top 25 players. In 1994, Braswell was in the KFC All-America Game, turning down the McDonald's All-American game to be with a group of his AAU peers. Braswell named to the USA Today All-USA Team in 1994.

Braswell accepted an athletic scholarship to attend Wake Forest University in 1994, where he played for Coach Dave Odom's Wake-Forest Demon Deacons men's basketball team during the 1994–1998 season as a four-year starter. He sat out the first five games of his second year due to being academically ineligible by the school's standards, although he was eligible by NCAA standards.

Braswell played along with NBA star Tim Duncan and helped Wake-Forest to win two ACC titles, three appearances in the NCAA March Madness, an Elite 8 Appearance in 1996, and Team Ranked #2 Nationally for 19 straight weeks during 1996–97 season. Braswell graduated from college with a communications degree.

After Wake-Forest, Braswell played professionally in Europe in 1998–1999 for SV 03 Tübingen in Germany, where he played in 27 games and averaged 20.0 points per game, and led his team to the playoffs for the first time. He suffered a career-ending ankle injury. He later served as Assistant Coach at Ramapo College in Mahwah, New Jersey.
