= Benevolence, Georgia =

Unincorporated community in Georgia, U.S.

Coordinates: 31°52′55″N 84°44′05″W

Benevolence is an unincorporated community in Randolph County, in the U.S. state of Georgia.

== History ==
The first settlement at Benevolence was made in 1831. Benevolence was so named for the "benevolent" act of a first settler who donated land at the town site so that a Baptist church could be built. A post office called Benevolence was established in 1854, and remained in operation until 1984.

By 1900, the community had 61 inhabitants. The Georgia General Assembly incorporated Benevolence as a town in 1911. The town was officially dissolved in 1995, as the last inhabitant moved away two years prior.
