= Coleman, Georgia =

- Unincorporated community Census-designated place
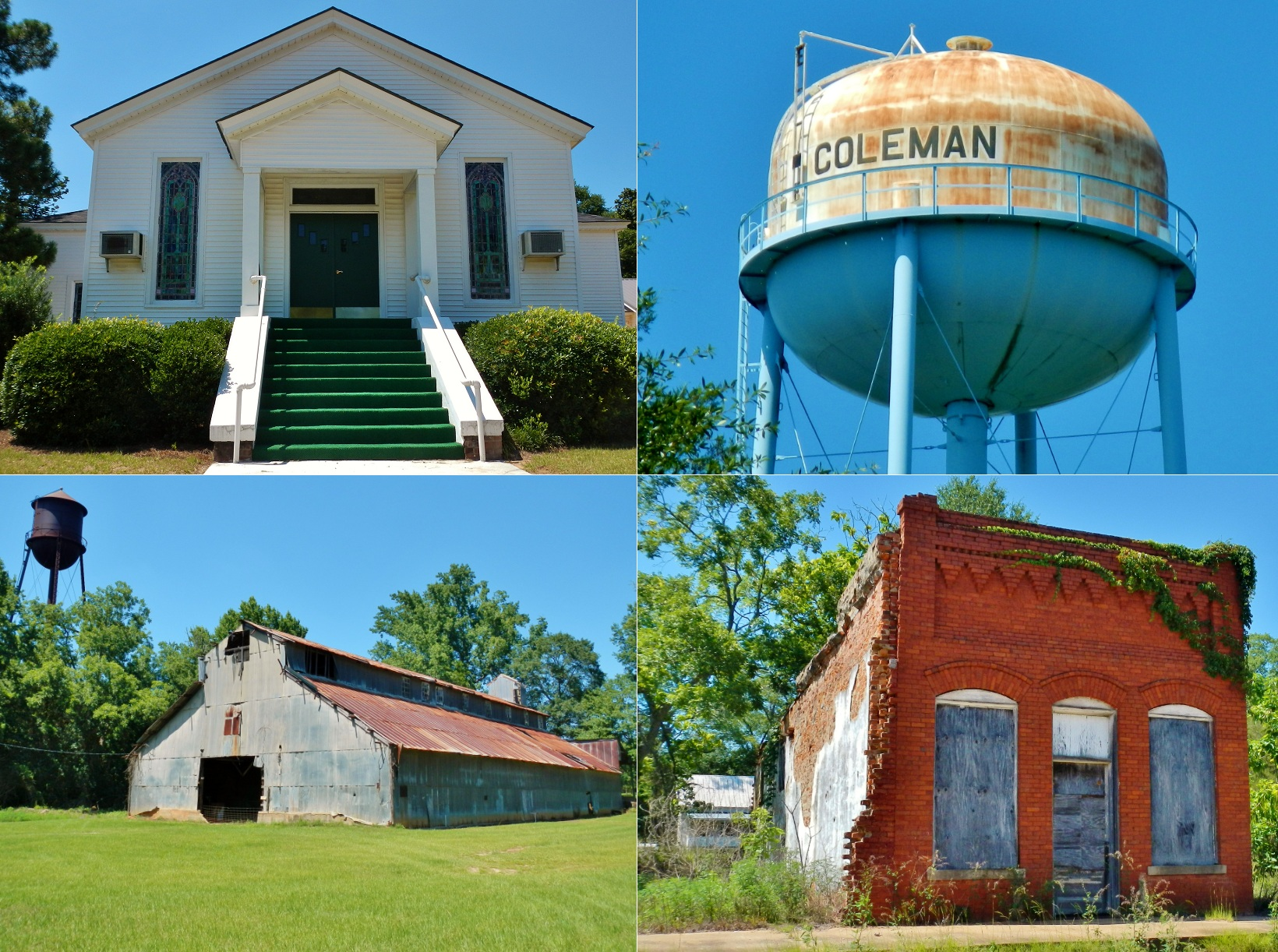
- Coleman in 2012.

- Location in Randolph County and the state of Georgia
- Coordinates: 31°40′22″N 84°53′25″W
- Country: United States
- State: Georgia
- County: Randolph

Area
  - Total: 0.62 sq mi (1.60 km^{2})
  - Land: 0.61 sq mi (1.59 km^{2})
  - Water: 0.0077 sq mi (0.02 km^{2})
- Elevation: 400 ft (122 m)

Population (2020)
  - Total: 116
  - Density: 189.5/sq mi (73.16/km^{2})
- Time zone: UTC-5 (Eastern (EST))
  - Summer (DST): UTC-4 (EDT)
- ZIP codes: 31736, 39836
- Area code: 229
- FIPS code: 13-17580
- GNIS feature ID: 0312820

Coleman is a former incorporated city in Randolph County, Georgia, United States. It is listed as a census-designated place (CDP). As of the 2020 census, Coleman had a population of 116. The city was abolished by House Bill 1102 effective January 1, 2007, and no longer exists as a municipality.

== History ==
The community was named after Andy Coleman, the original owner of the town site. The Georgia General Assembly incorporated the place in 1889 as the "Town of Coleman" with municipal corporate limits extending in a one-half mile radius from the South Western Railroad depot.

== Geography ==
Coleman is located at 31°40′22″N 84°53′25″W (31.672794, -84.890269).

According to the United States Census Bureau, the city has a total area of 0.8 square miles (2.1 km^{2}), of which 0.8 square miles (2.1 km^{2}) is land and 1.30% is water.

== Demographics ==
Historical population
Census	Pop.	Note	%±
1890	211		—
1900	263		24.6%
1910	354		34.6%
1920	342		−3.4%
1930	400		17.0%
1940	270		−32.5%
1950	295		9.3%
1960	220		−25.4%
1970	168		−23.6%
1980	164		−2.4%
1990	137		−16.5%
2000	149		8.8%
2010	127		−14.8%
2020	116		−8.7%
U.S. Decennial Census; 1850-1870 1870-1880; 1890-1910 1920-1930; 1940 1950 1960; 1970 1980 1990; 2000 2010 2020

Coleman was listed as a town in the 2000 U.S. census. After the town was dissolved in 2007, it was redesignated as a census designated place in the 2010 U.S. census.

=== Racial and ethnic composition ===
Coleman, Georgia – Racial and ethnic composition Note: the US Census treats Hispanic/Latino as an ethnic category. This table excludes Latinos from the racial categories and assigns them to a separate category. Hispanics/Latinos may be of any race.
Race / Ethnicity (NH = Non-Hispanic)	Pop 2000	Pop 2010	Pop 2020	% 2000	% 2010	% 2020
White alone (NH)	57	41	33	38.26%	32.28%	28.45%
Black or African American alone (NH)	92	83	74	61.74%	65.35%	63.79%
Native American or Alaska Native alone (NH)	0	0	0	0.00%	0.00%	0.00%
Asian alone (NH)	0	0	1	0.00%	0.00%	0.86%
Native Hawaiian or Pacific Islander alone (NH)	0	0	0	0.00%	0.00%	0.00%
Other race alone (NH)	0	0	0	0.00%	0.00%	0.00%
Mixed race or Multiracial (NH)	0	0	6	0.00%	0.00%	5.17%
Hispanic or Latino (any race)	0	3	2	0.00%	2.36%	1.72%
Total	149	127	116	100.00%	100.00%	100.00%

As of the census of 2000, there were 149 people, 66 households, and 34 families residing in the city; by the 2010 census, its population declined to 127, and then in 2020 to 116.

== Gallery ==
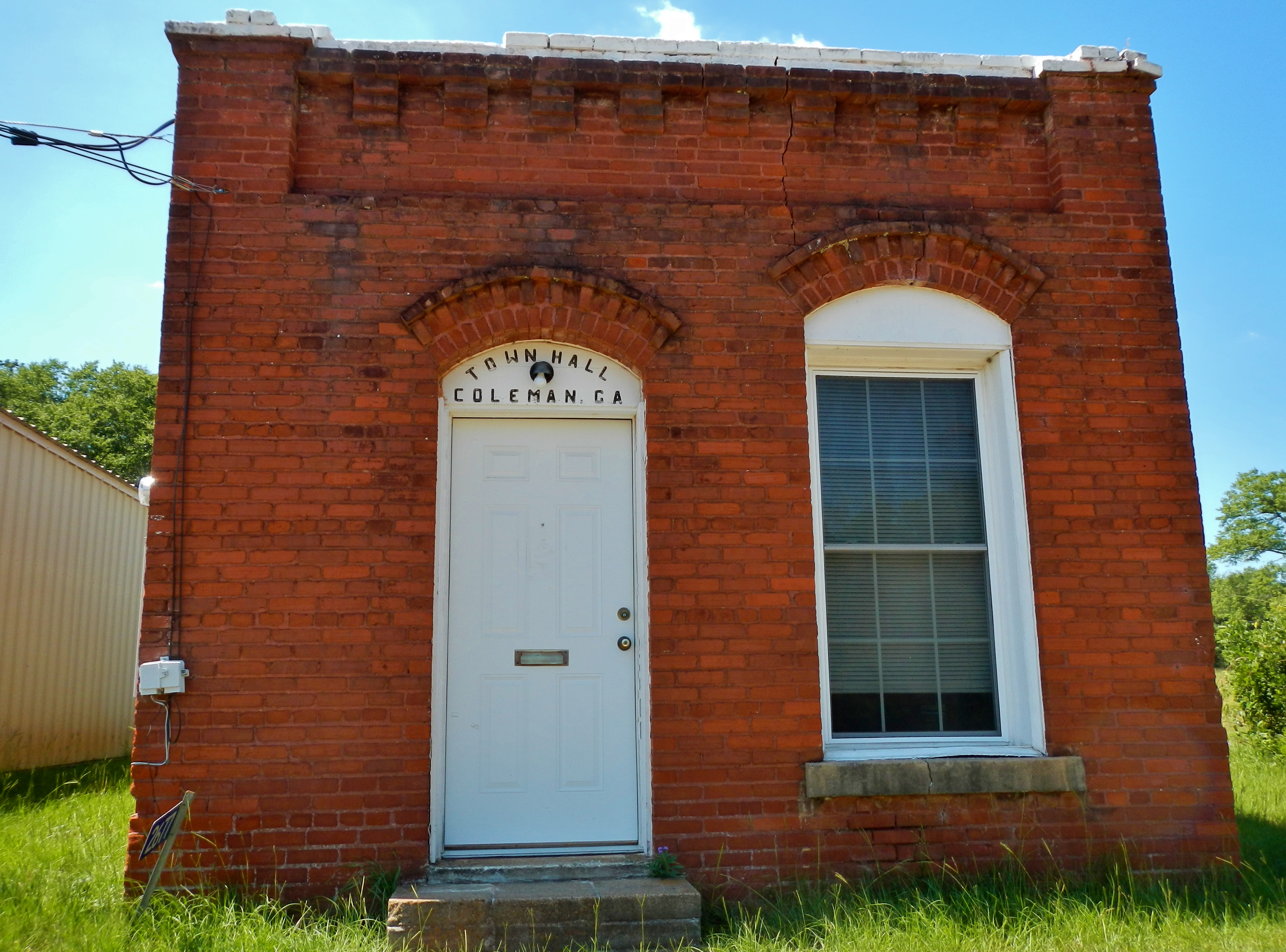
Coleman Town Hall

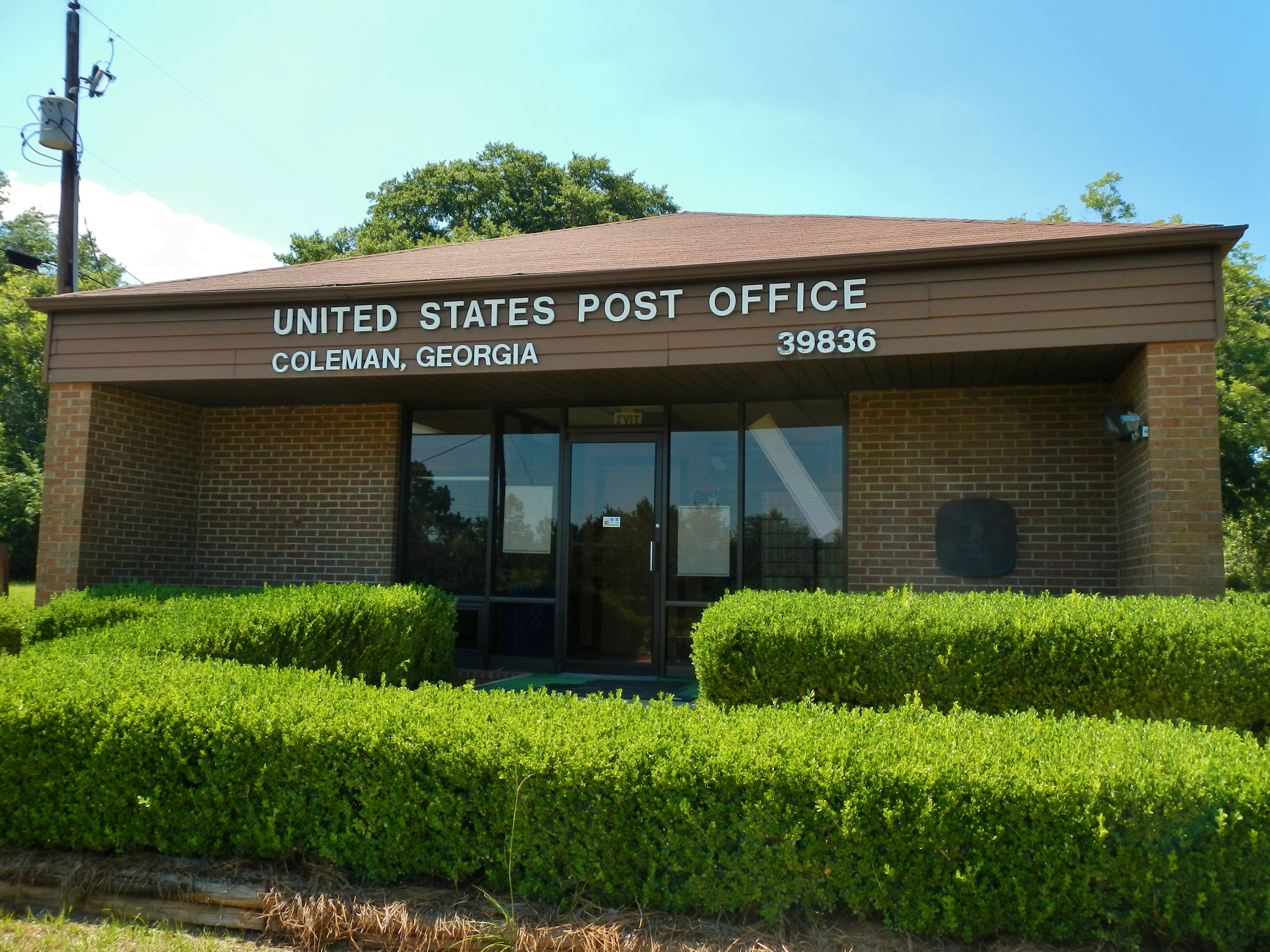
Coleman Post Office (ZIP code: 39836)

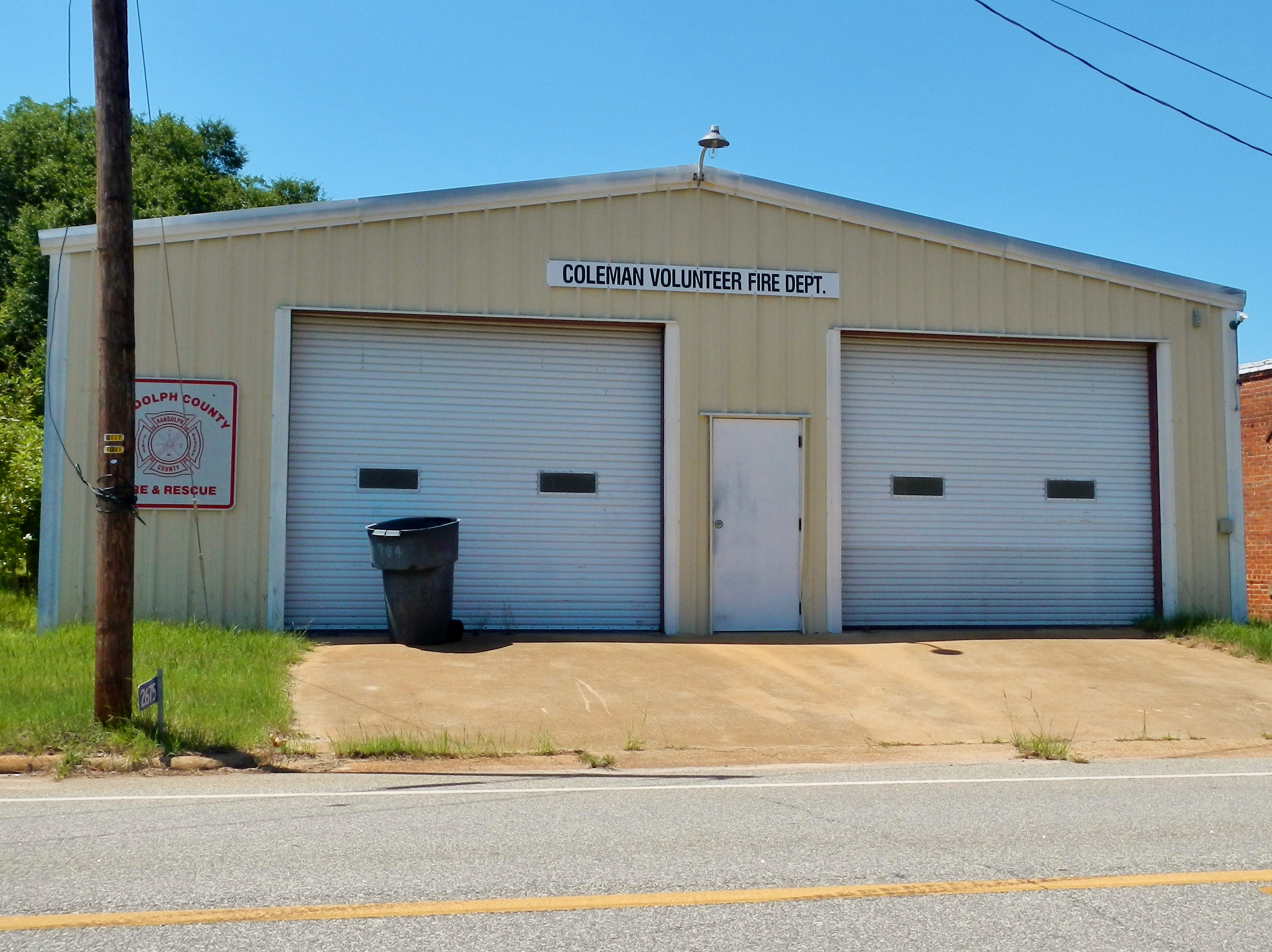
Coleman Volunteer Fire Department
