= Shellman, Georgia =

- City
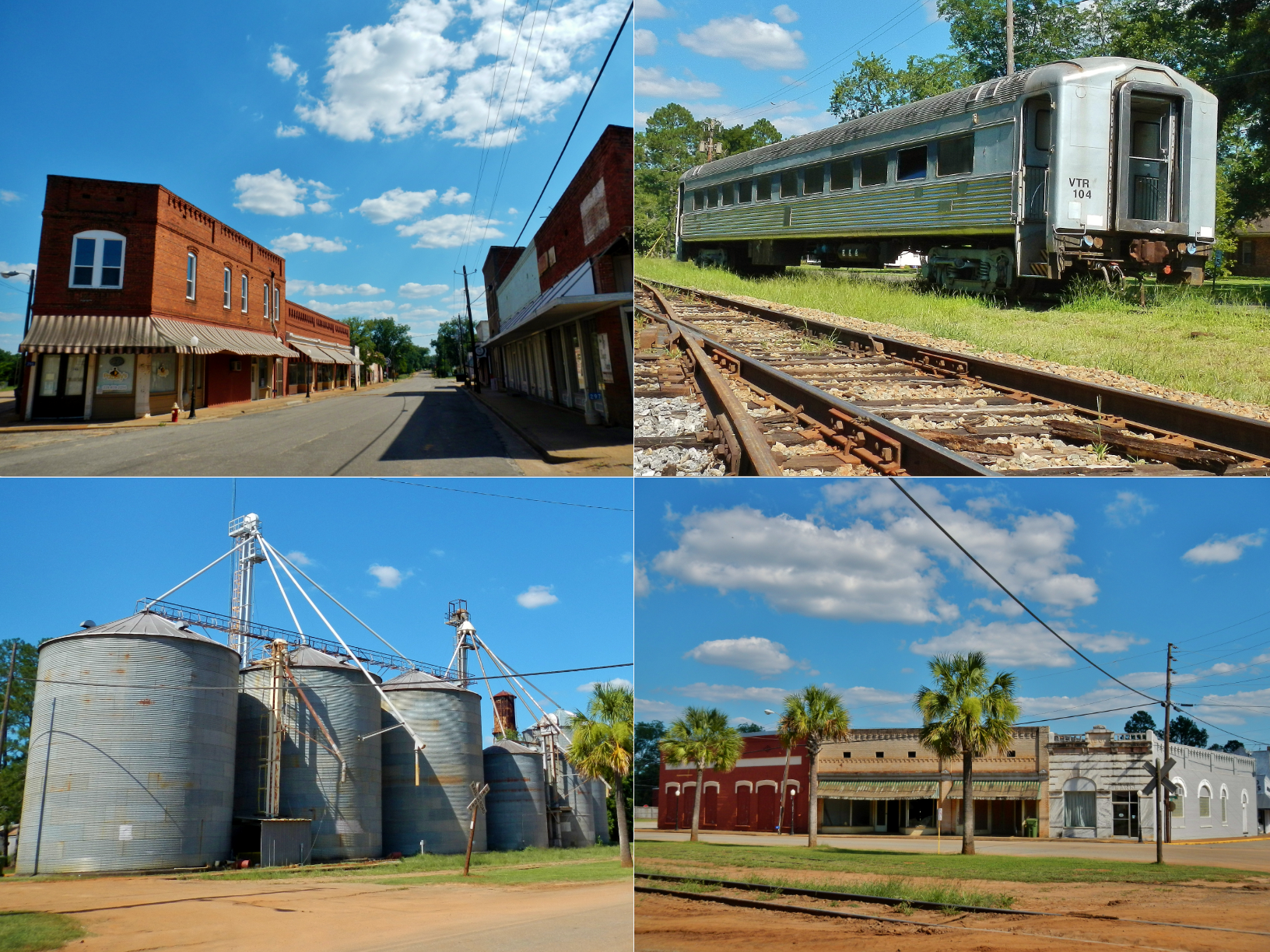
- Shellman in 2012.

- Location in Randolph County and the state of Georgia
- Coordinates: 31°45′31″N 84°36′46″W
- Country: United States
- State: Georgia
- County: Randolph

Area
  - Total: 3.15 sq mi (8.16 km^{2})
  - Land: 3.15 sq mi (8.16 km^{2})
  - Water: 0 sq mi (0.00 km^{2})
- Elevation: 384 ft (117 m)

Population (2020)
  - Total: 861
  - Density: 273.4/sq mi (105.56/km^{2})
- Time zone: UTC-5 (Eastern (EST))
  - Summer (DST): UTC-4 (EDT)
- ZIP codes: 39886
- Area code: 229
- FIPS code: 13-70120
- GNIS feature ID: 0356533
- Website: https://cityofshellman.com/

Shellman is a city in Randolph County, Georgia, United States. As of the 2020 census, Shellman had a population of 861. Buildings in the commercial center have been designated as an historic district and listed in 1985 on the National Register of Historic Places.

== Geography ==
Shellman is located at 31°45′31″N 84°36′46″W (31.758473, -84.612731).

According to the United States Census Bureau, the city has a total area of 3.2 square miles (8.3 km^{2}), all land.

== History ==
Shellman was incorporated in 1883. It was originally named Ward, in honor of John P. Ward, whose vision helped to bring the South-Western Rail Road to the area and to place a depot in the spot that would become the center of the town.

Only two years later, the name of the town was changed to Shellman, in honor of Major R. F. Shellman, general traffic manager of the Central of Georgia Railroad. Major Shellman was a promoter of the young town and a donor to the construction of its new school, the Shellman Institute.

The Shellman Historic District is listed on the National Register of Historic Places.

The history of Shellman is extensively recorded in two documents published by the Randolph County Georgia Historical Society :

- A History of Shellman (1827-1883)
- Historic Buildings of Shellman (1830-1950)

== Demographics ==
Historical population
Census	Pop.	Note	%±
1890	462		—
1900	584		26.4%
1910	985		68.7%
1920	1,074		9.0%
1930	1,117		4.0%
1940	1,063		−4.8%
1950	1,090		2.5%
1960	1,050		−3.7%
1970	1,166		11.0%
1980	1,254		7.5%
1990	1,162		−7.3%
2000	1,166		0.3%
2010	1,083		−7.1%
2020	861		−20.5%
U.S. Decennial Census; 1850-1870 1870-1880; 1890-1910 1920-1930; 1940 1950 1960; 1970 1980 1990; 2000 2010

Shellman racial composition as of 2020
Race	Num.	Perc.
White (non-Hispanic)	292	33.91%
Black or African American (non-Hispanic)	545	63.3%
Native American	1	0.12%
Other/Mixed	15	1.74%
Hispanic or Latino	8	0.93%

As of the 2020 United States census, there were 861 people, 374 households, and 213 families residing in the city.

== Notable people ==
- Thomas Davis, NFL linebacker, grew up in Shellman.
- Donnell Harvey, former NBA athlete, grew up here.
- Diadourius Boudleaux Bryant, part of the prolific songwriting team of Felice and Boudleaux Bryant, was born in Shellman in 1920.
- Paul C. Broun Sr., Georgia State Senator was born here in 1916

== Gallery ==
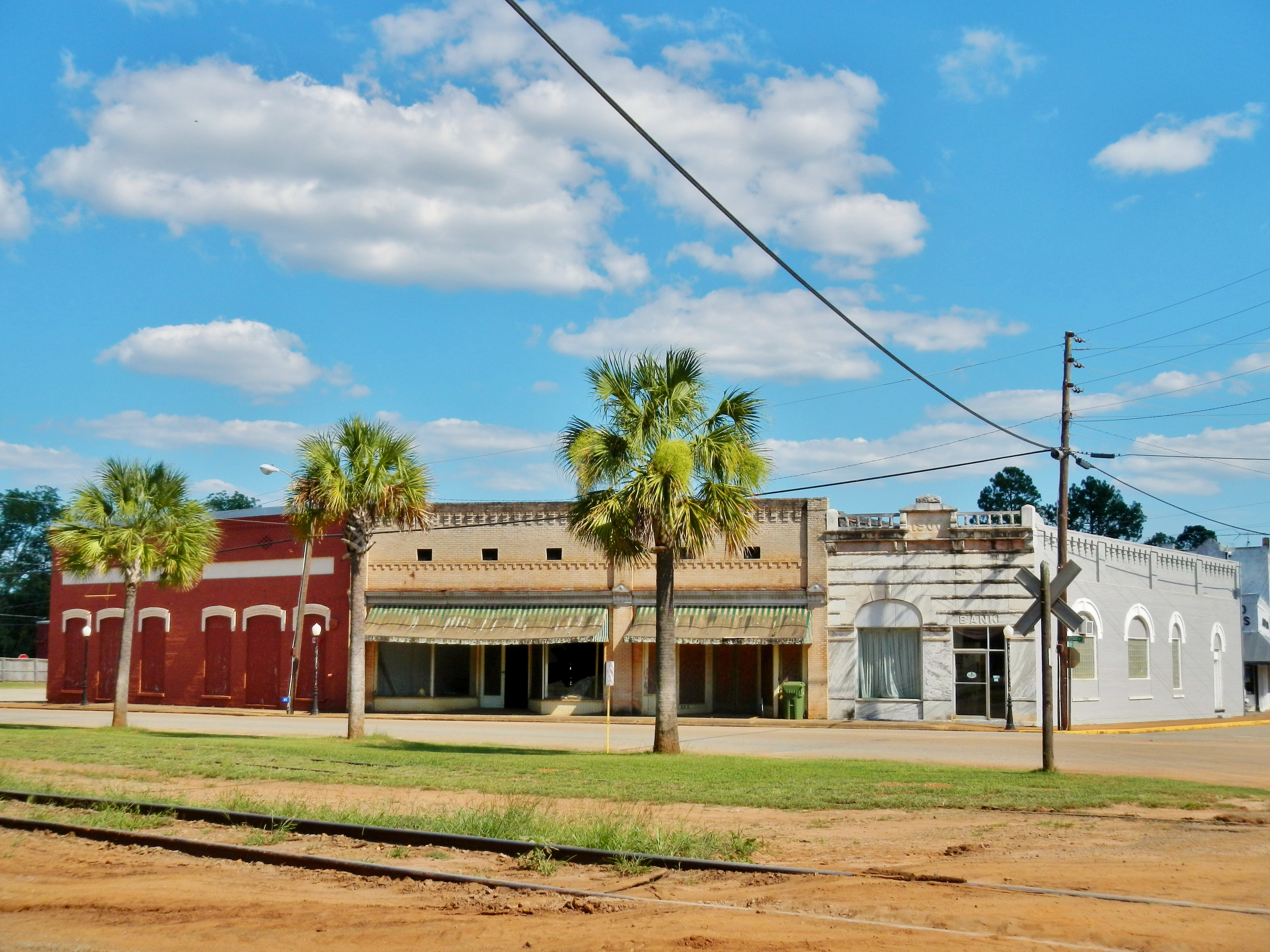
The Shellman Historic District was added to the National Register of Historic Places.

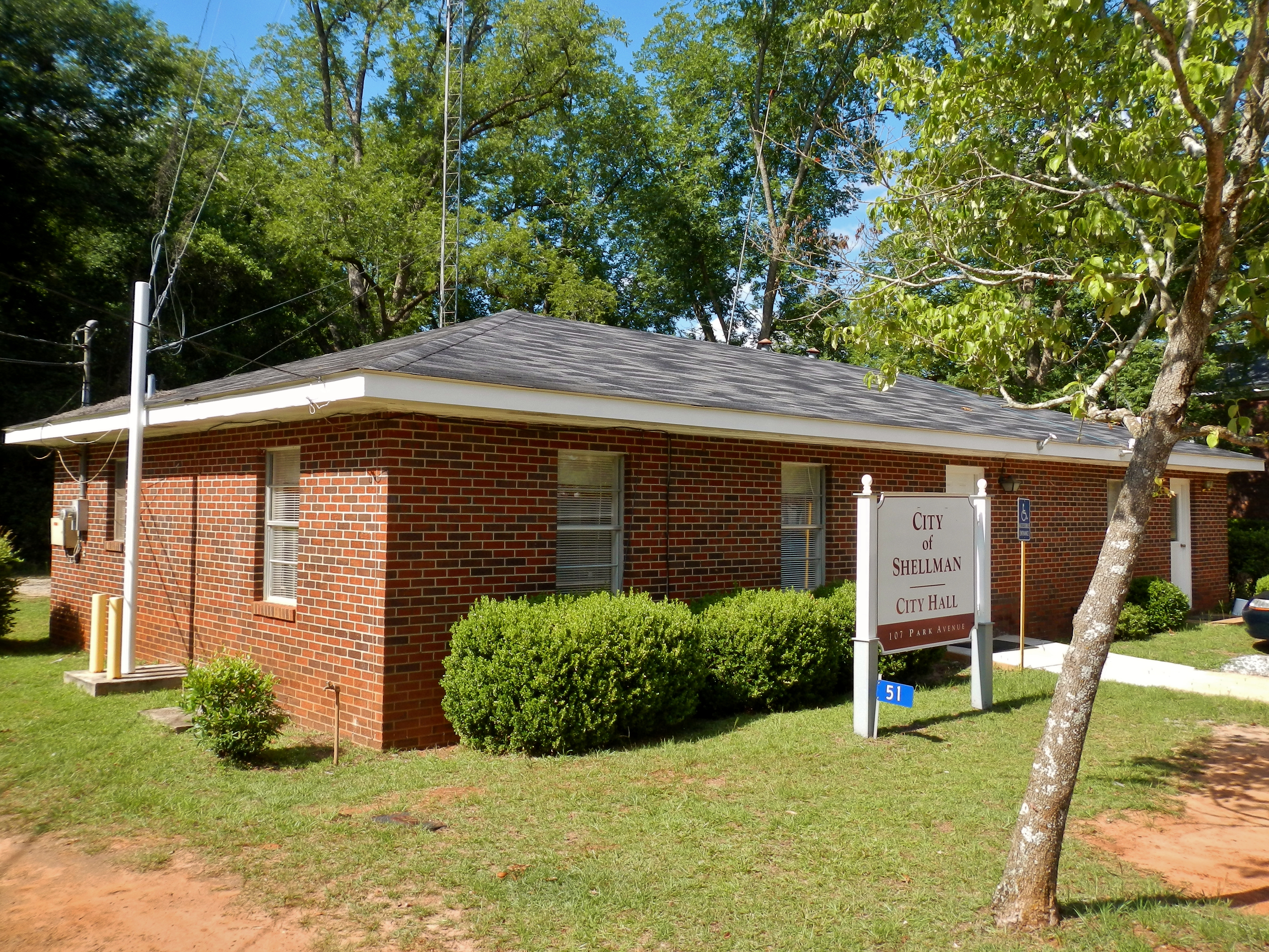
Shellman City Hall

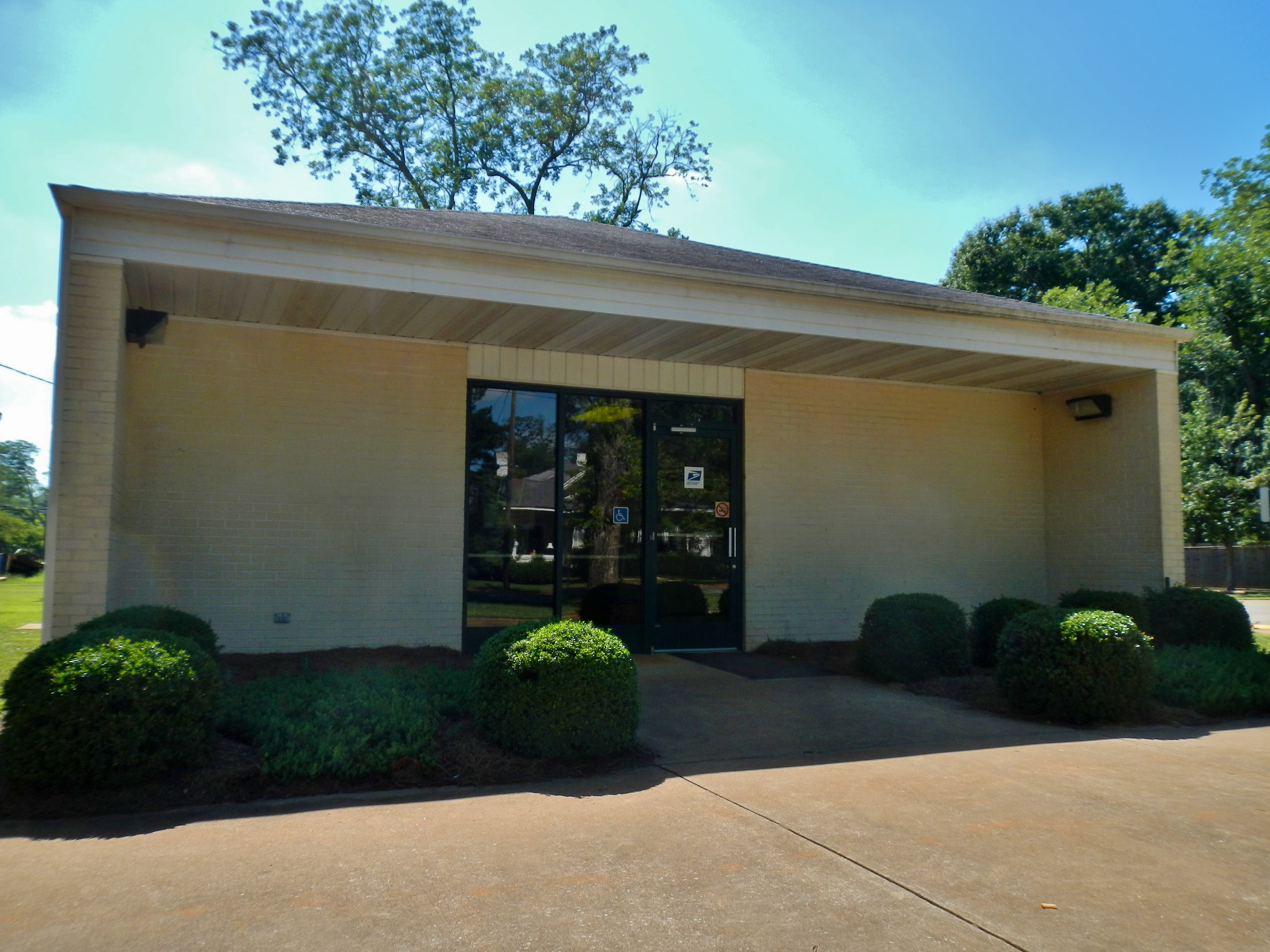
Shellman Post Office (ZIP code: 39886)

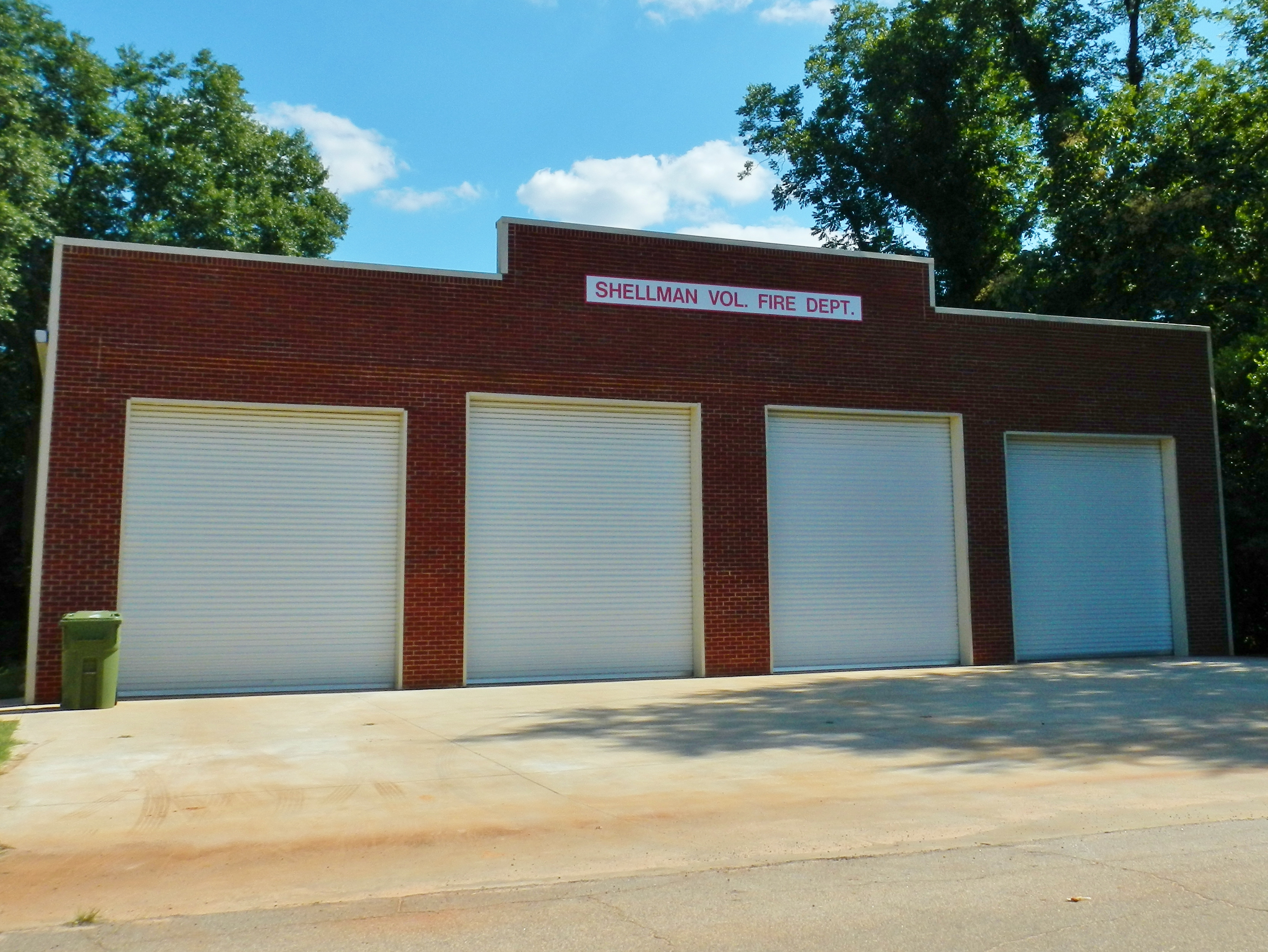
Shellman Volunteer Fire Department
