= Cuthbert, Georgia =

- City
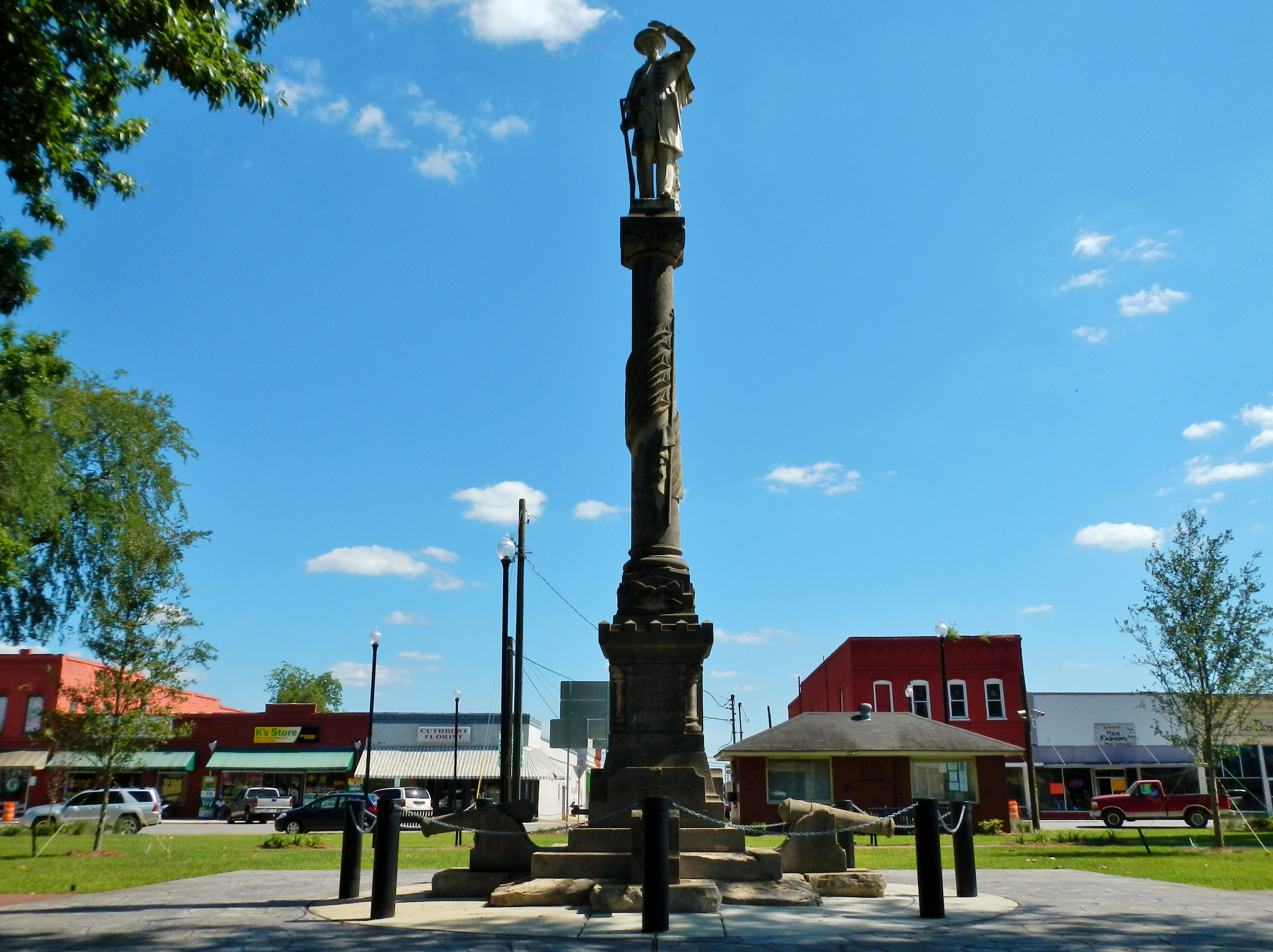
- Cuthbert in 2012

- Location in Randolph County and the state of Georgia
- Coordinates: 31°46′15″N 84°47′37″W
- Country: United States
- State: Georgia
- County: Randolph

Area
  - Total: 3.06 sq mi (7.92 km^{2})
  - Land: 3.05 sq mi (7.89 km^{2})
  - Water: 0.015 sq mi (0.04 km^{2})
- Elevation: 466 ft (142 m)

Population (2020)
  - Total: 3,143
  - Density: 1,032.0/sq mi (398.46/km^{2})
- Time zone: UTC-5 (Eastern (EST))
  - Summer (DST): UTC-4 (EDT)
- ZIP code: 39840
- Area code: 229
- FIPS code: 13-21072
- GNIS feature ID: 0313227
- Website: https://www.cuthbertga.org/

Cuthbert is a city in and the county seat of Randolph County, Georgia, United States. As of the 2020 census, Cuthbert had a population of 3,143.

== History ==
Cuthbert was founded by European Americans in 1831 as seat of the newly formed Randolph County, after Indian Removal of the historic tribes to Indian Territory west of the Mississippi River. John Alfred Cuthbert, who represented Georgia in the U.S. House of Representatives from 1819 to 1821, is its namesake. The county was developed for cotton plantations, the major commodity crop, and the rural area had a high proportion of enslaved African-American workers. Cuthbert was incorporated as a town in 1834 and as a city in 1859, serving as the trading center for the area. The Central of Georgia Railway arrived in Cuthbert in the 1850s, stimulating trade and growth, and providing a means of getting cotton and other crops to market.

A few years before 2022, the city's hospital closed.

== Geography ==
Cuthbert is located at 31º46'15" North, 84º47'37" West (31.770726, -84.793517). The city is located along U.S. Route 27 and U.S. Route 82. U.S. Route 27 passes east of the city leading north 57 miles (92 km) to Columbus and south 112 miles (180 km) to Tallahassee, Florida. U.S. Route 82 passes through the heart of the city leading east 45 miles (72 km) to Albany and west 26 miles (42 km) to Eufaula, Alabama. Other highways that pass through the city include Georgia State Route 266 and Georgia State Route 216.

According to the United States Census Bureau, the city has a total area of 3.0 square miles (7.8 km^{2}), all land.

=== Climate ===
Climate data for Cuthbert, Georgia, 1991–2020 normals, extremes 1904–2019
Month	Jan	Feb	Mar	Apr	May	Jun	Jul	Aug	Sep	Oct	Nov	Dec	Year
Record high °F (°C)	84 (29)	87 (31)	93 (34)	95 (35)	100 (38)	105 (41)	105 (41)	104 (40)	103 (39)	100 (38)	91 (33)	82 (28)	105 (41)
Mean maximum °F (°C)	73.5 (23.1)	76.6 (24.8)	82.7 (28.2)	87.2 (30.7)	92.1 (33.4)	96.5 (35.8)	97.6 (36.4)	97.0 (36.1)	93.8 (34.3)	87.6 (30.9)	80.8 (27.1)	75.5 (24.2)	99.2 (37.3)
Mean daily maximum °F (°C)	60.1 (15.6)	64.0 (17.8)	70.8 (21.6)	77.8 (25.4)	85.0 (29.4)	89.8 (32.1)	91.5 (33.1)	90.8 (32.7)	87.3 (30.7)	78.8 (26.0)	69.3 (20.7)	61.6 (16.4)	77.2 (25.1)
Daily mean °F (°C)	47.5 (8.6)	50.4 (10.2)	56.9 (13.8)	63.9 (17.7)	71.9 (22.2)	78.3 (25.7)	80.6 (27.0)	80.0 (26.7)	75.9 (24.4)	66.1 (18.9)	55.9 (13.3)	49.4 (9.7)	64.7 (18.2)
Mean daily minimum °F (°C)	34.9 (1.6)	36.8 (2.7)	43.0 (6.1)	50.0 (10.0)	58.8 (14.9)	66.8 (19.3)	69.8 (21.0)	69.2 (20.7)	64.5 (18.1)	53.5 (11.9)	42.6 (5.9)	37.3 (2.9)	52.3 (11.3)
Mean minimum °F (°C)	19.5 (−6.9)	23.0 (−5.0)	28.7 (−1.8)	36.8 (2.7)	48.9 (9.4)	59.0 (15.0)	65.1 (18.4)	62.8 (17.1)	53.1 (11.7)	38.5 (3.6)	29.9 (−1.2)	22.2 (−5.4)	16.1 (−8.8)
Record low °F (°C)	−2 (−19)	9 (−13)	15 (−9)	29 (−2)	41 (5)	49 (9)	57 (14)	53 (12)	41 (5)	25 (−4)	13 (−11)	5 (−15)	−2 (−19)
Average precipitation inches (mm)	4.94 (125)	5.50 (140)	4.82 (122)	4.92 (125)	2.30 (58)	5.18 (132)	7.30 (185)	5.33 (135)	3.97 (101)	2.32 (59)	3.60 (91)	5.51 (140)	55.69 (1,413)
Average snowfall inches (cm)	0.0 (0.0)	0.2 (0.51)	0.1 (0.25)	0.0 (0.0)	0.0 (0.0)	0.0 (0.0)	0.0 (0.0)	0.0 (0.0)	0.0 (0.0)	0.0 (0.0)	0.0 (0.0)	0.0 (0.0)	0.3 (0.76)
Average precipitation days (≥ 0.01 in)	8.8	7.6	7.8	6.8	6.0	9.4	11.3	10.2	6.6	5.4	6.2	8.2	94.3
Average snowy days (≥ 0.1 in)	0.0	0.0	0.1	0.0	0.0	0.0	0.0	0.0	0.0	0.0	0.0	0.0	0.1
Source 1: NOAA
Source 2: XMACIS2 (mean maxima/minima 1981–2010)

== Demographics ==
Historical population
Census	Pop.	Note	%±
1870	2,210		—
1880	2,129		−3.7%
1890	2,328		9.3%
1900	2,641		13.4%
1910	3,210		21.5%
1920	3,022		−5.9%
1930	3,235		7.0%
1940	3,447		6.6%
1950	4,025		16.8%
1960	4,300		6.8%
1970	3,972		−7.6%
1980	4,340		9.3%
1990	3,730		−14.1%
2000	3,731		0.0%
2010	3,873		3.8%
2020	3,143		−18.8%
U.S. Decennial Census; 1850-1870 1870-1880; 1890-1910 1920-1930; 1940 1950 1960; 1970 1980 1990; 2000 2010

=== 2020 census ===
As of the 2020 census, there were 3,143 people, 1,194 households, and 839 families residing in the city.

The median age was 38.4 years. About 25.0% of residents were under the age of 18, and 19.1% were 65 years of age or older. For every 100 females, there were 80.9 males; for every 100 females age 18 and over, there were 73.9 males age 18 and over.

In 2020, 0.0% of residents lived in urban areas, while 100.0% lived in rural areas.

Of households, 29.9% had children under the age of 18 living in them. Of all households, 22.2% were married-couple households, 21.2% were households with a male householder and no spouse or partner present, and 51.8% were households with a female householder and no spouse or partner present. About 37.5% of all households were made up of individuals, and 17.3% had someone living alone who was 65 years of age or older.

There were 1,531 housing units, of which 16.7% were vacant. The homeowner vacancy rate was 0.5%, and the rental vacancy rate was 7.0%.

Cuthbert racial composition as of 2020
Race	Num.	Perc.
White (non-Hispanic)	485	15.43%
Black or African American (non-Hispanic)	2,527	80.4%
Native American	7	0.22%
Asian	16	0.51%
Pacific Islander	1	0.03%
Other/Mixed	46	1.46%
Hispanic or Latino	61	1.94%

== Culture and historic district ==
Cuthbert is home to Andrew College (formerly Andrew Female College), a two-year private liberal arts college. The Fletcher Henderson Museum is being established in Cuthbert in honor of the 20th-century jazz musician and orchestra arranger.

The city has notable sites such as a Confederate Army cemetery, historical houses built in the 1800s, and the Fletcher Henderson home. In 2007 an announcement was made of a museum to be dedicated to late resident Lena Baker and issues of racial justice. Baker was an African-American maid who was convicted of capital murder in 1945 in the death of a white man; she was the only woman in Georgia to be executed by electric chair. She had claimed self-defense, and in 2005 the state posthumously pardoned her. She was the subject of a 2001 biography and a 2008 feature film of the same name, The Lena Baker Story. (It was later retitled Hope and Redemption: The Lena Baker Story.)

== Education ==
The Randolph County School District holds grades pre-school to grade twelve, and consists of two elementary, middle, and high schools. The district has 88 full-time teachers and more than 1,530 students.

- Randolph County Elementary School
- Randolph Clay High School
- Albany Technical College

=== Higher education ===
- Andrew College - Main Campus
- Albany Technical College - Cuthbert campus

== Gallery ==
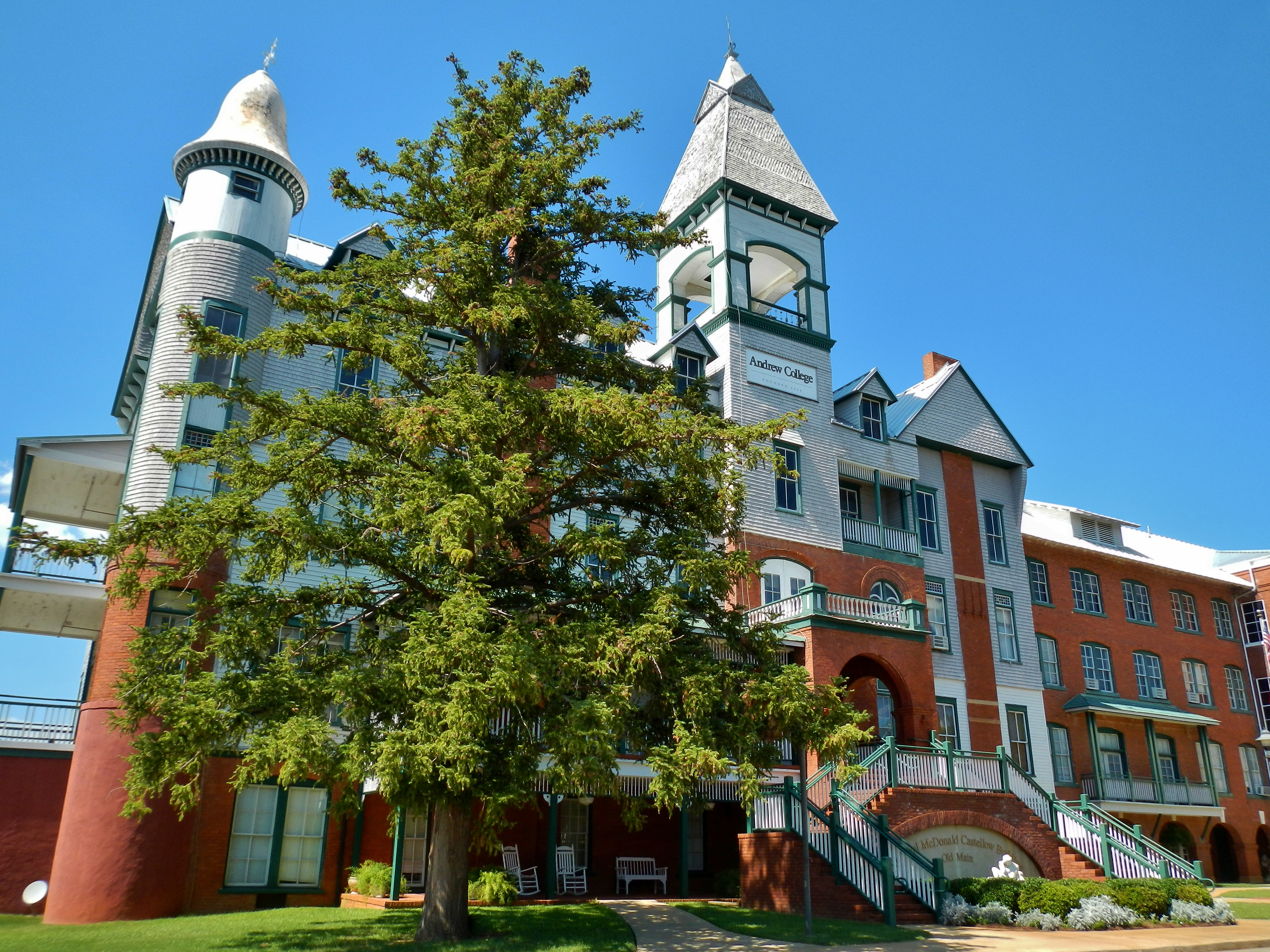
Cuthbert is the site of Andrew College, a private, Methodist, liberal arts junior college located a few blocks off the town square. The college is the ninth-oldest college in Georgia and is recognized as the second in the nation to grant degrees to women. During the Civil War, the college also distinguished itself as a Confederate hospital.

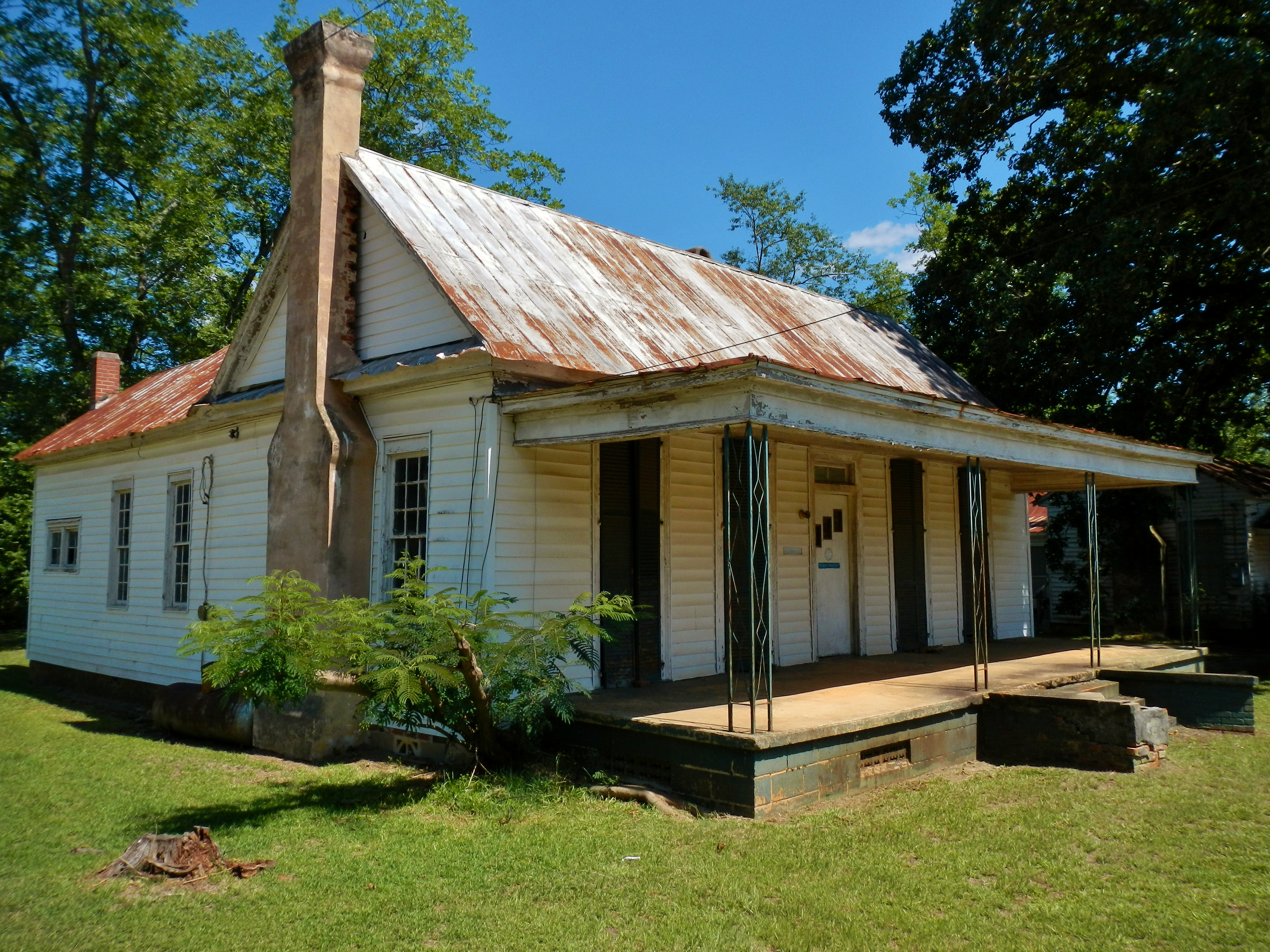
Cuthbert is the birthplace of jazz legend Fletcher Henderson. His birthplace was added to the National Register of Historic Places on June 17, 1982.

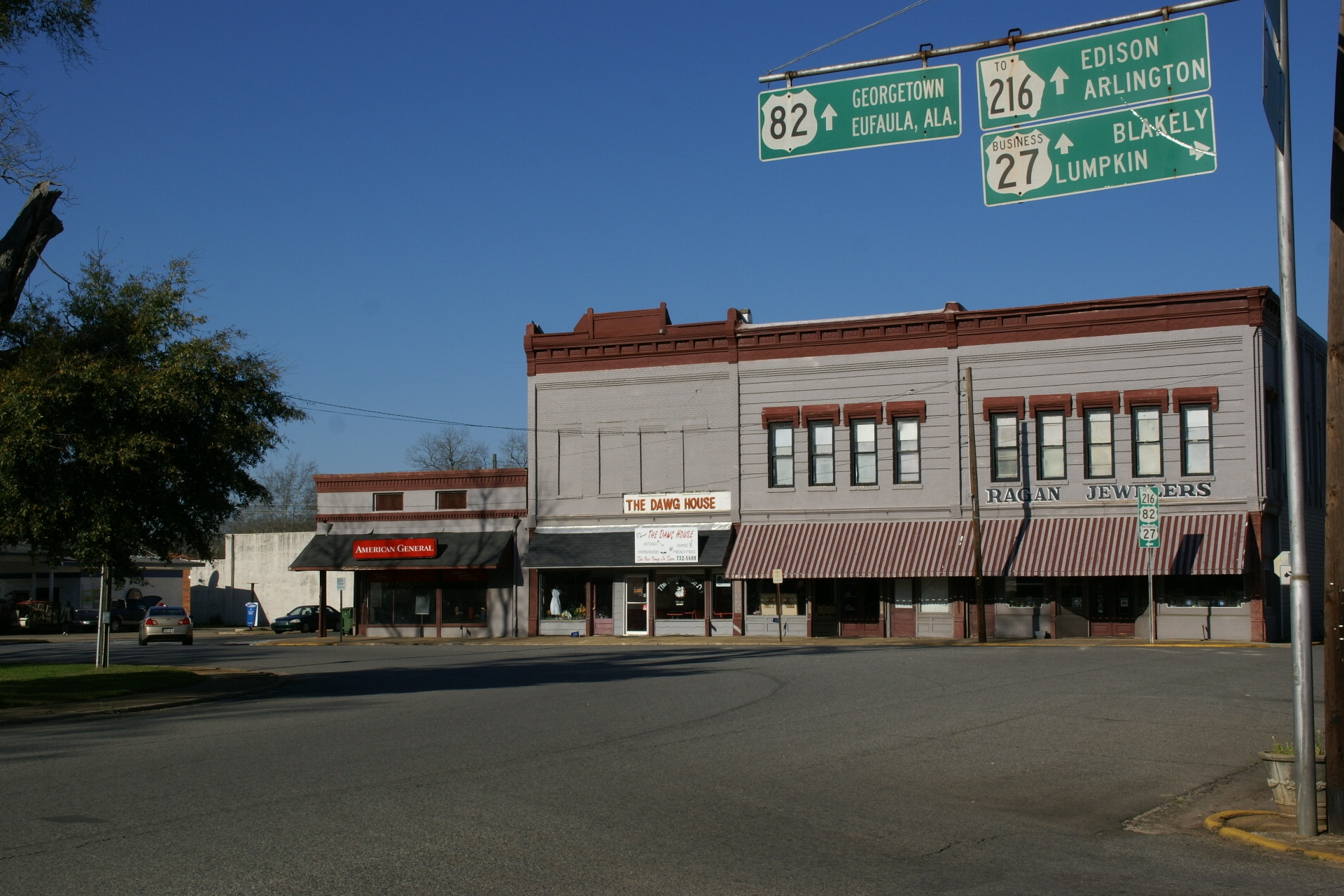
Cuthbert's Main Square is part of the Cuthbert Historic District which was added to the National Register of Historic Places on June 10, 1975.

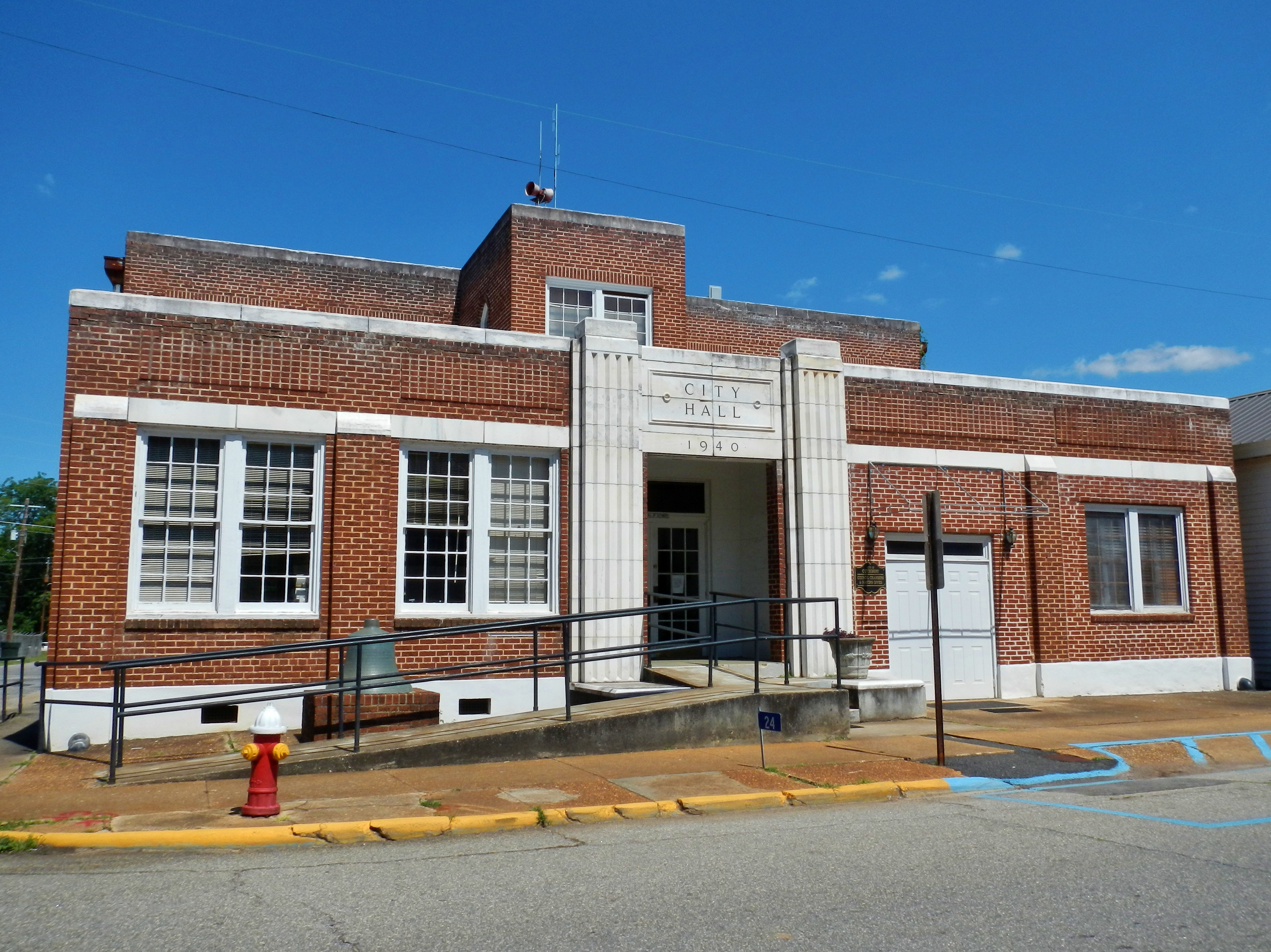
Cuthbert City Hall

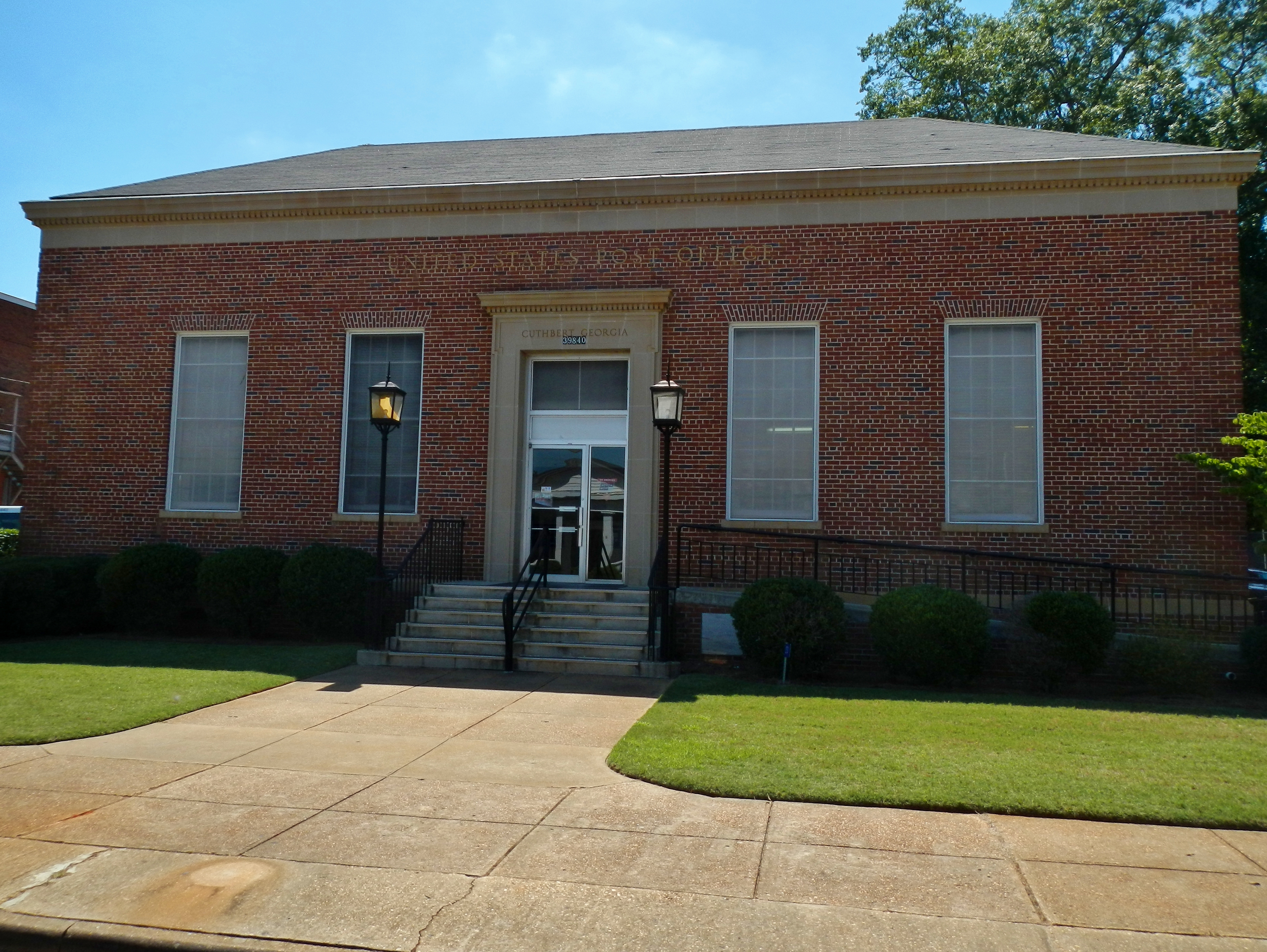
Cuthbert Post Office (ZIP code:39840)

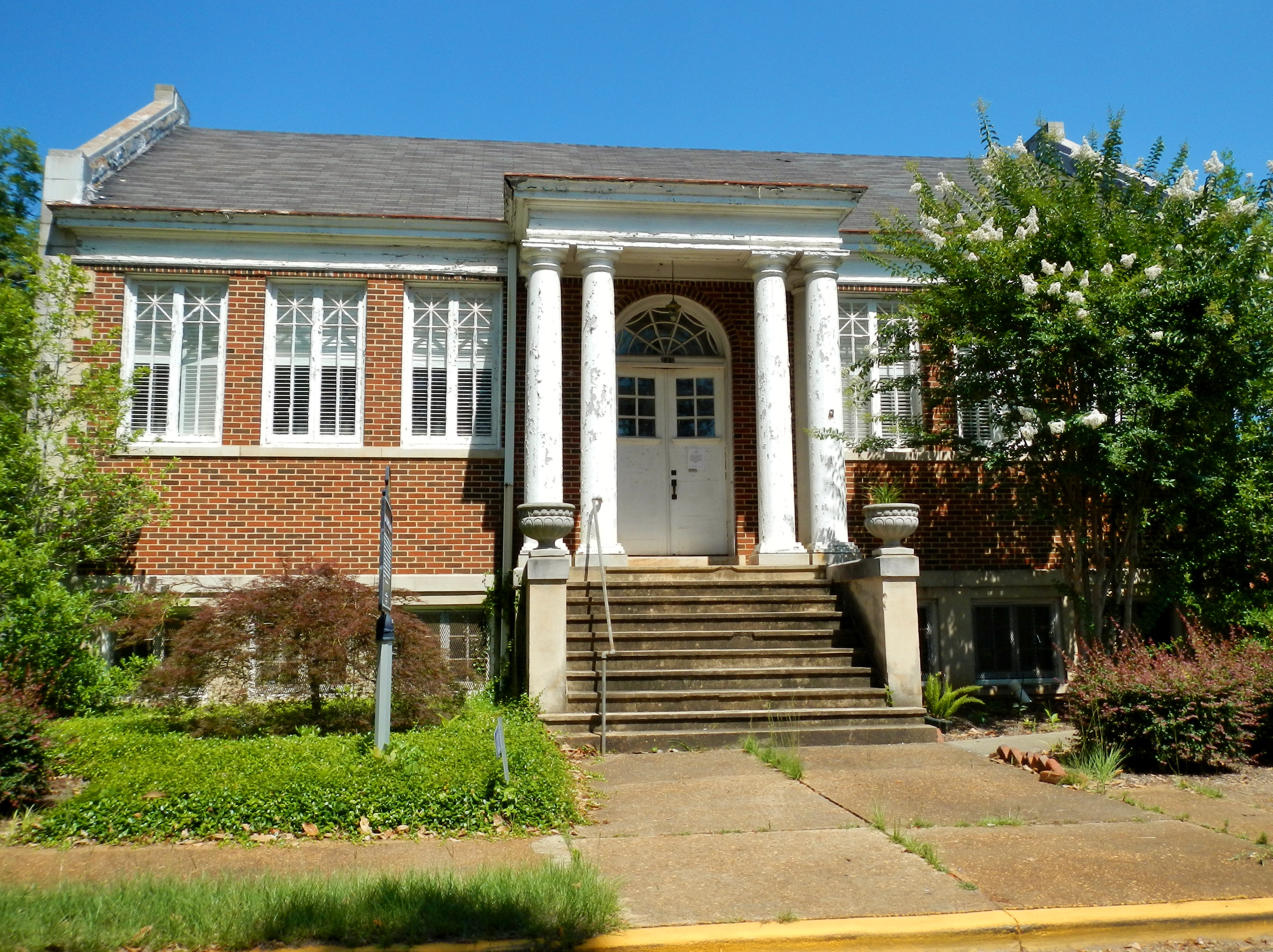
The Old Carnegie library was completed in 1918 and was originally used by the Kinchafoonee Regional Library System. The building is now used by the Randolph Chamber of Commerce.

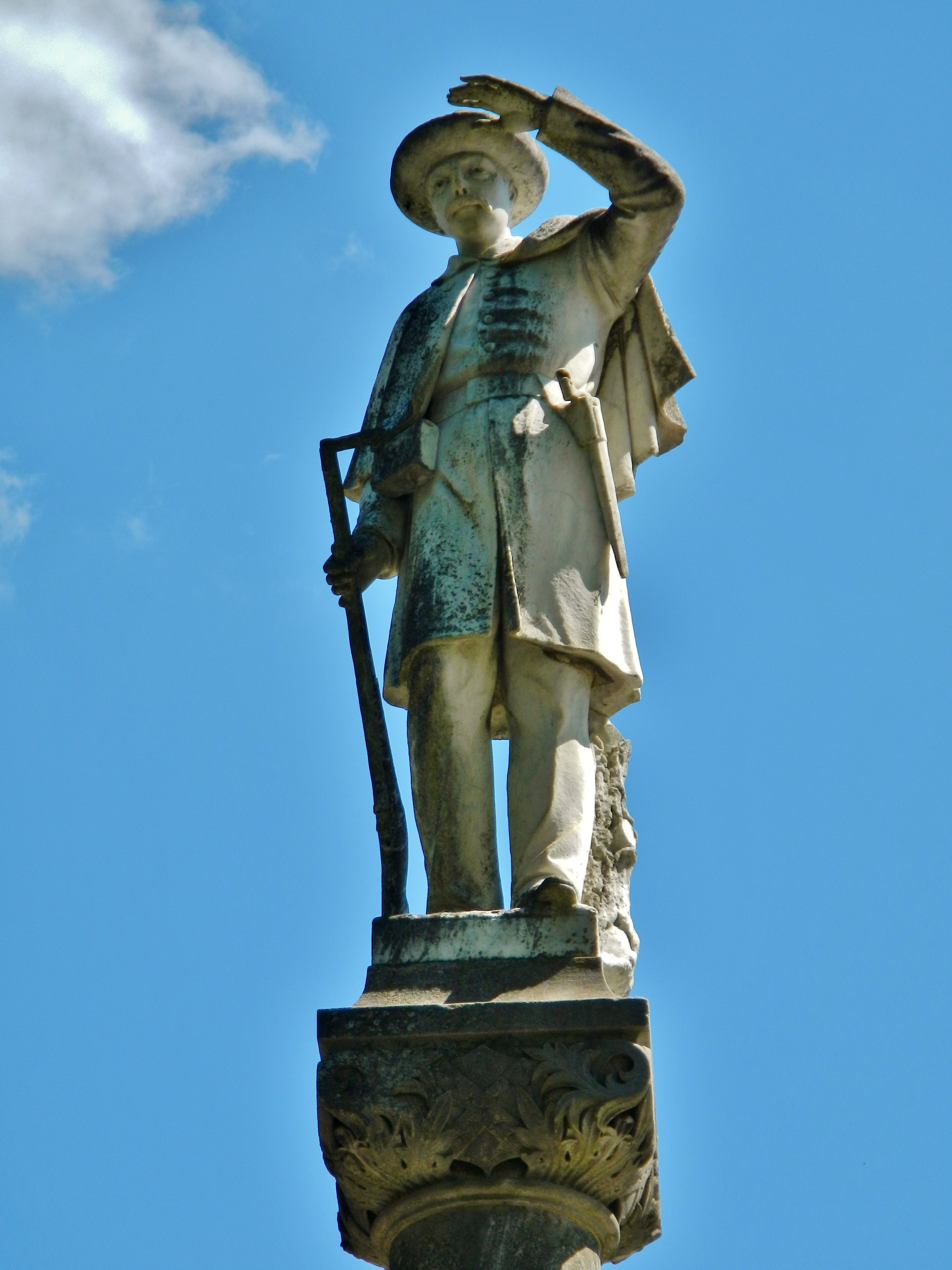
Close-up of the statue honoring Confederate dead in Cuthbert's Main Square.

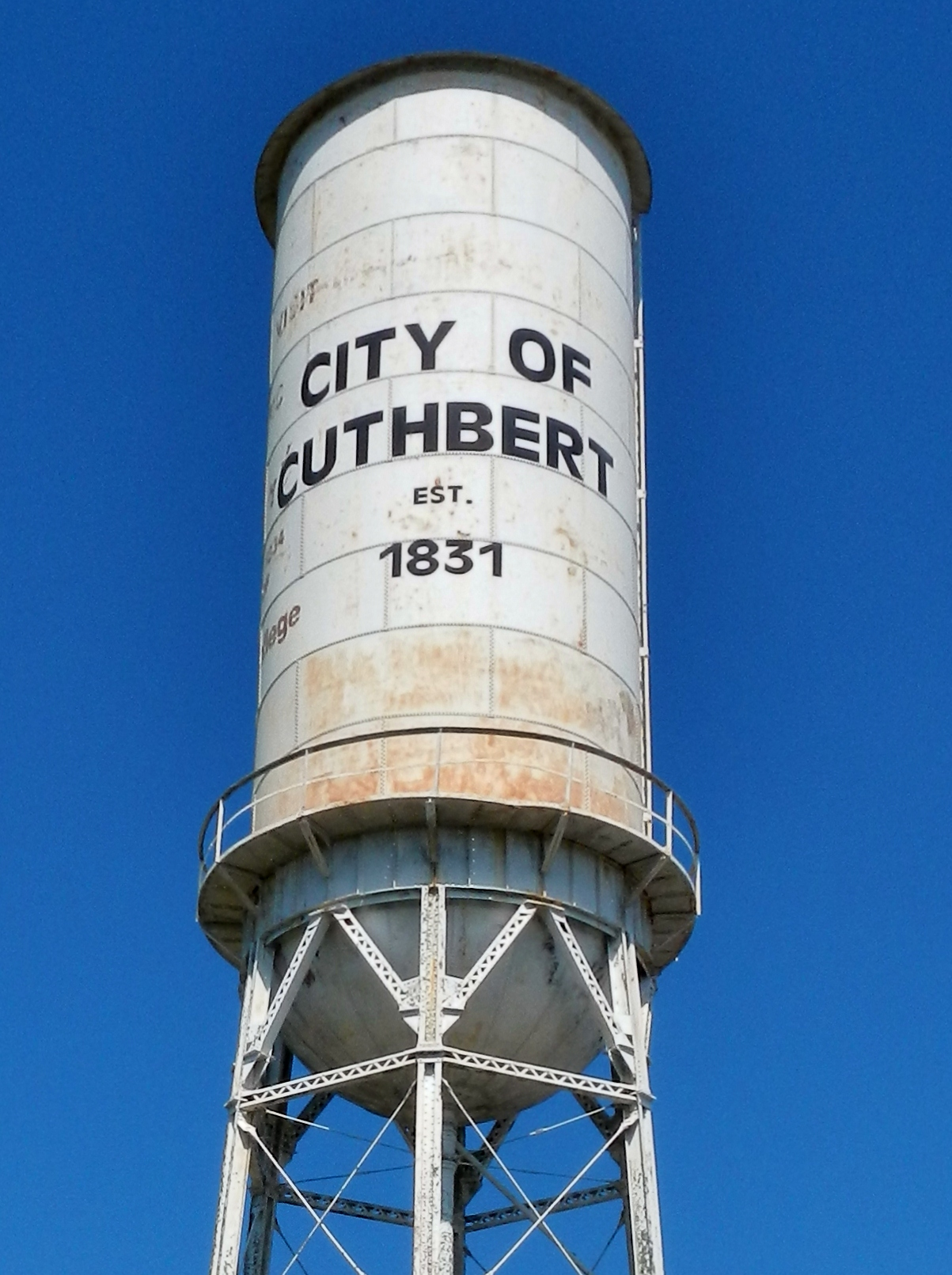
Water tower in Cuthbert.

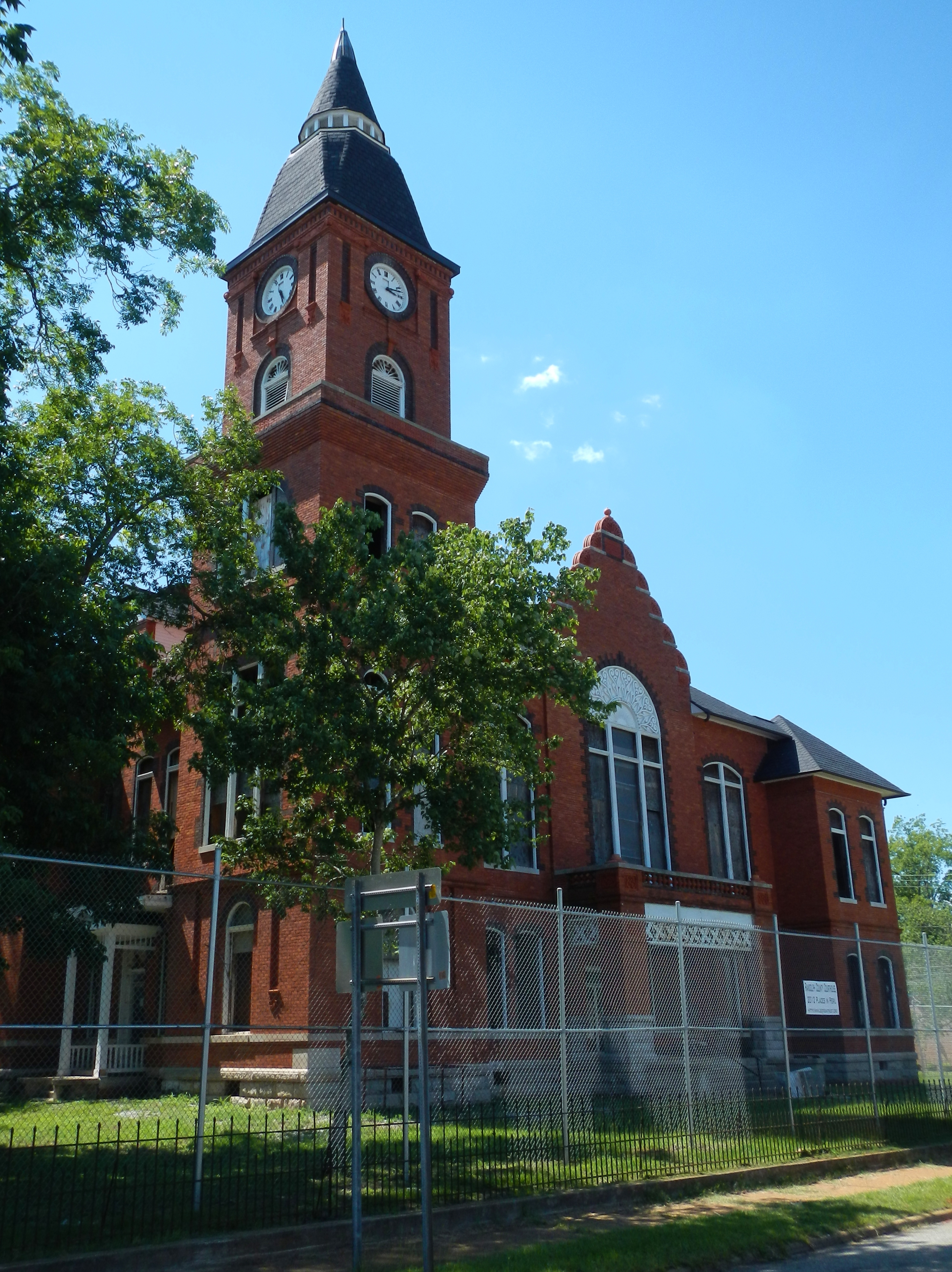
Built in 1886 in the Romanesque Revival style, the Randolph County Courthouse has been placed on the Georgia Trust for Historic Preservation's list of "Places in Peril" for 2012 due to extensive termite damage and general disrepair.

== Notable people ==
- Lena Baker (1900 – 1945), the only woman executed in the electric chair in Georgia; she was later pardoned by the state
- Jerry Braswell Jr. (born 1975), former European professional basketball player and Wake Forest Demon Deacon
- Thomas Davis (born 1983), NFL player, former UGA football player
- Harris DeVane (1963 – 2018), former stock car racing driver
- Roosevelt Grier (born 1932), former NFL player
- Franklin A. Hart (1894 – 1967), four-star general in the United States Marine Corps
- Donnell Harvey (born 1980), former NBA player, former University of Florida player
- Fletcher Henderson (1897 – 1952), influential jazz musician and bandleader
- Larry Holmes (born 1949), former world heavyweight boxing champion
- Dock J. Jordan (1866 – 1943), American lawyer, author, educator, civil rights activist; President of Edward Waters University and Kittrell College
- Winfred Rembert (1945 – 2021), leather-craft artist famous for surviving a lynching in Cuthbert
- Willa Holt Wakefield (1870 – 1946), vaudeville performer
- George Tyler Wood (1795 – 1858), second governor of Texas
- Richard R. Wright Jr. (1878 – 1967), sociologist and president of Wilberforce University.
