= Randolph County, Georgia =

County in Georgia, United States

- County
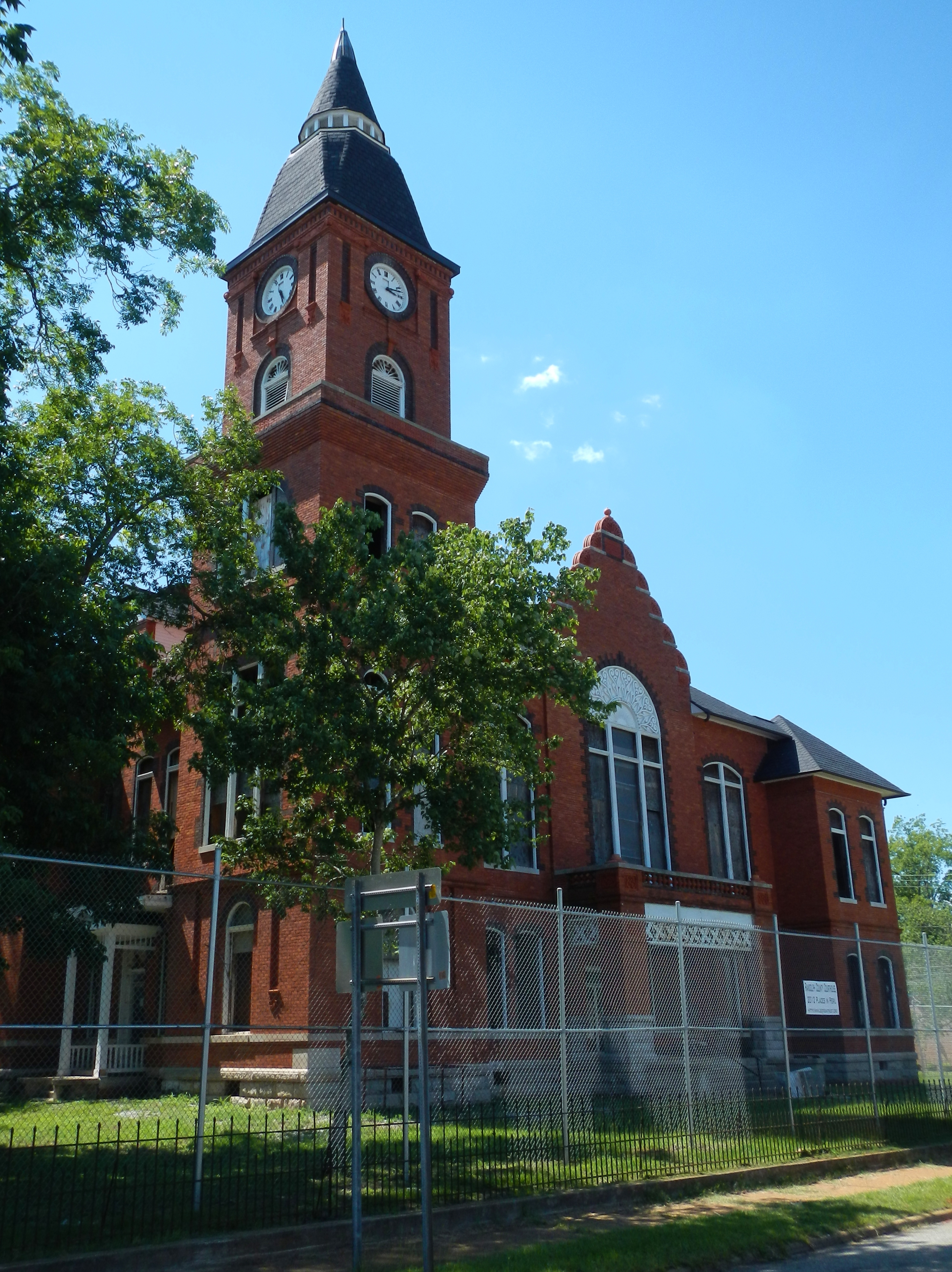
- The Randolph County Courthouse in Cuthbert was placed on the Georgia Trust for Historic Preservation's 2012 list of "Places in Peril" due to extensive termite damage and general disrepair. It has since been restored.

- Seal Logo

- Location within the U.S. state of Georgia
- Coordinates: 31°46′N 84°46′W
- Country: United States
- State: Georgia
- Founded: December 20, 1828; 197 years ago
- Named for: John Randolph of Roanoke
- Seat: Cuthbert
- Largest city: Cuthbert

Area
  - Total: 431 sq mi (1,120 km^{2})
  - Land: 428 sq mi (1,110 km^{2})
  - Water: 2.6 sq mi (6.7 km^{2}) 0.6%

Population (2020)
  - Total: 6,425
  - Estimate (2025): 6,156 ▼
  - Density: 15/sq mi (5.8/km^{2})
- Time zone: UTC−5 (Eastern)
  - Summer (DST): UTC−4 (EDT)
- Congressional district: 2nd
- Website: randolphcountyga.com

Randolph County is a county located in the western portion of the U.S. state of Georgia and is considered part of the Black Belt, historically an area of plantations. As of the 2020 census, the population was 6,425, roughly one-third of its peak population in 1910, when there were numerous agricultural workers. The county seat is Cuthbert.

== History ==
Randolph County was created on December 20, 1828, and named after the Virginia planter and politician John Randolph.

He was honored originally as the namesake of present-day Jasper County but, because of his opposition to U.S. entry into the War of 1812, the Georgia General Assembly changed the county name on December 10, 1812. Eventually, John Randolph's reputation was restored. In 1828, the General Assembly organized the current Randolph County in the west of the state. Most of the historic tribe of Muscogee people (Creek) were forced from the area to Indian Territory during Indian Removal.

Lumpkin, Georgia was the original county seat. It was within the portion of Randolph County that was reassigned in 1830 to form Stewart County, and Lumpkin was designated as the latter's county seat.

This area is considered part of the Black Belt, upland areas across the Deep South that were developed in the 19th century as plantations after invention of the cotton gin made processing of short-staple cotton profitable. Enslaved Blacks made up the vast majority of workers on the plantations, with hundreds of thousands being transported through the domestic slave trade from the coast and Upper South. After the American Civil War, many freedmen and their descendants continued to work on plantations in the county and region, comprising the majority of county population until the 1930s.

Like other areas of the rural South, workers in Randolph County lost jobs due to mechanization, invasion of the boll weevil, and the decline in agriculture. In the 20th century, many black families moved from the county to cities in the North and Midwest for work and less oppressive conditions during the Great Migration. However, the rural counties of the Black Belt continue to have substantial African-American populations. Agriculture has been industrialized and depends on relatively few workers.

By mid April 2020 Randolph County (including nearby Albany) hosted the third highest density of COVID-19 outbreaks in the nation, and as of May 2020, next to the New York Metro Area, and Boston, Massachusetts and metro area. Health department records showed an infection rate of 1.9 for every 100 citizens in Randolph County. The Randolph county outbreak was largely composed of an outbreak in a nursing home and may have had connections to the Procter & Gamble toilet paper factory in Albany, Georgia, which was deemed an essential service.

This county also has a history of poverty and has recently been ranked as the 2nd poorest county in the entire United States, behind Issaquena County, Mississippi. The county poverty rate is 26.7%, while the median household income is $25,425.

== Geography ==
According to the U.S. Census Bureau, the county has a total area of 431 square miles (1,120 km^{2}), of which 428 square miles (1,110 km^{2}) is land and 2.6 square miles (6.7 km^{2}) (0.6%) is water.

More than half of Randolph County, roughly east of U.S. Route 27, is located in the Ichawaynochaway Creek sub-basin of the ACF River Basin (Apalachicola–Chattahoochee–Flint River Basin). The northwestern portion of the county, from just south of Cuthbert north, is located in the Middle Chattahoochee River–Walter F. George Lake sub-basin of the same ACF River Basin. The southwestern corner, centered on Coleman, is located in the Lower Chattahoochee River sub-basin of the same larger ACF River Basin.

=== Major highways ===
- U.S. Route 27 / State Route 1
  - U.S. Route 27 Business / State Route 1 Business
- U.S. Highway 82 / State Route 50
- State Route 41
- State Route 216
- State Route 266

=== Adjacent counties ===
- Stewart County – north
- Webster County – northeast
- Terrell County – east
- Calhoun County – southeast
- Clay County – southwest
- Quitman County – west

== Communities ==
=== Cities ===
- Cuthbert
- Shellman

=== Census-designated place ===
- Coleman

=== Other unincorporated communities ===
- Benevolence
- Carnegie
- Springvale

== Demographics ==
Historical population
Census	Pop.	Note	%±
1830	2,191		—
1840	8,276		277.7%
1850	12,868		55.5%
1860	9,571		−25.6%
1870	10,561		10.3%
1880	13,341		26.3%
1890	15,267		14.4%
1900	16,847		10.3%
1910	18,841		11.8%
1920	16,721		−11.3%
1930	17,174		2.7%
1940	16,609		−3.3%
1950	13,804		−16.9%
1960	11,078		−19.7%
1970	8,734		−21.2%
1980	9,599		9.9%
1990	8,023		−16.4%
2000	7,791		−2.9%
2010	7,719		−0.9%
2020	6,425		−16.8%
2025 (est.)	6,156	▼	−4.2%
U.S. Decennial Census; 1790-1880 1890-1910; 1920-1930 1930-1940; 1940-1950 1960-1980; 1980-2000 2010 2020

=== Racial and ethnic composition ===
Randolph County, Georgia – Racial and ethnic composition Note: the US Census treats Hispanic/Latino as an ethnic category. This table excludes Latinos from the racial categories and assigns them to a separate category. Hispanics/Latinos may be of any race.
Race / Ethnicity (NH = Non-Hispanic)	Pop 1980	Pop 1990	Pop 2000	Pop 2010	Pop 2020	% 1980	% 1990	% 2000	% 2010	% 2020
White alone (NH)	4,170	3,303	3,016	2,781	2,250	43.44%	41.17%	38.71%	36.03%	35.02%
Black or African American alone (NH)	5,222	4,629	4,609	4,747	3,862	54.40%	57.70%	59.16%	61.50%	60.11%
Native American or Alaska Native alone (NH)	5	4	27	5	9	0.05%	0.05%	0.35%	0.06%	0.14%
Asian alone (NH)	18	46	12	22	21	0.19%	0.57%	0.15%	0.29%	0.33%
Native Hawaiian or Pacific Islander alone (NH)	x	x	9	0	3	x	x	0.12%	0.00%	0.05%
Other race alone (NH)	8	2	4	4	23	0.08%	0.02%	0.05%	0.05%	0.36%
Mixed race or Multiracial (NH)	x	x	22	41	114	x	x	0.28%	0.53%	1.77%
Hispanic or Latino (any race)	176	39	92	119	143	1.83%	0.49%	1.18%	1.54%	2.23%
Total	9,599	8,023	7,791	7,719	6,425	100.00%	100.00%	100.00%	100.00%	100.00%

=== 2020 census ===
As of the 2020 census, the county had a population of 6,425, 2,690 households, and 1,611 families residing in the county.

The median age was 41.9 years, 22.5% of residents were under the age of 18, and 21.7% were 65 years of age or older. For every 100 females there were 86.5 males, and for every 100 females age 18 and over there were 81.6 males age 18 and over. No residents lived in urban areas while 100.0% lived in rural areas.

The racial makeup of the county was 35.1% White, 60.3% Black or African American, 0.2% American Indian and Alaska Native, 0.3% Asian, 0.0% Native Hawaiian and Pacific Islander, 1.4% from some other race, and 2.6% from two or more races. Hispanic or Latino residents of any race comprised 2.2% of the population.

Of the 2,690 households, 27.1% had children under the age of 18 living with them and 41.8% had a female householder with no spouse or partner present. About 34.7% of all households were made up of individuals and 16.0% had someone living alone who was 65 years of age or older.

There were 3,438 housing units, of which 21.8% were vacant. Among occupied housing units, 63.2% were owner-occupied and 36.8% were renter-occupied. The homeowner vacancy rate was 1.5% and the rental vacancy rate was 8.7%.

=== 2010 census ===
In 2010, there were 7,719 people, 3,187 households, and 2,011 families living in the county.

Among its 2010 population, the racial makeup of the county was 61.8% black or African American, 36.6% white, 0.3% Asian, 0.1% American Indian, 0.5% from other races, and 0.8% from two or more races. Those of Hispanic or Latino origin made up 1.5% of the population.

In terms of European-American ancestry, 11.7% identified as English, 8.1% were Irish, and 2.4% were American.

== Politics ==
As of the 2020s, Randolph County is a Democratic voting county, voting 54% for Kamala Harris in 2024. Like most majority African American counties, Randolph County leans Democratic, and has done so for decades. The last Republican to carry the county was Reagan in 1984.

For elections to the United States House of Representatives, Randolph County is part of Georgia's 2nd congressional district, currently represented by Sanford Bishop. For elections to the Georgia State Senate, Randolph County is part of District 12. For elections to the Georgia House of Representatives, Randolph County is part of District 154.

United States presidential election results for Randolph County, Georgia
Year	Republican		Democratic		Third party(ies)	
Year	No.	%	No.	%	No.	%
1912	44	7.18%	514	83.85%	55	8.97%
1916	23	3.23%	645	90.72%	43	6.05%
1920	51	8.72%	534	91.28%	0	0.00%
1924	88	13.41%	518	78.96%	50	7.62%
1928	177	18.06%	803	81.94%	0	0.00%
1932	31	2.24%	1,344	97.18%	8	0.58%
1936	74	5.75%	1,208	93.86%	5	0.39%
1940	143	9.91%	1,298	89.95%	2	0.14%
1944	106	8.38%	1,159	91.62%	0	0.00%
1948	134	13.81%	575	59.28%	261	26.91%
1952	507	26.32%	1,419	73.68%	0	0.00%
1956	547	25.69%	1,582	74.31%	0	0.00%
1960	457	24.14%	1,436	75.86%	0	0.00%
1964	1,656	63.18%	962	36.70%	3	0.11%
1968	502	16.91%	1,028	34.64%	1,438	48.45%
1972	1,603	66.76%	798	33.24%	0	0.00%
1976	747	25.47%	2,186	74.53%	0	0.00%
1980	879	32.05%	1,861	67.85%	3	0.11%
1984	1,578	52.04%	1,454	47.96%	0	0.00%
1988	1,319	48.94%	1,369	50.80%	7	0.26%
1992	887	29.98%	1,756	59.34%	316	10.68%
1996	816	34.24%	1,438	60.34%	129	5.41%
2000	1,174	45.70%	1,381	53.76%	14	0.54%
2004	1,418	46.49%	1,612	52.85%	20	0.66%
2008	1,370	42.59%	1,833	56.98%	14	0.44%
2012	1,271	41.54%	1,770	57.84%	19	0.62%
2016	1,271	43.84%	1,598	55.12%	30	1.03%
2020	1,390	45.23%	1,671	54.38%	12	0.39%
2024	1,373	45.92%	1,601	53.55%	16	0.54%

United States Senate election results for Randolph County, Georgia2
Year	Republican		Democratic		Third party(ies)	
Year	No.	%	No.	%	No.	%
2020	1,404	46.17%	1,606	52.81%	31	1.02%
2020	1,290	43.55%	1,672	56.45%	0	0.00%

United States Senate election results for Randolph County, Georgia3
Year	Republican		Democratic		Third party(ies)	
Year	No.	%	No.	%	No.	%
2020	706	23.36%	1,179	39.01%	1,137	37.62%
2020	1,391	45.43%	1,671	54.57%	0	0.00%
2022	1,158	45.47%	1,366	53.63%	23	0.90%
2022	1,058	43.92%	1,351	56.08%	0	0.00%

Georgia Gubernatorial election results for Randolph County
Year	Republican		Democratic		Third party(ies)	
Year	No.	%	No.	%	No.	%
2022	1,243	48.46%	1,317	51.35%	5	0.19%

== Education ==
Public education is provided by the Randolph County School District.

== See also ==
- National Register of Historic Places listings in Randolph County, Georgia
- List of counties in Georgia
