= National Register of Historic Places listings in Clay County, Georgia =

This is a list of properties and districts in Clay County, Georgia that are listed on the National Register of Historic Places (NRHP).

This National Park Service list is complete through NPS recent listings posted March 21, 2025.

== Current listings ==
	Name on the Register	Image	Date listed	Location	City or town	Description
1	Clay County Courthouse	Clay County Courthouse	September 18, 1980 (#80000992)	Off GA 37; 31°36′15″N 85°02′54″W	Fort Gaines	Two-story brick building which looks more like a plantation house than a courthouse. Part of the Fort Gaines Historic District.
2	Dill House	Dill House	May 6, 1975 (#75000582)	102 S. Washington St. 31°36′22″N 85°02′55″W	Fort Gaines	
3	Fort Gaines Cemetery Site		December 16, 1974 (#74000669)	S of SR 37, W of Chattahoochee River; 31°36′07″N 85°03′08″W	Fort Gaines	
4	Fort Gaines Historic District	Fort Gaines Historic District	May 17, 1984 (#84000970)	Roughly bounded by Chattahoochee River, GA 37, GA 39, College, Commerce and Jefferson Sts. 31°36′27″N 85°03′02″W	Fort Gaines	
5	Warren Sutton House		March 24, 1994 (#93001571)	US 27 1000 ft. S of jct. with GA 37 at Sutton's Corners; 31°35′50″N 84°50′41″W	Edison	
6	Toney-Standley House		September 17, 1974 (#74000670)	NW of Fort Gaines off GA 39; 31°42′55″N 85°05′20″W	Fort Gaines	

== Former listings ==
	Name on the Register	Image	Date listed	Date removed	Location	City or town	Description
1	Walter F. George Dam Mound		January 21, 1975 (#75000583)	August 1, 1986	SE of Walter F. George Lock and Dam	Fort Gaines	
