= Dill House =

Dill House may refer to:

- Dill House (Fort Gaines, Georgia), listed on the National Register of Historic Places (NRHP)
- Charles W. Dill House, Shoshone, Idaho, NRHP-listed in Lincoln County
- Richard E. Dill House, Alexandria, Nebraska, NRHP-listed

== See also ==
- Dill Building, Boston, Massachusetts, NRHP-listed
- Dill Farm, Shawangunk, New York, NRHP-listed
- Dill Farm Site, Sandtown, Delaware, NRHP-listed
- Dill School, Ida, Arkansas, NRHP-listed
- Dill's Tavern, Dillsburg, Pennsylvania, NRHP-listed
- Dille-Probst House, South Bend, Indiana, NRHP-listed
- Dills Site, Frankfort, Kentucky, NRHP-listed in Franklin County
- Harrison Dills House, Yakima, Washington, NRHP-listed in Yakima County
