= National Register of Historic Places listings in Calhoun County, Georgia =

This is a list of properties and districts in Calhoun County, Georgia that are listed on the National Register of Historic Places (NRHP).

This National Park Service list is complete through NPS recent listings posted March 21, 2025.

== Current listings ==
	Name on the Register	Image	Date listed	Location	City or town	Description
1	Arlington Methodist Episcopal Church, South	Arlington Methodist Episcopal Church, South	April 5, 1990 (#90000572)	Pioneer Rd. at Dogwood Dr. 31°26′21″N 84°43′38″W	Arlington	
2	Edison Commercial Historic District	Edison Commercial Historic District	May 26, 2000 (#00000528)	Hartford St./GA 37 and Turner St./GA216; 31°33′28″N 84°44′26″W	Edison	Hartford St.
