= Calhoun County, Georgia =

County in Georgia, United States

- County
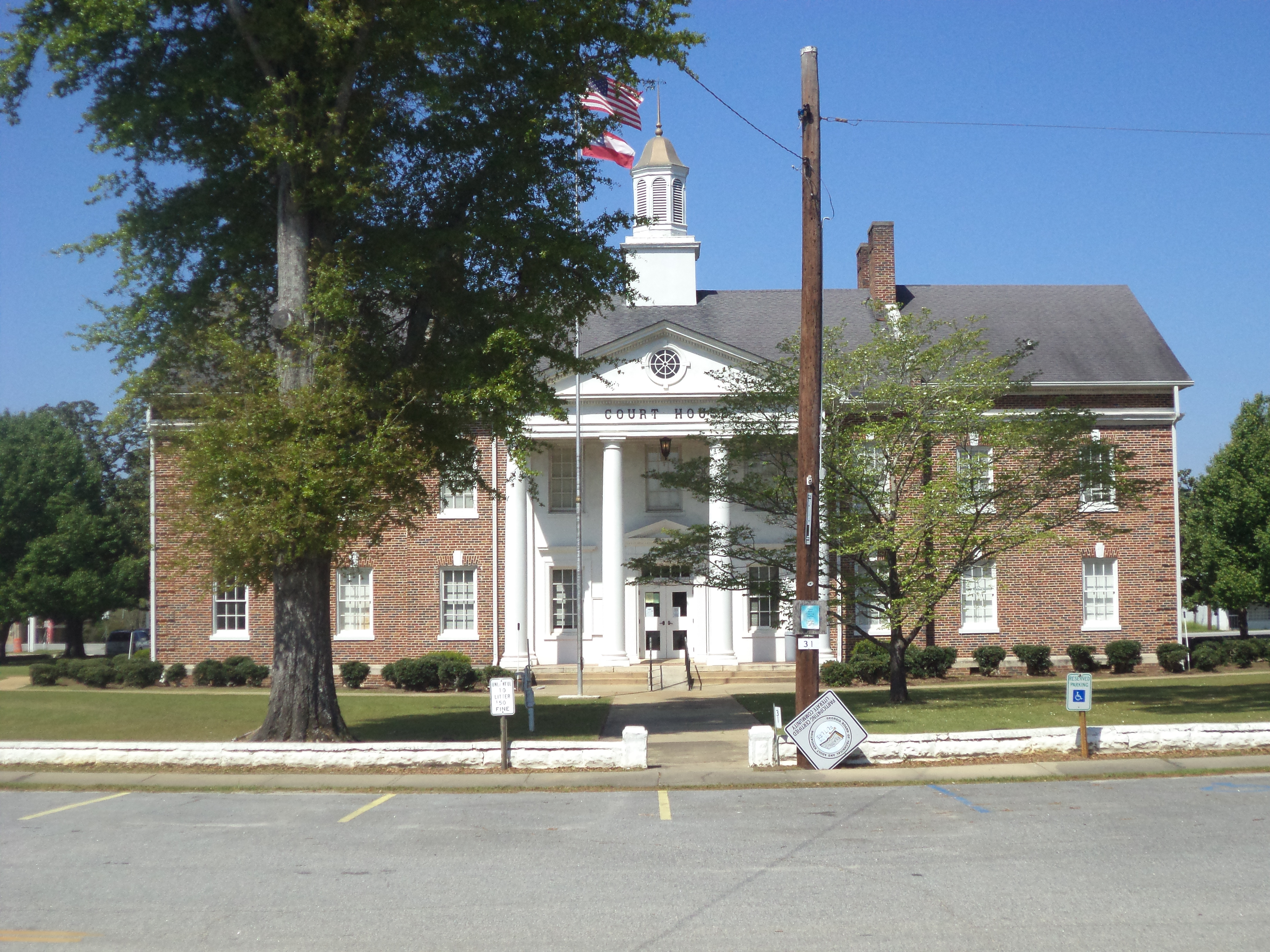
- Calhoun County Courthouse in Morgan

- Location within the U.S. state of Georgia
- Coordinates: 31°32′N 84°37′W
- Country: United States
- State: Georgia
- Founded: February 20, 1854; 172 years ago
- Named for: John C. Calhoun
- Seat: Morgan
- Largest city: Morgan

Area
  - Total: 284 sq mi (740 km^{2})
  - Land: 280 sq mi (730 km^{2})
  - Water: 3.2 sq mi (8.3 km^{2}) 1.1%

Population (2020)
  - Total: 5,573
  - Estimate (2025): 5,413 ▼
  - Density: 20/sq mi (7.7/km^{2})
- Time zone: UTC−5 (Eastern)
  - Summer (DST): UTC−4 (EDT)
- Congressional district: 2nd
- Website: calhouncountyga.com

Calhoun County is a rural county in the southwestern part of the U.S. state of Georgia. Its county seat is Morgan and its population was 5,573 in 2020.

== History ==
Calhoun County was named for John C. Calhoun, the seventh Vice President of the United States. It was created from parts of Early and Baker counties on February 20, 1854.

Rival political factions disagreed about whether the county seat should be in Concord, a community north of present-day Leary, or in Dickey, then known as Whitney. As a compromise, a spot halfway between Concord and Whitney was chosen for the county seat, and the town of Morgan was established there.

In 1923 the state legislature moved the county seat to Arlington as directed by a county referendum. This decision was reversed in 1929, restoring Morgan as the county seat.

Calhoun Memorial Hospital, a 25-bed critical access hospital in Arlington originally founded as a Hill-Burton hospital, closed in 2013 after 62 years of operation.

In 2008, members of the Downtown Business Authority in Arlington founded the South Georgia Regional Information Technology Authority (SGRITA) with help from the state government to provide wireless broadband service to several counties in rural southwest Georgia. In 2017 SGRITA moved its office to Blakely in Early County.

== Geography ==
The county seat is Morgan, where the historic Calhoun County Courthouse is located. According to the U.S. Census Bureau, the county has a total area of 284 square miles (740 km^{2}), of which 280 square miles (730 km^{2}) is land and 3.2 square miles (8.3 km^{2}) (1.1%) is water.

The vast majority of Calhoun County is in the Ichawaynochaway Creek sub-basin of the ACF River Basin (Apalachicola-Chattahoochee-Flint River Basin). The county's western and southwestern corner, from Arlington running northwest to west of Edison, is in the Spring Creek sub-basin of the same larger ACF River Basin.

The United States Department of Agriculture has designated most of the county's land as prime farmland. Agricultural, forestry, and wildlife plantations line the county's eastern edge.

=== Adjacent counties ===
- Terrell County (northeast)
- Dougherty County (east)
- Baker County (southeast)
- Early County (southwest)
- Clay County (west)
- Randolph County (northwest)

== Communities ==
=== Cities ===
- Arlington (Partly in Early County)
- Edison
- Leary
- Morgan

=== Unincorporated communities ===
- Dickey
- Williamsburg

== Demographics ==
Historical population
Census	Pop.	Note	%±
1860	4,913		—
1870	5,503		12.0%
1880	7,024		27.6%
1890	8,438		20.1%
1900	9,274		9.9%
1910	11,334		22.2%
1920	10,225		−9.8%
1930	10,576		3.4%
1940	10,438		−1.3%
1950	8,578		−17.8%
1960	7,341		−14.4%
1970	6,606		−10.0%
1980	5,717		−13.5%
1990	5,013		−12.3%
2000	6,320		26.1%
2010	6,694		5.9%
2020	5,573		−16.7%
2025 (est.)	5,413	▼	−2.9%
U.S. Decennial Census; 1790-1880 1890-1910; 1920-1930 1930-1940; 1940-1950 1960-1980; 1980-2000 2010 2020

=== Racial and ethnic composition ===
Calhoun County, Georgia – Racial and ethnic composition Note: the US Census treats Hispanic/Latino as an ethnic category. This table excludes Latinos from the racial categories and assigns them to a separate category. Hispanics/Latinos may be of any race.
Race / Ethnicity (NH = Non-Hispanic)	Pop 1980	Pop 1990	Pop 2000	Pop 2010	Pop 2020	% 1980	% 1990	% 2000	% 2010	% 2020
White alone (NH)	2,402	2,047	2,368	2,250	1,766	42.02%	40.83%	37.47%	33.61%	31.69%
Black or African American alone (NH)	3,239	2,945	3,726	4,092	3,569	56.66%	58.75%	58.96%	61.13%	64.04%
Native American or Alaska Native alone (NH)	9	12	9	9	8	0.16%	0.24%	0.14%	0.13%	0.14%
Asian alone (NH)	12	1	4	30	19	0.21%	0.02%	0.06%	0.45%	0.34%
Native Hawaiian or Pacific Islander alone (NH)	x	x	0	0	0	x	x	0.00%	0.00%	0.00%
Other race alone (NH)	0	0	0	2	1	0.00%	0.00%	0.00%	0.03%	0.02%
Mixed race or Multiracial (NH)	x	x	24	49	61	x	x	0.38%	0.73%	1.09%
Hispanic or Latino (any race)	55	8	189	262	149	0.96%	0.16%	2.99%	3.91%	2.67%
Total	5,717	5,013	6,320	6,694	5,573	100.00%	100.00%	100.00%	100.00%	100.00%

=== 2020 census ===
As of the 2020 census, the county had a population of 5,573 people and 1,671 households. A total of 1,152 families resided in the county, and the average household size was 2.56. Of the residents, 15.9% were under the age of 18 and 16.8% were 65 years of age or older; the median age was 41.6 years. Another 4.0% were under 5 years old. The population was 39.3% female; for every 100 females there were 154.1 males, and for every 100 females age 18 and over there were 165.6 males. 0.0% of residents lived in urban areas and 100.0% lived in rural areas. The foreign-born population was 4.1% of the total, and 7.7% of residents aged 5 or older spoke a language other than English at home.

The racial makeup of the county was 32.0% White, 64.3% Black or African American, 0.1% American Indian and Alaska Native, 0.3% Asian, 0.0% Native Hawaiian and Pacific Islander, 1.8% from some other race, and 1.4% from two or more races. Hispanic or Latino residents of any race comprised 2.7% of the population.

Of the 1,671 households in the county, 29.3% had children under the age of 18 living with them and 42.4% had a female householder with no spouse or partner present. About 33.5% of all households were made up of individuals and 15.0% had someone living alone who was 65 years of age or older.

There were 2,020 housing units, of which 17.3% were vacant. Among occupied housing units, 66.5% were owner-occupied and 33.5% were renter-occupied. The homeowner vacancy rate was 1.1% and the rental vacancy rate was 8.1%.

== Economy ==
Many farms in Calhoun County grow corn, oats, sorghum, and wheat. Calhoun State Prison in Morgan is a major employer. Calhoun Nursing Home, a 60-bed long-term care facility in Edison, is now operated by Miller County.

== Education ==
The Calhoun County School District has an elementary school and a middle-high school all in Edison. The district has about 530 students.

Pataula Charter Academy opened in 2010 in Edison as a tuition-free public charter school serving several counties in southwest Georgia. It has about 609 students in kindergarten through 12th grade.

The Calhoun County Library in Edison is part of the Kinchafoonee Regional Library System.

== Government ==
Calhoun County has a council-manager government with five commissioners elected by district.

== Politics ==
As of the 2020s, Calhoun County is a Democratic stronghold, voting 56% for Kamala Harris in 2024. Calhoun County is usually staunchly Democratic in US presidential elections. The last Republican candidate to win the county was Richard Nixon in 1972.

For elections to the United States House of Representatives, Calhoun County is part of Georgia's 2nd congressional district, currently represented by Sanford Bishop. For elections to the Georgia State Senate, Calhoun County is part of District 12. For elections to the Georgia House of Representatives, Calhoun County is part of District 154.

United States presidential election results for Calhoun County, Georgia
Year	Republican		Democratic		Third party(ies)	
Year	No.	%	No.	%	No.	%
1912	70	16.24%	300	69.61%	61	14.15%
1916	2	0.72%	265	96.01%	9	3.26%
1920	5	1.10%	449	98.90%	0	0.00%
1924	66	16.02%	343	83.25%	3	0.73%
1928	91	13.75%	571	86.25%	0	0.00%
1932	10	2.01%	483	97.18%	4	0.80%
1936	14	1.77%	777	97.98%	2	0.25%
1940	33	5.13%	610	94.87%	0	0.00%
1944	37	4.79%	736	95.21%	0	0.00%
1948	36	7.00%	399	77.63%	79	15.37%
1952	147	15.36%	810	84.64%	0	0.00%
1956	107	8.91%	1,094	91.09%	0	0.00%
1960	131	14.03%	803	85.97%	0	0.00%
1964	1,066	78.67%	289	21.33%	0	0.00%
1968	234	12.25%	697	36.49%	979	51.26%
1972	892	64.31%	495	35.69%	0	0.00%
1976	436	23.83%	1,394	76.17%	0	0.00%
1980	652	31.24%	1,414	67.75%	21	1.01%
1984	776	41.88%	1,077	58.12%	0	0.00%
1988	644	41.52%	901	58.09%	6	0.39%
1992	464	22.99%	1,301	64.47%	253	12.54%
1996	541	28.96%	1,217	65.15%	110	5.89%
2000	768	40.70%	1,107	58.66%	12	0.64%
2004	890	44.08%	1,119	55.42%	10	0.50%
2008	862	38.97%	1,342	60.67%	8	0.36%
2012	883	40.34%	1,298	59.30%	8	0.37%
2016	830	40.99%	1,179	58.22%	16	0.79%
2020	923	41.99%	1,263	57.46%	12	0.55%
2024	900	43.77%	1,153	56.08%	3	0.15%

United States Senate election results for Calhoun County, Georgia2
Year	Republican		Democratic		Third party(ies)	
Year	No.	%	No.	%	No.	%
2020	933	42.96%	1,211	55.76%	28	1.29%
2020	828	40.79%	1,202	59.21%	0	0.00%

United States Senate election results for Calhoun County, Georgia3
Year	Republican		Democratic		Third party(ies)	
Year	No.	%	No.	%	No.	%
2020	510	23.72%	819	38.09%	821	38.19%
2020	826	40.65%	1,206	59.35%	0	0.00%
2022	724	42.64%	963	56.71%	11	0.65%
2022	664	41.79%	925	58.21%	0	0.00%

Georgia Gubernatorial election results for Calhoun County
Year	Republican		Democratic		Third party(ies)	
Year	No.	%	No.	%	No.	%
2022	793	44.95%	919	52.10%	52	2.95%

== Transportation ==
=== Major highways ===
- State Route 37
- State Route 41
- State Route 45
- State Route 55
- State Route 62
- State Route 216
- State Route 234

== See also ==
- National Register of Historic Places listings in Calhoun County, Georgia
