= Antonio Fleming =

American football player (born 1974)

No. 63
- Position: Guard

Personal information
- Born: February 6, 1974 (age 52); Edison, Georgia, U.S.
- Listed height: 6 ft 3 in (1.91 m)
- Listed weight: 309 lb (140 kg)

Career information
- High school: Calhoun County
- College: Georgia
- NFL draft: 1998: 7th round, 227th overall pick

Career history
- Dallas Cowboys (1998)*; Carolina Panthers (1998)*; Arizona Cardinals (1998)*; Frankfurt Galaxy (2000); Miami Dolphins (2000)*; Birmingham Thunderbolts (2001)
- * Offseason or practice squad member only

Antonio Fleming (born February 6, 1974) is an American former football offensive guard in the National Football League (NFL) for the Carolina Panthers and Arizona Cardinals. He also was a member of the Frankfurt Galaxy and Birmingham Thunderbolts. He played college football at the University of Georgia.

== Early life ==
Fleming attended Calhoun County High School. He was a two-way player at defensive tackle and tight end, while also being the long snapper. He recorded almost 300 tackles and 23 sacks in his last three years.

As a senior, he registered 21 receptions for 356 yards, 3 receiving touchdowns, 220 rushing yards, 2 rushing touchdowns and 3 two-point conversions. He received Class A All-state, All-Georgia and All-area honors at the end of the season.

He was a four-year starter for the basketball team. He also practiced track, finishing fourth in the state meet in the shot put as a freshman and in the discus throw as a junior.

== College career ==
Fleming accepted a football scholarship from the University of Georgia, where he was converted into an offensive lineman. As a redshirt freshman, he started 3 games at right guard. As a sophomore, he was a backup at right guard.

As a junior, he started every game at right guard and also saw some snaps at right tackle.

As a senior, he was the starter at left guard, contributing to the offense, averaging 432.6 yards per game, 31.6 points per game and 159.9 rushing yards. The team finished the season with a 10–2 record, a number-10 ranking in the final AP football poll and a victory over the University of Wisconsin in the 1998 Outback Bowl.

== Professional career ==
=== Dallas Cowboys ===
Fleming was selected by the Dallas Cowboys in the seventh round (227th overall) of the 1998 NFL draft. He was released on August 24.

=== Carolina Panthers ===
On August 31, 1998, he was signed by the Carolina Panthers to their practice squad.

=== Arizona Cardinals ===
On November 24, 1998, he was signed by the Arizona Cardinals to their practice squad. He was cut on August 30, 1999.

=== Frankfurt Galaxy (NFLE) ===
In 2000, he was selected by the Frankfurt Galaxy in the NFL Europe Draft. He was a starter at offensive guard.

=== Miami Dolphins ===
On July 7, 2000, he was signed as a free agent by the Miami Dolphins. He was released on July 31.

=== Birmingham Thunderbolts (XFL) ===
In 2001, he was selected by the Birmingham Thunderbolts in the 38th round (303rd overall) of the XFL draft. He played in 10 games during the league's lone season.
