= Calhoun County School District (Georgia) =

School district in Georgia (U.S. state)

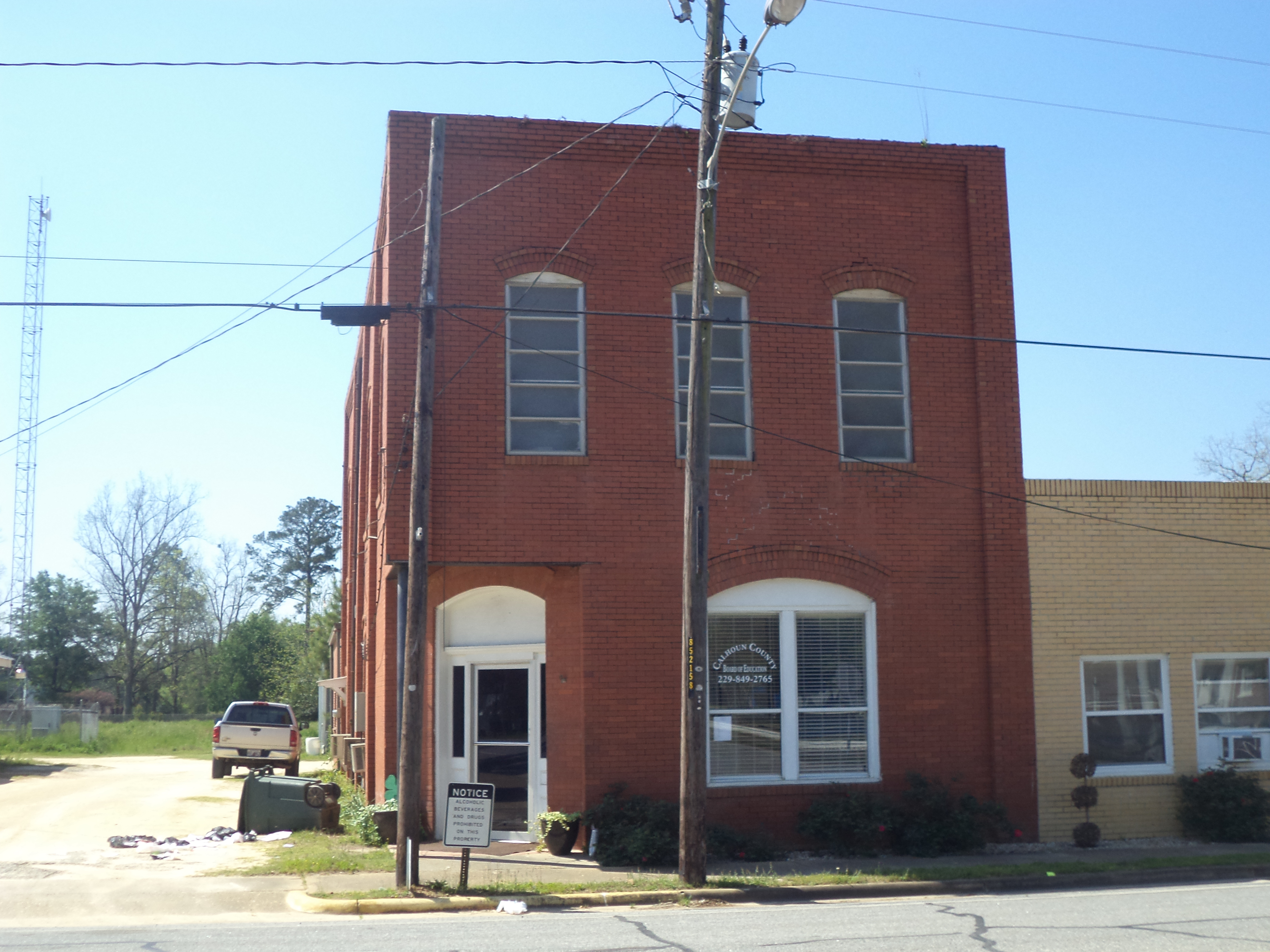

Address
- 113 East Main Street Morgan, Georgia, 39866-1766; United States
- Coordinates: 31.537725°N 84.599372°W

District information
- Grades: Pre-school - 12
- Superintendent: Michael Ward

Students and staff
- Enrollment: 719
- Faculty: 46

Other information
- Accreditation: Southern Association of Colleges and Schools; Georgia Accrediting Commission
- Fax: (229) 849-2113
- Website: www.calhoun.k12.ga.us

The Calhoun County School District is a public school district in Calhoun County, Georgia, United States, based in Morgan. It serves the communities of Arlington, Edison, Leary, and Morgan.

== Schools ==
The Calhoun County School District has one elementary school and one middle-high school.

=== Elementary school ===
- Calhoun County Elementary School

=== Middle-High school ===
- Calhoun County Middle-High School
