= Rodney Dent =

American basketball player (born 1970)

Personal information
- Born: December 25, 1970 (age 55) Edison, Georgia, U.S.
- Listed height: 6 ft 11 in (2.11 m)
- Listed weight: 245 lb (111 kg)

Career information
- High school: Calhoun County High (Edison, Georgia)
- College: Odessa (1989–1991); Kentucky (1992–1994)
- NBA draft: 1994: 2nd round, 31st overall pick
- Drafted by: Orlando Magic
- Position: Center
- Stats at Basketball Reference

Rodney Dent (born December 25, 1970) is an American former professional basketball player. Born in Edison, Georgia, Dent played college basketball at the University of Kentucky. He was drafted by the Orlando Magic in the 1994 NBA draft. He was selected by the Vancouver Grizzlies in the 1995 NBA expansion draft in exchange for a second-round draft pick.
