= Clay County School District =

Clay County School District may refer to:

- Clay County School District (Alabama)
- Clay County School District (Florida)
- Clay County School District (Georgia)
- Clay County School District (Mississippi)
- Clay County School District (North Carolina)
