= Calhoun County Courthouse =

Calhoun County Courthouse may refer to:

- Calhoun County Courthouse (Alabama), Anniston, Alabama
- Calhoun County Courthouse (Arkansas), Hampton, Arkansas
- Old Calhoun County Courthouse, Blountstown, Florida
- Calhoun County Courthouse (Georgia), Morgan, Georgia
- Calhoun County Courthouse (Illinois), Hardin, Illinois
- Calhoun County Courthouse (Iowa), Rockwell City, Iowa
- Calhoun County Courthouse (South Carolina), St. Matthews, South Carolina
