= Warren Sutton House =

Historic house in Georgia, United States

- U.S. National Register of Historic Places
- Location within Georgia Location within the United States
- Location: US 27 1000 ft. S of jct. with GA 37 at Sutton's Corners, Edison, Georgia
- Coordinates: 31.59711°N 84.84482°W
- Area: 2 acres (0.81 ha)
- Built by: Sutton, Warren
- Architectural style: Classical Revival
- NRHP reference No.: 93001571
- Added to NRHP: March 24, 1994

The Warren Sutton House, in Clay County, Georgia in the vicinity of Edison, Georgia, was built in 1912. It was listed on the National Register of Historic Places in 1994. It has also been known as the James Lowell Ingram Property.

It is a one-and-a-half-story, wood-framed, Classical Revival with a modified central hall plan. It was built in 1912 by Warren M. Sutton on a 2,000 acres (8.1 km^{2}) farm. Warren Sutton was successful as a cotton farmer, "assisted by 50 families farming as sharecroppers."
