= Knowledge Oasis Muscat =

Technology park in Oman

Coordinates: 23°34′3.33″N 58°10′12.6″E

Knowledge Oasis Muscat (KOM)
- Type: Free Economic Zone
- Headquarters: Muscat, Al Rusayl, Oman
- Website: http://www.kom.om

Knowledge Oasis Muscat (KOM) is a 1 million square meter technology park located near Muscat International Airport, Oman. KOM neighbours Rusayl Industrial Estate–the Sultanate's largest industrial park–and Sultan Qaboos University. For start-up companies that require a total support package, KOM created The Knowledge Mine (TKM) a business incubator program that offers tenants a combination of subsidized offices and utilities in addition to a variety of business support program services. KOM is also home to the Middle East College and the Waljat Colleges of Applied Sciences. Currently, the KOM campus boasts an undergraduate population of approximately 3,000 students.

KOM was built to support technology-focussed startup enterprises as well as corporate entities such as Ericsson, Oracle Corporation, Hewlett Packard, Motorola, Microsoft, Oman TradaNet llc, NCR, Wipro Gulf LLC and Huawei. It also host Oman's ITA which is the body that is responsible of managing the e-governance project in Oman.

== Sources ==
- Official website
