= Fort Gaines Historic District =

Historic district in Georgia, United States

- U.S. National Register of Historic Places
- U.S. Historic district
- Location within Georgia Location within the United States
- Location: Roughly bounded by Chattahoochee River, GA 37, GA 39, College, Commerce and Jefferson Sts., Fort Gaines, Georgia
- Coordinates: 31.6075°N 85.050556°W
- Area: 300 acres (1.2 km^{2})
- Built: 1930
- Architect: Multiple
- Architectural style: Greek Revival, Gothic, Neo-Classical Revival
- NRHP reference No.: 84000970
- Added to NRHP: May 17, 1984

The Fort Gaines Historic District in Fort Gaines, Georgia, is a 300 acres (1.2 km^{2}) historic district which was listed on the National Register of Historic Places in 1984.

It is roughly bounded by the Chattahoochee River, GA 37, GA 39, College, Commerce and Jefferson Streets. It includes Greek Revival, Gothic Revival, Neo-Classical Revival architecture., It includes the Clay County Courthouse.

It included 327 contributing buildings.

The NRHP nomination stated:

Fort Gaines is a good intact example of a frontier Georgia town planned and developed in the nineteenth century for a combination of military, political, and commercial purposes. It is historically significant in the areas of exploration and settlement, military history, community planning and development, architecture, landscape architecture, commerce, industry, transportation, politics and government, and historic archaeology.
