= Calhoun State Prison =

Prison in Morgan, Georgia, US

Coordinates: 31°32′23″N 84°37′00″W

- Interactive map of Calhoun State Prison
- Location: 27823 Main Street Morgan, Georgia
- Status: open
- Security class: medium
- Capacity: 1539
- Opened: 1994
- Managed by: Georgia Department of Corrections

Calhoun State Prison is located in Morgan, Georgia, in Calhoun County, Georgia. The facility houses adult male felons with a capacity of 1539. It was constructed in 1993 and opened in 1994. It was renovated in 1999 and 2008. It is a Medium Security Prison.
