= Williamsburg, Calhoun County, Georgia =

Unincorporated community in Georgia, U.S.

Coordinates: 31°27′51″N 84°35′53″W

Williamsburg is an unincorporated community in Calhoun County, in the U.S. state of Georgia.

== History ==
A post office called Williamsburg was established in 1873, and remained in operation until 1913. Variant names are "Williamsburg Crossroads" and "Williamsburgh".

The Georgia General Assembly incorporated Williamsburg as a town in 1887. The town's municipal charter was repealed in 1995.
