= Zetto, Georgia =

- Unincorporated community
- Location within the state of Georgia Zetto, Georgia (the United States)
- Coordinates: 31°35′37″N 84°56′13″W
- Country: United States
- State: Georgia
- County: Clay
- Elevation: 384 ft (117 m)
- Time zone: UTC-5 (Eastern (EST))
  - Summer (DST): UTC-4 (EDT)
- Area code: 229
- GNIS ID: 326605

Zetto is an unincorporated community in Clay County, Georgia, United States.
