= Dill House (Fort Gaines, Georgia) =

Historic house in Georgia, United States

- U.S. National Register of Historic Places
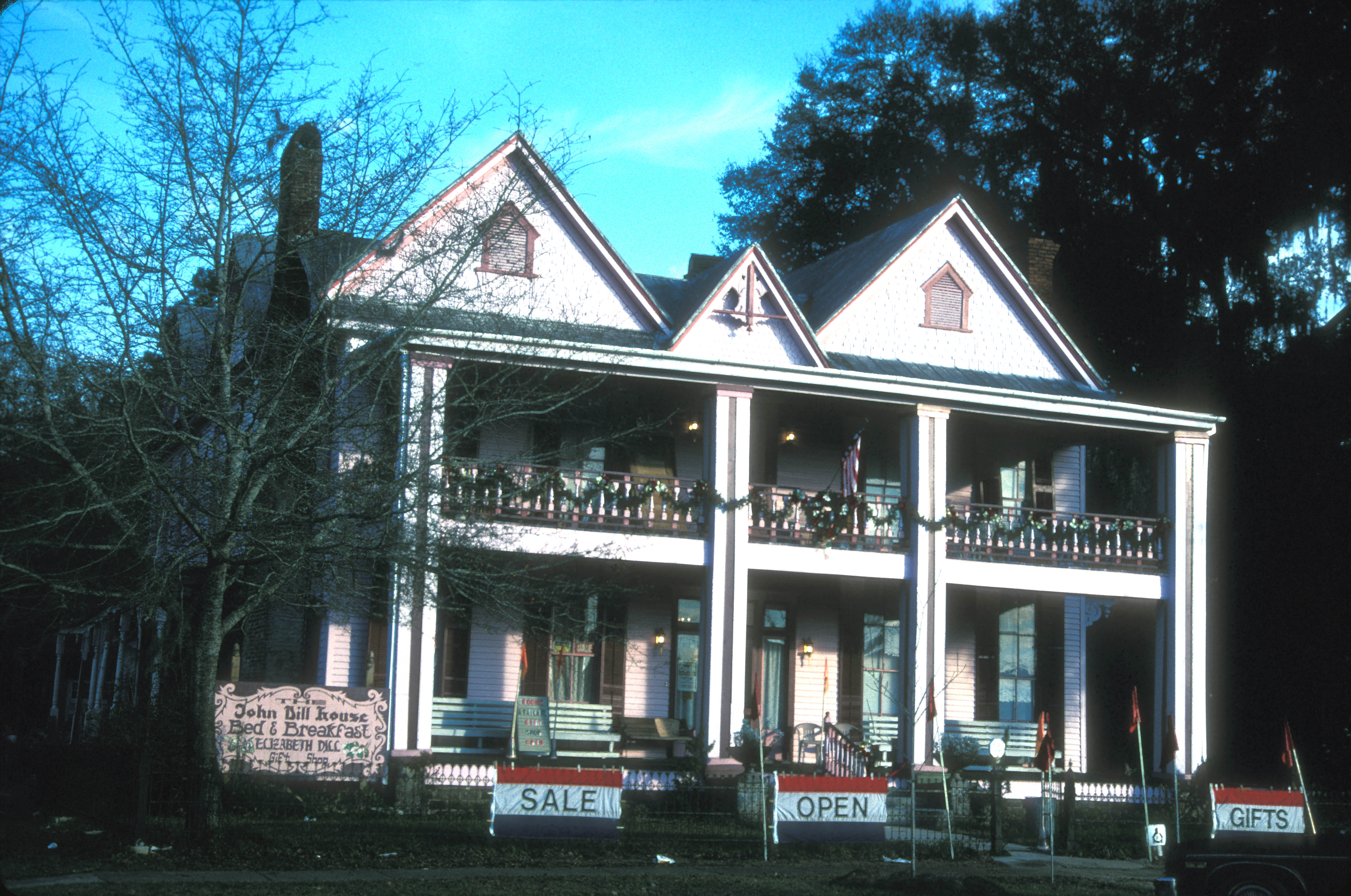

- Location within Georgia Location within the United States
- Location: 102 S. Washington St., Fort Gaines, Georgia
- Coordinates: 31.6062°N 85.04848°W
- Area: 0.3 acres (0.12 ha)
- Built: c.1830
- NRHP reference No.: 75000582
- Added to NRHP: May 6, 1975

The Dill House, located at 102 S. Washington St. in the city of Fort Gaines in Clay County, Georgia, was built c.1830. It was listed on the National Register of Historic Places in 1975.

It was the home of General John Dill, a prominent citizen and original settler of Fort Gaines. He came to the area as a military aide to General Edmund P. Gaines, and he was appointed to command Fort Gaines, a stronghold on the Chattahoochee River. The fort was no longer needed as a military facility after 1826, and General Dill retired and became a merchant in Fort Gaines.

The house was renovated into a hotel in the 1890s.

There are several legends associated with the house.
