= Dickey, Georgia =

Unincorporated community in Georgia, U.S.

Coordinates: 31°33′26″N 84°39′37″W

Dickey is an unincorporated community in Calhoun County, in the U.S. state of Georgia.

== History ==
A variant name was "Whitney". A post office called Dickey was established in 1889, and remained in operation until 1919.

The Georgia General Assembly incorporated Dickey as a town in 1900. The town's municipal charter was repealed in 1995.
