= Middle East College =

Higher education institution in Oman

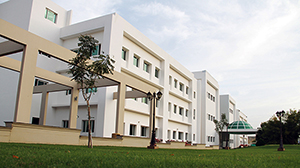
- Teaching and Learning Block 1, named after the Islamic mathematician, astronomer and geographer, Abu Abdallah Muhammad ibn Musa al-Khwarizmi
- Motto: Enterprising. Resilient. Impactful.
- Type: Private university college
- Established: 2002; 24 years ago
- Founders: Dr Abdullah Saif Ahmed Al Sabahi, Lefeer Muhamed Marakkarackayil
- Accreditation: Oman Authority for Academic Accreditation and Quality Assurance of Education (OAAAQA)
- Academic affiliations: Coventry University, NHTV Breda University of Applied Sciences
- Dean: Dr Saleh Al Shaaibi
- Students: c. 4500
- Location: Muscat, Oman; 23°34′04″N 58°10′05″E
- Campus: Over 10 ha (25 acres)
- Colours: Blue and red
- Website: mec.edu.om

Middle East College (MEC) is a private college based in Muscat, Oman. It is one of the leading higher education institution in the Sultanate of Oman, with over 4500 students. MEC is affiliated to Coventry University, UK. It is located in the Knowledge Oasis Muscat.

Middle East College has undergraduate and postgraduate programmes in the disciplines of engineering, business, and technology. MEC has partnerships with Microsoft IT Academy (ITA), Oracle Academy Initiative Program, Cisco Networking Academy Program, EC-Council Scholarship, SAP, Linux Professional Institute and Information Technology Authority, Oman.

== History ==
The Middle East College was founded in 2002 by Dr. Abdullah Saif Ahmed Al Sabahy, and Mr. Lefeer Muhamed, in association with Sultan's Special Forces Pension Fund (SSFPF).

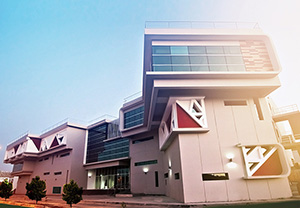
Teaching and Learning Block 2 (4,600m^{2}), named after Abu al-Walid Muhammad ibn Ahmad ibn Rushd, a philosopher and scientist

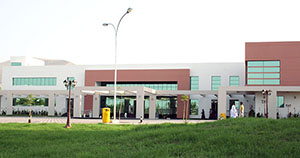
Learning Resources Block (4,200m^{2}), named after the Arab lexicographer and philologist, Al-Khalil ibn Ahmad al-Farahidi

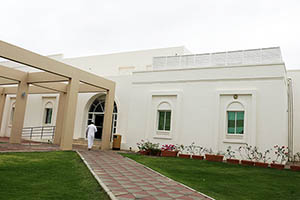
Facilities Centre (4,200m^{2}), named after the Arab historiographer and historian, Ibn Khaldūn

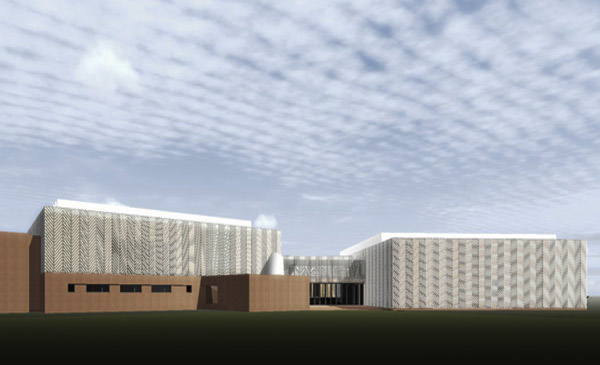
MEC Student Hub, opened in 2016

== Academic aspects ==
MEC is primarily a teaching college and not research led.

MEC has the following academic programmes:

- Mechanical Engineering
- Civil Engineering
- Electronics and Instrumentation
- Electronics and Telecommunication
- Computer Engineering (Cyber Security)
- Computer Engineering (Networking)
- Software Engineering (Work-Integrated programme)
- Quantity Surveying and Construction Management
- Computer Science (Data Analytics)
- Computer Science (Software Technology)
- Computer Science (Computer Science)
- Logistics Management
- Business Administration (General Management)
- Business Administration (Marketing)
- Business Administration (Human Resources)
- Business Administration (Accounting and Finance)
- Archives & Records Management
- Master of Business Administration (MBA)
- MSc in Data Science
- MSc in Cyber Security
- MSc in Fintech
- MSc in Construction Project and Cost Management
- MSc in Electronic Engineering
- MSc in Records and Information Management

== Accreditation ==
MEC is accredited by the Oman Authority for Academic Accreditation and Quality Assurance of Education (OAAAQA) with the highest ratings in the country for Teaching Quality and Research Performance.

In addition, several programmes are accredited or recognised by international professional bodies, including:

- Joint Board of Moderators (JBM) – covering civil engineering programmes
- Institution of Civil Engineers (ICE)
- Institute of Highway Engineers (IHE)
- Permanent Way Institution (Rail Infrastructure Engineers)
- Institution of Structural Engineers
- Chartered Institution of Highways and Transportation (CIHT)
- Chartered Institute of Logistics and Transport (CILT)
- European Network for Accreditation of Engineering Education (ENAEE)
- Chartered Management Institute (CMI)
- Chartered Institute of Library and Information Professionals (CILIP)
- Chartered Institute of Building (CIOB)

These affiliations link academic delivery at MEC with professional standards and graduate certification opportunities.

== Recognition ==
A 2023 survey by the Oman Economic Review ranked Middle East College as the most preferred private higher education institution in Oman for graduate recruitment.

In 2024, MEC received the award for Best Graduate Development Programme in the GCC at the HRM Summit held in Bahrain.

At the inaugural Times Higher Education Awards Arab World, the college was recognised among the top 8 institutions in the region in two categories:

- Outstanding Student Support (2025)
- Leadership and Management Team of the Year (2024)

== Student activities ==
Student clubs include a Computing Club, Electronics Club, Design Club, Photography Club, Math Club, Net Club, Business Society, Drama Society, and the English Speaking Society.

== International links ==
Students from 27 countries are undertaking their studies in Middle East College.

MEC has established links with academic institutions around the world to enable its students to participate in cultural exchange programs in:

- India
- Italy
- South Korea
- Spain
- United Kingdom

MEC partners with the following institutions:

- University of Coventry (UK)
- Breda University of Applied Sciences (UK)

=== Student chapters ===
- IEEE — MEC Student Branch, active since February 2015
- Institution of Civil Engineers (ICE) — chapter since April 2019
- American Society of Mechanical Engineers (ASME) — chapter since July 2018
- Institution of Mechanical Engineers (IMechE) — student chapter supporting mechanical engineering students

=== Google Developer Group ===
MEC hosts a Google Developer Group (GDG) on Campus chapter based in Muscat. The group has multiple members and organises workshops, tech talks, and speaker sessions on topics such as deep learning, AI in teaching, personal branding, and leadership. It provides students with exposure to emerging technologies, networking, and learning opportunities beyond regular coursework.

== Professional Partnerships ==
MEC holds multiple formal partnerships with global professional bodies and technology organisations to enhance skills, certifications, and exposure for students and staff:

- Microsoft IT Academy – first Microsoft IT Academy in Oman enabling Microsoft professional certifications.
- Oracle Academic Initiative – member offering Oracle-programmes.
- Cisco Networking Academy – prepares students for network-related industry certifications.
- EC-Council – access to information security education and certifications.
- SAP Academic Partnership – provides SAP course materials; access to ERP software.
- Information Technology Authority, Oman (ITA) – collaboration around free and open source software (FOSS) awareness.
- Linux Professional Institute (LPI) – academic partner; training and prep for LPI certification.
- Global Science and Technology Forum (GSTF), Singapore – partnership in science and technology initiatives.
- CompTIA – industry certifications in IT.
- TESOL International – membership for faculty development and access to teaching resources.
- British Council – hosts IELTS exam center; provides trial testing; staff development.

== See also ==
- List of universities and colleges in Oman
