= Toney-Standley House =

Historic house in Georgia, United States

- U.S. National Register of Historic Places
- Location within Georgia Location within the United States
- Location: Off GA 39 northwest of Fort Gaines, Georgia
- Coordinates: 31.71528°N 85.089°W
- Area: less than one acre
- Built: c.1810
- Architectural style: Plantation Plain
- NRHP reference No.: 74000670
- Added to NRHP: September 17, 1974

The Toney-Standley House in or near Fort Gaines, Georgia, United States, was built in c.1810. It was listed on the National Register of Historic Places in 1974. It has also been known as Col. William Toney House.

It is a Plantation Plain style house which was home of Creek Indian tradepost manager William Toney, significant partly as Aaron Burr stayed there, after his capture in 1807.
