= Pecan, Georgia =

Unincorporated community in Georgia, U.S.

Coordinates: 31°38′27″N 84°59′32″W

Pecan is an unincorporated community in Clay County, in the U.S. state of Georgia.

== History ==
A post office called Pecan was established in 1889, and remained in operation until 1906. Pecan is located within a pecan-growing region, hence the name.
