= Fort Gaines Cemetery Site =

Prehistoric mound in Clay County, Georgia

- U.S. National Register of Historic Places
- Location within Georgia Location within the United States
- Nearest city: Fort Gaines, Georgia
- Coordinates: 31°36′7″N 85°3′8″W
- Area: 9 acres (3.6 ha)
- Built: c. 850
- NRHP reference No.: 74000669
- Added to NRHP: December 16, 1974

The Fort Gaines Cemetery Site is a prehistoric mound, an archeological site, within the Fort Gaines Cemetery in Fort Gaines, Georgia.

As of 1974 it had not been excavated.
