= Clay County School District (Georgia) =

School district in Georgia (U.S. state)

Address
- 105 Washington Street Fort Gaines, Georgia, 39851; United States
- Coordinates: 31.607067°N 85.050702°W

District information
- Grades: Pre-school - 8
- Superintendent: John Hamilton
- Accreditation(s): Southern Association of Colleges and Schools; Georgia Accrediting Commission

Students and staff
- Enrollment: 358
- Faculty: 27

Other information
- Telephone: (229) 768-2232
- Fax: (229) 768-3654
- Website: www.clay.k12.ga.us

The Clay County School District is a public school district in Clay County, Georgia, United States, based in Fort Gaines. It serves the communities of Bluffton and Fort Gaines.

== Schools ==
The Clay County School District has one elementary school and one middle school. High school aged students attend 9-12th grade in adjoining Randolph County, Georgia or Quitman County, Georgia.

=== Elementary school ===
- Clay County Elementary School

=== Middle school ===
- Clay County Middle School
