= Billy Bryan (baseball) =

American baseball player (1938–2026)

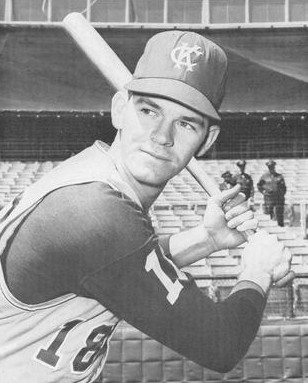
- Bryan in 1965
- Catcher
- Born: December 4, 1938; Morgan, Georgia, U.S.
- Died: April 9, 2026 (aged 87); Opelika, Alabama, U.S.
- Batted: Left Threw: Right

MLB debut
- September 12, 1961, for the Kansas City Athletics

Last MLB appearance
- July 23, 1968, for the Washington Senators

MLB statistics
- Batting average: .216
- Home runs: 41
- Runs batted in: 125
- Stats at Baseball Reference

Teams
- Kansas City Athletics (1961–1966); New York Yankees (1966–1967); Washington Senators (1968)

William Ronald Bryan (December 4, 1938 – April 9, 2026) was an American Major League Baseball catcher who appeared in 374 games over all or portions of eight seasons for the Kansas City Athletics (1961–1966), New York Yankees (1966–1967), and Washington Senators (1968). Born in Morgan, Georgia, Bryan stood 6 feet 4 inches (1.93 m) tall, weighed 200 pounds (91 kg), batted left-handed and threw right-handed.

Bryan was signed by the Athletics in 1960 and enjoyed early success at the minor-league level, making the All-Star team in the 1961 Class B Northwest League and hitting 25 home runs, knocking in 85 runs, and batting .295 in the Double-A Texas League in 1962. While Bryan hit for some power in the majors, especially when he was the regular or semi-regular catcher for the Athletics in 1964–1965, he compiled a batting mark of only .216, with 209 career hits (including 32 doubles, nine triples and 41 homers), 968 at bats, and 283 strikeouts.

He retired in 1970 after 11 pro seasons. Bryan died on April 9, 2026, at the age of 87.
