= Edison Commercial Historic District =

Historic district in Georgia, United States

- U.S. National Register of Historic Places
- U.S. Historic district
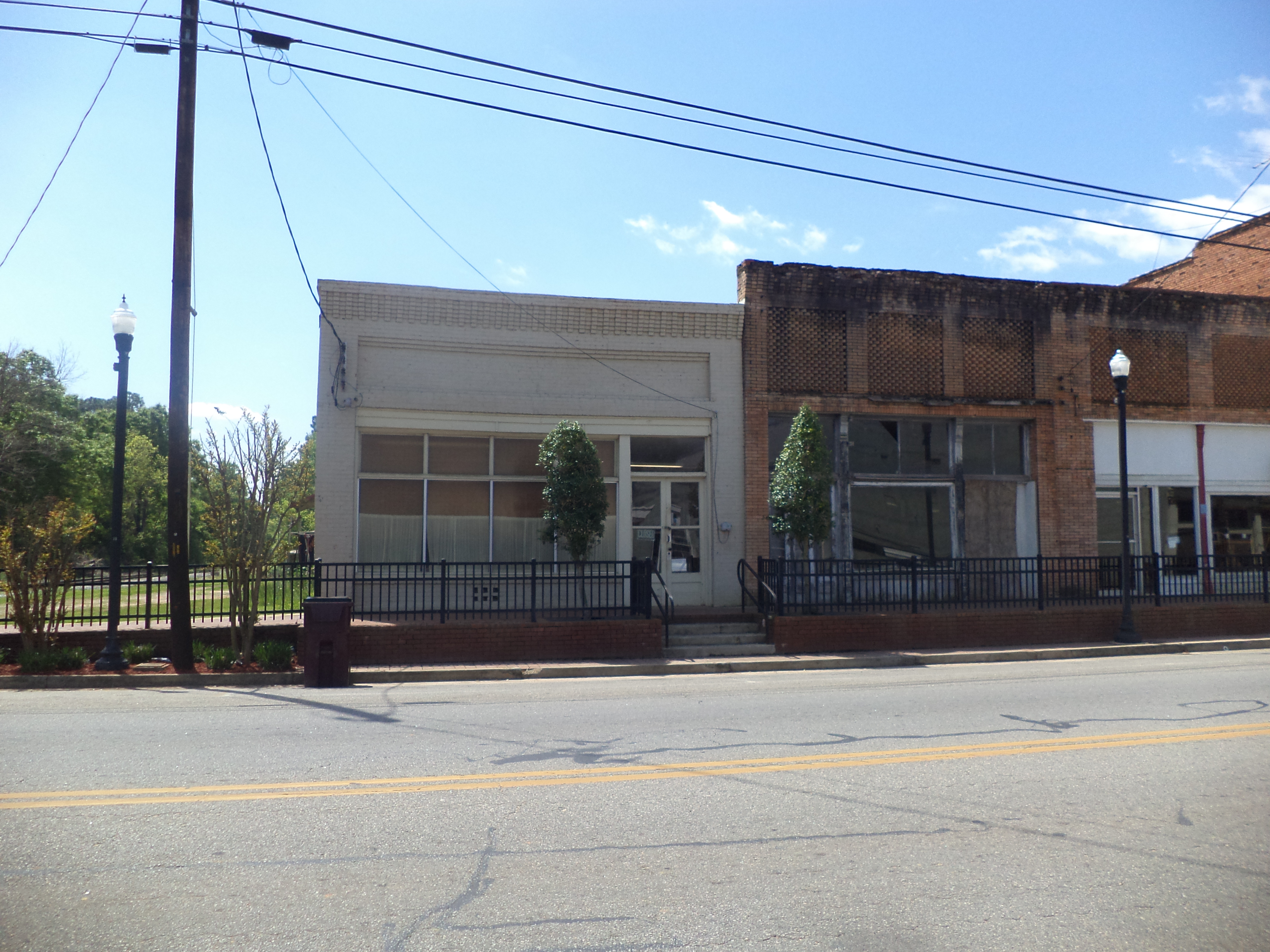

- Location within Georgia Location within the United States
- Location: Hartford St./GA 37 and Turner St./GA216, Edison, Georgia
- Coordinates: 31°33′28″N 84°44′26″W
- Area: 5 acres (2.0 ha)
- Built: 1902
- NRHP reference No.: 00000528
- Added to NRHP: May 26, 2000

The Edison Commercial Historic District is a 5-acre (2.0 ha) historic district in Edison, Georgia, United States that was listed on the National Register of Historic Places in 2000. It included 22 contributing buildings and a contributing structure, plus three buildings not deemed to contribute to the historic character of the district.

Most of the buildings are brick commercial buildings, and either one- or two-story. The majority front on Hartford Street, the main east–west street through the town.

Selected buildings in the district include:

- Farmers Trading Company building (1912)
- Theatre building (1951)
- a former Bank of Edison building built in 1904 which is currently the city hall; this building is deemed non-contributing due to non-historic brick veneer which has been added to its facades.
