= Calhoun County Courthouse (Georgia) =

Coordinates: 31°32′16″N 84°35′59″W

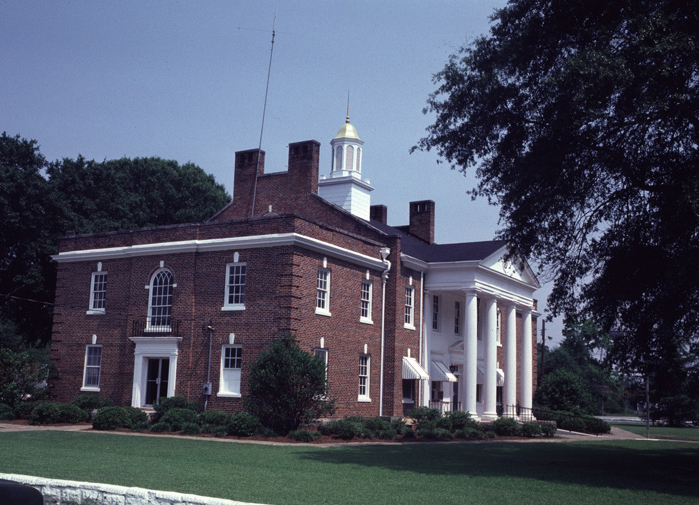

General information
- Location: Morgan, Georgia

The Calhoun County Courthouse in Morgan, Georgia, is located on the town's public square.

It was built in 1930. It was designed in Colonial Revival style by T. Firth Lockwood, Jr.
