= Dille-Probst House =

Historic house in Indiana, United States

- U.S. National Register of Historic Places
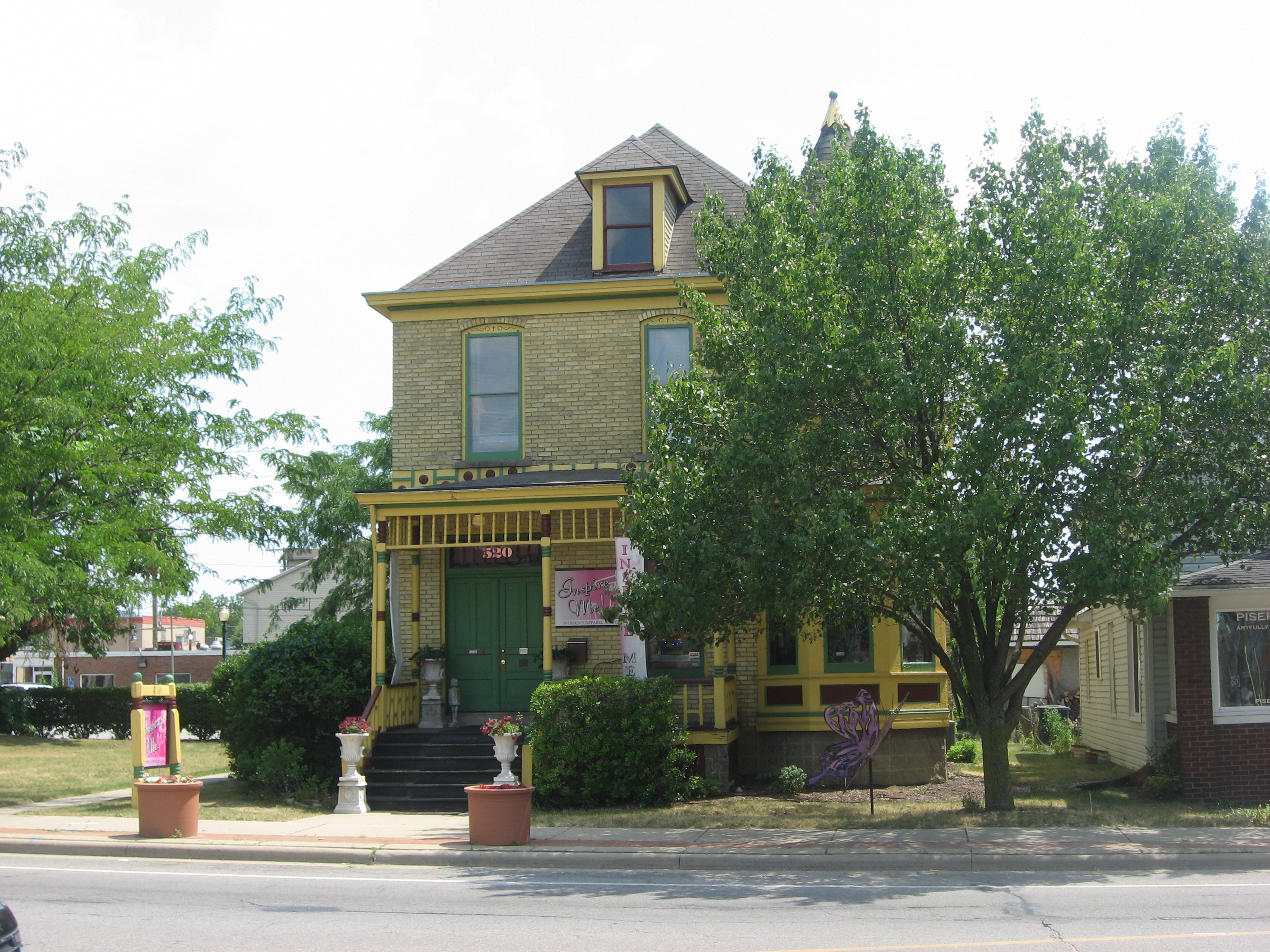
- Dille-Probst House, July 2012

- Location within Indiana Location within the United States
- Location: 520 E. Colfax Ave., South Bend, Indiana
- Coordinates: 41°40′39″N 86°14′36″W
- Area: less than one acre
- Built: 1888
- Architectural style: Queen Anne
- NRHP reference No.: 94000224
- Added to NRHP: March 17, 1994

Dille-Probst House, also known as the Colonel Otto Probst House, is a historic home located at South Bend, Indiana. It was built in 1888, and is a 2 1/2-story, "T"-plan, Queen Anne style frame dwelling with a brick veneer. It has a steeply pitched hipped roof and features a polygonal tower and Eastlake movement style front porch.

It was listed on the National Register of Historic Places in 1994.
