= Richard E. Dill House =

Historic house in Nebraska, United States

- U.S. National Register of Historic Places
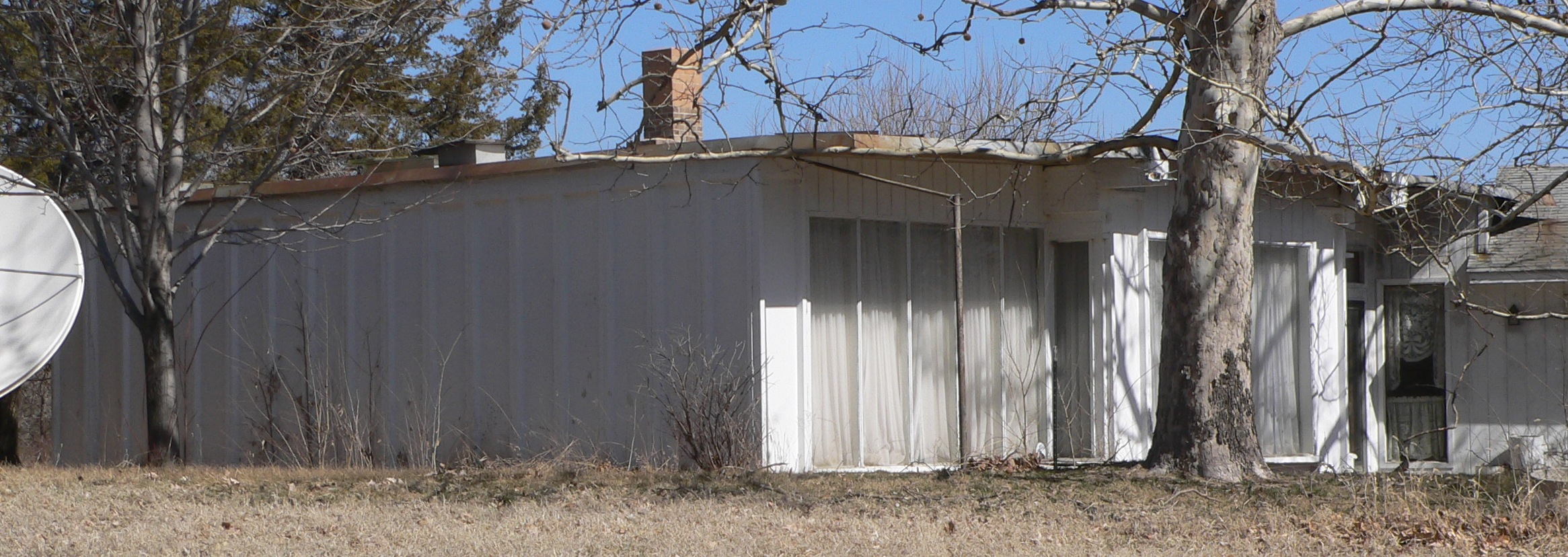

- Location within Nebraska Location within the United States
- Location: Off SR 76, Alexandria, Nebraska
- Coordinates: 40°14′53″N 97°23′18″W
- Area: 0.3 acres (0.12 ha)
- Built: 1936
- Architect: Dill, Richard E.
- Architectural style: Modern Movement
- NRHP reference No.: 73001077
- Added to NRHP: January 29, 1973

The Richard E. Dill House, off SR 53 (formerly SR 76) in Alexandria, Nebraska, is a Modern Movement house built in 1936. It was designed by self-trained engineer and architect Richard E. Dill. It was listed on the National Register of Historic Places in 1973. The house is the first successful application of "concrete modular construction" in a residence, in particular the first use of "Prestressed channel plank modules" patented by Dill.
