= Dill Farm =

- U.S. National Register of Historic Places
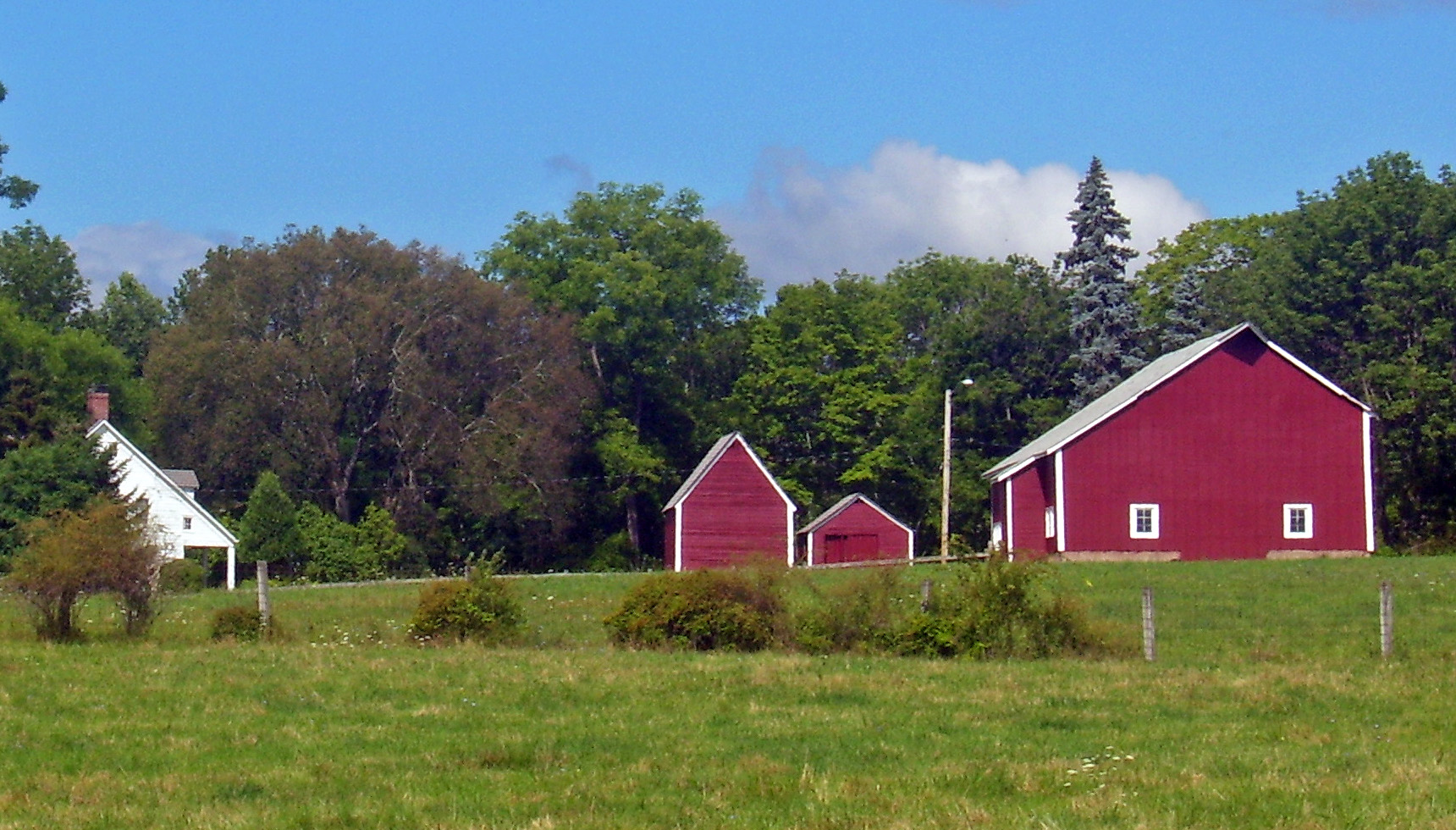
- Farm from northeast in 2008. House is at left.
- Location: Shawangunk, New York
- Nearest city: Middletown
- Coordinates: 41°38′36″N 74°15′41″W
- Area: 24 acres (9.7 ha)
- Built: c. 1760
- Architectural style: Greek Revival
- MPS: Shawangunk Valley MRA
- NRHP reference No.: 83001816
- Added to NRHP: September 26, 1983

Dill Farm is a farm located off Steen Road in Shawangunk, New York, United States, established by the Dill family in the 1760s and still in use today.

The farmhouse is an early surviving example of a vernacular frame house in the region. It and all accessory buildings date to the early 19th century and are mostly intact, save for a few modifications. The farm was added to the National Register of Historic Places in 1983.

== Property ==
The farm is a 24-acre (9.7 ha) square parcel on the south side of Steen (formerly Goebel) Road where it bends from north–south to east–west. The Dwaar Kill, a tributary of the Wallkill River, bounds the property to the east. To the south is the Watchtower Farms complex operated by the Jehovah's Witnesses. There are six buildings in total on the property, all of which are considered contributing resources to its historic character.

The main buildings are at the end of a private entrance road, which starts at the bend in Steen and turns around in the center of the property. At its end is the main farmhouse, a one-and-half story frame house with a steep roof pierced by three gabled dormers sloping to a front porch supported by six wooden columns. The north and south ends have exposed stone on the first story. A smaller south wing is similarly treated, and a southeastern kitchen wing has a Dutch door, stone foundation, plain frieze at the gabled roofline, and pilasters.

Nearby are three farm buildings, all painted red: a frame ice house with gabled roof, similar frame milk house and a large dairy barn. Along the driveway is a 1 1/2-story tenant house, with its own gabled roof and plain-friezed roofline supported by pilasters. A porch covers the front. The tenant house has its own barn in the rear as well.

== History ==
The Dill name is in records from the lower Shawangunk Kill valley from the early 18th century. The earliest occupant of the farm appears to have been Robert Dill, who the 1790 census records as living there with his family and two slaves.

The early house survives in the present living room and hallway. In 1800 an addition to the south brought it into something closer to its present form. The only significant change since then has been the addition of the dormers in 1935. A few years later, the barn roof was raised as well.
