= Calhoun County High School (Edison, Georgia) =

Calhoun County K-12 School
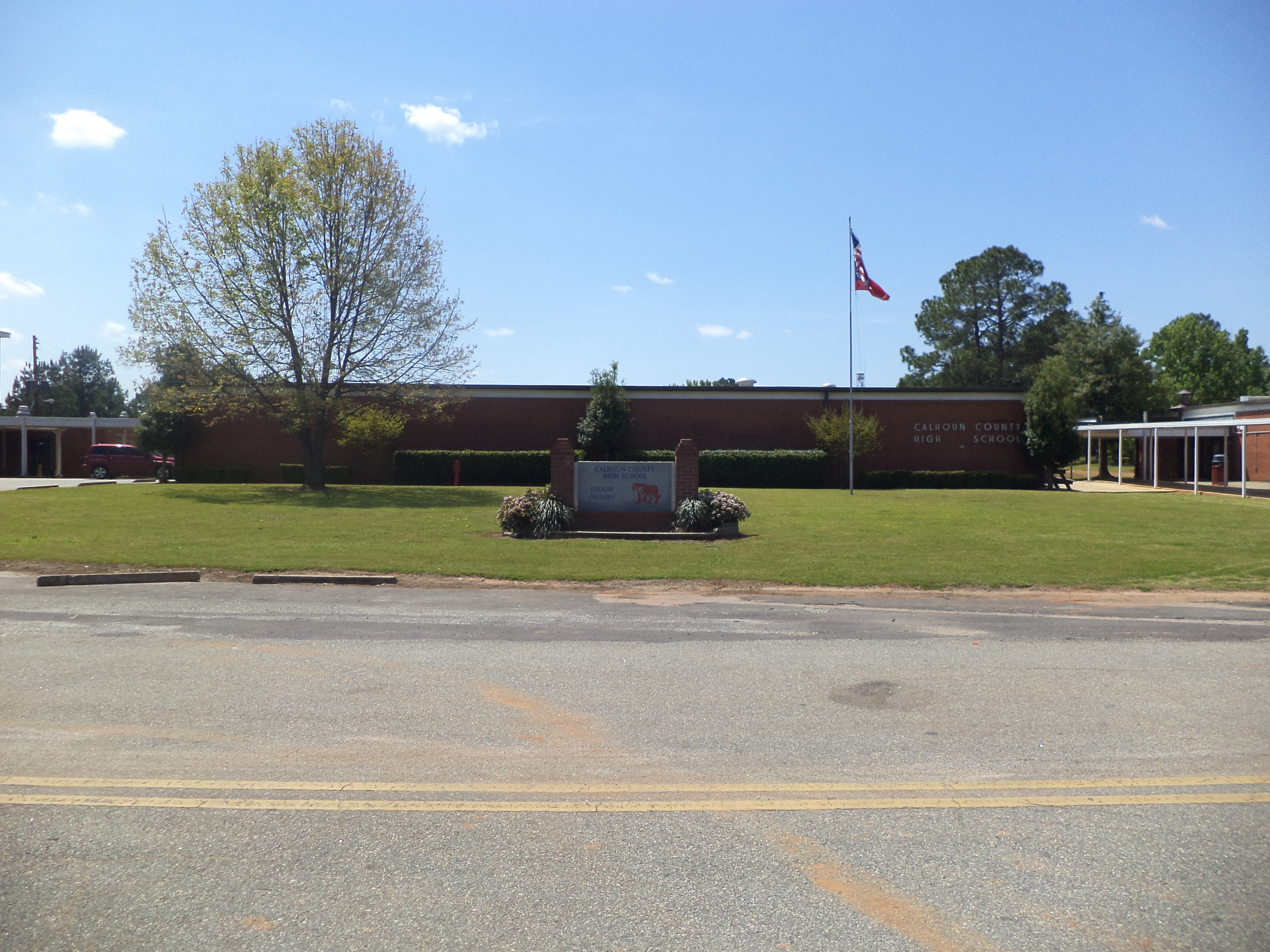

Location
- 133 Cougar Lane; Edison, Georgia 39846; United States
- Coordinates: 31°33′50″N 84°43′40″W

Information
- School district: Calhoun County School District
- CEEB code: 111193
- Principal: Tonya Robinson
- Teaching staff: 12.30 (FTE)
- Grades: PK3-12
- Enrollment: 146 (as of 2024-2025)
- Student to teacher ratio: 11.87
- Colors: Red and blue
- Athletics: GHSA Class A
- Mascot: Cougar
- Website: cchs.calhoun.k12.ga.us

Calhoun County High School is a secondary school in Edison, Georgia, United States.

== History ==
In late 1994, former Calhoun County High School teacher Corkin Cherubini made national headlines when, as district superintendent, he ended district practices the Department of Education's Office of Civil Rights found to be racially biased, including tracking and segregated cheerleading squads.

== Extracurricular activities ==
The school's sports teams, known as the Calhoun County Cougars, compete in GHSA Class A Region 1, Sub-Region A. Teams are fielded in baseball, basketball, cheerleading, football, softball, and track.
