= Clay County Courthouse (Georgia) =

- U.S. National Register of Historic Places
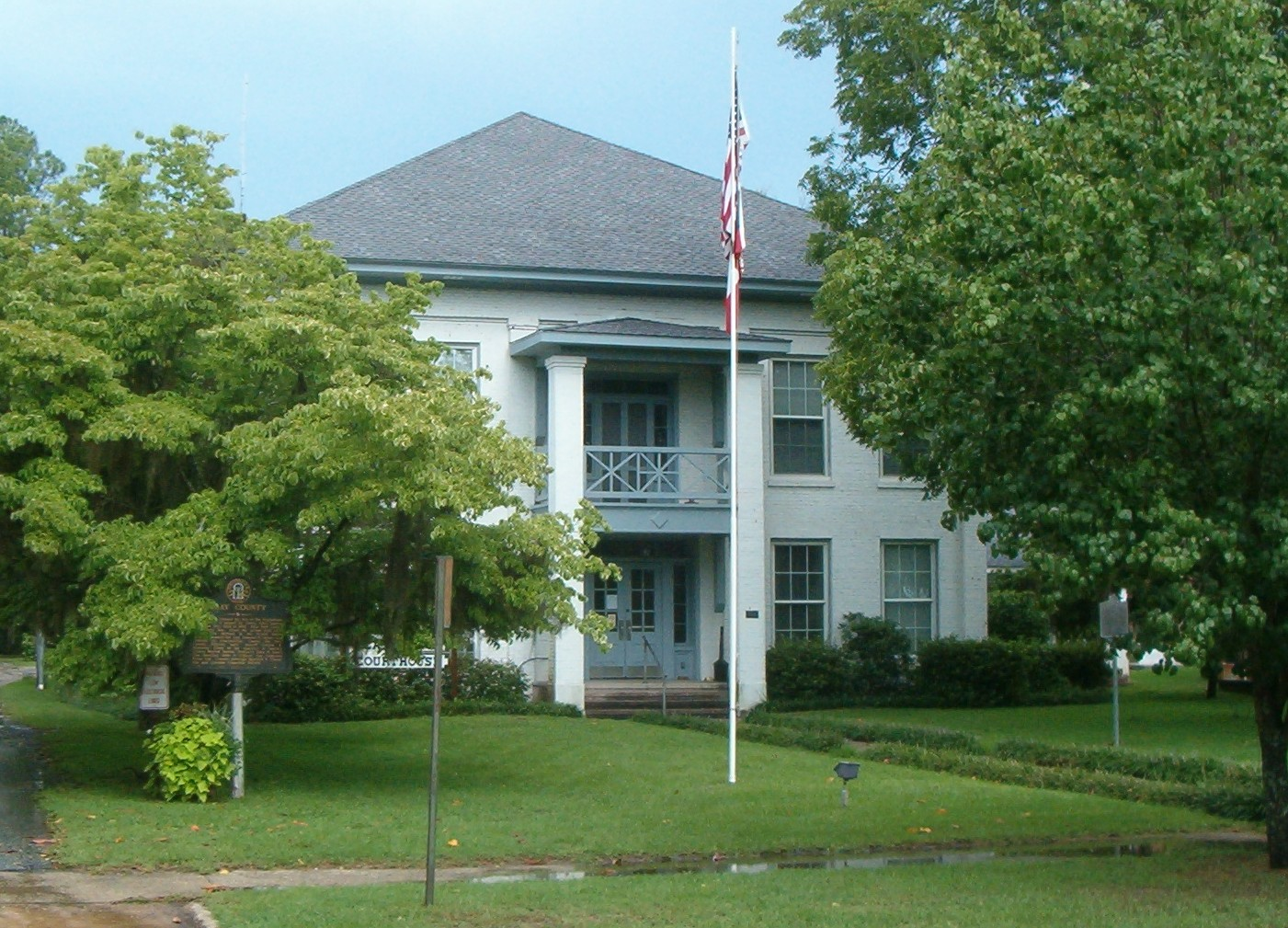

- Location within Georgia Location within the United States
- Location: Off GA 37, Fort Gaines, Georgia
- Coordinates: 31.604198°N 85.048419°W
- Area: 1 acre (0.40 ha)
- Built: 1871
- Architectural style: Carpenter
- MPS: Georgia County Courthouses TR
- NRHP reference No.: 80000992
- Added to NRHP: September 18, 1980

The Clay County Courthouse in Fort Gaines, Georgia was built in about 1871. It is a two-story brick building that "looks more like an antebellum plantation house than a courthouse." It was listed on the National Register of Historic Places in 1980.

It is described as "Carpenter style with Classic details". It is a two-story hipped-roof building. It has a portico with square columns and a balcony on the second floor, and it has colossal pilasters on each end of its facade.
