= Information Technology Authority =

Omani government IT authority

Coordinates: 23°34′3.33″N 58°10′12.6″E

Sultanate of Oman Information Technology Authority (ITA)
- هيئة تقنية المعلومات

Agency overview
- Headquarters: Muscat (Oman)
- Agency executives: Ali Al Sunaidy, Chairman; Ahmed Al Dheeb, Deputy Chairman; Salim Al Ruzaiqi, CEO
- Website: http://www.ita.gov.om

Information Technology Authority (ITA) was a governmental authority in Oman that was responsible for establishing and running the e-governance services in Oman.

The authority was replaced in October 2019 by the Ministry of Transport, Communications and Information Technology (Oman).
