= Clay County, Georgia =

County in Georgia, United States

- County
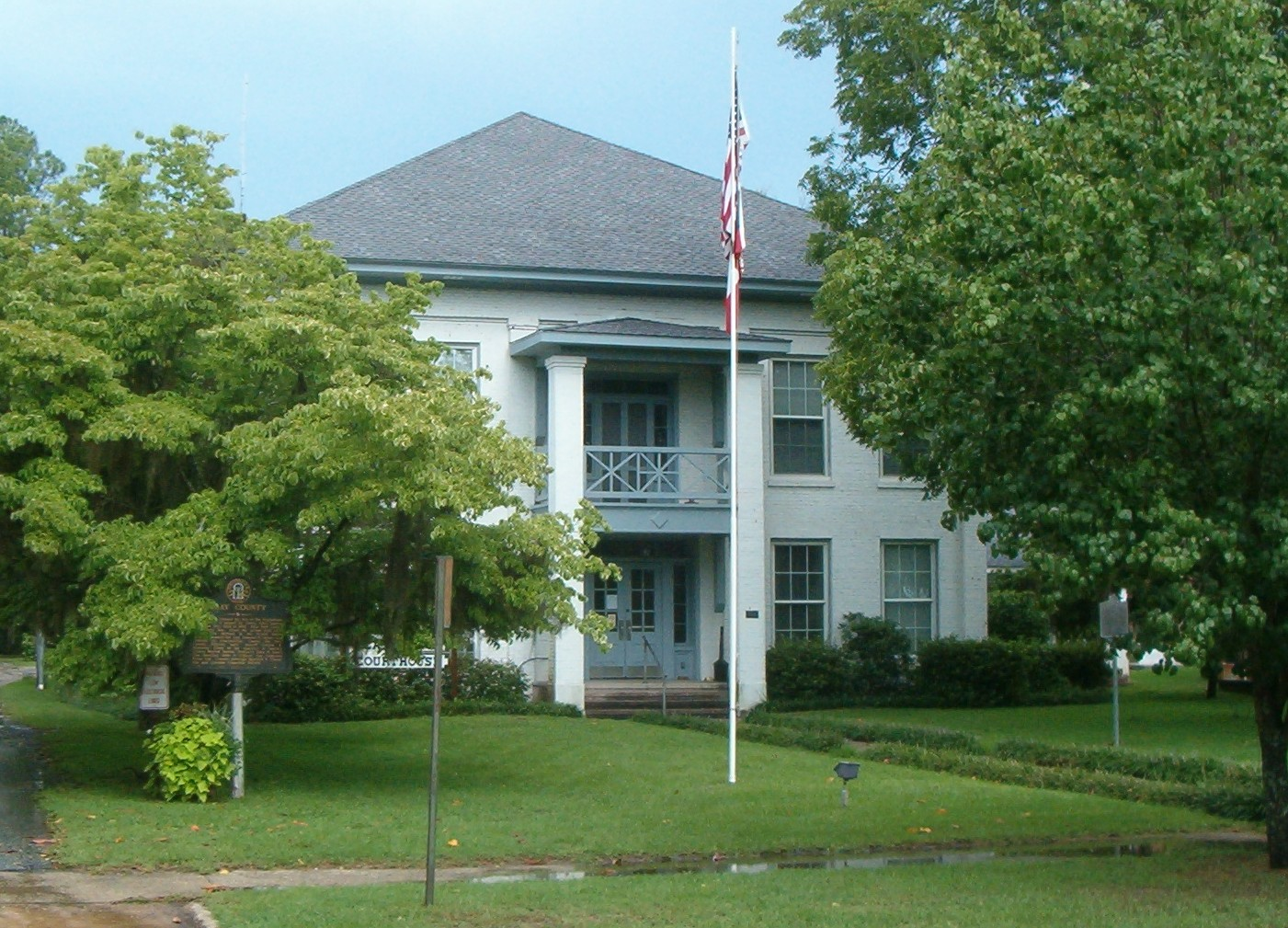
- Clay County Courthouse in Fort Gaines

- Seal

- Location within the U.S. state of Georgia
- Coordinates: 31°37′N 84°59′W
- Country: United States
- State: Georgia
- Founded: 1854; 172 years ago
- Named for: Henry Clay
- Seat: Fort Gaines
- Largest city: Fort Gaines

Area
  - Total: 217 sq mi (560 km^{2})
  - Land: 195 sq mi (510 km^{2})
  - Water: 22 sq mi (57 km^{2}) 10.1%

Population (2020)
  - Total: 2,848
  - Estimate (2025): 2,815 ▼
  - Density: 14.6/sq mi (5.64/km^{2})
- Time zone: UTC−5 (Eastern)
  - Summer (DST): UTC−4 (EDT)
- Congressional district: 2nd
- Website: www.claycountyga.net

Clay County is a county located in the southwestern part of the U.S. state of Georgia. As of the 2020 United States census, the population was 2,848, making it the third-least populous county in Georgia. The county seat is Fort Gaines.

== History ==
This area was historically occupied by the Creek Indians until Indian Removal in the 1830s. European Americans pushed them out and developed the land for cotton, bringing in thousands of African slaves to work the land.

The county is named in honor of Henry Clay, famous American statesman, member of the United States Senate from Kentucky and United States Secretary of State in the 19th century. Part of the Black Belt geological formation of Georgia, prior to the American Civil War the county's chief commodity crop was cotton, cultivated and processed by farmers and African-American slaves. After the war, the economy continued to be agricultural, but timber was also harvested.

Clay was created by a February 16, 1854, act of the Georgia General Assembly, and organized from portions of Early and Randolph counties.

Clay County's population is one-third of what it was in 1910.

== Geography ==
According to the U.S. Census Bureau, the county has a total area of 217 square miles (560 km^{2}), of which 195 square miles (510 km^{2}) is land and 22 square miles (57 km^{2}) (10.1%) is water.

The central and southwestern portions of Clay County, from west of Bluffton to northwest of Coleman, are located in the Lower Chattahoochee River sub-basin of the ACF River Basin (Apalachicola-Chattahoochee-Flint River Basin). The county's northwestern corner, which is bisected by State Route 39 running north from Fort Gaines, is located in the Middle Chattahoochee River-Walter F. George Lake sub-basin of the same ACF River Basin. Just the very southeastern corner of Clay County is located in the Spring Creek sub-basin of the same larger ACF River Basin.

=== Major highways ===
- U.S. Route 27 / State Route 1
- State Route 37
- State Route 39
- State Route 266

=== Adjacent counties ===
- Quitman County - north
- Randolph County - northeast
- Calhoun County - east
- Early County - south
- Henry County, Alabama - west
- Barbour County, Alabama - northwest

== Demographics ==
Historical population
Census	Pop.	Note	%±
1860	4,893		—
1870	5,493		12.3%
1880	6,650		21.1%
1890	7,817		17.5%
1900	8,568		9.6%
1910	8,960		4.6%
1920	7,557		−15.7%
1930	6,943		−8.1%
1940	7,064		1.7%
1950	5,844		−17.3%
1960	4,551		−22.1%
1970	3,636		−20.1%
1980	3,553		−2.3%
1990	3,364		−5.3%
2000	3,357		−0.2%
2010	3,183		−5.2%
2020	2,848		−10.5%
2025 (est.)	2,815	▼	−1.2%
U.S. Decennial Census; 1790-1880 1890-1910; 1920-1930 1930-1940; 1940-1950 1960-1980; 1980-2000; 2010 2020

=== Historical racial and ethnic composition ===
Clay County, Georgia – Racial and ethnic composition Note: the US Census treats Hispanic/Latino as an ethnic category. This table excludes Latinos from the racial categories and assigns them to a separate category. Hispanics/Latinos may be of any race.
Race / Ethnicity (NH = Non-Hispanic)	Pop 1980	Pop 1990	Pop 2000	Pop 2010	Pop 2020	% 1980	% 1990	% 2000	% 2010	% 2020
White alone (NH)	1,327	1,306	1,282	1,188	1,143	37.35%	38.82%	38.19%	37.32%	40.13%
Black or African American alone (NH)	2,193	2,031	2,009	1,920	1,593	61.72%	60.37%	59.85%	60.32%	55.93%
Native American or Alaska Native alone (NH)	4	5	4	11	1	0.11%	0.15%	0.12%	0.35%	0.04%
Asian alone (NH)	11	3	9	10	6	0.31%	0.09%	0.27%	0.31%	0.21%
Native Hawaiian or Pacific Islander alone (NH)	x	x	1	1	0	x	x	0.03%	0.03%	0.00%
Other race alone (NH)	0	0	0	0	7	0.00%	0.00%	0.00%	0.00%	0.25%
Mixed race or Multiracial (NH)	x	x	20	27	57	x	x	0.60%	0.85%	2.00%
Hispanic or Latino (any race)	18	19	32	26	41	0.51%	0.56%	0.95%	0.82%	1.44%
Total	3,553	3,364	3,357	3,183	2,848	100.00%	100.00%	100.00%	100.00%	100.00%

=== 2020 census ===
As of the 2020 census, there were 2,848 people, 1,250 households, and 708 families residing in the county. Of the residents, 21.1% were under the age of 18 and 25.9% were 65 years of age or older; the median age was 47.1 years. For every 100 females there were 94.0 males, and for every 100 females age 18 and over there were 88.9 males. 0.0% of residents lived in urban areas and 100.0% lived in rural areas.

The racial makeup of the county was 40.4% White, 56.1% Black or African American, 0.0% American Indian and Alaska Native, 0.2% Asian, 0.0% Native Hawaiian and Pacific Islander, 0.3% from some other race, and 3.0% from two or more races. Hispanic or Latino residents of any race comprised 1.4% of the population.

There were 1,250 households in the county, of which 26.8% had children under the age of 18 living with them and 35.0% had a female householder with no spouse or partner present. About 35.4% of all households were made up of individuals and 16.4% had someone living alone who was 65 years of age or older.

There were 1,961 housing units, of which 36.3% were vacant. Among occupied housing units, 71.2% were owner-occupied and 28.8% were renter-occupied. The homeowner vacancy rate was 2.1% and the rental vacancy rate was 6.7%.

=== 2010 census ===
As of the 2010 United States census, there were 3,183 people, 1,331 households, and 869 families living in the county. The population density was 16.3 inhabitants per square mile (6.3/km^{2}). There were 2,102 housing units at an average density of 10.8 per square mile (4.2/km^{2}). The racial makeup of the county was 60.4% black or African American, 37.6% white, 0.3% Asian, 0.3% American Indian, 0.1% from other races, and 1.2% from two or more races. Those of Hispanic or Latino origin made up 0.8% of the population. In terms of ancestry, and 3.3% were American.

Of the 1,331 households, 27.3% had children under the age of 18 living with them, 37.5% were married couples living together, 22.8% had a female householder with no husband present, 34.7% were non-families, and 31.6% of all households were made up of individuals. The average household size was 2.35 and the average family size was 2.93. The median age was 45.8 years.

The median income for a household in the county was $26,250 and the median income for a family was $31,354. Males had a median income of $29,440 versus $23,816 for females. The per capita income for the county was $13,353. About 25.5% of families and 34.2% of the population were below the poverty line, including 56.7% of those under age 18 and 16.0% of those age 65 or over.

=== 2000 census ===
As of the census of 2000, there were 3,357 people, 1,347 households, and 928 families living in the county. The population density was 17 people per square mile (6.6 people/km^{2}). There were 1,925 housing units at an average density of 10 per square mile (3.9/km^{2}). The racial makeup of the county was 60.47% Black or African American, 38.43% White, 0.12% Native American, 0.27% Asian, 0.06% Pacific Islander, and 0.66% from two or more races. 0.95% of the population were Hispanic or Latino of any race.

There were 1,347 households, out of which 25.70% had children under the age of 18 living with them, 40.70% were married couples living together, 23.40% had a female householder with no husband present, and 31.10% were non-families. 27.80% of all households were made up of individuals, and 13.20% had someone living alone who was 65 years of age or older. The average household size was 2.45 and the average family size was 2.99.

In the county, the population was spread out, with 25.70% under the age of 18, 8.00% from 18 to 24, 21.00% from 25 to 44, 25.70% from 45 to 64, and 19.50% who were 65 years of age or older. The median age was 42 years. For every 100 females there were 83.30 males. For every 100 females age 18 and over, there were 78.50 males.

The median income for a household in the county was $21,448, and the median income for a family was $27,837. Males had a median income of $26,557 versus $17,083 for females. The per capita income for the county was $16,819. About 28.10% of families and 31.30% of the population were below the poverty line, including 43.40% of those under age 18 and 23.90% of those age 65 or over.

== Communities ==
=== Cities ===
- Fort Gaines

=== Towns ===
- Bluffton

=== Unincorporated communities ===
- Pecan
- Suttons Corner
- Zetto

=== Ghost town ===
- Oketeyeconne

== Politics ==
As of the 2020s, Clay County is a Democratic stronghold, voting 53% for Kamala Harris in 2024. Clay County was previously one of the most consistently voting Democratic counties in the country. It voted for the Democratic nominee in every election from 1868 until 1960, and then again since 1976. In the 2022 Georgia state elections, however, Clay County voted for every Republican candidate except Herschel Walker. This has resulted in the county becoming a swing county. In 2024, Donald Trump lost the county by less than 8 points, the closest a Republican presidential candidate has come to carrying the county since Richard Nixon won it in his 1972 landslide.

For elections to the United States House of Representatives, Clay County is part of Georgia's 2nd congressional district, currently represented by Sanford Bishop. For elections to the Georgia State Senate, Clay County is part of District 12. For elections to the Georgia House of Representatives, Clay County is part of District 154.

United States presidential election results for Clay County, Georgia
Year	Republican		Democratic		Third party(ies)	
Year	No.	%	No.	%	No.	%
1912	17	4.31%	369	93.65%	8	2.03%
1916	10	4.10%	225	92.21%	9	3.69%
1920	63	21.50%	230	78.50%	0	0.00%
1924	51	15.41%	246	74.32%	34	10.27%
1928	56	12.15%	405	87.85%	0	0.00%
1932	12	2.68%	433	96.65%	3	0.67%
1936	13	2.61%	484	96.99%	2	0.40%
1940	33	6.31%	488	93.31%	2	0.38%
1944	35	7.34%	442	92.66%	0	0.00%
1948	33	8.99%	295	80.38%	39	10.63%
1952	176	26.79%	481	73.21%	0	0.00%
1956	103	20.89%	390	79.11%	0	0.00%
1960	84	13.73%	528	86.27%	0	0.00%
1964	544	60.04%	360	39.74%	2	0.22%
1968	133	10.57%	517	41.10%	608	48.33%
1972	632	69.07%	283	30.93%	0	0.00%
1976	295	23.75%	947	76.25%	0	0.00%
1980	316	25.46%	909	73.25%	16	1.29%
1984	419	35.84%	750	64.16%	0	0.00%
1988	398	40.04%	595	59.86%	1	0.10%
1992	264	22.06%	778	65.00%	155	12.95%
1996	293	25.63%	787	68.85%	63	5.51%
2000	448	35.08%	821	64.29%	8	0.63%
2004	509	38.85%	798	60.92%	3	0.23%
2008	558	38.75%	879	61.04%	3	0.21%
2012	537	38.28%	862	61.44%	4	0.29%
2016	566	44.46%	697	54.75%	10	0.79%
2020	637	44.36%	791	55.08%	8	0.56%
2024	663	45.98%	771	53.47%	8	0.55%

United States Senate election results for Clay County, Georgia2
Year	Republican		Democratic		Third party(ies)	
Year	No.	%	No.	%	No.	%
2020	647	45.69%	748	52.82%	21	1.48%
2020	583	44.47%	728	55.53%	0	0.00%

United States Senate election results for Clay County, Georgia3
Year	Republican		Democratic		Third party(ies)	
Year	No.	%	No.	%	No.	%
2020	305	21.65%	474	33.64%	630	44.71%
2020	583	44.50%	727	55.50%	0	0.00%
2022	528	47.14%	572	51.07%	20	1.79%
2022	485	47.50%	536	52.50%	0	0.00%

Georgia Gubernatorial election results for Clay County
Year	Republican		Democratic		Third party(ies)	
Year	No.	%	No.	%	No.	%
2022	570	50.62%	553	49.11%	3	0.27%

== See also ==
- National Register of Historic Places listings in Clay County, Georgia
- List of counties in Georgia
