= Morgan, Georgia =

- City
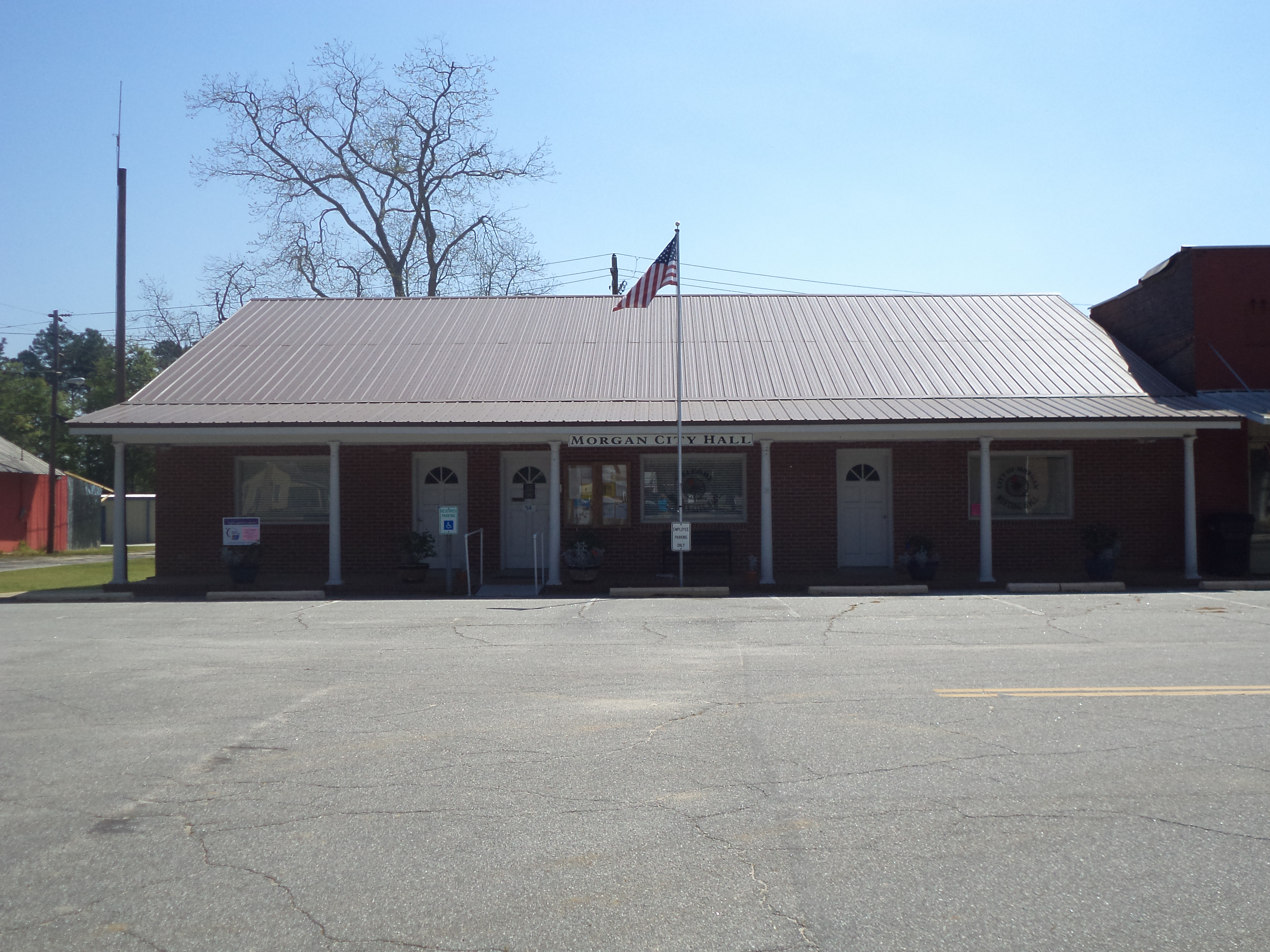
- Morgan City Hall

- Location in Calhoun County and the state of Georgia
- Coordinates: 31°32′20″N 84°36′4″W
- Country: United States
- State: Georgia
- County: Calhoun

Area
  - Total: 1.31 sq mi (3.39 km^{2})
  - Land: 1.31 sq mi (3.39 km^{2})
  - Water: 0 sq mi (0.00 km^{2})
- Elevation: 246 ft (75 m)

Population (2020)
  - Total: 1,741
  - Density: 1,329/sq mi (513.3/km^{2})
- Time zone: UTC-5 (Eastern (EST))
  - Summer (DST): UTC-4 (EDT)
- ZIP codes: 39866
- Area code: 229
- FIPS code: 13-52696
- GNIS feature ID: 0318451

Morgan is a city in Calhoun County, Georgia, United States. The population was 1,741 at the 2020 census. The city is the county seat of Calhoun County.

== History ==
Morgan was founded in 1854 as seat of the newly formed Calhoun County. It was incorporated as a city in 1856. The city was named after Hiram Morgan, a county official.

From 1923 to 1929, Morgan was replaced as county seat by Arlington, Georgia after a referendum. It became county seat again after an additional referendum.

== Geography ==
Morgan is located near the center of Calhoun County at 31°32′20″N 84°36′4″W (31.538877, -84.601034). It is 30 miles (48 km) west of Albany and 26 miles (42 km) northeast of Blakely. According to the United States Census Bureau, Morgan has a total area of 1.3 square miles (3.4 km^{2}), all land.

== Demographics ==
Historical population
Census	Pop.	Note	%±
1860	187		—
1870	126		−32.6%
1880	111		−11.9%
1890	180		62.2%
1900	240		33.3%
1910	302		25.8%
1920	341		12.9%
1930	249		−27.0%
1940	282		13.3%
1950	304		7.8%
1960	293		−3.6%
1970	280		−4.4%
1980	364		30.0%
1990	252		−30.8%
2000	1,464		481.0%
2010	1,861		27.1%
2020	1,741		−6.4%
U.S. Decennial Census; 1850-1870 1870-1880; 1890-1910 1920-1930; 1940 1950 1960; 1970 1980 1990; 2000 2010 2020

=== Racial and ethnic composition ===
Morgan city, Georgia – Racial and ethnic composition Note: the US Census treats Hispanic/Latino as an ethnic category. This table excludes Latinos from the racial categories and assigns them to a separate category. Hispanics/Latinos may be of any race.
Race / Ethnicity (NH = Non-Hispanic)	Pop 2000	Pop 2010	Pop 2020	% 2000	% 2010	% 2020
White alone (NH)	456	x	502	31.15%	x	28.83%
Black or African American alone (NH)	884	x	1,180	60.38%	x	67.78%
Native American or Alaska Native alone (NH)	0	x	0	0.00%	x	0.00%
Asian alone (NH)	0	x	3	0.00%	x	0.17%
Native Hawaiian or Pacific Islander alone (NH)	0	x	0	0.00%	x	0.00%
Other race alone (NH)	0	x	0	0.00%	x	0.00%
Mixed race or Multiracial (NH)	5	x	13	0.34%	x	0.75%
Hispanic or Latino (any race)	119	x	43	8.13%	x	2.47%
Total	1,464	1,861	1,741	100.00%	100.00%	100.00%

=== 2020 census ===
As of the 2020 census, Morgan had a population of 1,741. The median age was 38.2 years. 2.7% of residents were under the age of 18 and 6.5% of residents were 65 years of age or older. For every 100 females there were 1413.9 males, and for every 100 females age 18 and over there were 1825.0 males age 18 and over.

0.0% of residents lived in urban areas, while 100.0% lived in rural areas.

There were 95 households in Morgan, of which 29.5% had children under the age of 18 living in them. Of all households, 35.8% were married-couple households, 20.0% were households with a male householder and no spouse or partner present, and 36.8% were households with a female householder and no spouse or partner present. About 34.7% of all households were made up of individuals and 11.6% had someone living alone who was 65 years of age or older.

There were 110 housing units, of which 13.6% were vacant. The homeowner vacancy rate was 1.4% and the rental vacancy rate was 3.2%.

=== 2000 census ===
As of the census of 2000, there were 1,464 people, 108 households, and 69 families residing in the city.

== Notable people ==
- Billy Bryan, Major League Baseball player
- Tom Cheney, Major League Baseball player
