= Edison, Georgia =

Edison
- City
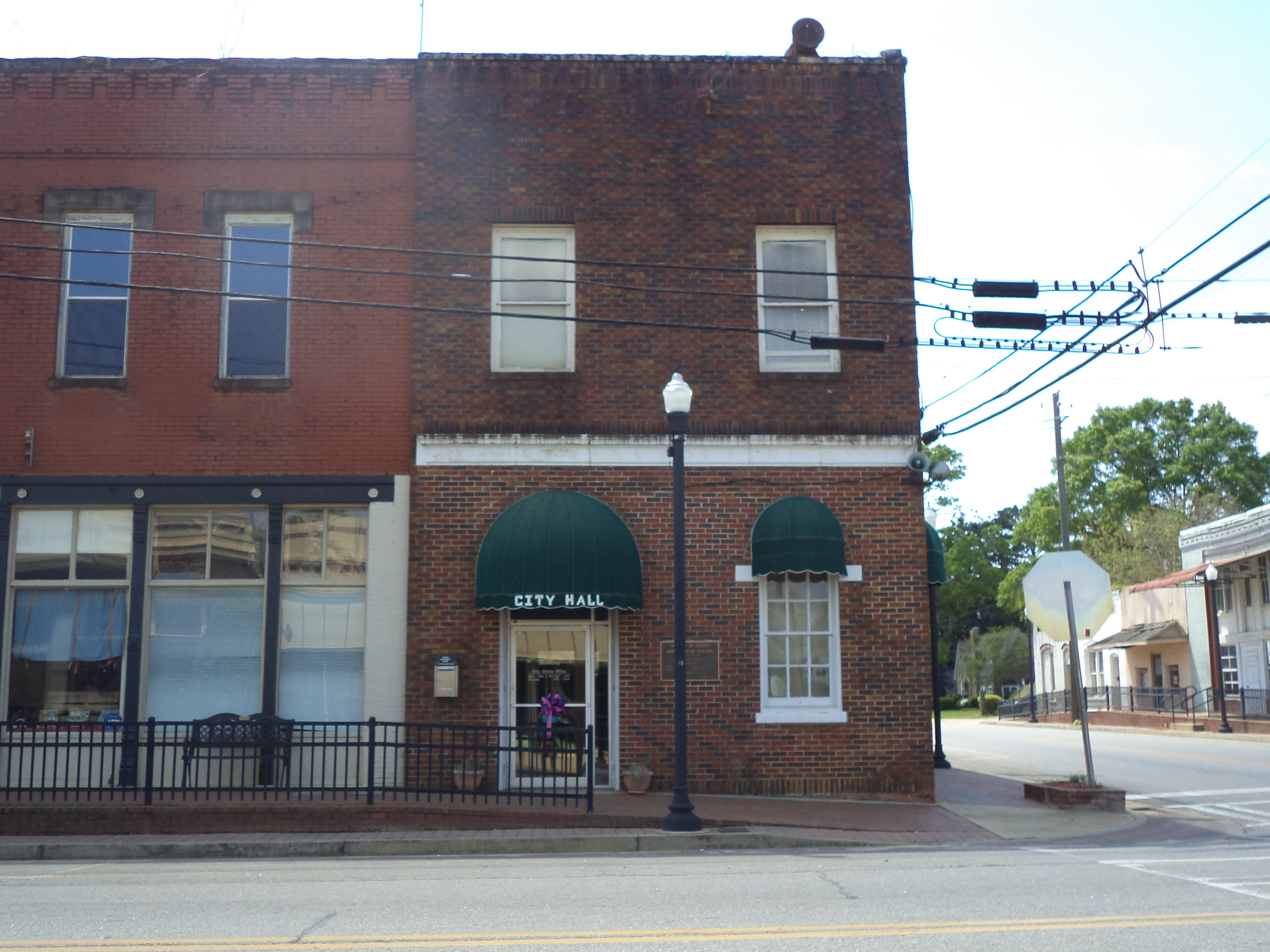
- Edison City Hall

- Seal

- Location in Calhoun County and the state of Georgia
- Coordinates: 31°33′39″N 84°44′17″W
- Country: United States
- State: Georgia
- County: Calhoun

Area
  - Total: 2.34 sq mi (6.06 km^{2})
  - Land: 2.34 sq mi (6.06 km^{2})
  - Water: 0 sq mi (0.00 km^{2})
- Elevation: 292 ft (89 m)

Population (2020)
  - Total: 1,230
  - Density: 525.6/sq mi (202.93/km^{2})
- Time zone: UTC-5 (Eastern (EST))
  - Summer (DST): UTC-4 (EDT)
- ZIP codes: 31746, 39846
- Area code: 229
- FIPS code: 13-26448
- GNIS feature ID: 0355643

Edison is a city in Calhoun County, Georgia, United States. Per the 2020 census, the population was 1,230. The Edison Commercial Historic District is listed on the National Register of Historic Places.

== History ==
The Georgia General Assembly incorporated the place in 1902 as the "Town of Edison". The community was named after Thomas Edison (1847–1931), American inventor.

== Geography ==
Edison is located in northwestern Calhoun County at 31°33′39″N 84°44′17″W (31.560891, -84.737984). It is 40 miles (64 km) west of Albany and 20 miles (32 km) east of the Alabama line at Fort Gaines.

According to the United States Census Bureau, Edison has a total area of 2.4 square miles (6.1 km^{2}), all land.

== Demographics ==
Historical population
Census	Pop.	Note	%±
1910	841		—
1920	885		5.2%
1930	1,321		49.3%
1940	1,241		−6.1%
1950	1,247		0.5%
1960	1,232		−1.2%
1970	1,210		−1.8%
1980	1,128		−6.8%
1990	1,182		4.8%
2000	1,340		13.4%
2010	1,531		14.3%
2020	1,230		−19.7%
U.S. Decennial Census; 1850-1870 1870-1880; 1890-1910 1920-1930; 1940 1950 1960; 1970 1980 1990; 2000 2010 2020

=== Racial and ethnic composition ===
Edison city, Georgia – Racial and ethnic composition Note: the US Census treats Hispanic/Latino as an ethnic category. This table excludes Latinos from the racial categories and assigns them to a separate category. Hispanics/Latinos may be of any race.
Race / Ethnicity (NH = Non-Hispanic)	Pop 2000	Pop 2010	Pop 2020	% 2000	% 2010	% 2020
White alone (NH)	418	459	266	31.19%	29.98%	21.63%
Black or African American alone (NH)	900	975	894	67.16%	63.68%	72.68%
Native American or Alaska Native alone (NH)	0	1	0	0.00%	0.07%	0.00%
Asian alone (NH)	0	16	4	0.00%	1.05%	0.33%
Native Hawaiian or Pacific Islander alone (NH)	0	0	0	0.00%	0.00%	0.00%
Other race alone (NH)	0	0	0	0.00%	0.00%	0.00%
Mixed race or Multiracial (NH)	5	14	17	0.37%	0.91%	1.38%
Hispanic or Latino (any race)	17	66	49	1.27%	4.31%	3.98%
Total	1,340	1,531	1,230	100.00%	100.00%	100.00%

=== 2020 census ===
As of the 2020 census, Edison had a population of 1,230. The median age was 39.8 years. 25.8% of residents were under the age of 18 and 20.1% of residents were 65 years of age or older. For every 100 females there were 75.7 males, and for every 100 females age 18 and over there were 67.2 males age 18 and over.

0.0% of residents lived in urban areas, while 100.0% lived in rural areas.

There were 490 households in Edison, of which 34.5% had children under the age of 18 living in them. Of all households, 25.7% were married-couple households, 16.1% were households with a male householder and no spouse or partner present, and 53.3% were households with a female householder and no spouse or partner present. About 34.5% of all households were made up of individuals and 17.6% had someone living alone who was 65 years of age or older.

There were 567 housing units, of which 13.6% were vacant. The homeowner vacancy rate was 0.0% and the rental vacancy rate was 4.7%.

=== 2000 census ===
As of the 2000 census, there were 1,340 people, 512 households, and 334 families residing in the city.

== Education ==
The Calhoun County School System includes Calhoun County High School-Middle School, which serves Calhoun County and some students from the cities of Arlington, Edison, Leary, and Morgan. Calhoun County Elementary School is in Arlington.

== Notable persons ==
- Bobby Dews, former infielder and former coach in Major League Baseball
- Rodney Dent retired NBA player for the Orlando Magic
- Luke Bryan singer raised in Edison
- Makayla Timpson WNBA player for Indiana Fever
- Corliss Palmer, silent film actress and model, born in Edison
