= Fort Gaines, Georgia =

- City
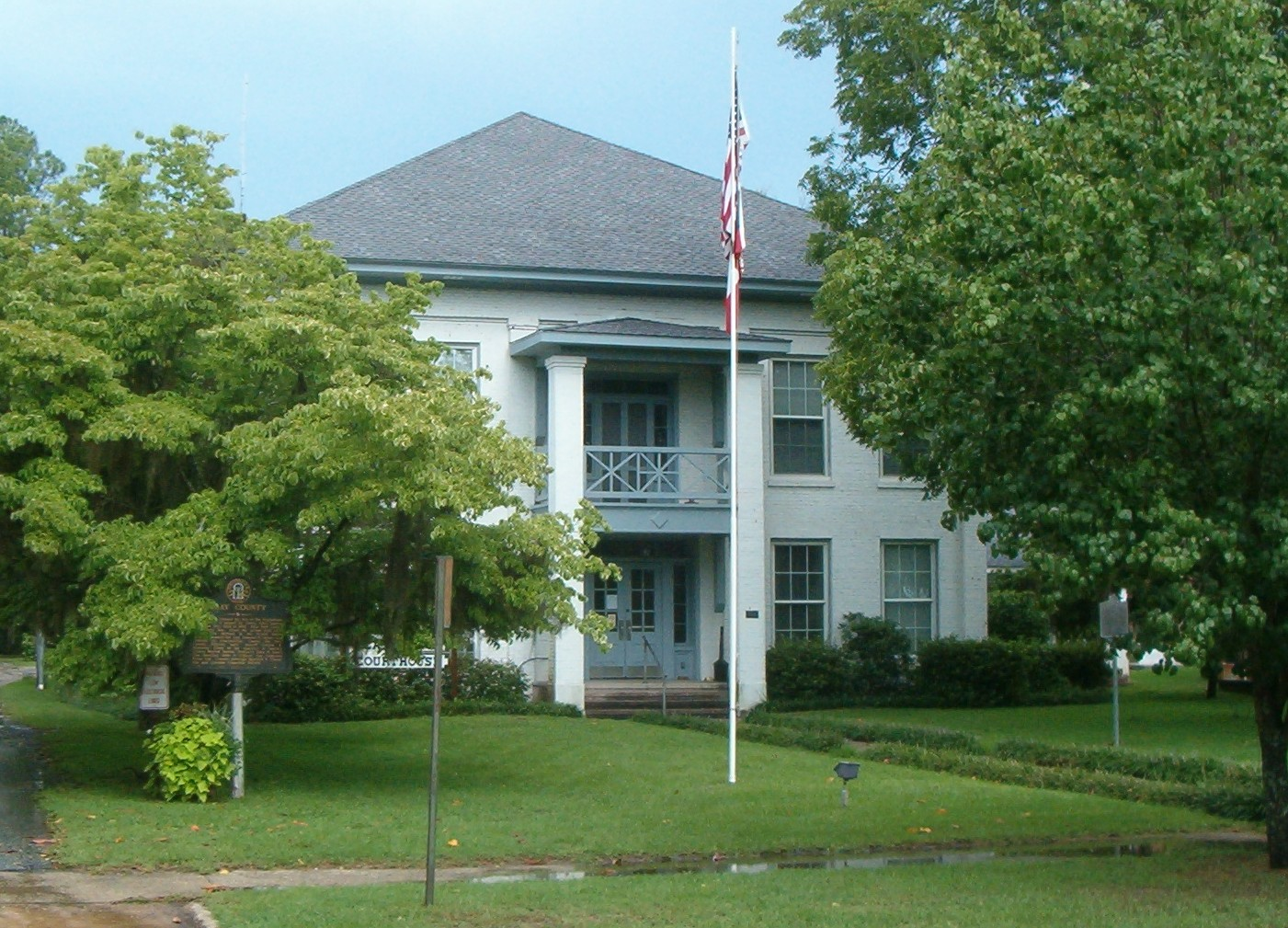
- Clay County Courthouse in Fort Gaines
- Motto: "A historic past - A promising future"
- Location in Clay County and the state of Georgia
- Coordinates: 31°36′51″N 85°2′54″W
- Country: United States
- State: Georgia
- County: Clay

Area
  - Total: 7.70 sq mi (19.94 km^{2})
  - Land: 4.78 sq mi (12.37 km^{2})
  - Water: 2.93 sq mi (7.58 km^{2})
- Elevation: 226 ft (69 m)

Population (2020)
  - Total: 995
  - Density: 208.4/sq mi (80.45/km^{2})
- Time zone: UTC-5 (Eastern (EST))
  - Summer (DST): UTC-4 (EDT)
- ZIP codes: 39851
- Area code: 229
- FIPS code: 13-30816
- GNIS feature ID: 0355877
- Website: www.fortgainesga.org

Fort Gaines is a city in and the county seat of Clay County, Georgia, United States. It has a population of 995 as of the 2020 census.

== History ==
The present town of Fort Gaines was founded in 1816 as protection against the indigenous Creeks and prospered due to riverboat trade. Though it was named for General Edmund Pendleton Gaines, he did not arrive there with the 4th Infantry of the United States Army until 1816. A fort of the same name had been built in 1814 nearby on the Chattachoochee River. In 1854, Fort Gaines was designated seat of the newly formed Clay County.

According to The Floridian newspaper of 1840, in Fort Gaines were the Chattahoochee Female College and the Independent College for Young Men, boarding schools (not colleges, as that word is traditionally used today). "The writer esteems that the society and location of Fort Gaines for literary purposes, so far as the education of youths is concerned, equal to that of Sparta [Georgia]."

== Geography ==
Fort Gaines is located along the western edge of Clay County at 31°36′51″N 85°2′54″W (31.614226, -85.048317). Its western boundary is the Chattahoochee River, which is also the state line with Alabama. Walter F. George Lock and Dam crosses the river between the northern side of Fort Gaines and Alabama, forming Walter F. George Lake, also known as Lake Eufaula.

Georgia State Routes 37, 39, and 266 all run through the city. GA-37 runs east–west just south of the downtown area, leading east 20 mi (32 km) to Edison and west 14 mi (23 km) to Abbeville, Alabama (as Alabama State Route 10). GA-39 runs north–south through the center of town as Hancock Street, leading north 23 mi (37 km) to Georgetown and southeast 20 mi (32 km) to Blakely. GA-266 begins just north of the city and leads northeast 22 mi (35 km) to Cuthbert.

According to the United States Census Bureau, Fort Gaines has a total area of 7.7 square miles (19.9 km^{2}), of which 4.8 square miles (12.4 km^{2}) is land and 2.9 square miles (7.6 km^{2}), or 37.99%, is water.

== Demographics ==
Historical population
Census	Pop.	Note	%±
1870	758		—
1880	867		14.4%
1890	1,097		26.5%
1900	1,305		19.0%
1910	1,320		1.1%
1920	1,237		−6.3%
1930	1,272		2.8%
1940	1,357		6.7%
1950	1,339		−1.3%
1960	1,320		−1.4%
1970	1,255		−4.9%
1980	1,260		0.4%
1990	1,248		−1.0%
2000	1,110		−11.1%
2010	1,107		−0.3%
2020	995		−10.1%
U.S. Decennial Census; 1850-1870 1870-1880; 1890-1910 1920-1930; 1940 1950 1960; 1970 1980 1990; 2000 2010

=== Racial and ethnic composition ===
Fort Gaines city, Georgia – Racial and ethnic composition Note: the US Census treats Hispanic/Latino as an ethnic category. This table excludes Latinos from the racial categories and assigns them to a separate category. Hispanics/Latinos may be of any race.
Race / Ethnicity (NH = Non-Hispanic)	Pop 2000	Pop 2010	Pop 2020	% 2000	% 2010	% 2020
White alone (NH)	341	267	196	30.72%	24.12%	19.70%
Black or African American alone (NH)	742	823	751	66.85%	74.35%	75.48%
Native American or Alaska Native alone (NH)	2	0	1	0.18%	0.00%	0.10%
Asian alone (NH)	2	1	5	0.18%	0.09%	0.50%
Native Hawaiian or Pacific Islander alone (NH)	1	0	0	0.09%	0.00%	0.00%
Other race alone (NH)	0	0	4	0.00%	0.00%	0.40%
Mixed race or Multiracial (NH)	6	13	27	0.54%	1.17%	2.71%
Hispanic or Latino (any race)	16	3	11	1.44%	0.27%	1.11%
Total	1,110	1,107	995	100.00%	100.00%	100.00%

=== 2020 census ===
As of the 2020 United States census, there were 995 people, 336 households, and 212 families residing in the city.

=== 2000 census ===
At the 2000 census, there were 1,110 people, 429 households and 287 families residing in the city. The population density was 231.6 inhabitants per square mile (89.4/km^{2}). There were 519 housing units at an average density of 108.3 per square mile (41.8/km^{2}). The racial makeup of the city was 67.93% African American, 31.08% White, 0.18% Native American, 0.18% Asian, 0.09% Pacific Islander, and 0.54% from two or more races. Hispanic or Latino of any race were 1.44% of the population.

There were 429 households, of which 28.2% had children under the age of 18 living with them, 31.2% were married couples living together, 31.9% had a female householder with no husband present, and 33.1% were non-families. 31.0% of all households were made up of individuals, and 14.9% had someone living alone who was 65 years of age or older. The average household size was 2.45 and the average family size was 3.07.

Age distribution was 28.7% under the age of 18, 8.7% from 18 to 24, 21.0% from 25 to 44, 19.5% from 45 to 64, and 22.0% who were 65 years of age or older. The median age was 39 years. For every 100 females, there were 72.4 males. For every 100 females age 18 and over, there were 65.8 males.

The median household income was $18,30, and the median family income was $20,909. Males had a median income of $20,417 versus $14,875 for females. The per capita income for the city was $12,481. About 34.7% of families and 40.5% of the population were below the poverty line, including 53.2% of those under age 18 and 26.7% of those age 65 or over.

== Education ==
=== Clay County School District ===
The Clay County School District holds pre-school to grade nine, and consists of one elementary school, one middle school, and one ninth-grade education building. The district has 27 full-time teachers and over 358 students. High school aged students attend 10-12th grade in adjoining Randolph County, Georgia.

- Clay County Elementary School
- Clay County Middle School
- Ninth-Grade Academy

== Notable people ==
- Frances Sage Bradley, rural physician
- Mackey Sasser, baseball player
- Charles Driebe, music artist manager, known for managing Blind Boys of Alabama
