= Georgia State Route 111 =

State highway in Georgia, United States

State Route 111
- SR 111 highlighted in red

Route information
- Maintained by GDOT
- Length: 54.76 mi (88.13 km)

Major junctions
- South end: Darsey Calvary Road at the Florida state line southwest of Calvary
- US 84 / SR 38 / SR 93 / SR 188 in Cairo; US 19 / SR 3 / SR 300 / SR 3 Alternate in Meigs; SR 202 southwest of Riverside
- North end: US 319 Bus. / SR 33 in Moultrie

Location
- Country: United States
- State: Georgia
- Counties: Grady, Thomas, Mitchell, Colquitt

Highway system
- Georgia State Highway System; Interstate; US; State; Special
← SR 110	→ SR 112

State Route 111 (SR 111) is a state highway in the southwest part of the U.S. state of Georgia. The highway runs 54.76 miles (88.13 km) from the Florida state line, southwest of Calvary northeast through Cairo and Meigs, glancing off the northwest corner of Riverside, and ending in Moultrie.

== Route description ==
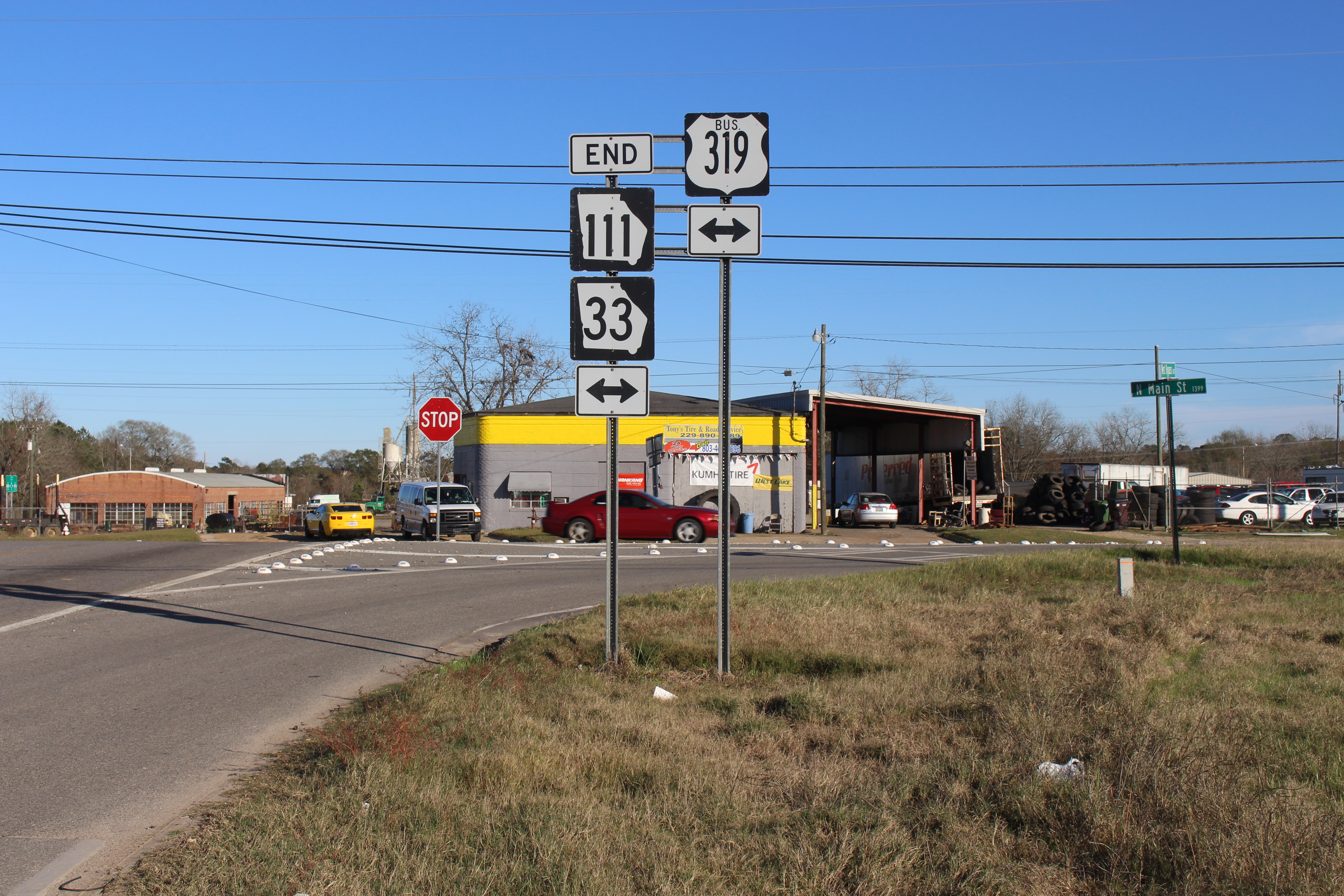
Northern terminus in Moultrie

SR 111 begins as Darsey Calvary Road in Florida, before transitioning to SR-111 in Georgia. It intersects with SR 93 in Cairo. There, the two routes form a concurrency to the north. Farther north, there are intersections with SR 38 Spur and US 84/SR 38. The two routes head north out of Cairo, and then turn northeast. There, the routes diverge with SR 111 heading toward Meigs. In Meigs, SR 111 intersects SR 3 ALT, and the two routes have a short concurrency northeast to US 19/SR 3/SR 300. Upon leaving Meigs, the route briefly runs along the Thomas-Mitchell county line. SR 11 crosses the southeast corner of Mitchell County, before entering Colquitt County. The route travels through rural parts of Colquitt County before entering Moultrie, where it intersects SR 37. The two routes form a brief concurrency that runs along the Moultrie-Riverside city line. Along this line, the two routes diverge. SR 111 arcs around the northern part of Moultrie before meeting its northern terminus, at an intersection with US 319 BUS/SR 33.

== Major intersections ==
County	Location	mi	km	Destinations	Notes
Grady		0.000	0.000	Darsey–Calvary Road – Havana	Southern terminus; continuation into Florida
Grady	Cairo	17.728	28.530	SR 93 south / SR 188 begins – Beachton, Tallahassee	Southern end of SR 93 and SR 188 concurrencies; western terminus of SR 188
Grady	Cairo	18.079	29.095	SR 38 Conn. east (1st Avenue Northeast) – Thomasville, Quitman	Western terminus of SR 38 Conn.
Grady	Cairo	18.453	29.697	US 84 east / SR 38 east (38th Boulevard Northeast) / SR 188 east (5th Street Northeast) – Thomasville	Southern end of US 84/SR 38 concurrency; northern end of SR 188 concurrency
Grady	Cairo	18.964	30.520	US 84 west / SR 38 west – Bainbridge	Northern end of US 84/SR 38 concurrency
Grady		22.838	36.754	SR 93 north – Pelham	Northern end of SR 93 concurrency
Thomas	Meigs	34.155	54.967	SR 3 Alt. south (Church Street) / Dixie Highway – Pelham, Ochlocknee	Southern end of SR 3 Alt. concurrency
Thomas		34.789	55.987	US 19 / SR 3 / SR 300 / SR 3 Alt. ends – Pelham, Thomasville	Northern end of SR 3 Alt. concurrency; northern terminus of SR 3 Alt.
Mitchell	No major junctions				
Colquitt		43.191	69.509	SR 202 south – Thomasville	Northern terminus of SR 202
Colquitt	Moultrie	52.711	84.830	SR 37 west (Camilla Highway) – Funston, Camilla	Southern end of SR 37 concurrency
Colquitt	Moultrie	53.018	85.324	SR 37 east (West Central Avenue) – Moultrie	Northern end of SR 37 concurrency
Colquitt	Moultrie	54.756	88.121	US 319 Bus. south / SR 33 south (North Main Street) – Doerun, Albany, Norman Park, Tifton	No access from SR 111 to US 319 Bus. north/SR 33 north or vice versa; northern terminus
1.000 mi = 1.609 km; 1.000 km = 0.621 mi: Concurrency terminus; Incomplete access
