= Georgia State Route 202 =

State highway in Georgia, United States

State Route 202
- SR 202 highlighted in red

Route information
- Maintained by GDOT
- Length: 15.6 mi (25.1 km)

Major junctions
- South end: US 19 / SR 3 / SR 300 north of Thomasville
- SR 188 north of Thomasville
- North end: SR 111 southwest of Moultrie

Location
- Country: United States
- State: Georgia
- Counties: Thomas, Colquitt

Highway system
- Georgia State Highway System; Interstate; US; State; Special
| ← SR 201 | → SR 203 |

State Route 202 (SR 202) is a south–north state highway in the southern part of the U.S. state of Georgia. Its routing lies within portions of Thomas and Colquitt counties.

== Route description ==
The route begins at an intersection with US 19/SR 3/SR 300 north of Thomasville, in Thomas County. It heads due north to a short concurrency with SR 188. A little ways north of the end of the concurrency, the route enters Colquitt County. It continues heading north until it meets its northern terminus, and intersection with SR 111 southwest of Moultrie.

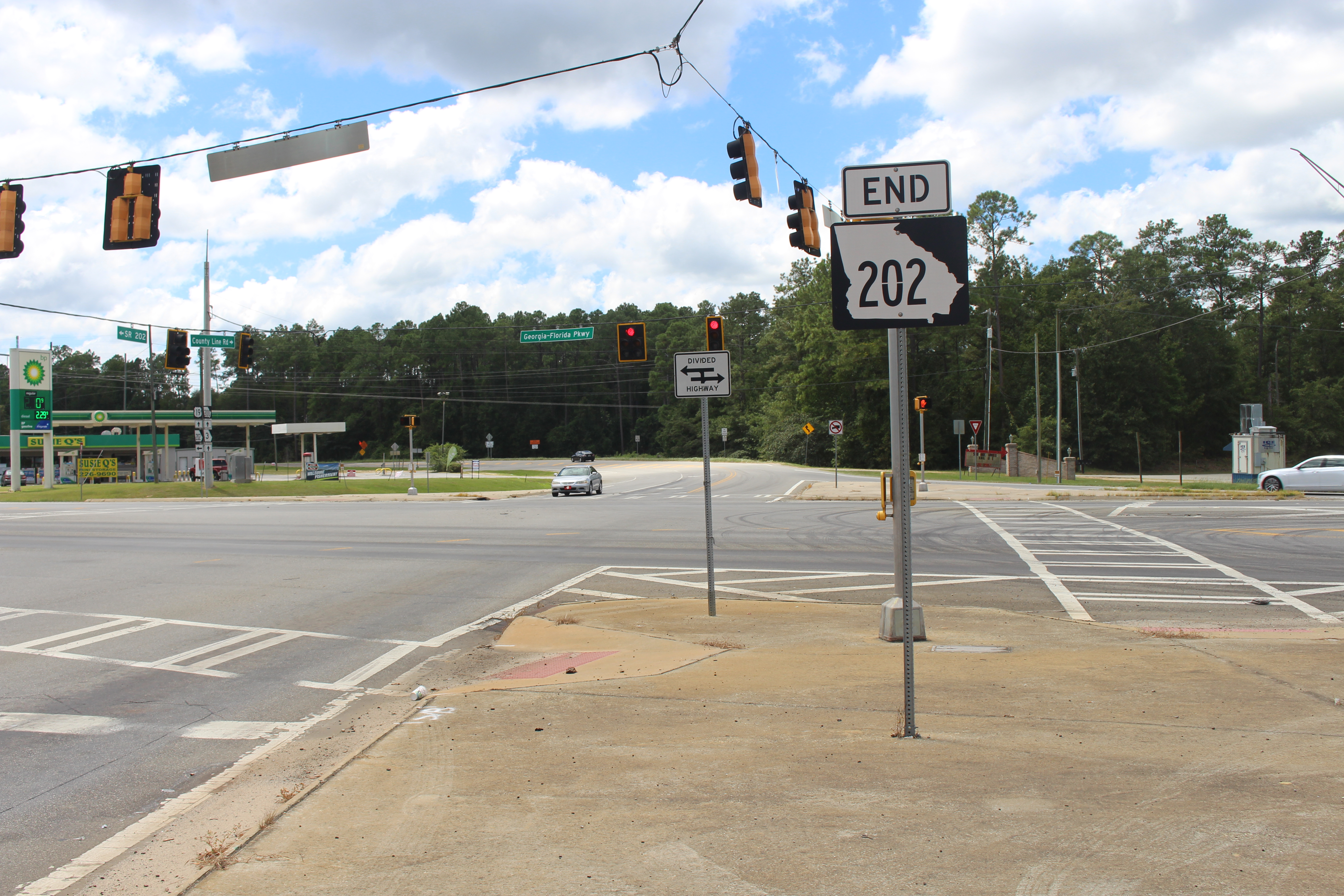
SR 202 end, Thomas County

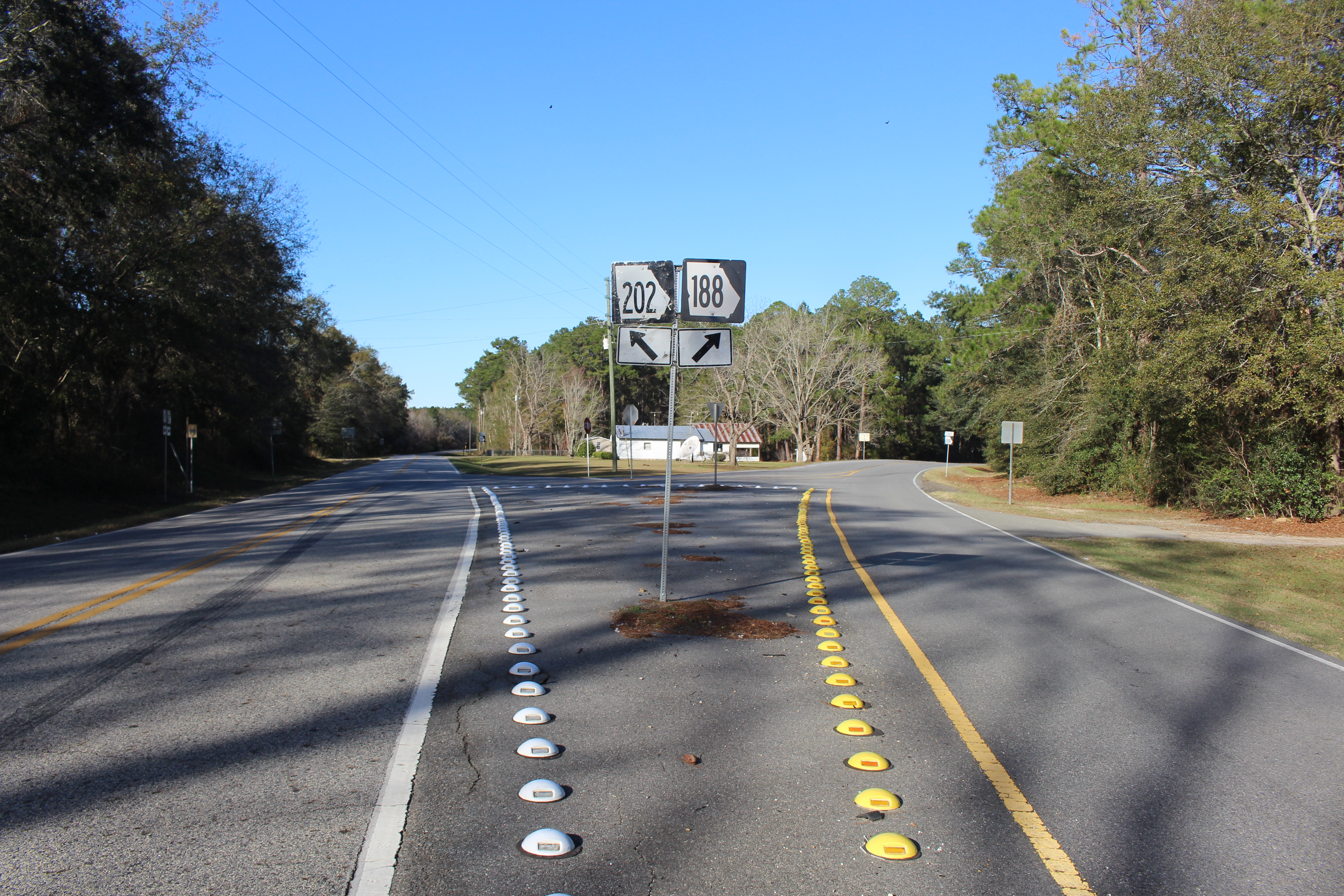
SR 188 202 split, Thomas County

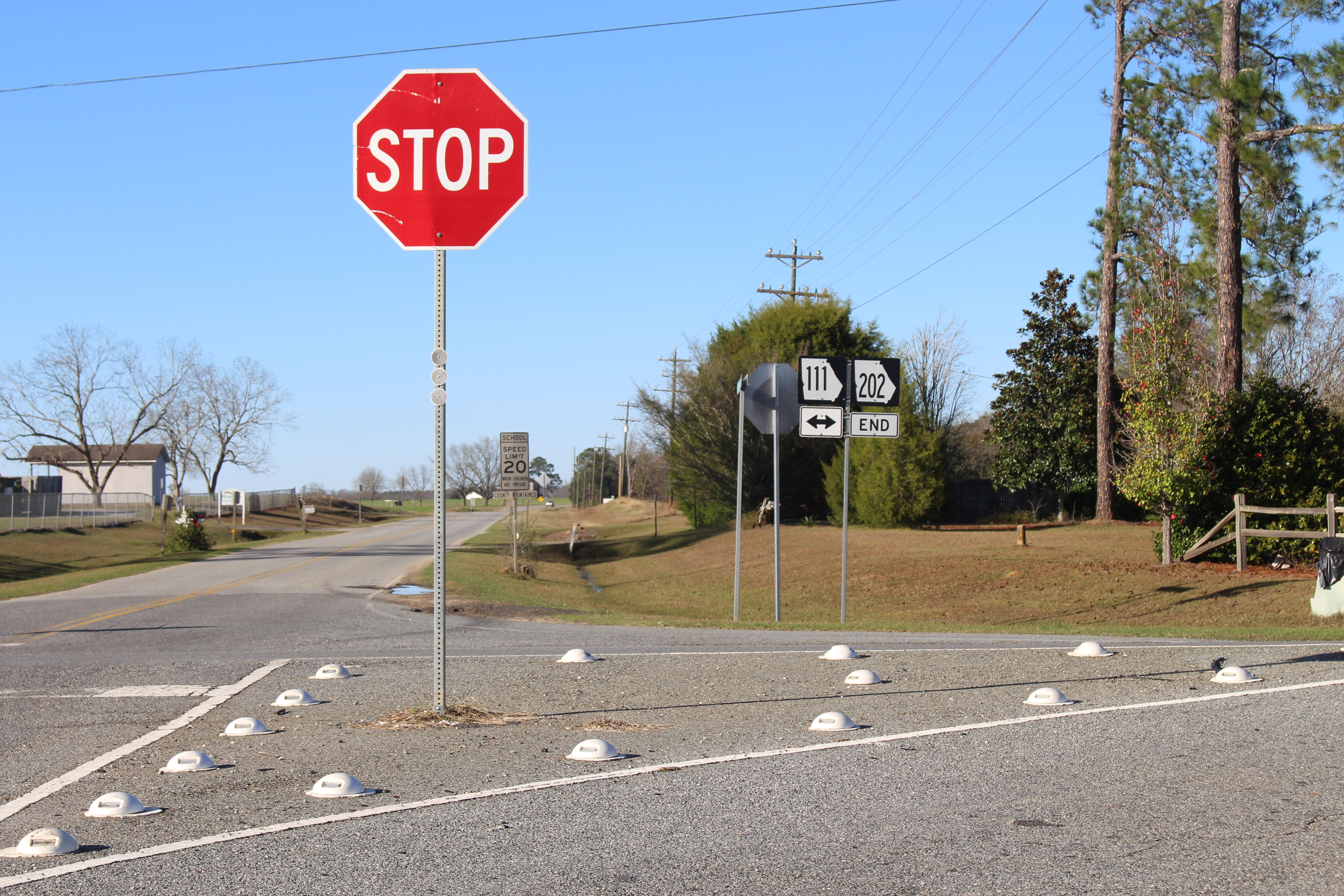
SR 202 end, Colquitt County

== Major intersections ==
| County | Location | mi | km | Destinations | Notes |
|---|---|---|---|---|---|
| Thomas | | 0.0 | 0.0 | US 19 / SR 3 / SR 300 | Southern terminus |
| Thomas | | 5.2 | 8.4 | SR 188 west – Ochlocknee | Southern end of SR 188 concurrency |
| Thomas | | 6.6 | 10.6 | SR 188 east – Coolidge | Northern end of SR 188 concurrency |
| Colquitt | | 15.6 | 25.1 | SR 111 – Meigs, Moultrie | Northern terminus |
1.000 mi = 1.609 km; 1.000 km = 0.621 mi: Concurrency terminus
