= Billy Fallin =

American politician (1932–2025)

Member of the Georgia House of Representatives
- In office 1967–1971

Personal details
- Born: September 9, 1932; Thomas County, Georgia, U.S.
- Died: January 4, 2025 (aged 92)
- Political party: Democratic
- Spouse: Barbara Vines (m. 1957)
- Children: 3
- Parents: Brady Fallin (father); Ernestine Cason (mother)

William Gene Fallin (September 9, 1932 – January 4, 2025) was an American politician from the state of Georgia. He served as a Democratic member of the Georgia House of Representatives from 1967 to 1971.

== Life and career ==
Fallin was born in Thomas County, Georgia, on September 9, 1932, the son of Brady Ernestine née Cason Fallin. The moved to Moultrie, Georgia, when he was a child, and he would spend most of his life there. He attended Georgia Military College, then received a B.A. in history from Mercer University and a J.D. from its Walter F. George School of Law. He served in the U.S. Army during the Korean War, then practiced law for over sixty years. In the 1960s, he was solicitor for Colquitt County, Georgia, resigning in 1967 to take a seat in the Georgia House of Representatives. After two terms in the legislature, he became member and chair of the Colquitt County board of commissioners in 1971, and he held that position for twelve years. In 1976, he was elected president of the Association County Commissioners of Georgia. A political comeback attempt failed in 1988, with Fallin taking 40.6% in the Democratic primary for state representative against incumbent C. J. Powell. He remained active in Moultrie, promoting education, the arts, and historic preservation. He died on January 4, 2025, at the age of 92.
