= Georgia State Route 3 =

State highway in southern and central Georgia

State Route 3

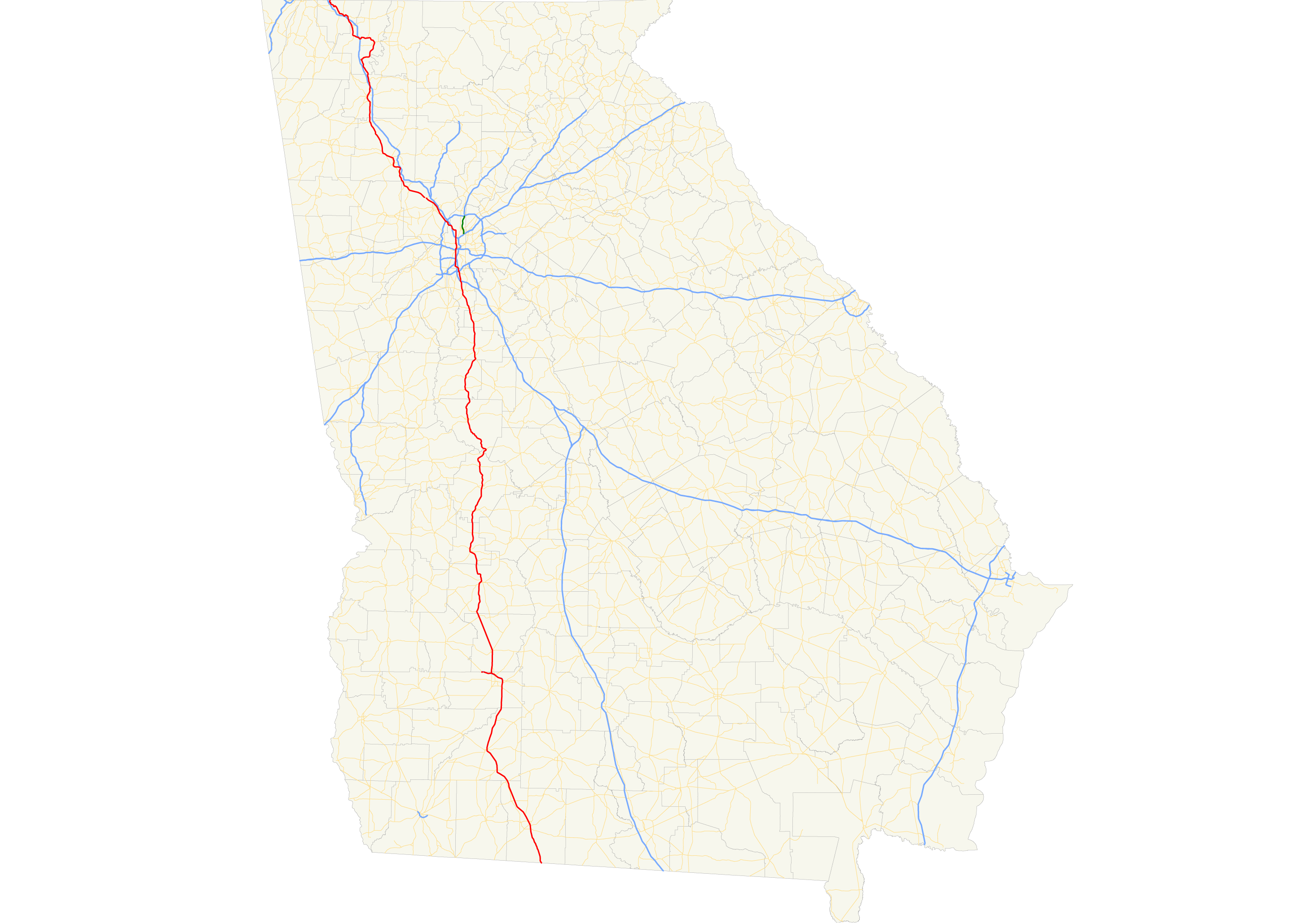

Route information
- Maintained by GDOT
- Length: 351 mi (565 km)
- Existed: 1919–present

Major junctions
- South end: US 19 at the Florida state line south-southeast of Thomasville
- US 82 / SR 300 / SR 520 in Albany; SR 96 / SR 540 in Butler; US 41 / SR 7 / SR 155 south of Griffin; I-75 at various locations; I-285 in Forest Park; US 19 / US 29 / US 78 / US 278 / SR 8 / SR 9 in Atlanta; I-285 east of Smyrna; SR 5 in Marietta; US 411 / SR 20 / SR 61 in Cartersville; US 76 / SR 52 in Dalton
- North end: US 41 / US 76 / SR 8 at Tennessee state line in East Ridge

Location
- Country: United States
- State: Georgia
- Counties: Thomas, Mitchell, Dougherty, Lee, Sumter, Schley, Taylor, Upson, Pike, Spalding, Henry, Clayton, Fulton, Cobb, Bartow, Gordon, Whitfield, Catoosa

Highway system
- Georgia State Highway System; Interstate; US; State; Special
← SR 2	→ SR 4

State Route 3 (SR 3) is a state highway that travels south-to-north through portions of the western part of the U.S. state of Georgia, roughly paralleling Interstate 75 (I-75). The highway travels from its southern terminus at the Florida state line, where SR 3 and SR 300 both reach their southern terminus, concurrent with US 19. Here, US 19 travels concurrent with State Road 57, 12 miles (19 km) south-southeast of Thomasville. SR 3 travels through portions of Thomas, Mitchell, Dougherty, Lee, Sumter, Schley, Taylor, Upson, Pike, Spalding, Henry, Clayton, Fulton, Cobb, Bartow, Gordon, Whitfield, and Catoosa counties to its northern terminus at the Tennessee state line, in East Ridge, where US 41/US 76 continue, concurrent with State Route 8. It travels through Thomasville, Albany, Griffin, Atlanta, Calhoun, and Dalton. At 351 miles (565 km) long, it is considered the third-longest signed state highway in the U.S. state of Georgia, only behind State Routes 1 and 11.

== Route description ==
=== Southern and central Georgia ===
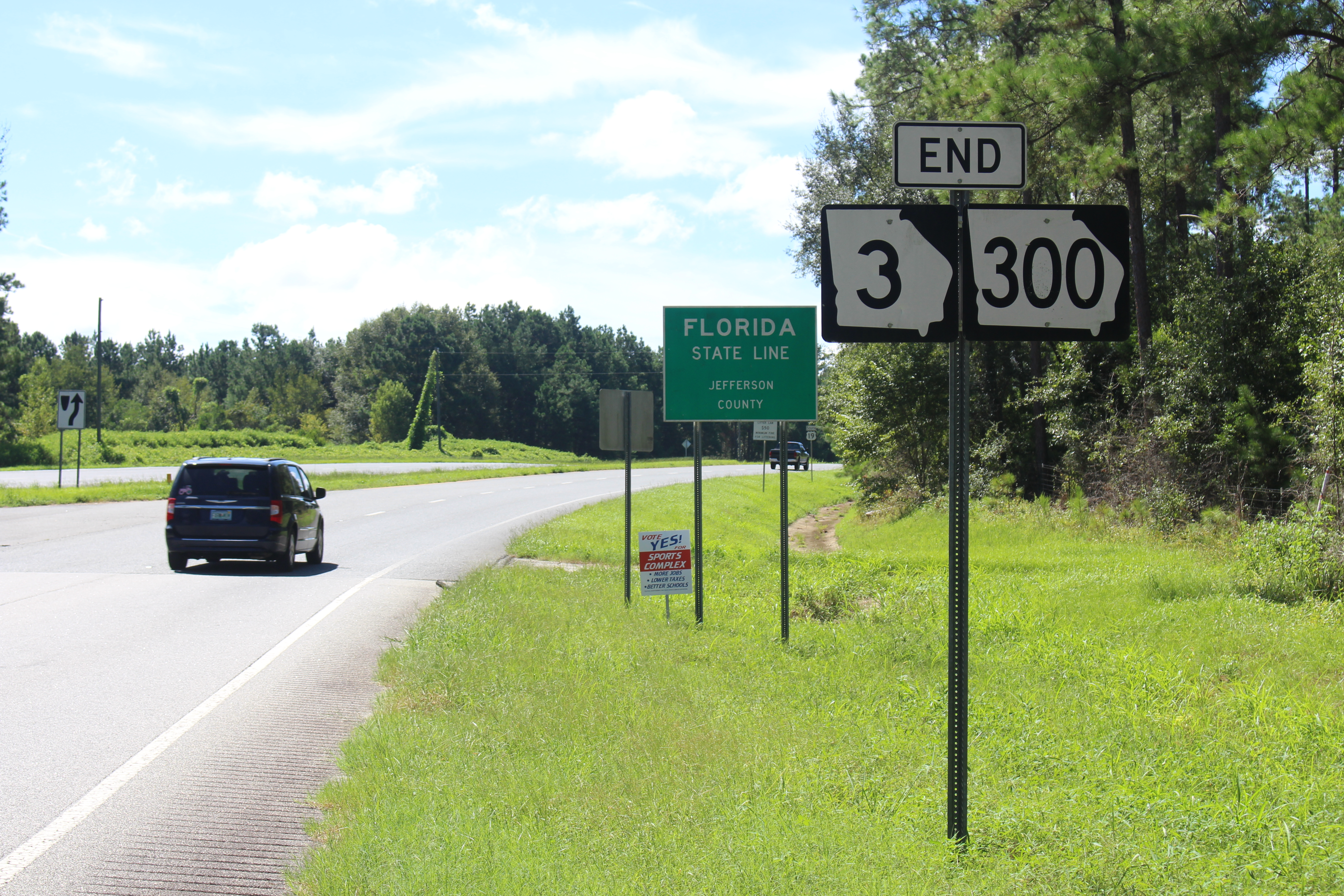
Southern terminus of SR 3/SR 300 at the FL state line.

SR 3 starts at the Florida state line in Thomas County, and is concurrent with US 19 and SR 300 from its inception. SR 3 heads slightly northwest and skirts east past Thomasville, before heading through Pelham to Camilla in Mitchell County. SR 3 turns slightly northeast in Camilla and heads through Baconton, Georgia to Albany in Dougherty County, where its concurrency with SR 300 ends, before turning north and heading to Leesburg in Lee County. In Leesburg, the highway turns slightly northwest once more, travels through Smithville, and enters Sumter County.

Turning north again, SR 3 continues through Americus and enters Schley County, curving slightly northwest to Ellaville. Leaving Ellaville in a northerly direction again, SR 3 bisects Schley County and heads into Taylor County and through Butler into Upson County. Just after entering Upson County, the highway turns northwest yet again and travels to Thomaston. Turning back to the north, SR 3 enters Pike County, and travels through Zebulon on its way slightly northeast to Griffin in Spalding County. South of Griffin, SR 3 intersects and begins a concurrency with US 41, in addition to its continued concurrence with US 19. SR 3 also features a brief freeway section as it travels through the western portion of Griffin.

=== Metro Atlanta ===
Heading north, the route enters the western portion of Henry County, and heads through Hampton, where the Atlanta Motor Speedway has direct access from the highway, which regularly sees massive backups on weekends when NASCAR races take place there. Continuing north into Clayton County, SR 3 heads through Jonesboro, and crosses I-75 in Morrow.

Heading north through Forest Park, the highway first enters Fulton County, then crosses I-285, and I-75 again, as well as I-85, in quick succession, as it makes its way through the southern Atlanta suburban communities of Hapeville and East Point, forming one side of the perimeter of Hartsfield-Jackson Atlanta International Airport near Hapeville. Turning north, the highway parallels the Downtown Connector very closely, crosses I-20 in downtown Atlanta, and continues north, beginning and ending concurrencies with US 19, US 78, and US 278, as well as forming part of the western boundary of the campus of Georgia Tech. SR 3 subsequently crosses I-75 for a third and fourth time just northwest of where I-75 and I-85 split, and crosses I-285 once more east of Smyrna, just after having entered Cobb County.

=== Northern Georgia ===
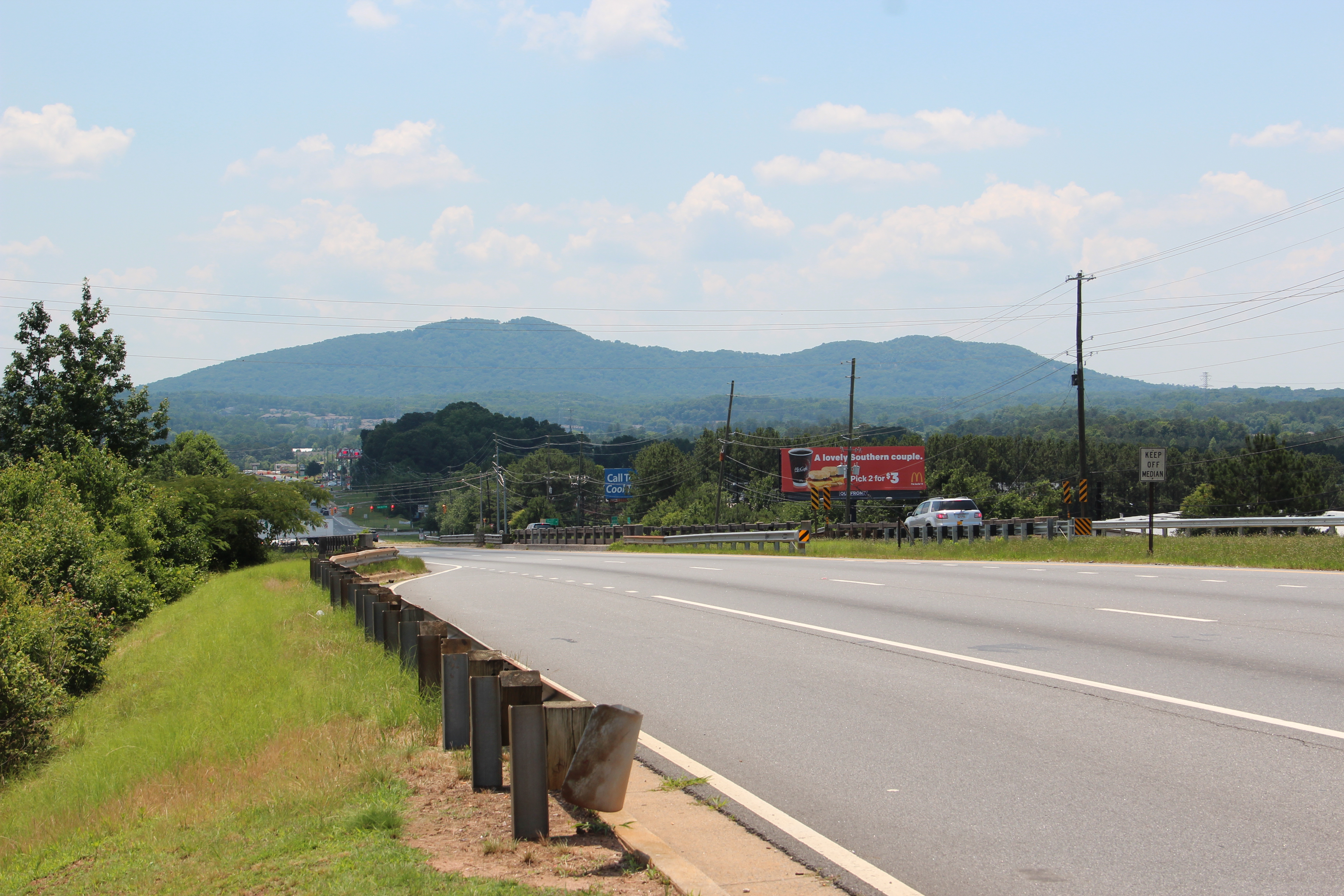
Kennesaw Mountain (left) and Little Kennesaw Mountain (right) viewed from SR 3.

Heading northwest through Marietta and Kennesaw, the highway leaves the Atlanta area and enters Bartow County, through Emerson, Cartersville and Adairsville, and on into Gordon County. SR 3 heads through Calhoun, crosses I-75 for a fifth time just south of Resaca, and continues to head north into Whitfield County. Heading through Dalton, the route crosses I-75 yet again, before heading northwest into Catoosa County, where it crosses I-75 for the seventh and final time, before reaching its northern terminus at the Tennessee state line, south of Chattanooga. Here, US 41, joined by US 76, enters Tennessee, concurrent with unsigned state highway SR 8.

=== National Highway System ===
The following portions of SR 3 are part of the National Highway System, a system of routes determined to be the most important for the nation's economy, mobility, and defense:

- From the Florida state line to the I-75 interchange west of Morrow
- From about I-20, on the Adair Park–Pittsburgh neighborhood line in central Atlanta, to the Berkeley Park–Loring Heights–Channing Valley–Collier Hills neighborhood quadripoint in the north-central part of the city
- From the I-285 interchange, on the Smyrna–Vinings line, to the intersection with the eastern terminus of Black Acre Trail and the southern terminus of 3rd Army Road in Acworth
- From the bridge over the Etowah River in Cartersville to the bridge over Two Run Creek just north of Cassville
- From the SR 53 intersection in the southern part of Calhoun to the central part of the city
- From the intersection with the eastern terminus of SR 3 Conn. south-southwest of Dalton to the I-75 interchange in the northwestern part of the city
- From about Tunnel Hill to the I-75 interchange south-southeast of Stone Church

== History ==
=== 1920s ===
SR 3 was established at least as early as 1919 starting at the Florida state line southwest of Thomasville; no numbered highway extended south-southeast from that city at the time. SR 3 traveled on essentially the same path as it currently does. The main differences were the southern terminus and the northern terminus. It traveled north from Ringgold to the Tennessee state line. By the end of 1926, US 41 had been designated on the entire length of SR 3 from Griffin to the Tennessee state line. Seven segments of the highway had a "completed hard surface": a segment in the northern part of Thomasville, from approximately Ochlocknee to north-northeast of Camilla, from the Mitchell–Dougherty county line to Albany, from south of Americus to Ellaville, from north-northeast of Zebulon to just south of the Spalding–Henry county line, from just north of this county line to just south-southeast of the Henry–Clayton county line, and from just north-northwest of this county line to Marietta. Five segments of the highway had a "completed semi hard surface": a segment south of the Mitchell–Dougherty county line, from Leesburg to the Lee–Sumter county line, from Cartersville to the southeastern part of Calhoun, a segment in the northwestern part of Dalton, and from Ringgold to the Tennessee state line. Ten segments of the highway had a "sand clay or top soil" surface: a segment on both sides of the Grady–Thomas county line, a segment north-northwest of Thomasville, from Ellaville to north-northeast of Rupert, a segment just north-northeast of Butler, from the south end of the SR 22 concurrency to south-southeast of Thomaston, from south of the Upson–Pike county line to Zebulon, a segment in the northwestern part of Marietta, from just south of the Cobb–Bartow county line to Cartersville, from just south of the Gordon–Murray county line to Dalton, and from northwest of Dalton to Ringgold. Six segments of the highway were indicated to be under construction: a segment north of the Lee–Sumter county line, from south-southeast of Thomaston to north-northwest of that city, a segment north-northeast of Zebulon, from just south of the Spalding–Henry county line to just north of that line, from northwest of Marietta to just south of the Cobb–Bartow county line, and from the southeastern part of Calhoun to just south of the Gordon–Murray county line. By the end of 1929, US 19 was designated on the then-current highway from the Florida state line to Atlanta. Also, an unnumbered road was built on the current path of SR 3 south-southeast of Thomasville.

=== 1930s ===
By the middle of 1930, SR 35 was designated on the unnumbered road south-southeast of Thomasville. Four segments of SR 3 had a completed hard surface: from Thomasville to Albany, from Leesburg to Ellaville, from south-southeast of Thomaston to north-northwest of that city, and from north-northeast of Zebulon to Ringgold. Two segments had a sand clay or top soil surface: from Butler to south-southeast of Thomaston and from north-northwest of that city to north-northeast of Zebulon. Two segments were under construction: from Albany to Leesburg and from Ringgold to the Tennessee state line. By the end of the year, the Albany–Ellaville segment and the Rinngold–Tennessee segment had a completed hard surface. A segment south of Zebulon had a sand clay or top soil surface. From the Florida state line to Thomasville and a segment north-northeast of Zebulon were indicated to be under construction. By the end of 1931, three segments had a completed hard surface: from the Florida state line to Thomasville, a segment north of Ellaville, and a segment north-northeast of Zebulon. Two segments were under construction: from north of Ellaville to Butler and a segment south of Zebulon. In January 1932, the entire highway from Florida to north of Ellaville had a completed hard surface. In April that year, the entire highway from south-southeast of Thomaston to the Tennessee state line had a completed hard surface. A segment south-southeast of Thomaston was under construction. Later that year, the segment from north of Ellaville to Butler had a sand clay or top soil surface. From Butler to the south end of the SR 22 concurrency was under construction. Before the year ended, this segment had a completed hard surface. The segment of SR 3 from the south end of SR 22 concurrency to south-southeast of Thomaston, as well as the segment of SR 35 in the southern part of Thomasville, was under construction. By the middle of 1933, the segment from north of Ellaville to Butler had a completed hard surface. The segment from the south end of the SR 22 concurrency to south-southeast of Thomaston had completed grading, but had no surface course. By the end of the year, all of the then-current path of SR 3 had a completed hard surface. In 1934, the segment north of Ringgold was shifted west to travel northwest from that city. A segment north-northwest of Thomasville, as well as the Pelham–Camilla segment, was under construction. By the end of the year, a segment of SR 35 south-southeast of Thomasville had a completed hard surface. From the Florida state line to south-southeast of the city, this segment was under construction. By April 1935, the central portion of the segment of SR 35 had completed grading, but was not surfaced. By the end of the year, nearly the segment of SR 35 had a completed hard surface. By the middle of 1936, the entire segment of SR 35 had a completed hard surface. Late in 1937, US 19 south of Thomasville was shifted eastward to travel concurrently with this segment of SR 35, with US 319 designated on its former path southwest of Thomasville. SR 3 was split into two parts between Atlanta and the northwest part of Marietta. US 41/SR 3 traveled northwest on the original path, while SR 3E traveled north-northwest on a more eastern path between the two cities. SR 3E's path from SR 120 in the east part of Marietta to US 41/SR 3 in the northwestern part of the city. The rest of SR 3E was under construction. By the end of the year, SR 3W was established, traveling northwest with US 41 on Marietta Street and Old Marietta Road, while SR 3E traveled north-northwest on Hemphill Street and Northside Drive. All of SR 3E in the northern part of Atlanta was hard surfaced. From the north part of the city to the northwest part, the highway had completed grading, but was not surfaced. Later that year, all of SR 3E from Atlanta to northwest of the Fulton–Cobb county line had a completed hard surface.

=== 1940s and 1950s ===
In 1940, nearly the entire segment of SR 3E in Marietta had a completed hard surface. It was under construction from northwest of the Fulton–Cobb county line to the eastern part of Marietta. By the end of the next year, the entire length of SR 3E had a completed hard surface. By the end of 1946, SR 3W was projected to be designated from the western part of Albany to US 19/SR 3 north of the city. The SR 3W in Atlanta and Marietta was redesignated as part of the SR 3 mainline. By February 1948, SR 3E in Atlanta was moved off of Hemphill Avenue. It, along with US 41 Temp., followed US 19 on Spring Street, then traveled west on 14th Street and resumed the Northside Drive path. The segment of US 41 on SR 3W in this area was redesignated as US 41 Alt. By April 1949, US 41 Alt. was redesignated as US 41 Byp. US 41 Temp./SR 3E's southbound lanes traveled on Hemphill Avenue. The southern part of SR 3W in Albany was hard surfaced, while its northern part had completed grading, but was not surfaced. By the middle of 1950, US 41 Byp. was redesignated as part of the US 41 mainline. US 41 Temp./SR 3E was shifted off of US 19 on Spring Street and 14th Street, and traveled on Hemphill Avenue again. The entire length of SR 3W in Albany was hard surfaced. By the end of 1951, an "Expressway" (currently part of the I-75 path in the southern part of Atlanta) was built east of US 19/US 41/SR 3. In 1952, US 41 Temp. was redesignated as part of the US 41 mainline, which was shifted off of SR 3W and onto SR 3E. The next year, US 19/US 41/SR 3 was shifted eastward onto the "Expressway" in the southern part of Atlanta, traveled west on Lakewood Avenue, and then resumed the northern path. The former path became US 19 Bus./US 41 Bus. By June 1954, SR 3W was designated between Atlanta and Marietta. By June 1955, it was redesignated as SR 3. By July 1957, SR 3 in the northern part of Albany was redesignated as SR 3 Conn. due to the SR 3W in the city being redesignated as part of SR 3. Between Griffin and Lovejoy, SR 3 was shifted off of US 19/US 41 to the east.

=== 1960s ===
By June 1960, I-75/SR 401 were designated on US 19/US 41/SR 3 in the southern part of Atlanta, ending at Lakewood Avenue. I-75/SR 401 was also designated on the concurrency from Northside Drive to Northside Parkway. SR 3 Conn. in Albany was redesignated as the SR 3 mainline, and its old path was redesignated as SR 3W. By June 1963, SR 333 was designated on US 19 from the Florida state line to Camilla, which truncated SR 35 Thomasville. SR 3's Thomasville–Meigs segment was shifted westward onto US 19 Bus. Its former path, on US 19, was redesignated as part of SR 333. SR 333 was also designated on a sole path from Camilla to Albany. The path of SR 3 in Thomaston was split into SR 3W and SR 3E. It was unclear as to which highway US 19 traveled on. SR 333 was designated on US 19/US 41 from SR 16 in Griffin to an indeterminate location between Jonesboro and Hapeville. SR 333 was designated on US 19/US 41 from Griffin to Lovejoy, and on US 19/US 41/SR 3 from there to south-southwest of Forest Park. By the end of 1965, US 19 between Camilla and Albany was shifted eastward to travel concurrently with SR 333. It was unclear if the northern terminus of SR 333 was truncated to Lovejoy or not. SR 3S was designated in Marietta from SR 3 to SR 5. SR 3 Conn. in Marietta was designated from SR 5 to SR 3. US 19/US 41/SR 3 was shifted onto the former path of US 19 Bus./US 41 Bus. in the Atlanta area. The northern terminus of US 19 Bus. in the southern part of the state was truncated to just east of Ochlocknee. In 1968, a northern extension of SR 333 was projected to be designated from its US 19/US 82/SR 50S interchange in the eastern part of Albany north and northwest to US 19/SR 3W in the northwestern part of the city.

=== 1970s to 2000s ===
In 1970, all of SR 333 north of Griffin was also decommissioned. In 1973, SR 3W in Albany was redesignated as SR 3, while its former path was redesignated as part of SR 133. In 1974, a freeway was built on the northern extension of SR 333 in Albany, but there was no indication as to what highways were designated on it. Three years later, US 19 through the main part of Albany was shifted northeast to travel concurrently with the SR 333 freeway. By March 1980, US 82 in Albany was also shifted onto the freeway. Between 1974 and March 1980, SR 3S in Marietta was redesignated as SR 3 Spur. Later that year, the northern terminus of SR 333 was truncated to the US 19/US 19 Bus./US 82/US 82 Bus./SR 50/SR 50 Bus./SR 62/SR 333 interchange in Albany, with SR 50 shifted onto the freeway. In 1982, all of SR 333 that remained was redesignated as SR 300. In 1983, the segment of SR 3 from the Florida state line to Thomasville was shifted eastward onto US 19/SR 300. All of SR 3 from the Meigs area to Albany was shifted eastward onto US 19/SR 300. Between 1978 and 1985, SR 3 Conn. in Marietta was decommissioned. Between March 1980 and 1985, SR 3 Spur in Marietta was decommissioned. In 1985, US 19/US 82/SR 3/SR 300 were designated on the freeway in Albany. It was named Liberty Expressway. Also, SR 3E in the Atlanta area was decommissioned. In 1986, US 19 Bus. in the southern part of the state was decommissioned. The next year, SR 3W in Thomaston was redesignated as SR 3S, and SR 3E there was redesignated as SR 3N. In 1988, SR 50 was truncated to its current eastern terminus, with its entire former path redesignated as part of SR 520. SR 3N in Thomaston was redesignated as the northbound lanes of SR 3, while SR 3W there was redesignated as the southbound lanes. In 2000, SR 3 between Thomasville and Meigs was shifted eastward onto US 19/SR 300. Its former path became SR 3 Alt.

On April 2, 1980, SR 3 was designated as the 'Andersonville Trail' at the concurrence of SR 3 with US 280 in Americus.

On May 4, 1992, SR 3 was designated as the 'Admiral Mack Gaston Parkway' where SR 3 connects SR 52 and SR 71 in Dalton.

== Major intersections ==
County	Location	mi	km	Exit	Destinations	Notes
Thomas		0.0	0.0		US 19 south (Florida–Georgia Parkway / SR 57) / SR 300 begins – Monticello	Southern terminus of SR 3/SR 300 at the Florida state line; continues south as US 19/SR 57; southern end of US 19 and SR 300 concurrencies
see SR 300
Dougherty	Albany	70.6	113.6	3	US 82 east / SR 520 east / SR 300 north (Clark Avenue) – Atlanta, Cordele, Sylvester, Tifton	Northern end of SR 300 concurrency; southern end of US 82/SR 520 concurrency
Dougherty	Albany	71.9	115.7	4	Blaylock Street	
Dougherty	Albany	73.9	118.9	5	SR 91 / SR 133 north (Jefferson Street) – Downtown Albany	Northern end of SR 133 concurrency; signed northbound as exits 5A (north) and 5B (south)
Dougherty	Albany	75.2	121.0		US 82 west / SR 520 west (Liberty Expressway) / US 19 Bus. south / US 82 Bus. east / SR 520 Bus. east (Slappey Boulevard) – Dawson, Columbus	Northern end of US 82/SR 520 concurrency; northern terminus of US 19 Bus.; western terminus of US 82 Bus./SR 520 Bus.; US 19 north follows exit 6A; US 19 Bus./US 82 Bus./SR 520 Bus. is exit 6B northbound.
Lee		78.2	125.9		SR 133 south (Forrester Parkway) – Doerun, The Parks at Chehaw	Northern terminus of SR 133
Lee	Leesburg	82.5	132.8		US 19 Byp. north / SR 3 Byp. north / SR 32 west (Dawson Road) / SR 32 Truck east (Robert B. Lee Drive) – Dawson, Americus	Southern end of SR 32 concurrency; southern terminus of US 19 Byp./SR 3 Byp.; western terminus of SR 32 Truck
Lee	Leesburg	83.4	134.2		SR 32 east (4th Street) – Leslie, De Soto, Ashburn	Northern end of SR 32 concurrency, former southern terminus of SR 195
Lee	Leesburg	84.0	135.2		US 19 Byp. south / SR 3 Byp. south – Dawson, Albany	Northern terminus of US 19 Byp./SR 3 Byp.
Lee	Leesburg	84.4	135.8		SR 195 north – Leslie	Southern terminus of SR 195
Lee	Smithville	96.0	154.5		SR 118 (Long Drive) – Dawson, Bronwood, Downtown Smithville	
Lee		98.1	157.9		SR 308 west (Bond Trail Road)	Eastern terminus of SR 308
Sumter		108	174		US 280 west / SR 27 west / SR 49 south / Spring Street – Plains, Dawson	Southern end of US 280/SR 27/SR 49 concurrency
Sumter	Americus	109	175		US 280 east / SR 27 east / SR 30 east / SR 49 north (West Lamar Street) – Cordele, Oglethorpe, Georgia Southwestern State University, Habitat for Humanity Global Village & Discovery Center	Northern end of US 280/SR 27/SR 49 concurrency; southern end of SR 30 concurrency
Sumter	Americus	110	180		SR 30 west (Adderton Street) – Concord, Buena Vista	Northern end of SR 30 concurrency
Schley		118	190		SR 271 east – Andersonville	Western terminus of SR 271
Schley		121	195		SR 228 east – Andersonville	Western terminus of SR 228
Schley		121	195		Andersonville Road	Former SR 228 west
Schley	Ellaville	122	196		SR 26 – Ellaville, Oglethorpe	
Schley	Murrays Crossroads	128	206		SR 240 – Tazewell	
Taylor		135	217		SR 90 west / SR 127 west – Mauk	Southern end of SR 90/SR 127 concurrency
Taylor		136	219		SR 127 east – Marshallville	Northern end of SR 127 concurrency
Taylor	Rupert	137	220		SR 90 east – Ideal, Andersonville National Historic Site	Northern end of SR 90 concurrency
Taylor	Butler	145	233		SR 96 (Butler Bypass) / SR 540 – Geneva, Fort Valley, Columbus	
Taylor	Butler	146	235		SR 137 – Buena Vista, Fort Valley, Southern Crescent Technical College Taylor County Center	
Taylor		153	246		SR 208 (Old Wire Road) – Talbotton, Roberta	
Taylor		158	254		US 80 west / SR 22 west – Talbotton, Columbus	Southern end of US 80/SR 22 concurrency
Upson		160	260		US 80 east / SR 22 east – Macon	Northern end of US 80/SR 22 concurrency
Upson	Thomaston	173	278		SR 36 east / SR 74 east (Gordon Street) – Barnesville, Jackson, Yatesville, Macon	Eastbound lanes of SR 36/SR 74 on one-way pair
Upson	Thomaston	174	280		SR 36 west / SR 74 west (Main Street) – Woodbury, Greenville, Woodland, Columbus	Westbound lanes of SR 36/SR 74 on one-way pair
Pike		185	298		SR 109 west – Lifsey Springs, Molena	Southern end of SR 109 concurrency
Pike		186	299		SR 109 east – Meansville	Northern end of SR 109 concurrency
Pike	Zebulon	190	310		SR 18 – Concord, Barnesville	
Spalding		197	317		US 41 south / SR 7 south (Martin L. King Jr. Parkway) / US 19 Bus. north / US 41 Bus. north / SR 155 north (Zebulon Parkway) – Barnesville, Griffin, Airport	Southern end of US 41 concurrency; northern terminus of SR 7; southern terminus of US 19 Bus./US 41 Bus./SR 155
see US 41
Hamilton	East Ridge	351	565		US 41 north / US 76 west (Ringgold Road / SR 8 north) – Chattanooga	Northern terminus at the Tennessee state line; southern terminus of SR 8; northern end of US 41 and US 76 concurrencies
1.000 mi = 1.609 km; 1.000 km = 0.621 mi: Concurrency terminus

== Special routes ==
=== Thomasville–Meigs alternate route ===
State Route 3 Alternate
- Location: Thomasville to Meigs
- Length: 18.9 mi (30.4 km)
- Existed: 2000–present

State Route 3 Alternate (SR 3 Alt.) is an 18.9-mile-long (30.4 km) alternate route of SR 3. It uses an older routing of US 19/SR 3 for 15.5 miles (24.9 km) between Thomasville and Meigs. At least as early as 1919, SR 3 traveled between Thomasville and Meigs, like it does today. By the end of 1926, a segment north-northwest of Thomasville had a "sand clay or top soil" surface. By the end of 1929, US 19 was designated on SR 3 in the state. By the middle of 1930, the segment of US 19/SR 3 between Thomasville and Meigs had a "completed hard surface". By June 1963, SR 333 had been designated on this stretch of US 19, with SR 3 being shifted westward onto US 19 Bus. By the end of 1965, the northern terminus of US 19 Bus. was truncated to just east of Ochlocknee. In 1986, US 19 Bus. was decommissioned. In 2000, the segment of SR 3 between Thomasville and Meigs was shifted eastward, onto US 19/SR 300. Its former path became SR 3 Alt.

The entire route is in Thomas County.

Location	mi	km	Destinations	Notes
	0.0	0.0	US 19 / US 84 east / SR 3 / SR 38 east / SR 300 (Georgia–Florida Parkway) / US 319 north / SR 35 north (North Thomasville Bypass) – Albany, Valdosta, Thomasville, Moultrie, Southwest Ga. Tech College	Southern terminus; south end of US 84/US 319/SR 35/SR 38 concurrency
	2.7	4.3	US 84 west / US 319 south / SR 35 south / SR 38 west (North Thomasville Bypass) / US 84 Bus. east / SR 38 Bus. east / Dixie Highway south – Cairo, Thomasville	North end of US 84/US 319/SR 35/SR 38 concurrency; south end of Dixie Highway Scenic Byway concurrency; western terminus of US 84 Bus./SR 38 Bus.
Ochlocknee	11.0	17.7	SR 188 (Stewart Road/Willow Street) – Cairo, Moultrie	
Meigs	18.2	29.3	SR 111 south (Depot Street) / Dixie Highway (Church Street) to US 19 – Cairo	South end of SR 111 concurrency; north end of Dixie Highway Scenic Byway concurrency
	18.9	30.4	US 19 / SR 3 / SR 300 (Georgia–Florida Parkway) / SR 111 north – Thomasville, Pelham, Moultrie	Northern terminus; north end of SR 111 concurrency
1.000 mi = 1.609 km; 1.000 km = 0.621 mi: Concurrency terminus

=== Albany connector route ===
State Route 3 Connector
- Location: Albany
- Existed: 1957–1960

State Route 3 Connector (SR 3 Conn.) was a connecting route of SR 3 that existed completely in the city limits of Albany. It traversed portions of Dougherty and Lee counties. At least as early as 1919, SR 3 traveled on essentially the same path as it currently does through the Albany metropolitan area. By the end of 1926, the segment from the Mitchell–Dougherty county line to Albany had a "completed hard surface". By the end of 1929, US 19 was designated on the highway through Albany.

By the end of 1946, SR 3W was projected to be designated from the western part of Albany to US 19/SR 3 north of the city. By April 1949, the southern part of SR 3W was hard surfaced, while its northern part had completed grading, but was not surfaced. By the middle of 1950, the entire length of SR 3W was hard surfaced. By July 1957, SR 3 in the northern part of Albany was redesignated as SR 3 Conn. due to SR 3W being redesignated as part of SR 3. By June 1960, SR 3 Conn. was redesignated as the SR 3 mainline, and its old path was redesignated as SR 3W.

=== Leesburg bypass ===
State Route 3 Bypass
- Location: Leesburg
- Length: 1.8 mi (2.9 km)

State Route 3 Bypass (SR 3 Byp.) is a 1.8-mile-long (2.9 km) western bypass of the town of Leesburg in Lee County, which was completed in 2009. It is concurrent with US 19 Byp. for its entire length. The entire length of SR 3 Byp. is part of the National Highway System, a system of routes determined to be the most important for the nation's economy, mobility, and defense.

=== Clayton County connector route ===
State Route 3 Connector
- Location: Clayton County
- Length: 1.1 mi (1.8 km)

The portion of Tara Boulevard in Clayton County that is not covered by US 19/US 41/SR 3 near Interstate 75 (I-75) is designated as State Route 3 Connector (SR 3 Conn.). The route is little more than a high-capacity set of ramps to and from I-75 and is unsigned. Its entire length is just west of Morrow.

The entire route is in Clayton County.

Location	mi	km	Destinations	Notes
	0.0	0.0	US 19 / US 41 / SR 3 (Tara Boulevard/Old Dixie Highway) – Jonesboro	Southern terminus
	1.1	1.8	I-75 (SR 401) – Macon, Atlanta	Northern terminus; I-75 exit 235; no access to I-75 south from SR 3 Conn. or to SR 3 Conn. from I-75 north; access is provided by US 19/US 41/SR 3 and Upper Riverdale Road.
1.000 mi = 1.609 km; 1.000 km = 0.621 mi: Incomplete access

=== Atlanta connector route ===
State Route 3 Connector
- Location: Atlanta
- Length: 0.2 mi (320 m)

State Route 3 Connector (SR 3 Conn.) is a 0.2-mile-long (0.32 km) connector route in the city limits of Atlanta. The entire length travels along the southeastern edge of Spelman College. It starts at an intersection with US 29/SR 14/SR 154, just northeast of an overpass for Interstate 20 (I-20). US 29/SR 3 Conn. travel north-northwest. Just before an intersection with Westview Drive, they curve to the northeast and meet the northern terminus of SR 3 Conn., an intersection with US 19/US 41/SR 3.

The entire route is in Atlanta, Fulton County.

mi	km	Destinations	Notes
0.0	0.0	US 29 south / SR 14 / SR 154 (Peter Street SW)	Southern terminus; south end of US 29 concurrency
0.2	0.32	US 19 / US 29 north / US 41 / SR 3 (Northside Drive SW) / Spelman Lane SW	Northern terminus; north end of US 29 concurrency
1.000 mi = 1.609 km; 1.000 km = 0.621 mi: Concurrency terminus

=== Atlanta spur route ===
State Route 3 Spur
- Location: Atlanta
- Existed: 1965–1969

State Route 3 Spur (SR 3 Spur) was a short-lived spur route of SR 3 that existed in the central part of the city limits of Atlanta. Between June 1963 and the beginning of 1966, it was established on the path of U.S. Route 41 (US 41; Northside Drive) from Marietta Street, where SR 3 split off of US 41, to an interchange with Interstate 75 (I-75), where SR 3E began a concurrency with US 41. In 1969, it was redesignated as a southern extension of SR 3E.

The entire route was in Atlanta, Fulton County.

mi	km	Destinations	Notes
		US 41 south (Northside Drive) / SR 3 (Northside Drive/Marietta Street)	Southern terminus; southern end of US 41 concurrency
		I-75 (SR 401) / US 41 north / SR 3E north (Northside Drive)	Northern terminus of SR 3 Spur; southern terminus of SR 3E; northern end of US 41 concurrency; I-75 exit 104
1.000 mi = 1.609 km; 1.000 km = 0.621 mi: Concurrency terminus

=== Marietta spur route ===
State Route 3 Spur
- Location: Marietta
- Existed: 1980–1985

State Route 3 Spur (SR 3 Spur) was a spur route of SR 3 that existed in Marietta. At least as early as 1919, SR 3 traveled on essentially the same path as it currently does through the city. By the end of 1926, US 41 had been designated on the entire length of SR 3 in this area. This segment of US 41/SR 3 had a "completed hard surface".

By the end of 1965, SR 3S was designated in Marietta from SR 3 to SR 5. Between 1974 and March 1980, SR 3S was redesignated as SR 3 Spur. Between March 1980 and 1985, SR 3 Spur was decommissioned.

=== Marietta connector route (1965–1984) ===
State Route 3 Connector
- Location: Marietta
- Existed: 1965–1984

State Route 3 Connector (SR 3 Conn.) was a connecting route of SR 3 in Marietta. it was designated from SR 5 to SR 3. In 1984, it was redesignated as part of SR 5.

=== Marietta connector route ===
State Route 3 Connector
- Location: Marietta
- Length: 1.6 mi (2.6 km)
- Existed: 2007–present

State Route 3 Connector (SR 3 Conn.) is a 1.6-mile-long (2.6 km) connector for SR 3 that exists entirely within the city limits of Marietta. It is known as Roswell Road for its entire length. It begins at an intersection with US 41/SR 3 (Cobb Parkway) in the east-central part of the city. Here, the roadway continues as Roswell Street. At this intersection is the Big Chicken restaurant of KFC. SR 3 Conn. proceeds to the east and has an incomplete interchange with the northbound lanes of Northwest Corridor Express Lanes of Interstate 75 (I-75). The highway then curves to the northeast and reaches its eastern terminus, an interchange with SR 120 (Marietta Parkway/Roswell Road) and the eastern terminus of SR 120 Alt. (Marietta Parkway).

The highway was formed in 2007 when SR 120 was rerouted out of downtown Marietta.

The entire route is in Marietta, Cobb County.

mi	km	Destinations	Notes
0.0	0.0	US 41 / SR 3 (Cobb Parkway) / Roswell Street west – Kennesaw, Marietta	Western terminus of SR 3 Conn. and Roswell Road; eastern terminus of Roswell Street
0.2	0.32	I-75 north (Northwest Corridor Express Lanes)	Usage requires a Peach Pass or other compatible transponder; no access to southbound I-75
1.6	2.6	SR 120 (Marietta Parkway / Roswell Road east) / SR 120 Alt. west (Marietta Parkway) to I-75	Eastern terminus of SR 3 Conn. and SR 120 Alt.; interchange; SR 120 takes on the Roswell Road name
1.000 mi = 1.609 km; 1.000 km = 0.621 mi: Electronic toll collection

=== Emerson connector route ===
State Route 3 Connector
- Location: Emerson
- Length: 0.2 mi (320 m)

The entire route is in Emerson, Bartow County.

mi	km	Destinations	Notes
0.0	0.0	SR 113 (Red Top Mountain Road) to I-75 / Lake Point Parkway south – Taylorsville, Rockmart	Future southern terminus of SR 3 Conn.; roadway continues as Lake Point Parkway
0.2	0.32	US 41 / SR 3 (Joe Frank Harris Parkway) – Emerson, Cartersville	Future northern terminus of SR 3 Conn.
1.000 mi = 1.609 km; 1.000 km = 0.621 mi

=== Whitfield County connector route ===
State Route 3 Connector
- Location: Whitfield County
- Length: 0.7 mi (1,100 m)

State Route 3 Connector (SR 3 Conn.) is in Whitfield County south of Dalton; it connects Interstate 75 (I-75) to US 41/SR 3 and the Dalton Bypass.

All of SR 3 Conn., from I-75 to its eastern terminus, is part of the National Highway System, a system of routes determined to be the most important for the nation's economy, mobility, and defense.

The entire route is in Whitfield County.

Location	mi	km	Destinations	Notes
	0.0	0.0	Dug Gap Road	Western terminus
	0.0	0.0	I-75 (SR 401) – Atlanta, Chattanooga	I-75 exit 328
	0.7	1.1	US 41 / SR 3 (South Dixie Highway / South Dalton Bypass) – Resaca, Calhoun, Dalton	Eastern terminus
1.000 mi = 1.609 km; 1.000 km = 0.621 mi
