= Georgia State Route 300 =

Highway in Georgia, United States

State Route 300
- Georgia-Florida Parkway
- SR 300; mainline in red, connector route in blue

Route information
- Maintained by GDOT
- Length: 106.67 mi (171.67 km)
- Existed: 1983–present

Major junctions
- South end: US 19 / SR 3 / SR 57 at Florida state line south-southeast of Thomasville
- US 84 / US 319 / SR 35 / SR 38 / SR 122 / SR 3 Alt. / SR 35 Conn. in Thomasville; SR 37 / SR 112 in Camilla; US 19 / US 82 / SR 3 / SR 133 / SR 520 in Albany; US 41 / SR 7 south of Cordele
- North end: I-75 in Cordele

Location
- Country: United States
- State: Georgia
- Counties: Thomas, Mitchell, Dougherty, Worth, Crisp

Highway system
- Georgia State Highway System; Interstate; US; State; Special
← SR 299	→ US 301

State Route 300 (SR 300, also called the Georgia–Florida Parkway) is a 106.67-mile-long (171.67 km) state highway in the southern part of the U.S. state of Georgia. Its southern terminus is at the Florida state line south-southeast of Thomasville, where the roadway continues as US 19/SR 57. This is also the southern terminus of SR 3, with which US 19 and SR 300 travel concurrently through the southern part of the state. Its northern terminus is at Interstate 75 (I-75) in Cordele. It bears no relation to the pre-1983 highway in Central Georgia.

This is the second state route in Georgia to carry the SR 300 designation. The earlier one, in a different part of the state, was much shorter, traveling from Monticello to a point 20.3 miles (32.7 km) northeast of Monticello (and about 6 miles (9.7 km) north of Eatonton), and existed from the 1960s to the 1980s.

== Route description ==
=== Florida to Albany ===
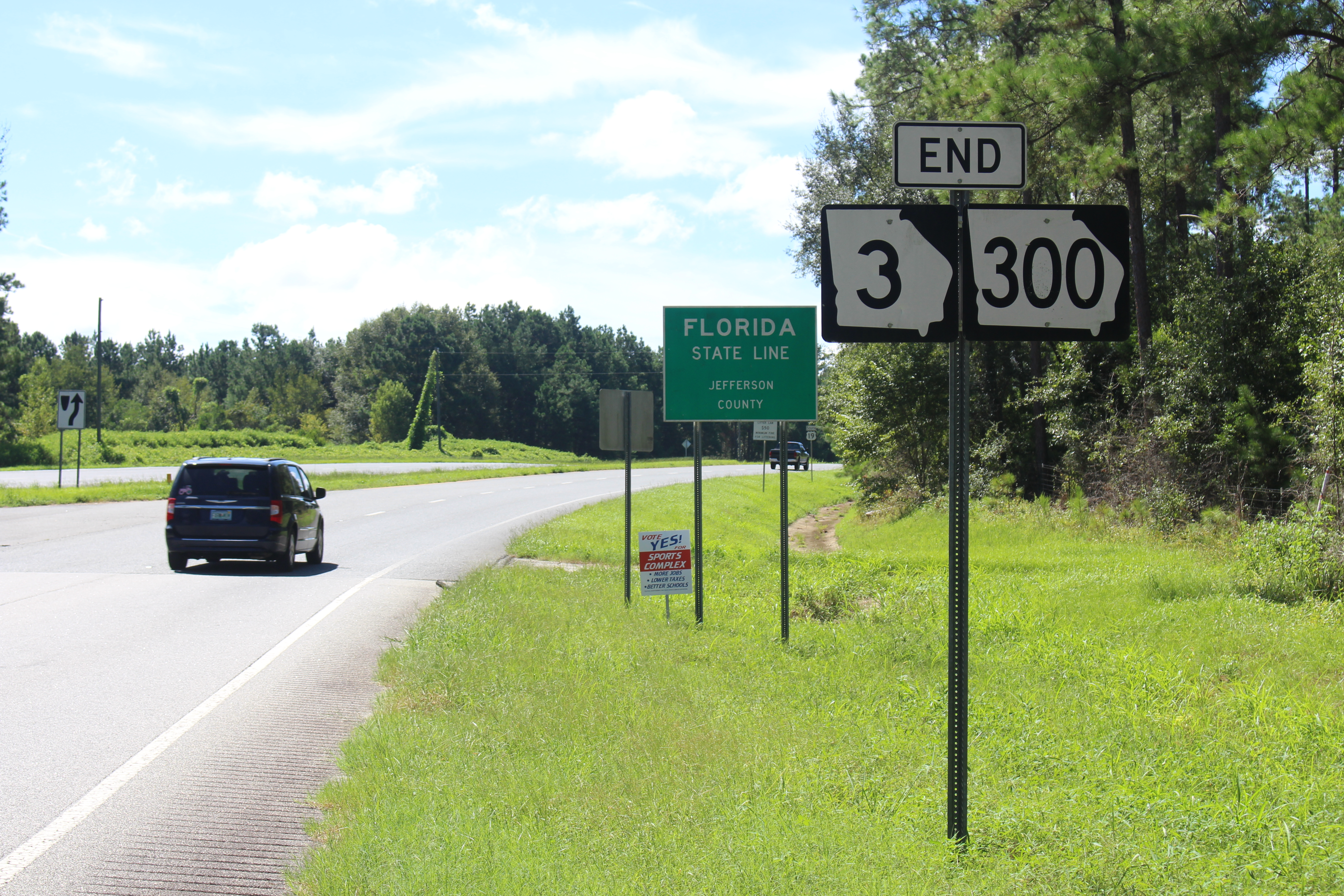
Southern terminus of SR 3/SR 300 at the FL state line.

SR 300 begins at the Florida state line, where it is concurrent with US 19. On the Florida side of the state line, US 19 is concurrent with Florida State Road 57 (SR 57, which is unsigned), and is known as the Florida–Georgia Parkway. At the state line, SR 3 and SR 300 begin. US 19/SR 3/SR 300 head northwest until they enter Thomasville. In the city, they intersect US 84/SR 38, which head east to Valdosta. Here, they join the concurrency. Also, this intersection marks the eastern terminus of US 84 Business/SR 38 Business. Farther to the northwest, the five routes intersect US 319/SR 35, where US 84/SR 38 depart to the west, along with SR 3 Alternate (SR 3 Alt.). In Meigs, SR 111 intersects the concurrency, along with the northern terminus of SR 3 Alt. In Camilla, the highways have intersections with SR 37 and SR 112, and curve to make a slight jog to the northeast until they reach Albany.

=== Albany to Cordele ===
Most of the route of SR 300 in Albany is on the Liberty Expressway, a freeway-grade bypass of the city's downtown to the northeast. In the southeastern part of the city is an intersection with SR 133, which joins the concurrency, and the eastern terminus of SR 234. Nearly 2 miles (3.2 km) later, the concurrency intersects US 19 Bus./US 82 Bus./SR 520 Bus., where US 19 Bus. has its southern terminus. Slightly later is US 82/SR 520. They join the US 19/SR 3/SR 133 concurrency, while US 82/SR 300/SR 520 head east for just over 1.5 miles (2.4 km), where SR 300 splits off to the northeast. It travels through rural areas until it reaches the Cordele area. Just before entering Cordele proper is SR 300 Connector and US 41/SR 7. Upon entering Cordele, the route meets its northern terminus, an interchange with I-75.

== History ==
=== 1920s ===
The roadway that would eventually become the current SR 300 was established in 1920 as SR 3 from Thomasville to Albany, via Camilla. By October 1926, nearly all of the aforementioned route was paved. By October 1929, SR 3 was extended southwest to where US 319 currently crosses the state line. US 19 was designated along this route to Thomasville, and then its current route from Thomasville to Albany. SR 35 was designated along a portion of highway that is the current route of US 19 from the Florida state line to Thomasville.

=== 1930s ===
By 1935, nearly all of the northern half of the section of SR 35 between the Florida state line and Thomasville was paved. Prior to the beginning of 1936, nearly all of that section of SR 35 was paved. By July, the rest of that section was paved. In March 1937, the section of SR 300 that currently travels from Albany to Cordele was established as a northern extension of SR 133. By October the routings of the portions of US 19 southwest of Thomasville was shifted to its current routing, while SR 3 stayed on its original routing. The following August, a small portion of SR 133 southwest of Cordele was paved.

=== 1940s ===
By 1944, a very brief section of SR 133 northeast of Albany was paved. In early 1946, approximately half of the length of SR 133 between Warwick and Cordele was paved. In early 1948, all of SR 133 was redesignated as SR 257. The section of SR 257 from Albany to the intersection with SR 32 and the section from Lake Blackshear to Cordele were paved. In 1950, nearly all of SR 257 was paved.

=== 1950s to 1980s ===
By 1952, the entire roadway that would eventually become SR 300 was paved. A section of the highway from Albany to Cordele was proposed as Interstate 175 and then cancelled, but in early 1982, the Georgia–Florida Parkway was approved to be designated along the entire stretch of what is now SR 300. By the next year, all of SR 257 was redesignated as SR 300 and the designation was applied to the rest of its current route. Later that year, the routings of SR 3 and SR 35 south of Thomasville were swapped.

== Major intersections ==
County	Location	mi	km	Destinations	Notes
Thomas		0.000	0.000	US 19 south (Florida–Georgia Parkway / SR 57) / SR 3 begins	Southern terminus of SR 3/SR 300 at the Florida state line; southern end of US 19 and SR 3 concurrencies
Thomas	Thomasville	12.453	20.041	US 84 Bus. west / SR 38 Bus. west (Smith Avenue) / US 84 east / SR 38 east	Eastern terminus of US 84 Bus./SR 38 Bus.; southern end of US 84/SR 38 concurrency
Thomas	Thomasville	13.720	22.080	SR 122 east (Pavo Road) – Pavo	Western terminus of SR 122
Thomas	Thomasville	14.195	22.845	SR 35 Conn. north (East Jackson Street) – Thomasville, Moultrie	Southern terminus of SR 35 Conn.; former northern terminus of US 319 Bus.
Thomas	Thomasville	15.294	24.613	US 84 west / US 319 / SR 3 Alt. north / SR 35 / SR 38 west (Thomasville Bypass)	Northern end of US 84/SR 38 concurrency; southern terminus of SR 3 Alt.
Thomas		17.678	28.450	SR 202 north	Southern terminus of SR 202
Thomas	Ochlocknee	24.026	38.666	SR 188 (Willow Street) – Cairo, Coolidge	
Thomas		31.342	50.440	SR 3 Alt. south / SR 111 (East Depot Street)	Northern terminus of SR 3 Alt.
Mitchell	Pelham	36.829	59.271	SR 93 (Cotton Road NE) – Cairo, Sale City	
Mitchell	Camilla	44.970	72.372	SR 37 (East Broad Street) – Newton, Moultrie	
Mitchell	Camilla	45.072	72.536	SR 112 (East Oakland Avenue) – Cairo, Moultrie	
Mitchell	Baconton	55.727	89.684	SR 93 south – Sale City	Northern terminus of SR 93
Dougherty	Albany	67.657	108.883	SR 133 south / SR 234 west (Moultrie Road) – Moultrie	Southern end of SR 133 concurrency; eastern terminus of SR 234
Dougherty	Albany	69.442	111.756	US 19 Bus. north / US 82 Bus. / SR 520 Bus. (East Oglethorpe Boulevard)	Southern terminus of US 19 Bus.
Dougherty	Albany	70.015	112.678	US 19 north / US 82 west / SR 3 north / SR 133 north / SR 520 west (Liberty Expressway)	Northern end of US 19/SR 3 and SR 133 concurrencies; southern end of US 82/SR 520 concurrency
Dougherty	Albany	71.424	114.946	US 82 east / SR 520 east (Clark Avenue)	Northern end of US 82/SR 520 concurrency
Worth		83.858	134.956	SR 32 – Leesburg, Ashburn	
Worth	Warwick	92.307	148.554	SR 313 south (Main Street NW) – Sylvester	Northern terminus of SR 313
Crisp		100.641	161.966	SR 300 Conn. north (Old Albany Highway) – Cordele	Southern terminus of SR 300 Conn.
Crisp		104.921	168.854	US 41 / SR 7 – Arabi, Ashburn, Cordele	
Crisp	Cordele	106.669	171.667	I-75 (SR 401) to US 280 – Valdosta, Macon, Abbeville	Northern terminus; I-75 exit 99
1.000 mi = 1.609 km; 1.000 km = 0.621 mi: Concurrency terminus

== Cordele connector route ==
State Route 300 Connector
- Location: Southwest of Cordele
- Length: 3.31 mi (5.33 km)

State Route 300 Connector (SR 300 Conn.) is a 3.31-mile-long (5.33 km) connector route of the SR 300 mainline that exists entirely within Crisp County. It follows Old Albany Highway from an intersection with SR 300 southwest of Cordele and travels northeast until it meets its northern terminus, an intersection with US 280/SR 30 west of the city.

The entire route is in Crisp County.

Location	mi	km	Destinations	Notes
	0.000	0.000	SR 300 – Albany, Cordele	Southern terminus
	3.312	5.330	US 280 / SR 30	Northern terminus
1.000 mi = 1.609 km; 1.000 km = 0.621 mi
