= Calvary, Georgia =

- Unincorporated community Census-designated place
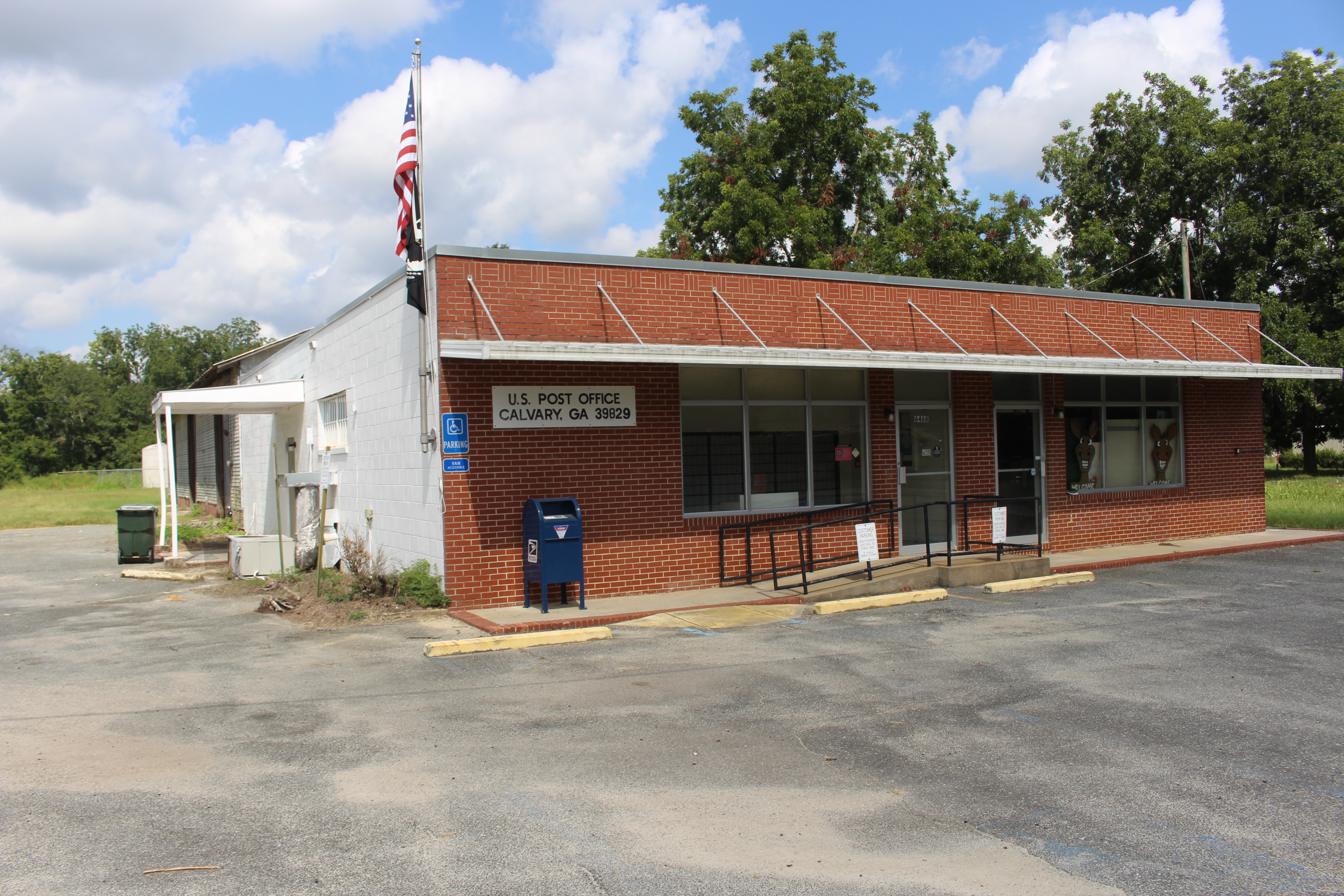
- Post office in Calvary

- Location within Georgia Location within the United States
- Coordinates: 30°43′36″N 84°20′58″W
- Country: United States
- State: Georgia
- County: Grady

Area
  - Total: 1.57 sq mi (4.07 km^{2})
  - Land: 1.54 sq mi (3.98 km^{2})
  - Water: 0.035 sq mi (0.09 km^{2})
- Elevation: 260 ft (79 m)

Population (2020)
  - Total: 129
  - Density: 83.9/sq mi (32.4/km^{2})
- Time zone: UTC-5 (Eastern (EST))
  - Summer (DST): UTC-4 (EDT)
- ZIP code: 39829
- Area code: 229
- FIPS code: 13-12484
- GNIS feature ID: 0354940

Calvary is a census-designated place and unincorporated community in Grady County, Georgia, United States. As of 2020, its population was 129. It is located along Georgia State Route 111, 15 miles (24 km) southwest of Cairo, the Grady County seat. Tallahassee, Florida, is 23 miles (37 km) to the south.

Agriculture is an important part of the local economy. The top crops in the county are cotton, corn and peanuts, while chickens are overwhelmingly the most important livestock. Hurricane Michael struck the region on Wednesday, October 10, 2018, causing catastrophic damage to agriculture.

== History ==
The area where Calvary is located was settled circa 1835–1836 by emigrants from Sampson County, North Carolina. Settlers claimed they chose the area after hearing claims that the soil was similar to their home county, and so would support similar crops. The community was referred to by some as the North Carolina settlement after these Carolina settlers.

A.J. Johnson's 1863 "Map of Georgia and Alabama" does not identify Calvary by name, but an 1883 Map of Georgia by Georgia Franklin Cram does identify Calvary in Decatur County. In 1910 the community is labeled Calvary on the "Rand McNally Map of Georgia."

On 15 June 1869 Harrison Fairbanks was named Postmaster in Calvary, Georgia (then part of Decatur County). Grady County, including Calvary, was founded from parts of Decatur County and Thomas County on August 17, 1905.

== Demographics ==
Historical population
Census	Pop.	Note	%±
2010	161		—
2020	129		−19.9%
U.S. Decennial Census; 1850-1870 1870-1880; 1890-1910 1920-1930; 1940 1950 1960; 1970 1980 1990; 2000 2010 2020

The U.S. Census Bureau identifies Calvary as a census-designated place, roughly equivalent to an incorporated place, for the purposes of statistics. Calvary was first listed as a CDP in the 2010 U.S. census.

=== 2020 census ===
Calvary CDP, Georgia – Racial and ethnic composition Note: the US Census treats Hispanic/Latino as an ethnic category. This table excludes Latinos from the racial categories and assigns them to a separate category. Hispanics/Latinos may be of any race.
Race / Ethnicity (NH = Non-Hispanic)	Pop 2010	Pop 2020	% 2010	% 2020
White alone (NH)	123	103	76.40%	79.84%
Black or African American alone (NH)	14	12	8.70%	9.30%
Native American or Alaska Native alone (NH)	1	0	0.62%	0.00%
Asian alone (NH)	0	0	0.00%	0.00%
Pacific Islander alone (NH)	0	0	0.00%	0.00%
Some Other Race alone (NH)	0	0	0.00%	0.00%
Mixed Race or Multi-Racial (NH)	2	0	1.24%	0.00%
Hispanic or Latino (any race)	21	14	13.04%	10.85%
Total	161	129	100.00%	100.00%

As of 2020, its population was 129.

The estimated 2017 median income was $85,893 and the mean income was $70,773 for a household in Calvary from the 2013-2017 American Community Survey 5 Year Estimates.
