= Georgia State Route 308 =

Highway in Georgia, United States

State Route 308
- SR 308 highlighted in red

Route information
- Maintained by GDOT
- Length: 11.4 mi (18.3 km)

Major junctions
- West end: US 19 / SR 3 northwest of Smithville
- SR 49 southeast of Plains
- East end: SR 45 in Plains

Location
- Country: United States
- State: Georgia
- County: Sumter

Highway system
- Georgia State Highway System; Interstate; US; State; Special
← SR 307	→ SR 309

State Route 308 (SR 308) is a northwest-southeast state highway located in the southwest part of the U.S. state of Georgia. Its route is entirely within Sumter County.

== Route description ==
SR 308 begins at an intersection with SR 45 in the southwestern part of Plains. The route heads southeast out of the city along South Bond Street. It continues southeast through rural portions of the county, passing Salters Mill Road. Farther along, it has an intersection with SR 49. The highway continues southeast, and then turns easterly until it meets its eastern terminus, an intersection with US 19/SR 3 northwest of Smithville.

== Major intersections ==
The entire route is in Sumter County.

Location	mi	km	Destinations	Notes
Plains	0.0	0.0	SR 45 (Botsford Road / South Bond Street) – Dawson, Friendship	Western terminus; SR 45 south runs along Botsford Road; SR 45 north runs along South Bond Street.
	6.4	10.3	SR 49 (Americus Dawson Road) – Dawson, Americus	
	11.4	18.3	US 19 south (South Martin Luther King Boulevard) / SR 3 south – Albany	
	11.4	18.3	US 19 north (South Martin Luther King Boulevard) / SR 3 – Americus	Eastern terminus
1.000 mi = 1.609 km; 1.000 km = 0.621 mi
