= Georgia State Route 188 =

State highway in Georgia, United States

State Route 188
- Georgia State Route 188 highlighted in red

Route information
- Maintained by GDOT
- Length: 35.2 mi (56.6 km)

Major junctions
- West end: SR 93 in Cairo
- US 84 / SR 38 in Cairo; US 19 / SR 3 / SR 300 in Ochlocknee; US 319 / SR 35 in Coolidge
- East end: SR 33 northwest of Pavo

Location
- Country: United States
- State: Georgia
- Counties: Grady, Thomas

Highway system
- Georgia State Highway System; Interstate; US; State; Special
← SR 187	→ SR 189

State Route 188 (SR 188) is a 35.2-mile-long (56.6 km) state highway that runs west-to-east through portions of Grady and Thomas counties in the southwestern part of the U.S. state of Georgia.

== Route description ==
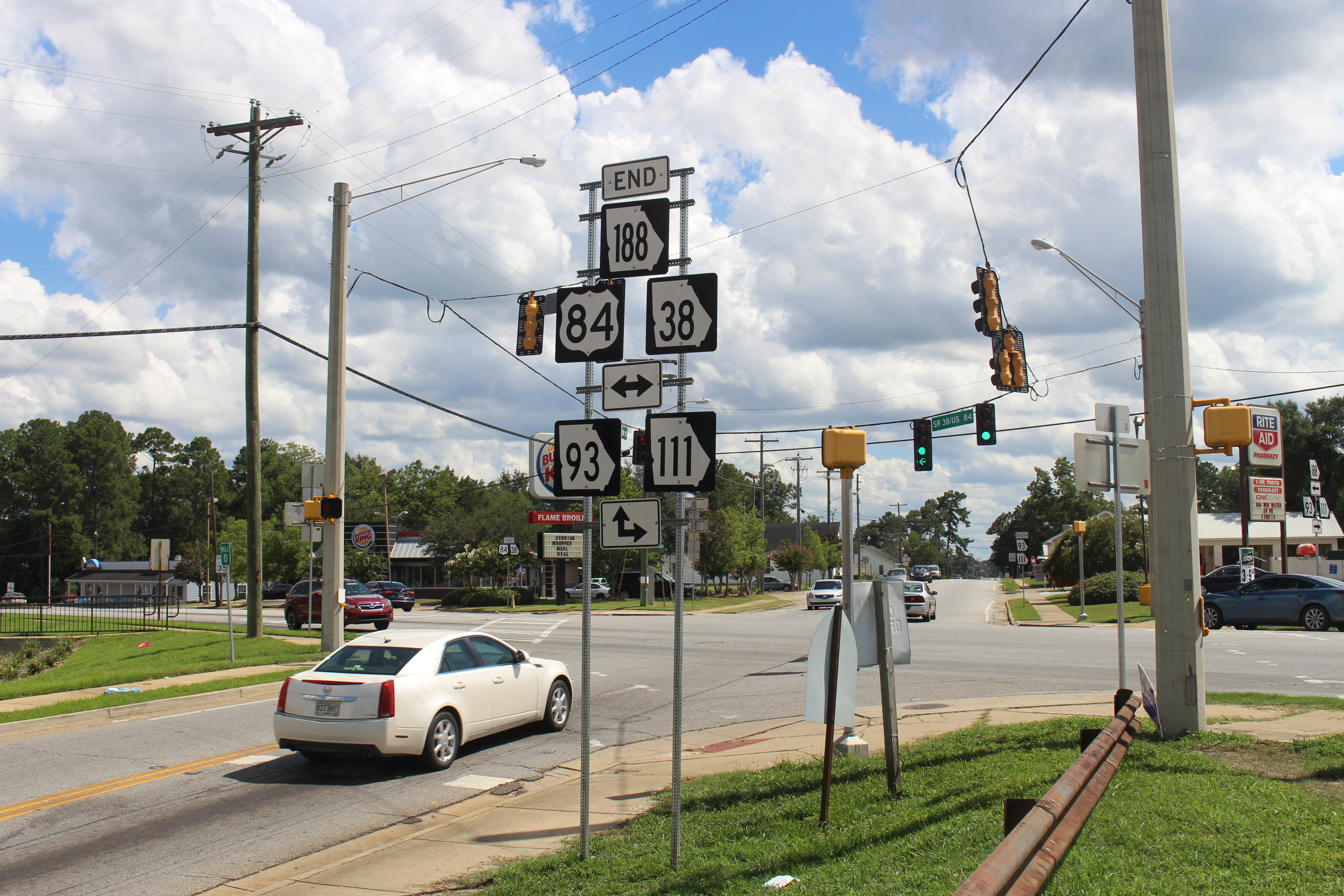
Western terminus in Cairo

SR 188 begins at an intersection with SR 93 in Cairo, in Grady County. It heads north through town to an intersection with SR 38 Spur (1st Avenue NE). It continues north to meet US 84/SR 38, before leaving Cairo. It stair-steps its way to the northeast to meet SR 3 Alternate (Main Street) in Ochlocknee. It crosses into Thomas County on its way. On the eastern edge of town is an intersection with US 19/SR 3/SR 300. Farther to the east is a concurrency with SR 202. In Coolidge, the highway intersects US 319/SR 35 (Pine Street). SR 188 continues to the southeast and curves to the east to meet its eastern terminus, an intersection with SR 33 northwest to Pavo.

SR 188 is not part of the National Highway System, a system of roadways important to the nation's economy, defense, and mobility.

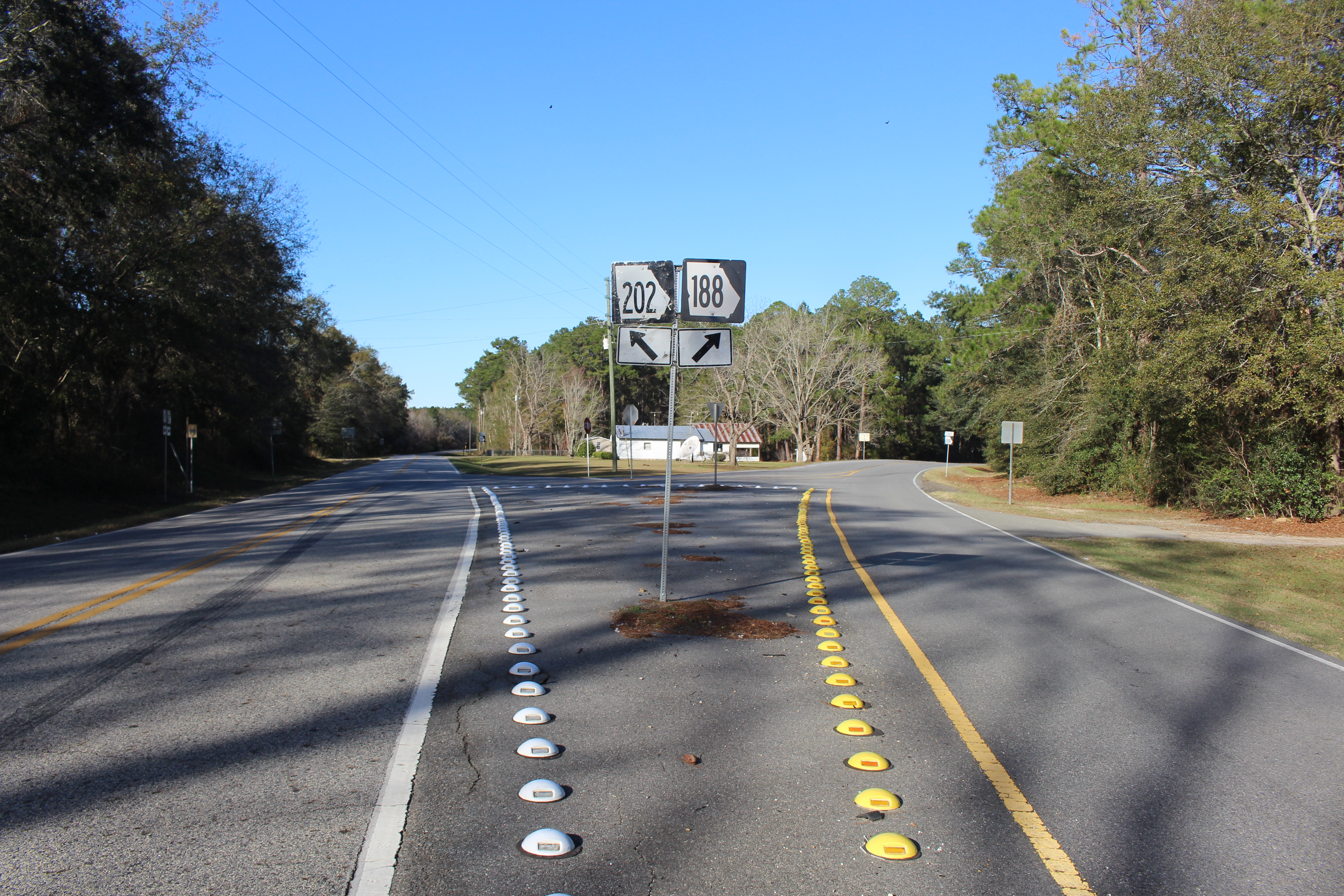
SR 188 202 split, Thomas County

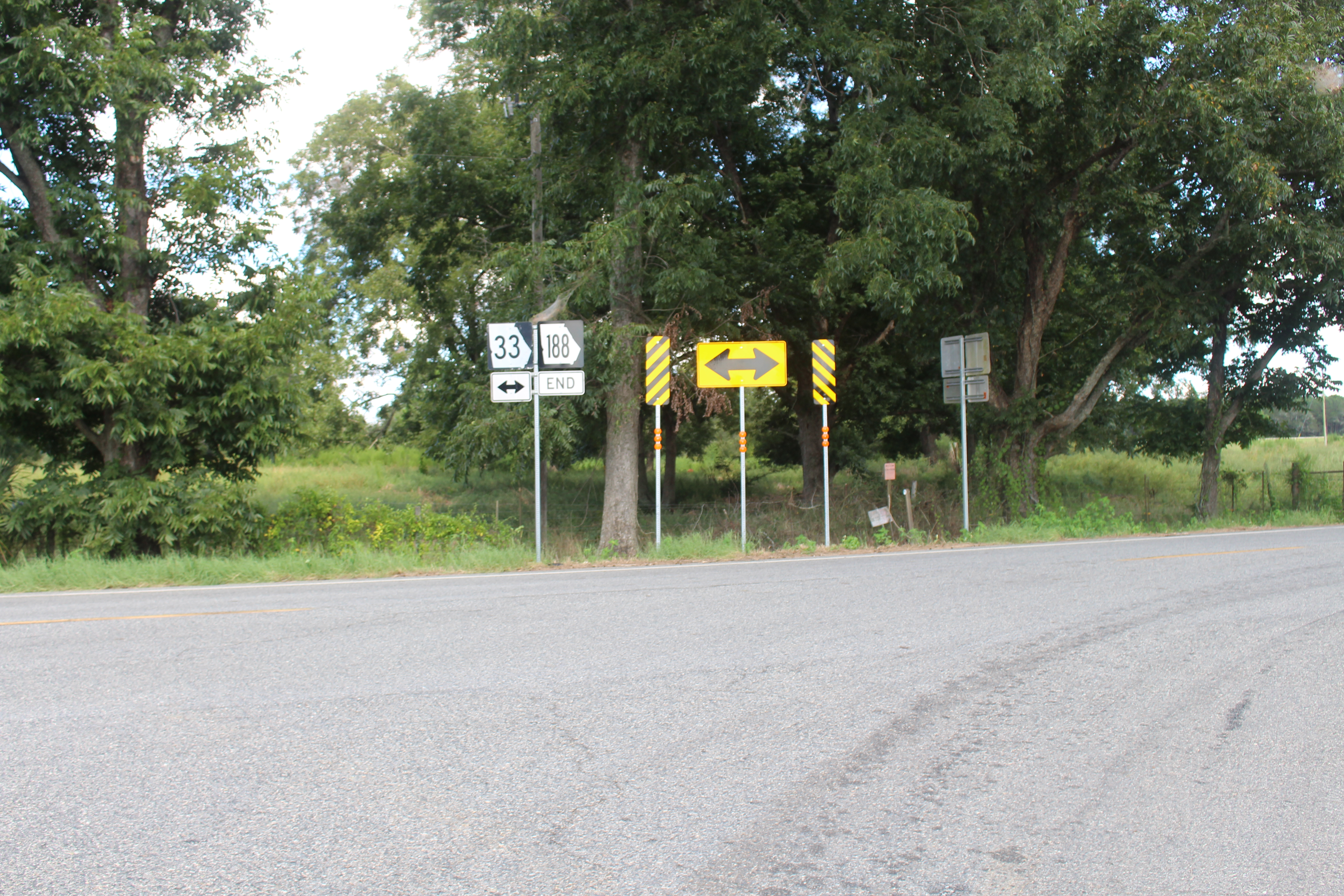
Eastern terminus near Pavo

== Major intersections ==
County	Location	mi	km	Destinations	Notes
Grady	Cairo	0.0	0.0	SR 93 (5th Street SE/4th Avenue SE) – Beachton, Pelham	Western terminus
Grady	Cairo	0.3	0.48	SR 38 Spur (1st Avenue NE)	
Grady	Cairo	0.7	1.1	US 84 / SR 38 (38th Boulevard NE)	
Thomas	Ochlocknee	14.4	23.2	SR 3 Alt. (main Street) – Thomasville, Meigs	
Thomas	Ochlocknee	15.5	24.9	US 19 / SR 3 / SR 300	
Thomas		20.2	32.5	SR 202 south – Thomasville	Western end of SR 202 concurrency
Thomas		21.2	34.1	SR 202 north	Eastern end of SR 202 concurrency
Thomas	Coolidge	27.6	44.4	US 319 (North Pine Street) / SR 35	
Thomas		35.2	56.6	SR 33 – Pavo, Moultrie	Eastern terminus
1.000 mi = 1.609 km; 1.000 km = 0.621 mi: Concurrency terminus
