= Riverside, Colquitt County, Georgia =

Riverside, Georgia
- Town
- Location in Colquitt County and the state of Georgia
- Coordinates: 31°10′43″N 83°48′18″W
- Country: United States
- State: Georgia
- County: Colquitt

Area
  - Total: 0.23 sq mi (0.6 km^{2})
  - Land: 0.23 sq mi (0.6 km^{2})
  - Water: 0 sq mi (0 km^{2})
- Elevation: 279 ft (85 m)

Population (2010)
  - Total: 35
  - Estimate (2016): 35
  - Density: 150/sq mi (58/km^{2})
- Time zone: UTC-5 (Eastern (EST))
  - Summer (DST): UTC-4 (EDT)
- FIPS code: 13-65604
- GNIS feature ID: 0332869

Riverside was a town in Colquitt County, Georgia, United States. The population was 35 at the 2010 census. Riverside surrendered its municipal charter effective August 18, 2016, due to low population.

== History ==
The community was named for its riverside setting on the Ochlockonee River. The Georgia General Assembly incorporated Riverside as a town in 1907.

== Geography ==
Riverside was located at 31°10′43″N 83°48′18″W (31.178587, -83.805121).

According to the United States Census Bureau, the town had a total area of 0.2 square miles (0.52 km^{2}), all land.

== Demographics ==
Historical population
Census	Pop.	Note	%±
1910	170		—
1920	249		46.5%
1930	294		18.1%
1940	307		4.4%
1950	395		28.7%
1960	329		−16.7%
1970	114		−65.3%
1980	99		−13.2%
1990	74		−25.3%
2000	57		−23.0%
2010	35		−38.6%
2016 (est.)	35		0.0%
U.S. Decennial Census

As of the census of 2000, there were 57 people, 20 households, and 16 families residing in the town. The population density was 263.7 inhabitants per square mile (101.8/km^{2}). There were 26 housing units at an average density of 120.3 units per square mile (46.4 units/km^{2}). The racial makeup of the town was 98.25% White, and 1.75% from two or more races.

There were 20 households, out of which 50.0% had children under the age of 18 living with them, 60.0% were married couples living together, 15.0% had a female householder with no husband present, and 20.0% were non-families. 15.0% of all households were made up of individuals, and 10.0% had someone living alone who was 65 years of age or older. The average household size was 2.85 and the average family size was 3.19.

In the town, the population was spread out, with 29.8% under the age of 18, 10.5% from 18 to 24, 38.6% from 25 to 44, 15.8% from 45 to 64, and 5.3% who were 65 years of age or older. The median age was 29 years. For every 100 females, there were 62.9 males. For every 100 females age 18 and over, there were 90.5 males.

The median income for a household in the town was $28,125, and the median income for a family was $35,000. Males had a median income of $27,917 versus $14,063 for females. The per capita income for the town was $10,102. There were 25.0% of families and 29.0% of the population living below the poverty line, including 44.0% of under eighteens and none of those over 64.
