= Thomas County, Georgia =

County in Georgia, United States

- County
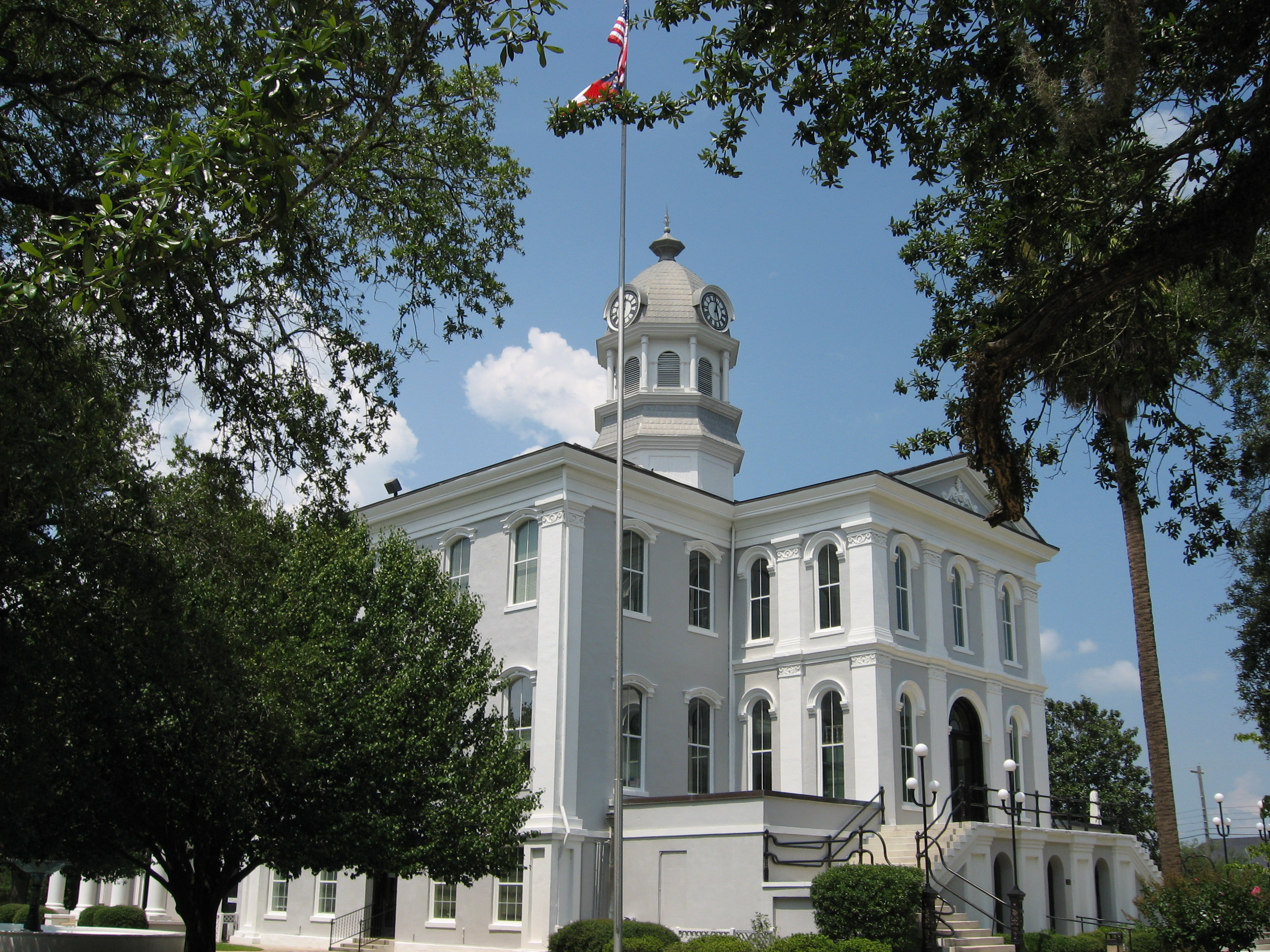
- Former Thomas County Courthouse in Thomasville

- Location within the U.S. state of Georgia
- Coordinates: 30°52′N 83°55′W
- Country: United States
- State: Georgia
- Founded: December 23, 1825; 200 years ago
- Named for: Jett Thomas
- Seat: Thomasville
- Largest city: Thomasville

Area
  - Total: 552 sq mi (1,430 km^{2})
  - Land: 545 sq mi (1,410 km^{2})
  - Water: 7.6 sq mi (20 km^{2}) 1.4%

Population (2020)
  - Total: 45,798
  - Estimate (2025): 46,368 ▲
  - Density: 84.0/sq mi (32.4/km^{2})
- Time zone: UTC−5 (Eastern)
  - Summer (DST): UTC−4 (EDT)
- Congressional district: 8th
- Website: www.thomascountyboc.org

Thomas County is a county located in the U.S. state of Georgia. As of the 2020 census, the population was 45,798. The county seat is Thomasville. Thomas County comprises the Thomasville, GA micropolitan statistical area.

== History ==
Thomas County was created by an act of the Georgia General Assembly on December 23, 1825, from portions of Decatur and Irwin Counties. Colquitt (1856), Brooks (1858), and Grady (1905) Counties all were formed partially from lands within Thomas County's original borders.

The county is named for Jett Thomas, an officer in the War of 1812 who is also known for overseeing the construction of the first building at the University of Georgia (originally referred to as Franklin College and known today as Old College) as well as the state capital at Milledgeville.

== Geography ==
According to the U.S. Census Bureau, the county has a total area of 552 square miles (1,430 km^{2}), of which 545 square miles (1,410 km^{2}) is land and 7.6 square miles (20 km^{2}) (1.4%) is water.

The northwestern half of Thomas County, bordered by U.S. Route 319 southwest of Thomasville, and a line that ends up bisecting the distance between Coolidge and Pavo in the northeast, is located in the Upper Ochlockonee River sub-basin of the larger Ochlockonee River basin. The northeastern edge of the county, from north of Pavo to Boston, is located in the Withlacoochee River sub-basin of the Suwannee River basin. The southeastern portion of Thomas County, running southeast from Thomasville, is located in the Aucilla River sub-basin of the larger Aucilla-Waccasassa basin. Almost all of the southwestern portion of the county is located in the Apalachee Bay-St. Marks sub-basin of the Ochlockonee River basin, except for the tiny southwesternmost corner, which is located in the Lower Ochlockonee River sub-basin of the same Ochlockonee River basin.

The Aucilla River rises in Thomas County. The Red Hills Region is centered on Thomas County.

=== Major highways ===
- U.S. Route 19 / State Route 3 / State Route 300
  - State Route 3 Alternate
- U.S. Route 84 / State Route 38
  - U.S. Route 84 Business / State Route 38 Business
- U.S. Route 319 State Route 35
  - State Route 35 Connector
- State Route 33
- State Route 111
- State Route 122
- State Route 188
- State Route 202

=== Adjacent counties ===
- Colquitt County - northeast
- Brooks County - east
- Jefferson County, Florida - south
- Leon County, Florida - southwest
- Grady County - west
- Mitchell County - northwest

== Communities ==
=== Cities ===
- Barwick (partly in Brooks County)
- Boston
- Coolidge
- Meigs (partly in Mitchell County)
- Pavo (partly in Brooks County)
- Thomasville

=== Town ===
- Ochlocknee

=== Unincorporated community ===
- Metcalfe
- Quality, Georgia Quality

== Demographics ==
Historical population
Census	Pop.	Note	%±
1830	3,299		—
1840	6,766		105.1%
1850	10,103		49.3%
1860	10,766		6.6%
1870	14,523		34.9%
1880	20,597		41.8%
1890	26,154		27.0%
1900	31,076		18.8%
1910	29,071		−6.5%
1920	33,044		13.7%
1930	32,612		−1.3%
1940	31,289		−4.1%
1950	33,932		8.4%
1960	34,319		1.1%
1970	34,515		0.6%
1980	38,098		10.4%
1990	38,986		2.3%
2000	42,737		9.6%
2010	44,720		4.6%
2020	45,798		2.4%
2025 (est.)	46,368	▲	1.2%
U.S. Decennial Census; 1790-1880 1890-1910; 1920-1930 1930-1940; 1940-1950 1960-1980; 1980-2000 2010

=== Racial and ethnic composition ===
Thomas County, Georgia – Racial and ethnic composition Note: the US Census treats Hispanic/Latino as an ethnic category. This table excludes Latinos from the racial categories and assigns them to a separate category. Hispanics/Latinos may be of any race.
Race / Ethnicity (NH = Non-Hispanic)	Pop 1980	Pop 1990	Pop 2000	Pop 2010	Pop 2020	% 1980	% 1990	% 2000	% 2010	% 2020
White alone (NH)	23,234	23,816	24,875	26,081	25,994	60.98%	61.09%	58.20%	58.32%	56.76%
Black or African American alone (NH)	14,358	14,719	16,497	16,416	16,259	37.69%	37.75%	38.60%	36.71%	35.50%
Native American or Alaska Native alone (NH)	50	93	116	166	150	0.13%	0.24%	0.27%	0.37%	0.33%
Asian alone (NH)	43	62	172	306	406	0.11%	0.16%	0.40%	0.68%	0.89%
Native Hawaiian or Pacific Islander alone (NH)	x	x	14	7	9	x	x	0.03%	0.02%	0.02%
Other race alone (NH)	35	7	26	49	124	0.09%	0.02%	0.06%	0.11%	0.27%
Mixed race or Multiracial (NH)	x	x	303	420	1,279	x	x	0.71%	0.94%	2.79%
Hispanic or Latino (any race)	378	289	734	1,275	1,577	0.99%	0.74%	1.72%	2.85%	3.44%
Total	38,098	38,986	42,737	44,720	45,798	100.00%	100.00%	100.00%	100.00%	100.00%

=== 2020 census ===
As of the 2020 census, the county had a population of 45,798 in 18,440 households, including 12,161 families.

The median age was 40.8 years. 23.5% of residents were under the age of 18, and 19.0% of residents were 65 years of age or older. For every 100 female,s there were 90.0 males, and for every 100 females age 18 and over, there were 85.6 males age 18 and over.

55.1% of residents lived in urban areas, while 44.9% lived in rural areas.

The racial makeup of the county was 57.6% White, 35.7% Black or African American, 0.4% American Indian and Alaska Native, 0.9% Asian, 0.0% Native Hawaiian and Pacific Islander, 1.6% from some other race, and 3.8% from two or more races. Hispanic or Latino residents of any race comprised 3.4% of the population.

Among those households, 30.6% had children under the age of 18 living with them, and 34.1% had a female householder with no spouse or partner present. About 29.1% of all households were made up of individuals, and 13.4% had someone living alone who was 65 years of age or older.

There were 20,668 housing units, of which 10.8% were vacant. Among occupied housing units, 63.5% were owner-occupied, and 36.5% were renter-occupied. The homeowner vacancy rate was 1.6%, and the rental vacancy rate was 6.3%.

== Education ==
Colleges and universities:

- Thomas University
- Southern Regional Technical College

There are two school districts:

- Thomasville City School District (areas in Thomasville City)
- Thomas County School District (areas not in Thomasville City)

Private schools:

- Brookwood School

== Politics ==
United States presidential election results for Thomas County, Georgia
Year	Republican		Democratic		Third party(ies)	
Year	No.	%	No.	%	No.	%
1912	50	4.13%	1,012	83.50%	150	12.38%
1916	42	2.78%	1,298	85.79%	173	11.43%
1920	168	12.94%	1,130	87.06%	0	0.00%
1924	115	7.86%	1,280	87.49%	68	4.65%
1928	814	39.63%	1,240	60.37%	0	0.00%
1932	90	3.32%	2,607	96.20%	13	0.48%
1936	222	8.39%	2,409	91.08%	14	0.53%
1940	371	15.16%	2,072	84.64%	5	0.20%
1944	557	24.16%	1,747	75.79%	1	0.04%
1948	925	25.22%	1,429	38.97%	1,313	35.81%
1952	2,273	36.40%	3,971	63.60%	0	0.00%
1956	2,240	38.88%	3,522	61.12%	0	0.00%
1960	2,285	41.46%	3,226	58.54%	0	0.00%
1964	6,306	65.94%	3,257	34.06%	0	0.00%
1968	2,261	22.87%	2,585	26.15%	5,039	50.98%
1972	6,668	75.44%	2,171	24.56%	0	0.00%
1976	3,263	34.68%	6,147	65.32%	0	0.00%
1980	4,294	42.26%	5,695	56.05%	172	1.69%
1984	6,427	61.41%	4,039	38.59%	0	0.00%
1988	6,572	64.78%	3,530	34.80%	43	0.42%
1992	5,500	46.03%	4,841	40.52%	1,607	13.45%
1996	5,649	49.04%	5,183	45.00%	686	5.96%
2000	7,093	58.82%	4,862	40.32%	103	0.85%
2004	9,659	61.39%	5,997	38.12%	77	0.49%
2008	10,642	57.54%	7,720	41.74%	132	0.71%
2012	11,156	58.74%	7,653	40.30%	183	0.96%
2016	11,228	59.45%	7,142	37.82%	515	2.73%
2020	12,969	59.28%	8,708	39.80%	200	0.91%
2024	13,670	61.91%	8,347	37.80%	63	0.29%

United States Senate election results for Thomas County, Georgia2
Year	Republican		Democratic		Third party(ies)	
Year	No.	%	No.	%	No.	%
2020	13,020	60.28%	8,158	37.77%	422	1.95%
2020	11,577	60.22%	7,647	39.78%	0	0.00%

United States Senate election results for Thomas County, Georgia3
Year	Republican		Democratic		Third party(ies)	
Year	No.	%	No.	%	No.	%
2020	5,759	27.10%	3,809	17.92%	11,685	54.98%
2020	12,954	59.80%	8,708	40.20%	0	0.00%
2022	10,481	61.01%	6,436	37.46%	263	1.53%
2022	9,432	60.98%	6,036	39.02%	0	0.00%

Georgia Gubernatorial election results for Thomas County
Year	Republican		Democratic		Third party(ies)	
Year	No.	%	No.	%	No.	%
2022	11,062	63.99%	6,138	35.51%	87	0.50%

As of the 2020s, Thomas County is a Republican stronghold, voting 62% for Donald Trump in 2024. Similar to other Georgia counties on the Florida border, Thomas County is reliably Republican in presidential elections, having last voted for a Democrat in 1980 when the Democratic candidate was native Georgian Jimmy Carter. For elections to the United States House of Representatives, Thomas County is part of Georgia's 2nd congressional district, currently represented by Sanford Bishop. For elections to the Georgia State Senate, Thomas County is part of District 11. For elections to the Georgia House of Representatives, Thomas County is part of District 172 and 173.

== See also ==
- National Register of Historic Places listings in Thomas County, Georgia
- List of counties in Georgia
