= Ochlocknee, Georgia =

- Town
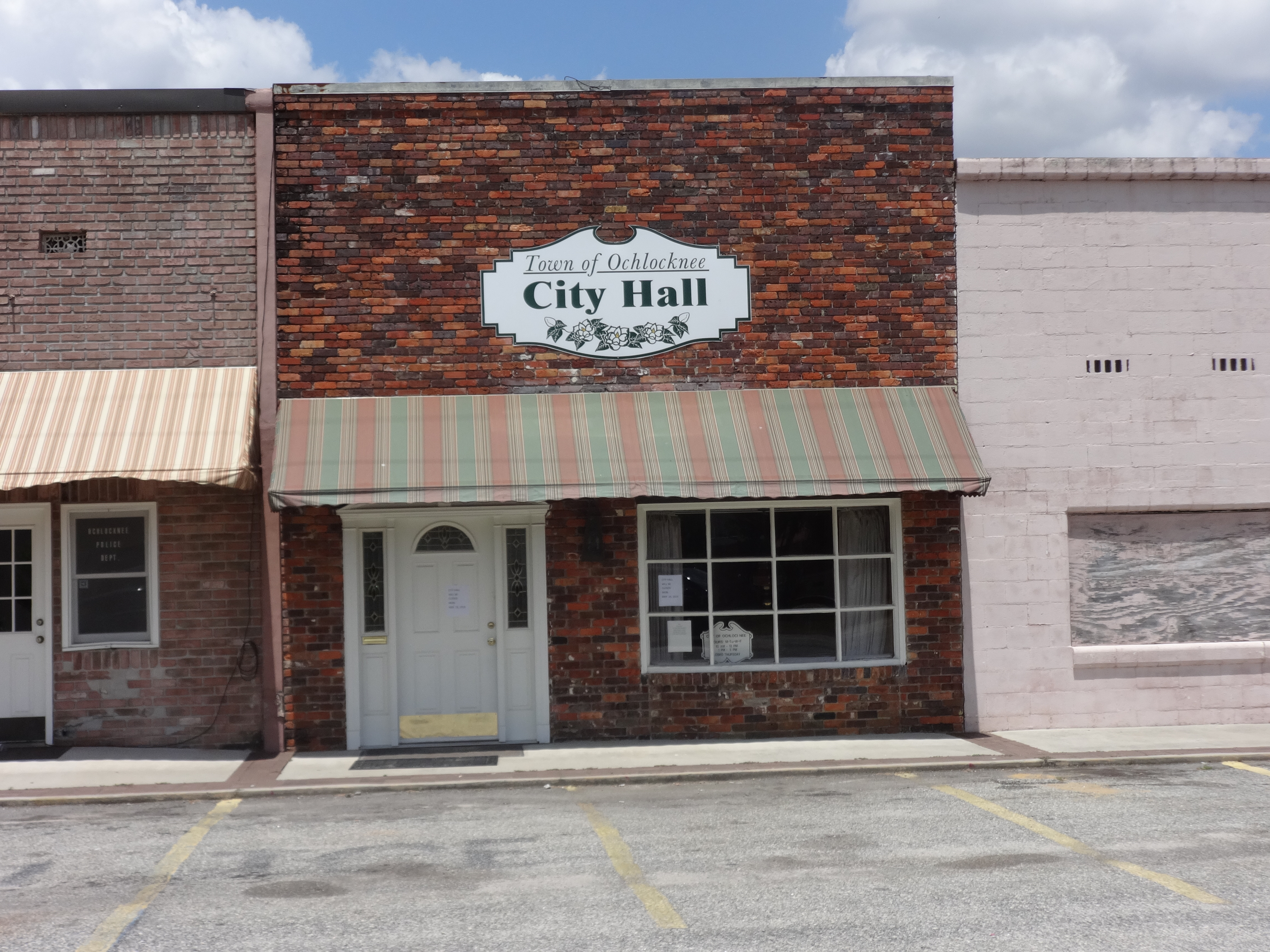
- Ochlocknee City Hall

- Location in Thomas County and the state of Georgia
- Coordinates: 30°58′31″N 84°3′20″W
- Country: United States
- State: Georgia
- County: Thomas

Area
  - Total: 0.95 sq mi (2.47 km^{2})
  - Land: 0.93 sq mi (2.40 km^{2})
  - Water: 0.027 sq mi (0.07 km^{2})
- Elevation: 269 ft (82 m)

Population (2020)
  - Total: 672
  - Density: 725.5/sq mi (280.11/km^{2})
- Time zone: UTC-5 (Eastern (EST))
  - Summer (DST): UTC-4 (EDT)
- ZIP code: 31773
- Area code: 229
- FIPS code: 13-57372
- GNIS feature ID: 0356440
- Website: https://www.ochlockneega.com/

Ochlocknee is a town in Thomas County, Georgia, United States. The population was 672 in 2020. Ochlocknee was incorporated as a town on March 3, 1874 and as a city on January 1, 1970.

== Geography ==
Ochlocknee is located at 30°58′31″N 84°3′20″W (30.975409, -84.055425). According to the United States Census Bureau, the town has a total area of 0.9 square miles (2.3 km^{2}), of which 0.9 square miles (2.3 km^{2}) is land and 1.05% is water.

Major Highways:

• State Route 3 Alternate

• State Route 188

• US Highway 19

• State Route 3

• State Route 300

== Demographics ==
Historical population
Census	Pop.	Note	%±
1880	117		—
1890	202		72.6%
1900	244		20.8%
1910	350		43.4%
1920	410		17.1%
1930	443		8.0%
1940	429		−3.2%
1950	503		17.2%
1960	502		−0.2%
1970	611		21.7%
1980	627		2.6%
1990	588		−6.2%
2000	605		2.9%
2010	676		11.7%
2020	672		−0.6%
U.S. Decennial Census; 1850-1870 1870-1880; 1890-1910 1920-1930; 1940 1950 1960; 1970 1980 1990; 2000 2010

As of the census of 2000, there were 605 people, 230 households, and 164 families residing in the town. By 2020, its population increased to 672.

== Arts and culture ==
The city has celebrated Old South Day, a food and arts and crafts festival, every year since 1976.
