= U.S. Route 19 in Georgia =

Segment of American highway

U.S. Highway 19
- Route of US 19 in Georgia in red

Route information
- Maintained by GDOT
- Length: 349 mi (562 km)

Major junctions
- South end: US 19 at the Florida state line near Thomasville
- US 84 / US 319 / SR 3 Alt. / SR 35 northeast of Thomasville; US 82 / SR 520 in Albany; US 80 / SR 22 southwest of Salem; US 41 / SR 7 / SR 155 in Griffin; I-285 in Forest Park; US 29 / US 41 / US 78 / US 278 / SR 8 in Atlanta; I-285 in Sandy Springs; US 76 / SR 2 / SR 515 in Blairsville
- North end: US 19 / US 129 at the North Carolina state line southwest of Murphy, NC

Location
- Country: United States
- State: Georgia
- Counties: Thomas, Mitchell, Dougherty, Lee, Sumter, Schley, Taylor, Upson, Pike, Spalding, Henry, Clayton, Fulton, Forsyth, Dawson, Lumpkin, Union

Highway system
- United States Numbered Highway System; List; Special; Divided; Georgia State Highway System; Interstate; US; State; Special
← SR 18	→ SR 19

U.S. Highway 19 (US 19) is a 349-mile-long (562 km) United States Numbered Highway in the U.S. state of Georgia. It travels from the Florida state line south-southeast of Thomasville through Albany and Atlanta, to the North Carolina state line at a point north of Lake Nottely.

== Route description ==
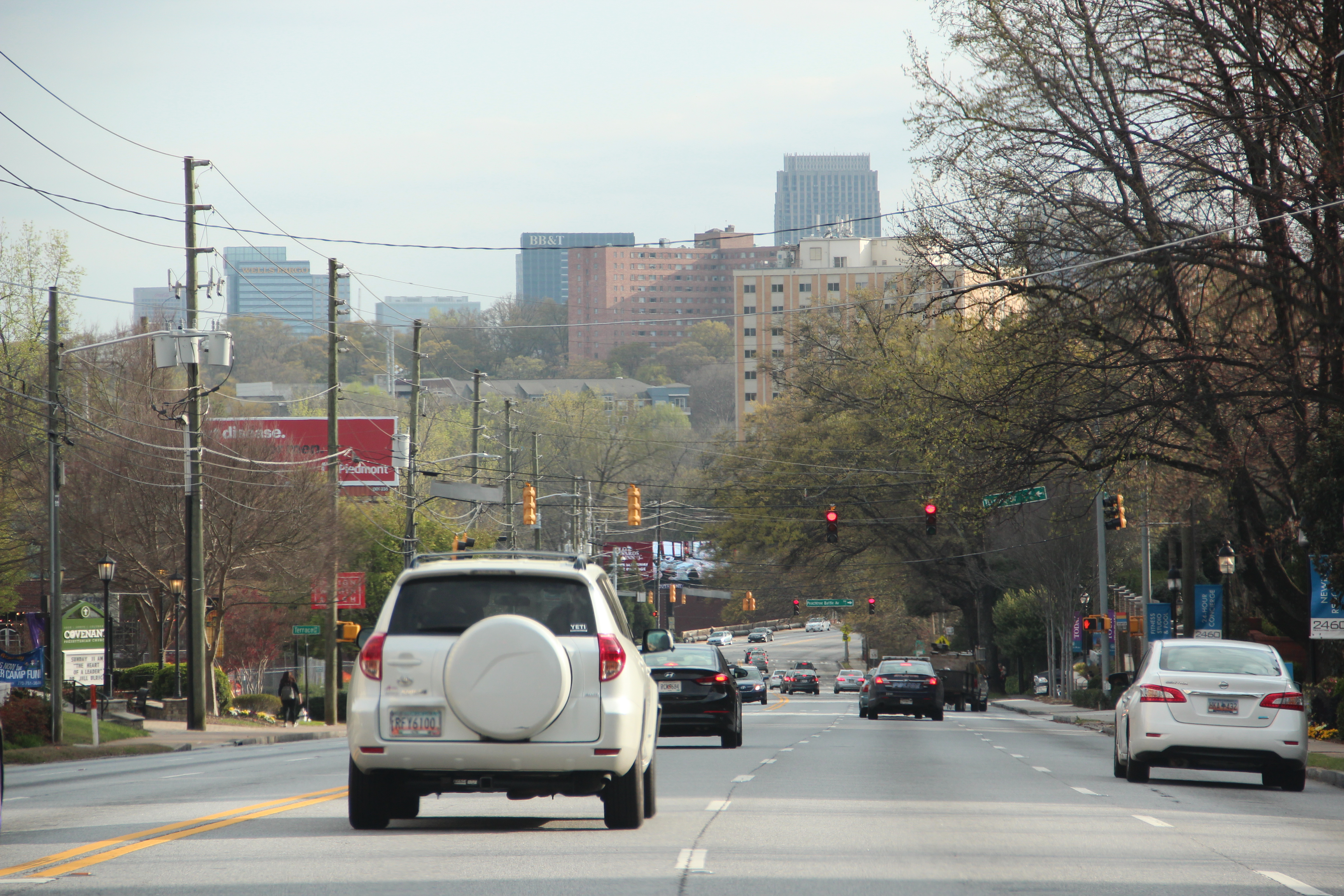
US 19 in Atlanta

US 19 enters Georgia in a concurrency with State Route 3 (SR 3) and SR 300 as Lee Highway south-southeast of Thomasville. Within the vicinity of Thomasville, it has a concurrency with US 84 where it has intersections with SR 122 and US 319 before US 84 finally branches off to the west. It continues north, traveling through Meigs where it intersects SR 3 Alternate and SR 111. Later, it runs through Albany, where it becomes a limited-access highway and has a brief concurrency with US 82 and the concurrency with SR 300 comes to an end. Further north, it runs through Americus, where it joins US 280 for one mile (1.6 km), then Ellaville, where it intersects SR 26. Between Taylor and Upson county, it has a concurrency with US 80 that ends south of Thomaston and later runs through Zebulon where it runs in a one-way pair and intersects SR 18. It joins US 41 and proceeds north to Griffin. It then proceeds through the western tip of Henry County, traveling through Hampton, home of the Atlanta Motor Speedway. US 19 continues north through Clayton County where it is known as Tara Boulevard, before entering Atlanta.

Within Atlanta, US 19/US 41 runs along Northside Drive where it is joined by US 29/SR 3 Connector (Chapel Street Southwest). From there, US 9/US 29/US 41/SR 3 runs north and then curves northeast, passing by a group of condominiums called "The Villages of Castleberry Hill", before the road curves straight north between Nelson Street Southwest and Markham Street Southwest. Here, the routes run along the west side of Mercedes-Benz Stadium next door to the Georgia World Congress Center. US 29 leaves the concurrency with US 19/US 41 in the vicinity of Georgia Tech and turns northwest onto US 78/US 278/SR 8, which leaves US 9/US 41 to go west. The highway briefly curves northeast as it passes over some Norfolk Southern Railway lines, then turns north again at a partial interchange with Tech Parkway Northwest. Leaving the vicinity of Georgia Tech, it splits from US 41/SR 3 after traveling through Downtown Atlanta and turns right onto on 14th Street, which is also the western beginning of SR 9. One block after the interchange with Interstate 75 (I-75)/I-85 (Downtown Connector) in Midtown, it has an intersection with a one-way pair with Spring Street (southbound US 9) before turning north on Peachtree Street. The one-way pair ends at the vicinity of a complex interchange with SR 13 and the Savannah College of Art and Design Atlanta Campus, just south of a crossing over I-85, which includes historic Peachtree station. After several miles, it intersects SR 141 in Buckhead, where Peachtree Street continues. It follows Roswell Road north through the city of Sandy Springs. At its southern interchange with I-285, it splits from SR 9, and overlaps I-285 between exits 25 and 27, the latter of which is for SR 400, which it overlaps north of there.

Most of this section is a limited-access road with four lanes in each direction, becoming two lanes in each direction as the highway continues away from the northern suburbs of Atlanta. It arrives in Dahlonega, where it is no longer concurrent with SR 400, before about 37 miles (60 km) of extremely curvy road, which includes a concurrency with US 129. From the north side of the state, the last major town it travels through is Blairsville.

Northwest from there, US 19/US 129/SR 11 passes the southwest border of the Butternut Creek Golf Course before entering Youngstown. The road turns north again where it utilizes a short causeway over Wellborn Branch, a tributary of the Nottely River before intersecting the northern terminus of Pat Haralson Memorial Drive. The road enters Canal Lake where another short causeway that makes a pond leading to Stevens Branch Creek. In Ivylog, the eastern terminus of SR 325 can be found across from Ivy Log Road. At the southwest corner of the North Carolina state line, SR 11 meets its northern terminus, while US 19 continues toward Erie, Pennsylvania and US 129 continues toward Knoxville, Tennessee.

The following portions of US 19 in Georgia is part of the National Highway System, a system of routes determined to be the most important for the nation's economy, mobility, and defense:

- From the Florida state line to the I-75 interchange west of Morrow.
- From the SR 13 interchange in Atlanta to the North Carolina state line.

== History ==
US 19 has been gradually four-laned since the 1950s. Initially, this was in the urban areas, but Georgia began four-laning the route through most of the rural sections of the state in the 1990s. The section from Griffin to Thomaston was four-laned by the early 1990s, while the section from Thomaston to Leesburg was completed in sections between 2000 and 2010.

In 2006, business and government officials in Southwest Georgia began a campaign to have I-185 extended to Monticello, Florida, and connect with I-10. The proposed route of the highway would have traveled parallel to SR 520 (known as "Corridor Z") to Albany and then parallel to US 19. Local opposition to the plan soon emerged. Critics argued that the proposed interstate would siphon business from small towns that the new road bypassed. In 2009, the Georgia Department of Transportation (GDOT) concluded a two-year study of the proposal, which found that extending I-185 would "be inconsistent with existing comprehensive land use plans; would have a negative impact on prime agricultural land, forests and cultural assets; and could have a detrimental impact on poverty and minority populations". GDOT announced it would instead focus on upgrading and improving other key arterial highways in southwest Georgia, including SR 133 between Albany and Valdosta.

== Major intersections ==
County	Location	mi	km	Exit	Destinations	Notes
Thomas		0.00	0.00		US 19 south (SR 57) / SR 3 begins / SR 300 begins – Monticello	Florida state line; southern end of SR 3 and SR 300 concurrencies; southern terminus of SR 3/SR 300
see SR 300
Dougherty	Albany	70.6	113.6	3	US 82 east / SR 520 east / SR 300 north (Clark Avenue) – Atlanta, Cordele, Sylvester, Tifton	Northern end of SR 300 concurrency; southern end of US 82/SR 520 concurrency
Dougherty	Albany	71.9	115.7	4	Blaylock Street	
Dougherty	Albany	73.9	118.9	5	SR 91 / SR 133 north (Jefferson Street) – Downtown Albany	Northern end of SR 133 concurrency; signed northbound as exits 5A (north) and 5B (south)
Dougherty	Albany	75.2	121.0		US 82 west / SR 520 west (Liberty Expressway) / US 19 Bus. south / US 82 Bus. east / SR 520 Bus. east (Slappey Boulevard) – Dawson, Columbus	Northern end of US 82/SR 520 concurrency; northern terminus of US 19 Bus.; western terminus of US 82 Bus./SR 520 Bus.; US 19 north follows exit 6A; US 19 Bus./US 82 Bus./SR 520 Bus. is exit 6B northbound.
Lee		78.2	125.9		SR 133 south (Forrester Parkway) – Doerun, The Parks at Chehaw	Northern terminus of SR 133
Lee	Leesburg	82.5	132.8		US 19 Byp. north / SR 3 Byp. north / SR 32 west (Dawson Road) / SR 32 Truck east (Robert B. Lee Drive) – Dawson, Americus	Southern end of SR 32 concurrency; southern terminus of US 19 Byp./SR 3 Byp.; western terminus of SR 32 Truck
Lee	Leesburg	83.4	134.2		SR 32 east (4th Street) – Leslie, De Soto, Ashburn	Northern end of SR 32 concurrency, former southern terminus of SR 195
Lee	Leesburg	84.0	135.2		US 19 Byp. south / SR 3 Byp. south – Dawson, Albany	Northern terminus of US 19 Byp./SR 3 Byp.
Lee	Leesburg	84.4	135.8		SR 195 north – Leslie	Southern terminus of SR 195
Lee	Smithville	96.0	154.5		SR 118 (Long Drive) – Dawson, Bronwood, Downtown Smithville	
Lee		98.1	157.9		SR 308 west (Bond Trail Road)	Eastern terminus of SR 308
Sumter		108	174		US 280 west / SR 27 west / SR 49 south / Spring Street – Plains, Dawson	Southern end of US 280/SR 27/SR 49 concurrency
Sumter	Americus	109	175		US 280 east / SR 27 east / SR 30 east / SR 49 north (West Lamar Street) – Cordele, Oglethorpe, Georgia Southwestern State University, Habitat for Humanity Global Village & Discovery Center	Northern end of US 280/SR 27/SR 49 concurrency; southern end of SR 30 concurrency
Sumter	Americus	110	180		SR 30 west (Adderton Street) – Concord, Buena Vista	Northern end of SR 30 concurrency
Schley		118	190		SR 271 east – Andersonville	Western terminus of SR 271
Schley		121	195		SR 228 east – Andersonville	Western terminus of SR 228
Schley		121	195		Andersonville Road	Former SR 228 west
Schley	Ellaville	122	196		SR 26 – Ellaville, Oglethorpe	
Schley	Murrays Crossroads	128	206		SR 240 – Tazewell	
Taylor		135	217		SR 90 west / SR 127 west – Mauk	Southern end of SR 90 and SR 127 concurrencies
Taylor		136	219		SR 127 east – Marshallville	Northern end of SR 127 concurrency
Taylor	Rupert	137	220		SR 90 east – Ideal, Andersonville National Historic Site	Northern end of SR 90 concurrency
Taylor	Butler	145	233		SR 96 (Butler Bypass) / SR 540 – Geneva, Fort Valley, Columbus	
Taylor	Butler	146	235		SR 137 – Buena Vista, Fort Valley, Southern Crescent Technical College Taylor County Center	
Taylor		153	246		SR 208 (Old Wire Road) – Talbotton, Roberta	
Taylor		158	254		US 80 west / SR 22 west – Talbotton, Columbus	Southern end of US 80/SR 22 concurrency
Flint River				Garland T. Byrd Bridge		
Upson	Salem	160	260		US 80 east / SR 22 east – Macon	Northern end of US 80/SR 22 concurrency
Upson	Thomaston	173	278		SR 36 east / SR 74 east (Gordon Street) – Barnesville, Jackson, Yatesville, Macon	Eastbound lanes of SR 36/SR 74 on one-way pair
Upson	Thomaston	174	280		SR 36 west / SR 74 west (Main Street) – Woodbury, Greenville, Woodland, Columbus	Westbound lanes of SR 36/SR 74 on one-way pair
Pike		185	298		SR 109 west – Lifsey Springs, Molena	Southern end of SR 109 concurrency
Pike		186	299		SR 109 east – Meansville	Northern end of SR 109 concurrency
Pike	Zebulon	190	310		SR 18 – Concord, Barnesville	
Spalding		197	317		US 41 south / SR 7 south (Martin L. King Jr. Parkway) / US 19 Bus. north / US 41 Bus. north / SR 155 north (Zebulon Parkway) – Barnesville, Griffin, Airport	Southern end of US 41 concurrency; northern terminus of SR 7; southern terminus of US 19 Bus./US 41 Bus./SR 155
see US 41
Fulton	Atlanta	243	391		US 41 north / SR 3 north (SR 9 / Northside Drive NW)	Northern end of US 41/SR 3 concurrency; southern end of SR 9 concurrency; southern terminus of SR 9
Fulton	Atlanta	244	393		I-75 / I-85 south (Downtown Connector / SR 295 / SR 401 / SR 403 / Downtown Connector)	I-75 exit 250 / I-85 exit 84
Fulton	Atlanta	245	394		SR 13 north (Buford Highway) to I-85 north / SR 400	Interchange; southern terminus of SR 13
Fulton	Atlanta	248	399		SR 141 north (Peachtree Road NE)	Southern terminus of SR 141
Fulton	Atlanta	249	401		SR 237 south (Piedmont Road NE)	Northern terminus of SR 237
Fulton	Sandy Springs	253	407	25	I-285 west (SR 407) / SR 9 north (Roswell Road) – Chattanooga, Birmingham	Northern end of SR 9 concurrency; southern end of I-285 concurrency; US 19 south follows exit 25; Dorothy Felton Interchange.
Fulton	Sandy Springs	254	409	26	Glenridge Drive / Glenridge Connector	Northbound exit and southbound entrance; former SR 407 Loop
Fulton	Sandy Springs	254	409	27 4A	I-285 east (SR 407) / SR 400 south – Greenville, SC, Augusta, Buckhead, Atlanta	Northern end of I-285 concurrency; southern end of SR 400 concurrency; US 19 north follows exit 27; US 19 south follows exit 4B.
see SR 400
Lumpkin		301	484		SR 60 south / SR 115 east – Cleveland, Murrayville, Gainesville, Smithgall Woods Center, Unicoi State Park	Northern end of SR 400 concurrency; southern end of SR 60 concurrency
Lumpkin	Dahlonega	306	492		SR 9 south / SR 52 west (Morrison Moore Parkway) / South Chestatee Street – Dahlonega, Dawsonville, Ellijay, Historic Dahlonega Gold Museum, Historic Dahlonega, University of North Georgia	Southern end of SR 9 and SR 52 concurrencies
Lumpkin	Dahlonega	307	494		US 19 Bus. north / SR 60 Bus. north (East Main Street) – Dahlonega, Historic Dahlonega Gold Museum, Historic Dahlonega	Southern terminus of US 19 Bus./SR 60 Bus.
Lumpkin	Dahlonega	307	494		SR 52 east – Cleveland, Lula	Northern end of SR 52 concurrency
Lumpkin		309	497		US 19 Bus. south / SR 60 Bus. south	Northern terminus of US 19 Bus./SR 60 Bus.
Lumpkin	Porter Springs	314	505		SR 60 north – Suches, Morganton	Northern end of SR 60 concurrency
Lumpkin	Turners Corner	319	513		US 129 south (SR 9) / SR 11 south – Cleveland, Helen	Northern end of SR 9 concurrency; southern end of US 129/SR 11 concurrency; northern terminus of SR 9
see US 129
Union		351	565		US 19 north / US 129 north (Blairsville Highway) – Murphy	North Carolina state line; northern terminus of SR 11
1.000 mi = 1.609 km; 1.000 km = 0.621 mi: Concurrency terminus; Incomplete access

== See also ==
- Special routes of U.S. Route 19
- Georgia State Route 400

U.S. Route 19
Previous state: Florida	Georgia	Next state: North Carolina
