= Griffin–Spalding County Airport =

Airport in Griffin, Georgia, United States

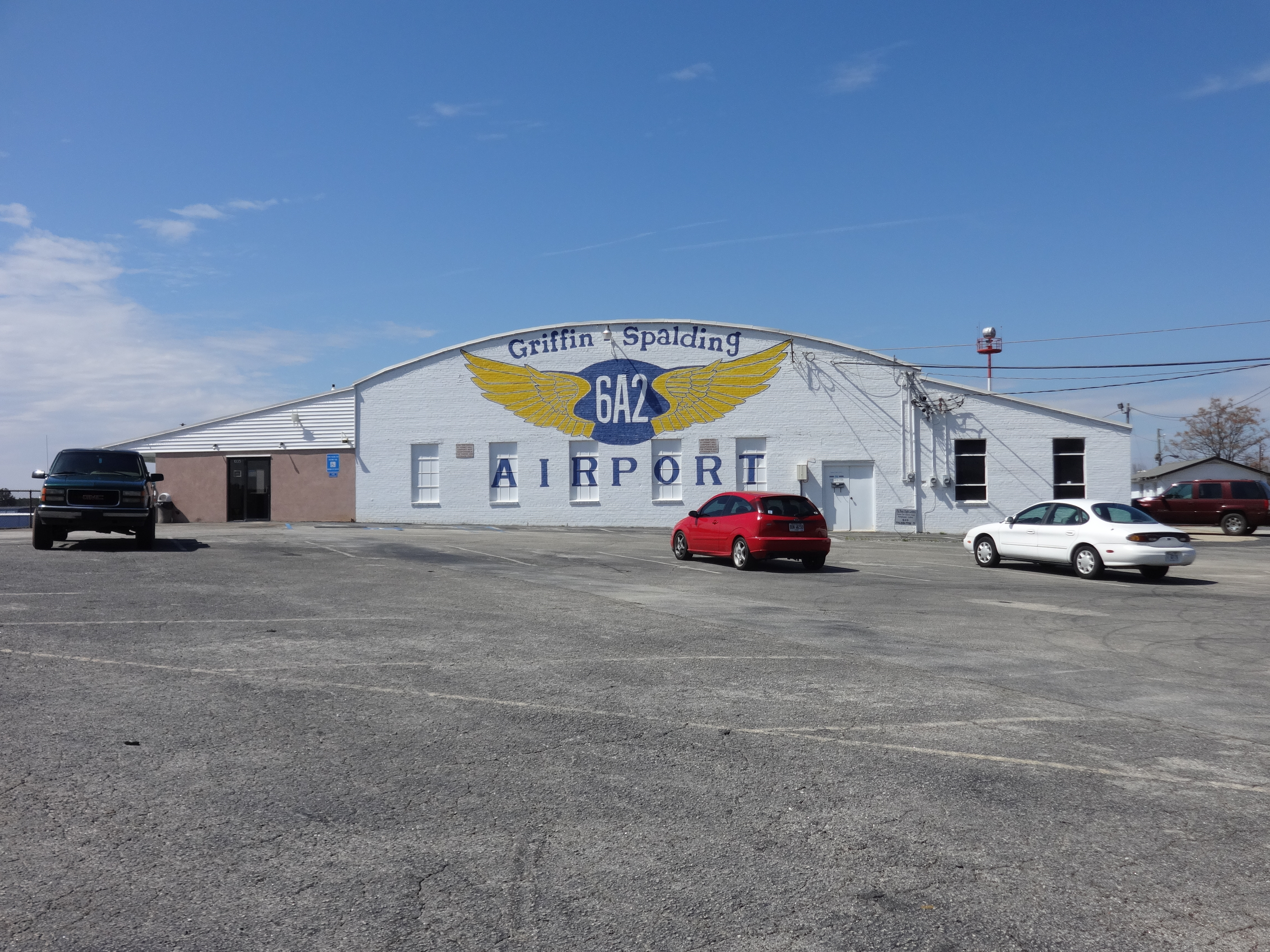
- IATA: none; ICAO: none; FAA LID: 6A2

Summary
- Airport type: Public
- Owner: Griffin Spalding Airport Authority
- Serves: Griffin, Georgia, US
- Elevation AMSL: 958 ft (292 m)
- Coordinates: 33°13′35″N 84°16′32″W
- Website: Official website
- Interactive map of Griffin–Spalding County Airport

Runways
Direction	Length		Surface
Direction	ft	m	Surface
14/32	3,701	1,128	Asphalt

Statistics (2011)
- Based aircraft: 90
- Sources: FAA

Griffin–Spalding County Airport (FAA LID: 6A2) is a city-owned, public-use airport located one nautical mile (2 km) south of the central business district of Griffin, a city in Spalding County, Georgia, United States. It is included in the National Plan of Integrated Airport Systems for 2011–2015, which categorized it as a general aviation facility.

== History ==
Griffin–Spalding County Airport was built in 1939. Despite the relatively short length of its then 3,100-foot-long (940 m) runway, Griffin's airport hosted various large piston aircraft including the Douglas DC-3 and the Aviation Traders Carvair, a cargo conversion of the DC-4 from the 1970s until the 1990s. For the 12-month period ending on July 3, 2011, there were 90 aircraft based at this airport.

A proposal was made by the airport authority prior to 2014 to close the airport and pay back the FAA, but the FAA rejected the proposal that year citing the closure of the airport would contradict their mission to promote aviation and improve aviation infrastructure. A sum of $55.4 million in federal and state funding has been secured to relocate the airport within Spalding County. In 2024, the city manager of Griffin announced the new airport could open by 2029. Eminent domain is being used to acquire 730-acre site (300 ha) as needed.

== Facilities ==
Griffin–Spalding County Airport covers an area of 198 acres (80 ha) at an elevation of 958 feet (292 m) above mean sea level. It is an uncontrolled airport that lies beneath, but not within the Class B airspace surrounding Hartsfield–Jackson Atlanta International Airport. It has one runway designated 14/32 with an asphalt surface measuring 3,701 by 75 feet (1,128 x 23 m). In addition to general aviation facilities, the airport also hosts an air ambulance, an aviation division of the Georgia State Patrol and Civil Air Patrol, and aircraft manufacturing and salvage facilities.

== Accidents ==
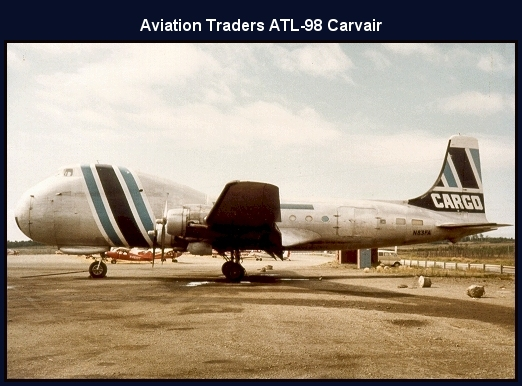
The Aviation Traders Carvair N83FA that crashed on April 4, 1997

- On April 4, 1997, at 12:16 am, a Custom Air Service flight going to Rockford, Illinois, via Albany, Georgia, using an Aviation Traders Carvair crashed into a disused Piggly Wiggly grocery store 1,360 feet (410 m) beyond the departure end of Runway 32 following an engine failure during the takeoff roll. The aircraft was completely destroyed in the resulting fire and the crew, the only occupants of the aircraft, were both killed.
- On November 21, 2003, at 12:45 pm, a Beechcraft Baron crashed due to the loss of engine power during a maintenance flight approximately one-quarter mile (0.40 km) beyond the departure end of Runway 32. The sole occupant of the aircraft, the pilot, was killed on impact with a commercial building. No other casualties were caused by the accident.
- On November 11, 2009, a pilot attempted to flee from authorities in his DC-3 after being cited for driving his automobile on the runway. The pilot was unable to take off and was suspended from employment with Delta Air Lines following his arrest. The incident shut down the airport for 45 minutes.

== See also ==
- List of airports in Georgia (U.S. state)
