= Georgia State Route 270 =

Highway in Georgia

State Route 270
- SR 270 highlighted in red

Route information
- Maintained by GDOT
- Length: 12.7 mi (20.4 km)
- Existed: 1950–present

Major junctions
- West end: SR 93 in Sale City
- SR 133 in Doerun
- East end: SR 33 east of Doerun

Location
- Country: United States
- State: Georgia
- Counties: Mitchell, Colquitt

Highway system
- Georgia State Highway System; Interstate; US; State; Special
← US 270	→ SR 271

State Route 270 (SR 270) is a 12.7-mile-long (20.4 km) east–west state highway located in the southern part of the U.S. state of Georgia. Its route is within Mitchell and Colquitt counties.

== Route description ==
There is no section of SR 270 that is included as a part of the National Highway System, a system of routes determined to be the most important for the nation's economy, mobility and defense.

SR 270 begins at an oblique intersection with SR 93 (North Barnes Street) in Sale City, which is in the east-central part of Mitchell County. The route heads northeast out of town to an intersection with Grantham Road, where it curves to the north-northeast. It continues to the north-northeast until it crosses into Colquitt County to an intersection with Greenough Road, where the route turns to the east along Greenough Road. Northeast of that intersection, SR 270 passed Barrens Golf Course. Farther to the east is an intersection with Thigpen Trail, which leads to the unincorporated communities of Bridgeboro and Hartsfield. The route continues to the northeast to Doerun, where it shares a brief concurrency with SR 133 along Broad Avenue. At the intersection with Peachtree Street, SR 133/SR 270 cross a Norfolk Southern Railway line. The route continues to the east until it crosses the Ochlockonee and Little Ochlockonee rivers. The road heads northeast until it meets its eastern terminus, an intersection with SR 33, in the northwestern part of Colquitt County. Here, the roadway continues as Bob Sims Road, and SR 33 north enters Worth County.

== History ==
SR 270 was established in 1950 along the same alignment as it travels today, except that the western terminus was just north of Sale City, with the section from Doerun to its eastern terminus paved. By 1953, the section from the Mitchell-Colquitt County line to Doerun was paved. By 1957, the road's western terminus was moved to Sale City, and the whole length was paved.

== Major intersections ==
County	Location	mi	km	Destinations	Notes
Mitchell	Sale City	0.0	0.0	SR 93 (North Barnes Street) – Pelham, Baconton	Western terminus
Colquitt	Doerun	7.5	12.1	SR 270 Spur east	Western terminus of SR 270 Spur
Colquitt	Doerun	7.6	12.2	SR 133 north (West Broad Avenue) – Albany	Western end of SR 133 concurrency
Colquitt	Doerun	8.2	13.2	SR 133 south – Moultrie	Eastern end of SR 133 concurrency
Colquitt	Ochlockonee River			Crossing	
Colquitt	Little Ochlockonee River			Crossing	
Colquitt		12.7	20.4	SR 33 – Moultrie, Sylvester	Eastern terminus
1.000 mi = 1.609 km; 1.000 km = 0.621 mi: Concurrency terminus

== Spur route ==
State Route 270 Spur
- Location: Doerun
- Length: 0.7 mi (1,100 m)

State Route 270 Spur (SR 270 Spur) is a 0.7-mile-long (1.1 km) spur route that exists entirely within Doerun.

The spur route begins in the western part of Doerun, at an intersection with the SR 270 mainline (Ticknor and Greenough Roads). It heads east along Bay Avenue. Just past the intersection with Peachtree Street, the route becomes known as Bay Street and crosses over the same Norfolk Southern Railway line that the SR 270 mainline crosses over. It continues to the east until it meets its eastern terminus, an intersection with SR 133 in the southeast part of Doerun.

There is no section of SR 270 Spur that is included as a part of the National Highway System.

The entire route is in Doerun, Colquitt County.

mi	km	Destinations	Notes
0.0	0.0	SR 270 (Ticknor Road/Greenough Road) – Sale City	Western terminus
0.7	1.1	SR 133 (Billy Langdale Parkway) – Moultrie, Albany	Eastern terminus
1.000 mi = 1.609 km; 1.000 km = 0.621 mi
