= Georgia State Route 133 =

State highway in Georgia, United States

State Route 133
- Sunbelt Parkway
- Georgia State Route 133 highlighted in red

Route information
- Maintained by GDOT
- Length: 82.8 mi (133.3 km)

Major junctions
- South end: US 84 / US 221 / SR 38 / SR 94 in Valdosta
- I-75 in Valdosta; US 319 / SR 35 in Moultrie; US 319 / US 319 Bus. / SR 33 / SR 35 in Moultrie; US 19 / SR 3 / SR 234 / SR 300 southeast of Albany; US 19 Bus. / US 82 Bus. / SR 520 Bus. in Albany; US 82 / SR 300 / SR 520 in Albany; US 19 / US 82 / SR 3 / SR 520 in Albany
- North end: US 19 / SR 3 north of Albany

Location
- Country: United States
- State: Georgia
- Counties: Lowndes, Brooks, Colquitt, Worth, Dougherty, Lee

Highway system
- Georgia State Highway System; Interstate; US; State; Special
← SR 132	→ SR 135

State Route 133 (SR 133) is an 82.8-mile-long (133.3 km) four-lane southeast-to-northwest state highway in the southwestern part of the U.S. state of Georgia. It travels through portions of Lowndes, Brooks, Colquitt, Worth, Dougherty, and Lee counties. It connects the Valdosta and Albany areas.

== Route description ==
SR 133 begins at an intersection with US 84/US 221/SR 38/SR 94 (West Hill Avenue) in Valdosta, within Lowndes County. It has an interchange with Interstate 75 (I-75) before passing through Troupville and crossing over the Withlacoochee and Little rivers, the latter one marksing the Lowndes–Brooks county line. It heads northwest to Morven and an intersection with SR 76. It continues northwest to SR 122 and SR 333 (Moultrie Road). A short distance later, it enters Colquitt County. The road passes through the town of Berlin, and past the Spence Airport, before it reaches Moultrie. In town, it first meets US 319/SR 35 (East Bypass) and SR 37 (1st Avenue SE). SR 37/SR 133 join the concurrency to the north. A short distance later, SR 37 departs to the northeast The concurrency curves to the northwest to meet the northern terminus of US 319 Business. At this intersection, US 319/SR 35 depart to the northeast, while SR 33 (which runs concurrent with US 319 Business) joins SR 133 to the northwest. The highways split, and SR 133 travels through rural areas of the county until it reaches Doerun. In town, it has an intersection with SR 270 Spur (East Bay Street). Less than 300 feet (91 m) later, it joins SR 270 in a concurrency to the west. At North Broad Street, the highways split, with SR 133 continuing to head west. Northwest of Doerun, the road enters Worth County. It travels through rural areas of the county, before it crosses into Dougherty County. It continues to the northwest until it enter Albany. In Albany, it has an interchange with US 19/SR 3/SR 300 (Liberty Expressway). This interchange marks the eastern terminus of SR 234 (Moultrie Road). US 19/SR 3/SR 133/SR 300 head north on the Liberty Expressway. They meet US 82 Business/SR 520 Business (East Oglethorpe Boulevard). This interchange also marks the southern terminus of US 19 Business. Less than 1 mile (1.6 km) later, SR 300 leaves the concurrency, and US 82/SR 520 (Clark Avenue) join it. The concurrency curves to the northwest and crosses over the Flint River. The next interchange is SR 91 (North Jefferson Street), where SR 133 departs the concurrency. Almost immediately, SR 91 (Philema Road) leaves to the northeast, and SR 133 continues to the northwest. It crosses over the western part of Lake Worth. Almost immediately the highway enters Lee County. Finally, it continues northwest for a little while until it meets its northern terminus, an intersection with US 19/SR 3 (Walnut Street), north of Albany.

All of SR 133 from its southern terminus in Valdosta until the point it leaves the Liberty Expressway in Albany is part of the National Highway System, a system of roadways important to the nation's economy, defense, and mobility.

== Major intersections ==
County	Location	mi	km	Destinations	Notes
Lowndes	Valdosta	0.0	0.0	US 84 / US 221 / SR 38 / SR 94 (West Hill Avenue)	Southern terminus
Lowndes	Valdosta	2.2	3.5	I-75 (SR 401) – Lake City, Macon	I-75 exit 18
Brooks	Morven	15.3	24.6	SR 76	
Brooks		20.9	33.6	SR 122 – Thomasville, Pavo	
Brooks		22.2	35.7	SR 333 (Moultrie Road) – Quitman, Madison	Northern terminus of SR 333; access to Madison via SR 53
Colquitt	Moultrie	38.2	61.5	US 319 south / SR 35 south (Veterans Parkway) / SR 37 west (1st Avenue SE) – Thomasville, Camilla	Southern end of US 319/SR 35 and SR 37 concurrencies
Colquitt	Moultrie	38.9	62.6	SR 37 east (4th Avenue NE) – Adel	Northern end of SR 37 concurrency
Colquitt	Moultrie	40.7	65.5	US 319 north / SR 35 north (Tifton Highway) / US 319 Bus. south / SR 33 south to I-75 – Tifton	Northern end of US 319/SR 35 concurrency; southern end of SR 33 concurrency; northern terminus of US 319 Bus.
Colquitt		42.5	68.4	SR 33 north – Sylvester	Northern end of SR 33 concurrency
Colquitt		46.2	74.4	SR 133 Alt. south – Moultrie	Northern terminus of SR 133 Alt.
Colquitt	Doerun	52.0	83.7	SR 270 Spur west (East Bay Street)	Eastern terminus of SR 270 Spur
Colquitt	Doerun	52.1	83.8	SR 270 east (East Broad Avenue)	Southern end of SR 270 concurrency
Colquitt	Doerun	52.4	84.3	SR 270 west (North Broad Street) – Sale City	Northern end of SR 270 concurrency
Worth		60.5	97.4	SR 112 – Camilla, Sylvester	
Dougherty		73.0	117.5	US 19 south / SR 3 south / SR 300 south (Liberty Expressway) / SR 234 west (Moultrie Road)	Southern end of US 19/SR 3/SR 300 concurrency
Dougherty	Albany	74.9	120.5	US 19 Bus. north / US 82 Bus. / SR 520 Bus. (East Oglethorpe Boulevard)	Southern terminus of US 19 Bus.
Dougherty	Albany	75.6	121.7	US 82 east / SR 520 east / SR 300 north (Clark Avenue)	Northern end of SR 300 concurrency; southern end of US 82/SR 520 concurrency
Dougherty	Albany	78.7	126.7	US 19 north / SR 3 north / US 82 west / SR 520 west (Liberty Expressway) / SR 91 south – Leesburg, Dawson, Newton	Northern end of US 19/US 82/SR 3/SR 520 concurrency; southern end of SR 91 concurrency
Dougherty	Albany	79.1	127.3	SR 91 north (Philema Road)	Northern end of SR 91 concurrency
Lee		82.8	133.3	US 19 / SR 3 (Walnut Street)	Northern terminus
1.000 mi = 1.609 km; 1.000 km = 0.621 mi: Concurrency terminus

== Related route ==
State Route 133 Alternate
- Location: Moultrie
- Length: 6.1 mi (9.8 km)

State Route 133 Alternate (SR 133 Alt.) is a 6.1-mile-long (9.8 km) alternate route that exists entirely within the central part of Colquitt County. It is known as Old Doerun Road for its entire length.

It begins at an intersection with US 319 Business/SR 33 (North Main Street) in downtown Moultrie. It heads west and curves to the northwest to meet SR 111 (West Bypass) in the northwest part of the city. The highway travels through rural areas until it meets the SR 133 mainline in a rural part of Colquitt County, northwest of Moultrie.

SR 133 Alt. is not part of the National Highway System, a system of roadways important to the nation's economy, defense, and mobility.

The entire route is in Colquitt County.

Location	mi	km	Destinations	Notes
Moultrie	0.0	0.0	US 319 Bus. / SR 33 (North Main Street)	Southern terminus
Moultrie	0.7	1.1	SR 111 (West Bypass) – Riverside	
	6.1	9.8	SR 133 – Moultrie, Doerun	Northern terminus
1.000 mi = 1.609 km; 1.000 km = 0.621 mi
