= Georgia State Route 520 =

Highway in Georgia

State Route 520
- South Georgia Parkway
- SR 520 highlighted in red

Route information
- Maintained by GDOT
- Length: 260.1 mi (418.6 km)
- Existed: 1988–present

Major junctions
- West end: US 280 at the Alabama state line in Columbus
- US 27 / SR 1 from Columbus to Cusseta; I-185 in Columbus; US 280 / SR 27 in Richland; US 82 / SR 50 / SR 45 / SR 55 in Dawson; US 19 / SR 3 / SR 300 in Albany; I-75 in Tifton; I-75 BL / US 41 / US 319 / SR 7 / SR 35 / SR 125 in Tifton; US 1 / US 23 / US 84 / SR 4 / SR 38 in Waycross; I-95 / US 17 / US 82 / SR 25 southwest of Brunswick
- East end: Beach View Drive in Jekyll Island

Location
- Country: United States
- State: Georgia
- Counties: Muscogee, Chattahoochee, Stewart, Webster, Terrell, Dougherty, Worth, Tift, Berrien, Atkinson, Ware, Brantley, Glynn

Highway system
- Georgia State Highway System; Interstate; US; State; Special
← I-520	→ SR 540

State Route 520 (SR 520), also known as the South Georgia Parkway, is a 260.1-mile-long (418.6 km) state highway in the southern part of the U.S. state of Georgia. It travels from the Alabama state line at the Chattahoochee River, along the Phenix City, Alabama–Columbus, Georgia line, to Jekyll Island. It has many concurrencies along its path, including U.S. Route 280 (US 280) from the Alabama state line to Richland; US 27 from Columbus to Cusseta; and especially US 82 from Dawson to a point southwest of Brunswick. SR 520 serves as Corridor Z, a high-priority corridor to the Coastal Georgia Regional Development Center and a GRIP (Governor's Road Improvement Program) corridor, but not an Appalachian Regional Development highway, despite its green shield.

== Route description ==
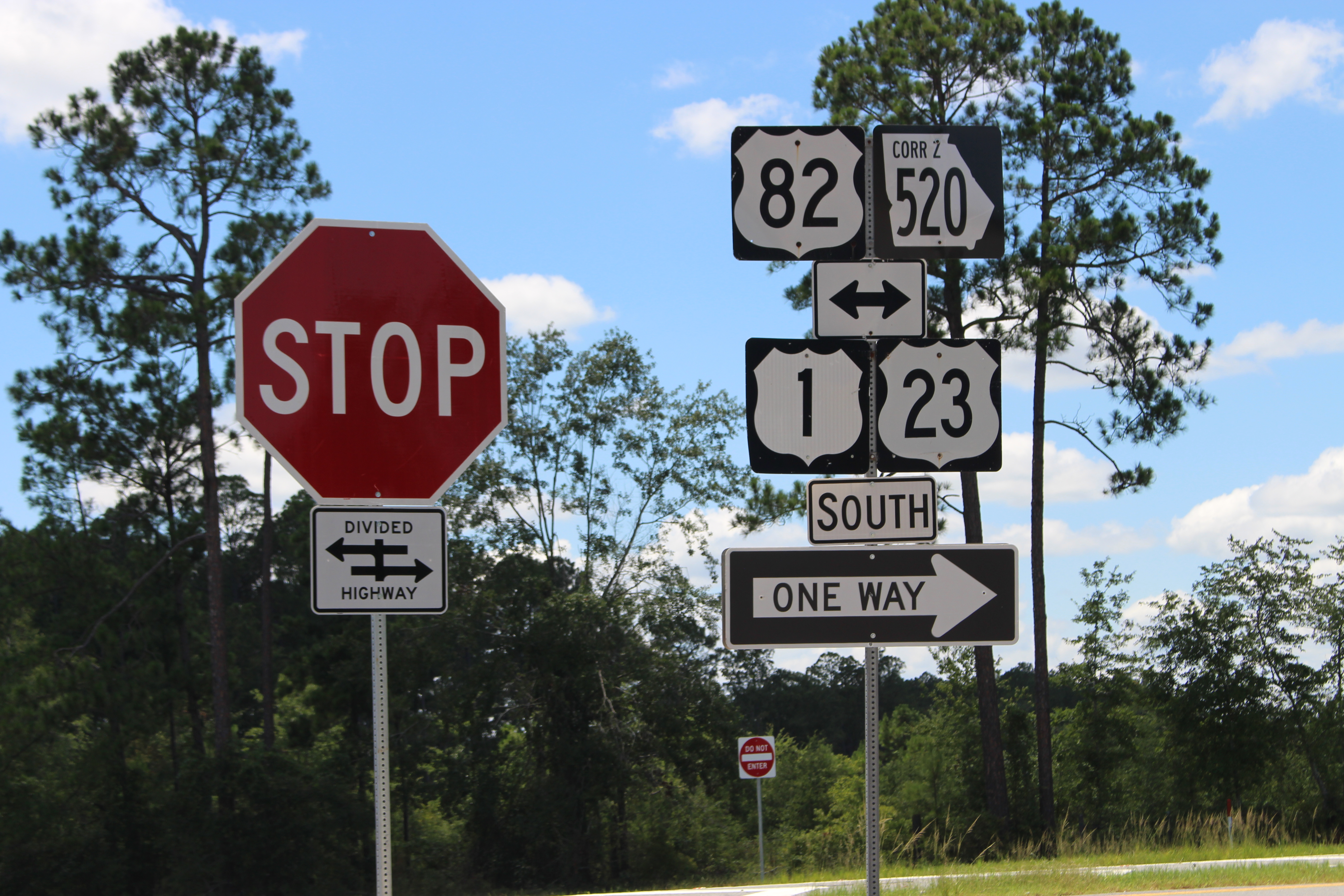
Sign for SR 520 with the Corridor Z designation

While not part of the Appalachian Development Highway System, SR 520 is nevertheless designated as Corridor Z. To emphasize the special designation, SR 520 route markers have a green background and numbers as opposed to black, which is normally used on state Route markers. Some markers also feature the small abbreviation "CORR Z" near the top of the state outline, though this practice is being phased out.

All of SR 520 from the Alabama state line to at least the eastern intersection with US 17/SR 25 near Jekyll Island is part of the National Highway System (NHS), a system of routes determined to be the most important for the nation's economy, mobility and defense.

=== Columbus to Tifton ===
SR 520 begins at the Alabama state line concurrent with US 280. On the Alabama side of the state line, US 280 is concurrent with unsigned Alabama State Route 38. On the Georgia side of the state line, US 280/SR 520 head east through Columbus to an intersection with US 27/SR 1. The four highways head east through the city, along Victory Drive to an interchange with Interstate 185 (I-185), and through Fort Benning. Southeast of Fort Benning, the four highways have an intersection with SR 26 just prior to entering Cusseta. In town, US 27/SR 1 split from the concurrency, toward Lumpkin, while US 280/SR 520 head southeast to Richland. Here, the two highways intersect SR 27, with US 280 heading east along SR 27. SR 520 heads southeast alone, intersecting SR 41 in Weston, before reaching Dawson. In Dawson, there is an intersection with SR 45, which begins a short concurrency with SR 520. A short distance later is an intersection with SR 32, followed by US 82/SR 45/SR 50, where the concurrency with SR 45 ends and the one with US 82 begins. Just before leaving town, US 82/SR 520 intersect SR 55. The two highways head east until they reach Albany.

Upon entering Albany, the two highways become a freeway known as Liberty Expressway. At the intersection with US 19/SR 3, which join the concurrency, US 19 Business/US 82 Business/SR 520 Business head south into downtown Albany. At the next exit is SR 91/SR 133. SR 133 joins the concurrency at this point. The five highways curve to the south, where US 82/SR 520 head east along with SR 300. Here, US 19/SR 3/SR 133/SR 300 continue south on the expressway. Just east of Albany, SR 300 leaves the concurrency to the northeast. US 82/SR 520 then intersect US 82 Business/SR 520 Business, where they both meet their eastern terminus. The concurrency heads to Sylvester. There, they meet SR 313, SR 33, and SR 112. The two routes continue easterly to Tifton.

=== Tifton to Jekyll Island ===
Just after entering Tifton, the two routes meet I-75, before intersecting US 319/SR 35. The two highways join the concurrency for about three miles (4.8 km). In the downtown part of the town is US 41/SR 7/SR 125. After leaving the town, US 319/SR 35 leave the concurrency, while US 82/SR 520 continue to the east-southeast. Prior to entering Alapaha, the concurrent highways intersect US 129/SR 11. These highways join the concurrency until they leave in town about one mile (1.6 km) later. Farther to the east, in Willacoochee, US 82/SR 520 intersect SR 90 and then have a very brief concurrency with SR 135. In Pearson, the concurrency intersects US 221/US 441/SR 31/SR 64. SR 64 joins the concurrency for less than one mile (1.6 km). Just prior to entering Waresboro is an intersection with SR 158. About five miles (8.0 km) later, US 1/US 23/SR 4 join the concurrency for about eight miles (13 km). About three miles (4.8 km) after the beginning of the US 1/US 23/SR 4 concurrency is SR 122. Then, the concurrency enters Waycross.

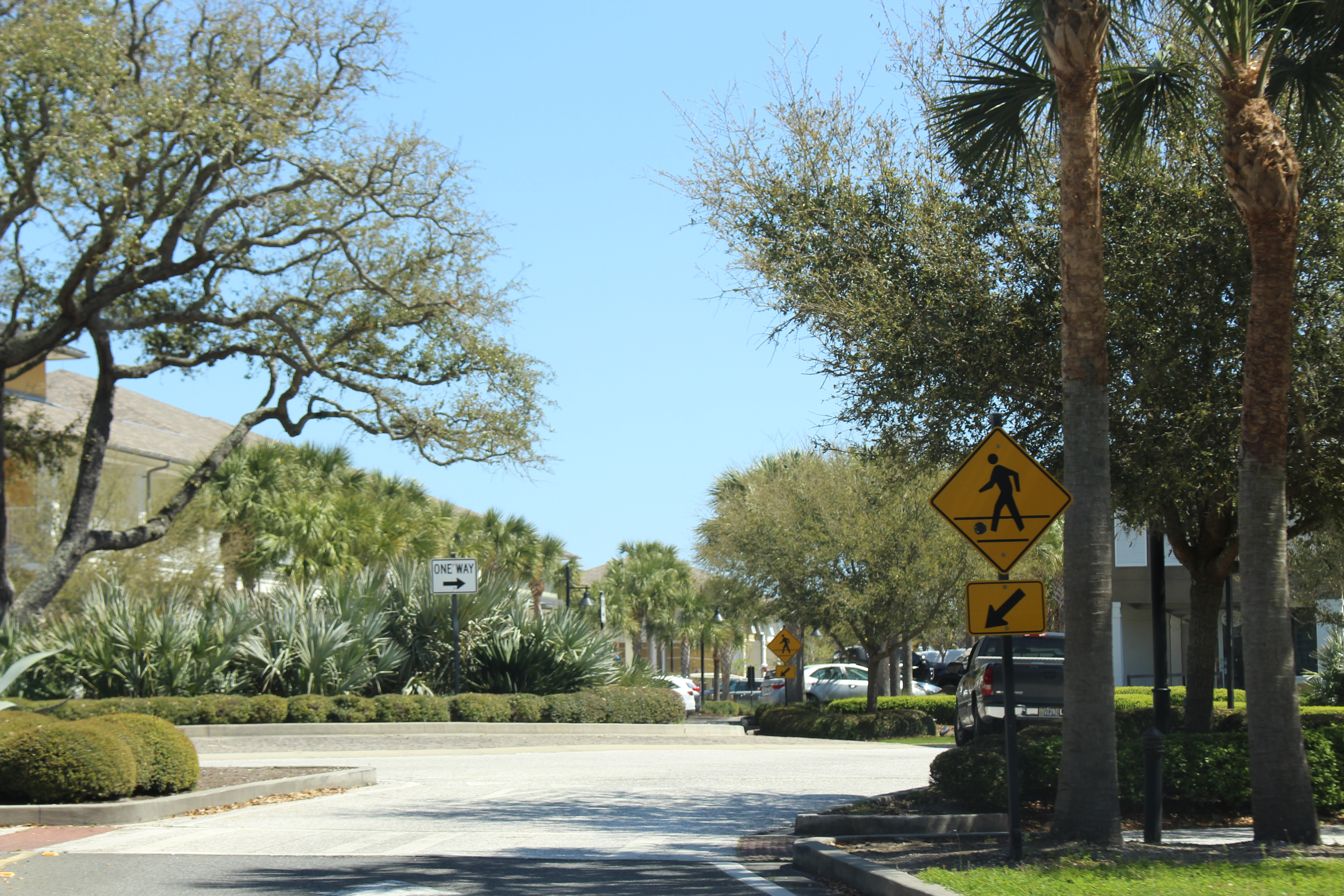
Eastern terminus of SR 520 at a roundabout with Beachview Drive, Jekyll Island

In Waycross, the concurrency meets US 84/SR 38, which join for about one mile (1.6 km). Approximately two miles (3.2 km) later, US 1/US 23/SR 4 depart to the southeast, while US 82/SR 520 head to the east. At this same intersection, US 1 Business/US 23 Business/SR 4 Business head to the northwest. Southeast of Waycross is SR 177, which leads to Laura S. Walker State Park and the Okefenokee Swamp. In Hoboken, is an intersection with SR 15/SR 121. Farther to the east, in Nahunta is US 301/SR 23. In Atkinson is an intersection with SR 259 and a very brief concurrency with SR 110. Approximately nine miles (14 km) later, US 82/SR 520 meet the western terminus of SR 99. Then, just before meeting I-95, is an intersection with US 17/SR 25, along with SR 303. This intersection marks the eastern terminus of US 82. US 17/SR 25/SR 520 head southeast until SR 520 splits to the southeast, along Jekyll Island Causeway, while US 17/SR 25 head north to Brunswick. SR 520 crosses the Jekyll River onto Jekyll Island and terminates at Beach View Drive.

== History ==
=== Before designation ===
The roadway that would eventually become SR 520 was established in 1920 as SR 1 from Columbus to Cusseta, SR 32 from Dawson to Sylvester, and SR 46 from Sylvester to Tifton. In 1921, SR 55 was established along a route from Louvale, at an intersection with SR 1 to Dawson, and SR 50 was established along a stretch of highway from Dawson in the west, to at least as far as Waynesville, at an intersection with SR 27, in the east. Nearly all of SR 55, and all of that stretch of SR 50, were eventually utilized by SR 520. By 1926, a portion of SR 1 southeast of Columbus and a portion of SR 50 west of Sylvester were paved. Also, US 84 was designated along the portion of SR 50 east of Waycross. Sometime around 1926, SR 27 was redesignated as SR 25. By January 1932, US 280 was designated along SR 1 from Columbus to Cusseta and SR 55 from Cusseta to Richland. All of US 280/SR 1 and nearly all of US 280/SR 55 were paved. Also, a portion of SR 55 northwest of Dawson was paved. Almost all of SR 50 from Dawson to Tifton was paved, along with a portion west of Waycross, and the entirety of US 84/SR 50 east of the city. During October of that year all of US 280/SR 55 was paved. By May 1933, a portion of SR 55 between Alapaha and Willacoochee was paved. In June, a small portion of SR 55 southeast of Richland was paved. By October 1934, a portion of SR 50 east of Tifton, as well as one west of Alapaha, was paved. By January 1935, US 27 was designated along US 280/SR 1 from Columbus to Cusseta. By October 1935, all of SR 55 between Richland and Dawson was paved. By July 1936, all of SR 50 from Tifton to Willacoochee was paved. Also, nearly all of SR 50 east of Pearson was paved. By July 1937, all of the highway that would eventually become SR 520 between Columbus and Willacoochee was paved. By October 1939, the last pieces of the highway were paved. In 1948, US 82 entered the state, running concurrent with SR 50 only as far east as Waycross. In addition, SR 50 was extended, and paved, east to Jekyll Island.

=== After designation ===
In 1988, SR 520 was designated along its entire current length, with SR 55 between Richland and Dawson and SR 50 from Dawson to Jekyll Island being decommissioned. In 1989, the sections of US 82 and US 84 east of Waycross were swapped, presumably to make travel less confusing for drivers.

On May 5, 2006, the American Association of State Highway and Transportation Officials (AASHTO) Special Committee on U.S. Route Numbering designated the portion of SR 520 east of US 17 as Interstate 50 for one day, May 7. AASHTO held their Spring 2006 meeting on Jekyll Island and approved the I-50 designation in conjunction with a vintage car ride to be held on May 7 in celebration of the 50th anniversary of the Interstate Highway System.

== Major intersections ==
County	Location	mi	km	Exit	Destinations	Notes
Chattahoochee River		0.0	0.0		US 280 west (SR 38 west) – Phenix City	Continuation into Alabama
Chattahoochee River		0.0	0.0	Oglethorpe Bridge; Georgia–Alabama line; western end of US 280 concurrency		
Muscogee	Columbus	0.4	0.64		US 27 north / SR 1 north (Veterans Parkway) – Hamilton, Waverly Hall, Airport	Western end of US 27/SR 1 concurrency
Muscogee	Columbus	5.6	9.0	—	I-185 north (SR 411) / Fort Benning Main Entrance – LaGrange, Atlanta	West end of freeway; I-185 exit 1; southern terminus of I-185; Ft. Benning exit ramp provides access to Columbus Airport
Muscogee	Columbus	6.7	10.8	—	Cusetta Road / Sand Hill	Split into two separate exits eastbound
Upatoi Creek		7.7	12.4	Bridge		
Chattahoochee	Fort Benning	9.9	15.9	—	8th Division Road Access Point	Interchange
Chattahoochee	Fort Benning	15.9	25.6		SR 26 east – Buena Vista, Camp Darby, Andersonville National Historic Site	At-grade intersection; east end of freeway; western terminus of SR 26
Chattahoochee	Cusseta	16.4	26.4		Broad Street	Former SR 520 Bus. east
Chattahoochee	Cusseta	17.4	28.0		US 27 south / SR 1 south – Lumpkin, Westville, River Bend Park	Eastern end of US 27/SR 1 concurrency
Stewart	Richland	35.1	56.5		US 280 east / SR 27 (Nicholson Street) – Americus, Lumpkin, Plains	Eastern end of US 280 concurrency
Webster	Weston	44.3	71.3		SR 41 – Preston, Shellman	
Terrell		60.4	97.2		SR 45 north to SR 49 – Plains, Concord, Andersonville National Historic Site, Jimmy Carter National Historic Site	Western end of SR 45 concurrency
Terrell	Dawson	62.0	99.8		SR 32 east (Lee Street) to SR 118 – Leesburg, Ashburn, Bronwood, Smithville, Leslie	Western terminus of SR 32
Terrell	Dawson	62.2	100.1		US 82 west / SR 45 south / SR 50 west (Graves Road) – Shellman, Cuthbert, Georgetown, Morgan, Arlington, George T. Bagby State Park	Western end of US 82 concurrency; eastern end of SR 45 concurrency; eastern terminus of SR 50
Terrell	Dawson	62.6	100.7		SR 55 south (South Herod Road) – Herod, Leary	Northern terminus of SR 55
Dougherty	Albany	78.9	127.0	8	Downtown Albany, Albany State University, Albany Tech College, Darton College	North end of Liberty Expressway; left entrance westbound, left exits; no exit number eastbound
Dougherty	Albany	81.1	130.5	7	Nottingham Way	
Dougherty	Albany	82.4	132.6	6	US 19 / SR 3 north (Slappey Boulevard north) / US 19 Bus. south / US 82 Bus. east / SR 520 Bus. east (Slappey Boulevard south) – Atlanta	Western end of US 19/SR 3 concurrency; split into exits 6A (north) and 6B (south/east) westbound
Dougherty	Albany	83.9	135.0	5	SR 91 (N. Jefferson Street) / SR 133 north (Philema Road) – Downtown	Western end of SR 133 concurrency
Dougherty	Albany	86.0	138.4	4	Blaylock Street	
Dougherty	Albany	87.1	140.2		US 19 / SR 3 / SR 300 / SR 133 south (Liberty Expressway south)	Eastern end of US 19/SR 3/SR 133 concurrency; western end of SR 300 concurrency; Liberty Expwy. exit 3
Dougherty	Albany	89.0	143.2		SR 300 north (Georgia-Florida Parkway) – Cordele, Atlanta, Marine Corps Logistics Base, Flint RiverQuarium	Eastern end of SR 300 concurrency
Dougherty		92.9	149.5		US 82 Bus. west / SR 520 Bus. west – Albany	Westbound left exit and eastbound left entrance; interchange
Worth	Sylvester	104.4	168.0		SR 313 north (Monroe Street) – Warwick	Southern terminus of SR 313
Worth	Sylvester	104.8	168.7		SR 112 south (Isabella Street) – Camilla	Western end of SR 112 concurrency
Worth	Sylvester	104.9	168.8		SR 33 / SR 112 north (Main Street) – Cordele, Ashburn, Historical Downtown Sylvester	Eastern end of SR 112 concurrency
Tift	Tifton	124.8	200.8		I-75 (SR 401) – Macon, Valdosta	I-75 exit 62
Tift	Tifton	125.0	201.2		US 319 south / SR 35 south (Virginia Avenue) – Moultrie, Thomasville	Western end of US 319/SR 35 concurrency
Tift	Tifton	126.2	203.1		US 41 / SR 7 / SR 125 (I-75 BL / Main Street) – Adel, Nashville, Ashburn, Fitzgerald	
Tift		127.6	205.4		US 319 north / SR 35 north – Ocilla, Jefferson Davis State Historic Site	Eastern end of US 319/SR 35 concurrency
Berrien		142.7	229.7		US 129 north / SR 11 north – Ocilla, Jefferson Davis State Historic Site	Western end of US 129/SR 11 concurrency
Berrien	Alapaha	143.9	231.6		US 129 south / SR 11 south – Nashville	Eastern end of US 129/SR 11 concurrency
Atkinson	Willacoochee	155.0	249.4		SR 90 north (North Vickers Street) – Lax, Ocilla	
Atkinson	Willacoochee	155.1	249.6		SR 135 south (Peterson Street South) – Lakeland	Western end of SR 135 concurrency
Atkinson	Willacoochee	155.8	250.7		SR 135 north – Douglas	Eastern end of SR 135 concurrency
Atkinson	Pearson	166.9	268.6		US 221 / US 441 / SR 31 / SR 64 west (Main Street) – Douglas, Lakeland, Homerville, General Coffee State Park	Western end of SR 64 concurrency
Atkinson	Pearson	167.0	268.8		SR 64 east (Pearson Street)	Eastern end of SR 64 concurrency
Ware		186.9	300.8		SR 158 west (Douglas Highway) – Douglas, General Coffee State Park	Eastern terminus of SR 158
Ware		192.4	309.6		US 1 north / US 23 north / SR 4 north (Scapa Road) – Alma, Ware State Prison, Airport	Western end of US 1/US 23/SR 4 concurrency
Ware		194.7	313.3		SR 122 west (Carswell Avenue) – Lakeland, Baptist Village	Eastern terminus of SR 122
Ware	Waycross	196.8	316.7		US 84 west / SR 38 west (Victory Drive) – Homerville, Valdosta	Western end of US 84/SR 38 concurrency
Ware	Waycross	198.0	318.7		US 84 east (McDonald Street) / SR 38 east – Blackshear, Jesup, Savannah	Eastern end of US 84/SR 38 concurrency
Ware	Waycross	199.7	321.4		US 1 south / US 23 south / SR 4 south / US 1 Bus. north / US 23 Bus. north / SR 4 Bus. north (Memorial Drive) – Folkston, Downtown Business District	Eastern end of US 1/US 23/SR 4 concurrency; southern terminus of US 1 Bus./US 23 Bus./SR 4 Bus.
Ware		207.0	333.1		SR 177 south (Laura Walker Road) – Laura S. Walker State Park and Golf Course, Okefenokee Swamp Park, Georgia Lions Camp for the Blind	Northern terminus of SR 177
Brantley	Hoboken	212.3	341.7		SR 15 / SR 121 (Brantley Avenue) – Blackshear, Folkston	
Brantley	Nahunta	221.5	356.5		US 301 / SR 23 (Main Street) – Hortense, Jesup, Hickox, Folkston	
Brantley	Atkinson	229.3	369.0		SR 110 west to SR 32 / Old SR 259 – Jesup	Western end of SR 110 concurrency
Brantley	Atkinson	229.6	369.5		SR 110 east – Waverly, Woodbine	Eastern end of SR 110 concurrency
Glynn		239.3	385.1		SR 99 north – Darien	Southern terminus of SR 99
Glynn		247.5	398.3		US 17 south / SR 25 south / SR 303 north – Spring Bluff, Woodbine, Blythe Island	Western end of US 17/SR 25 concurrency; southern terminus of SR 303
Glynn		248.1	399.3		I-95 (SR 405) / US 82 ends – Savannah, Jacksonville	I-95 exit 29; eastern end of US 82 concurrency; eastern terminus of US 82
Glynn		253.5	408.0		US 17 north / SR 25 north – Brunswick	Eastern end of US 17/SR 25 concurrency
Glynn	Jekyll River	259.5	417.6	M. E. Thompson Bridge		
Glynn	Jekyll Island	260.1	418.6		Beach View Drive / Main Street	Eastern terminus; roundabout intersection
1.000 mi = 1.609 km; 1.000 km = 0.621 mi: Concurrency terminus; Incomplete access

== Related routes ==
=== Cusseta business loop ===
State Route 520 Business
- Location: Cusseta
- Length: 2.3 mi (3.7 km)
- Existed: 1988–2004

State Route 520 Business (SR 520 Bus.) was a business route of SR 520 that existed entirely within the city of Cusseta. It followed Broad Street through the city.

The road that would become SR 520 Bus. was established in 1972 as SR 55 Business, when the road that is now SR 520 was established as part of SR 55. In 1988, the same year that SR 520 was designated in Georgia, and SR 55 was decommissioned, SR 55 Bus. was redesignated as SR 520 Bus. In 2004, SR 520 Bus. was removed from the state highway system.

=== Albany business loop ===
State Route 520 Business
- Location: Albany
- Length: 11.7 mi (18.8 km)

State Route 520 Business (SR 520 Bus.) is a business route of SR 520 that exists almost entirely within the city limits of Albany. It follows North Slappey Boulevard and East Oglethorpe Boulevard through the city, and Sylvester Road east of the city. SR 520 Bus. travels entirely concurrently with US 82 Bus. and also has a concurrency with both US 19 Bus. and, briefly, with SR 234.
