= Georgia State Route 33 =

State highway in Georgia, United States

State Route 33
- SR 33 highlighted in red

Route information
- Maintained by GDOT
- Length: 81.29 mi (130.82 km)

Major junctions
- South end: US 84 / SR 38 in Boston
- US 319 / US 319 Bus. / SR 35 in Moultrie; US 319 / US 319 Bus. / SR 35 / SR 133 in Moultrie; US 82 / SR 112 / SR 520 in Sylvester
- North end: US 41 / SR 7 north of Wenona

Location
- Country: United States
- State: Georgia
- Counties: Thomas, Brooks, Colquitt, Worth, Crisp

Highway system
- Georgia State Highway System; Interstate; US; State; Special
← SR 32	→ SR 34

State Route 33 (SR 33) is an 81.29-mile-long (130.82 km) state highway that travels south-to-north through portions of Thomas, Brooks, Colquitt, Worth, and Crisp counties in the south-central part of the U.S. state of Georgia. The highway travels from its southern terminus, an intersection with US 84/SR 38 in Boston, to its northern terminus, an intersection with US 41/SR 7 north of Wenona. It also travels through Moultrie and Sylvester.

== Route description ==
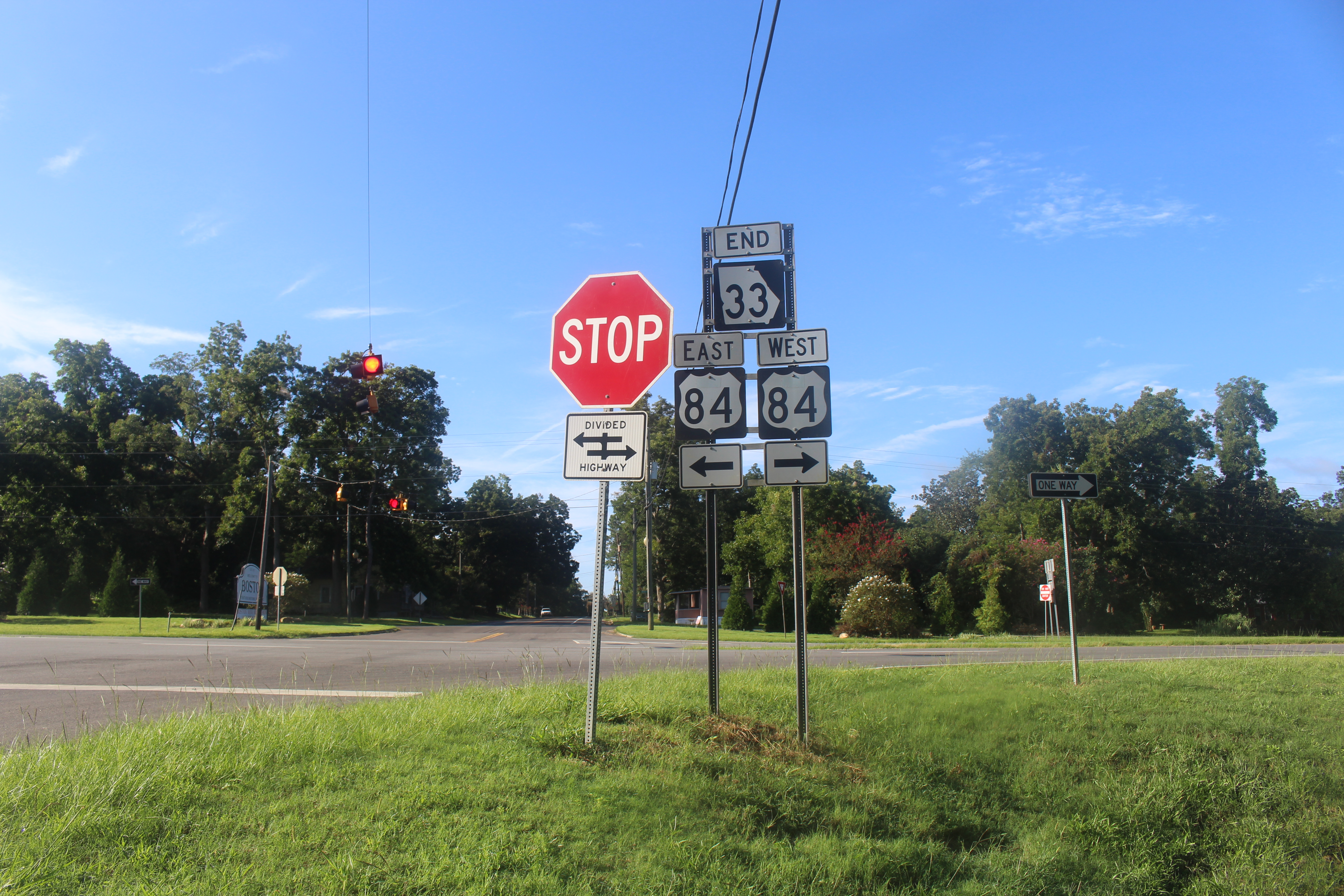
Southern terminus

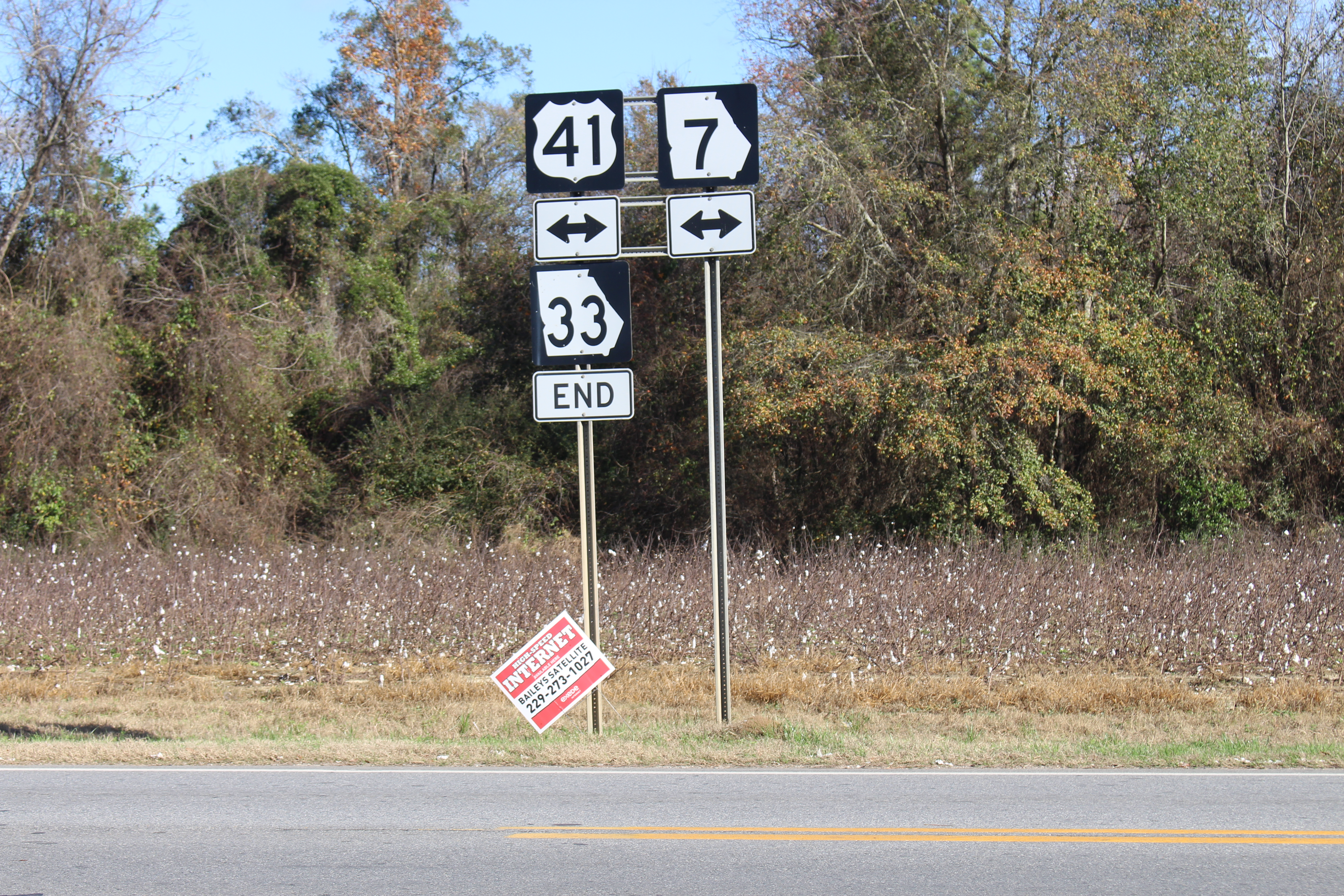
Northern terminus

SR 33 begins at an intersection with US 84/SR 38 in Boston. The highway travels north-northeast to Pavo. After a brief concurrency in Pavo with SR 122, SR 33 travels to the north-northwest. In the southern part of Moultrie, SR 33 begins a concurrency with US 319 Bus. on Thomasville Road. The two highways travel north, through downtown Moultrie. North of the city, US 319 Bus. ends, and, after a brief concurrency with SR 133, SR 33 continues north to Sylvester. In Sylvester, SR 33 has a brief concurrency with SR 112 before departing and continuing north to meet its northern terminus, an intersection with US 41/SR 7 just north of Wenona, which is south of Cordele.

The only portion of SR 33 that is part of the National Highway System, a system of routes determined to be the most important for the nation's economy, mobility, and defense, is the entire length of the US 319 Bus. concurrency in Moultrie and the entire length of the SR 133 concurrency north of the city.

== History ==
=== 1920s ===
SR 33 was established at least as early as 1919, from Thomasville northeast and north-northwest to Sylvester. At this time, SR 35 was established from the Florida state line south-southeast of Quitman to SR 33 in Moultrie. By the end of September 1921, the northern terminus of SR 33 was proposed to be extended north-northeast to SR 7 south of Cordele. The northern terminus of SR 35 was truncated to SR 33 in Pavo. By October 1926, the segment of SR 33 from Thomasville to Moultrie was shifted eastward to SR 35's former path from the Florida state line to Quitman, and then from Quitman north-northwest and northwest to Moultrie. The segment of SR 35 from the Florida state line to Moultrie was shifted westward to SR 33's former path from Thomasville to Moultrie. The northern terminus of SR 33 was extended on its proposed path, from Sylvester to the Cordele area. US 41 was designated on SR 7 in the Cordele area. By October 1929, the northern terminus of SR 35 was extended north-northwest and north-northeast to Sylvester, replacing the Moultrie–Sylvester segment of SR 33, splitting SR 33 into two parts.

=== 1930s to 1990s ===
By June 1930, the northern terminus of SR 35 was truncated to Moultrie, replaced by an extension of SR 33, which eliminated its split. In the first quarter of 1937, the entire length of SR 33 that existed at the time had a "completed hard surface". In the third quarter of 1939, SR 133 was extended on SR 35 south of Moultrie, south-southeast to SR 122 in Pavo, and south-southwest to US 84/SR 38 in Boston. In the second quarter of 1941, US 319 was designated on SR 35/SR 133 south of Moultrie and on all of SR 33 north of Moultrie. Between January 1945 and November 1946, US 319 was shifted eastward, off of SR 33, and onto SR 35. Between September 1953 and June 1954, the entire extension of SR 133, from Boston to Moultrie, was hard surfaced. In 1993, the path of SR 33 from Florida to Moultrie was shifted westward, replacing the Boston–Moultrie segment of SR 133. Its former segment was redesignated as SR 333, from the Florida state line to north of New Rock Hill, and an eastern rerouting of SR 133, from north of New Rock Hill to Moultrie.

== Major intersections ==
County	Location	mi	km	Destinations	Notes
Thomas	Boston	0.000	0.000	US 84 / SR 38 – Valdosta, Thomasville	Southern terminus
Thomas–Brooks county line	Pavo	11.995	19.304	SR 122 east – Barney, Hahira	Southern end of SR 122 concurrency
Thomas	Pavo	12.331	19.845	SR 122 west – Thomasville	Northern end of SR 122 concurrency
Thomas		13.456	21.655	SR 188 west – Coolidge	Eastern terminus of SR 188
Colquitt	Moultrie	23.683	38.114	US 319 / SR 35 (Veterans Parkway) / US 319 Bus. begins – Coolidge, Tifton, Moultrie Tech College	Southern end of US 319 Bus. concurrency; southern terminus of US 319 Bus.
Colquitt	Moultrie	28.244	45.454	SR 37 east (1st Avenue SE)	One-way pair
Colquitt	Moultrie	28.314	45.567	SR 37 west (East Central Avenue) to SR 111	One-way pair
Colquitt	Moultrie	29.418	47.344	SR 111 west – Meigs	Eastern terminus of SR 111
Colquitt	Moultrie	30.475	49.045	US 319 / SR 35 / SR 133 south (Veterans Parkway / Tifton Highway) – Thomasville, Tifton	Northern end of US 319 Bus. concurrency; northern terminus of US 319 Bus.; southern end of SR 133 concurrency
Colquitt		32.279	51.948	SR 133 north – Albany	Northern end of SR 133 concurrency
Colquitt		40.054	64.461	SR 270 west – Doerun	Eastern terminus of SR 270
Worth	Sylvester	53.953	86.829	SR 256 south (East Martin Luther King Jr. Drive) – Norman Park	Northern terminus of SR 256
Worth	Sylvester	54.416	87.574	US 82 / SR 112 south / SR 520 (Franklin Street) – Albany, Tifton	Southern end of SR 112 concurrency
Worth	Sylvester	54.892	88.340	SR 112 north (Ashburn Highway) – Ashburn	Northern end of SR 112 concurrency
Worth		65.268	105.039	SR 32 – Leesburg, Ashburn	
Crisp	Wenona	80.916	130.222	SR 33 Conn. east (Rockhouse Road East) to I-75 (SR 401) – Wenona	Western terminus of SR 33 Conn.
Crisp		81.286	130.817	US 41 / SR 7 – Ashburn, Cordele	Northern terminus
1.000 mi = 1.609 km; 1.000 km = 0.621 mi: Concurrency terminus

== Wenona connector route ==
State Route 33 Connector
- Location: Wenona
- Length: 1.78 mi (2.86 km)

State Route 33 Connector (SR 33 Conn.) is a 1.78-mile-long (2.86 km) connector route near Cordele. SR 33 Conn. connects the SR 33 mainline, as well as US 41/SR 7, with Interstate 75 via Rockhouse Road.

SR 33 Conn. begins at an intersection with the SR 33 mainline in Wenona. It travels to the east-northeast for approximately 0.2 miles (0.32 km), to an intersection with US 41/SR 7. It continues to the east-northeast and crosses over some railroad tracks of Norfolk Southern Railway. It curves to the east, and then resumes its east-northeast direction. At an interchange with I-75, SR 33 Conn. ends, and Rockhouse Road continues to the east-northeast.

Between Augusta 1950 and January 1952, Rockhouse Road was established on this path. In 1978, SR 33 Conn. was established on its current path.

The entire route is in Crisp County.

Location	mi	km	Destinations	Notes
Wenona	0.000	0.000	SR 33 – Sylvester	Western terminus
	0.181	0.291	US 41 / SR 7 – Cordele	
	1.776	2.858	I-75 (SR 401) / Rockhouse Road east – Valdosta, Macon	Eastern terminus; roadway continues as Rockhouse Road; I-75/SR 401 exit 97
1.000 mi = 1.609 km; 1.000 km = 0.621 mi
