= Little Ochlockonee River =

Coordinates: 31.2418°N 84.0130°W

Location
- Country: United States

Physical characteristics
- Source
  - location: Georgia

There are two streams named the Little Ochlockonee River in southern Georgia in the United States. Both are tributaries of the Ochlockonee River.

The longer of the two rises in eastern Mitchell County near Sale City and flows 32.1 miles (51.7 km) south, joining the Ochlockonee in Thomas County, about 6 miles (10 km) north of Thomasville. The smaller Little Ochlockonee River rises in Worth County north of Anderson City and flows south 8.8 miles (14.2 km) into Colquitt County, joining the Ochlockonee east of Doerun.

== See also ==
- List of rivers of Georgia
