= U.S. Route 84 in Georgia =

Segment of U.S. Highway in Georgia

U.S. Highway 84
- State Route 38; Wiregrass Georgia Parkway
- US 84 highlighted in red

Route information
- Maintained by GDOT
- Length: 259.36 mi (417.40 km)

Major junctions
- West end: US 84 at the Alabama state line near Saffold
- US 27 / SR 1 in Bainbridge; US 19 / US 319 / SR 3 / SR 35 / SR 300 in Thomasville; I-75 in Valdosta; US 1 / US 23 / US 82 / SR 4 / SR 520 in Waycross; US 17 / SR 25 in Midway
- East end: I-95 in Midway

Location
- Country: United States
- State: Georgia
- Counties: Early, Seminole, Decatur, Grady, Thomas, Brooks, Lowndes, Lanier, Clinch, Ware, Pierce, Wayne, Long, Liberty

Highway system
- United States Numbered Highway System; List; Special; Divided; Georgia State Highway System; Interstate; US; State; Special
← SR 83	→ SR 84
← SR 37	SR 38	→ SR 39
← SR 363	SR 364	→ SR 365

U.S. Route 84 (US 84) is a 259-mile-long (417 km) U.S. Highway in the U.S. state of Georgia, is also signed as State Route 38 for its entire length in Georgia. After entering Georgia from Alabama west-northwest of Jakin, the highway travels through the southern portion of the state, meeting its east end at Interstate 95 (I-95) east of Midway. US 84 through Georgia is also known as the Wiregrass Georgia Parkway.

== Route description ==
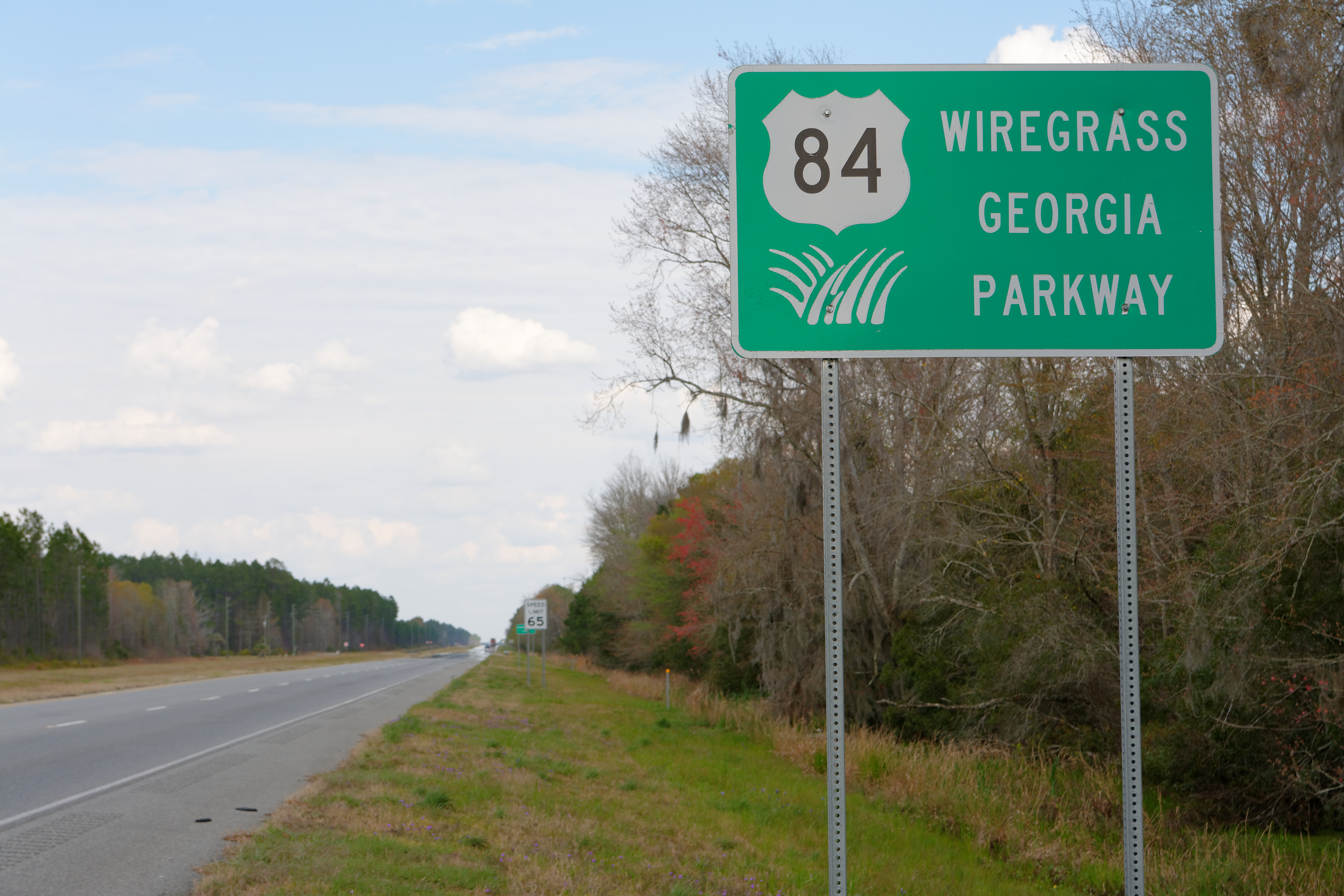
Wiregrass Georgia Parkway sign in Clinch County

After entering the state from Alabama, US 84/SR 38 travels east through Donalsonville to Bainbridge. The highways travel around the city to the south on a freeway bypass, cosigned with US 27/SR 1, where it has multiple exits such as with SR-97, US-84 BYP, and SR-253. The route continues east through Cairo to Thomasville, where it bypasses downtown to the north and east, concurrent with US 319 and SR 35, then US 19/SR 3/SR 300. The highway then continues east to Quitman, where it becomes concurrent with US 221/SR 76/SR 333 to the east, past its interchange with Interstate 75 (I-75), to Valdosta. In Valdosta, US 221 departs, and US 84/SR 38 continues east to Waycross, where it is briefly concurrent with US 1, US 23, US 82, SR 4, and SR 520. US 84/SR 38 continues east from Waycross, traveling through Blackshear before arriving in Jesup. In Jesup, the highway becomes concurrent with US 25, US 301, and SR 23 east to Ludowici. In Ludowici, US 25, US 301, and SR 23 depart to the northwest, and US 84/SR 38 continues east to Hinesville. In Hinesville, the highway becomes concurrent with SR 196, and takes a drastic turn to the east. A short distance later, SR 196 departs, and US 84/SR 38 continues east to exit 76 on I-95 east of Midway. Here, the roadway continues as Islands Highway.

The entire length of US 84 in Georgia is part of the National Highway System, a system of routes determined to be the most important for the nation's economy, mobility, and defense.

== History ==
Formerly, US 84 met its eastern terminus at US 17/SR 25 west of Brunswick, while US 82 followed the present alignment of US 84 to Midway. However, with the realignment of highways near Waycross, the terminus of the two highways were swapped. In addition, a segment of the highway between Boston and Quitman was relocated to a more northerly routing in 1966, with the former routing being renumbered as State Route 364. SR 364 was decommissioned in 1982.

== Major intersections ==
County	Location	mi	km	Destinations	Notes
Chattahoochee River		0.000	0.000	US 84 west (SR 12) / SR 38 begins – Dothan, Enterprise	Continuation into Alabama; western terminus of SR 38; western end of SR 38 concurrency
Early	Saffold	1.254	2.018	SR 370 north – Cedar Springs, G.P.	
Early	Jakin	4.958	7.979	Pearl Street	Former SR 39 Spur north
Seminole	Donalsonville	11.869	19.101	SR 91 Alt. (Wiley Avenue) to SR 39 – Colquitt, Albany, Malone, Historic Downtown, Newton	
Seminole	Donalsonville	12.064	19.415	SR 39 / SR 91 (Tennille Avenue) – Historic Downtown	
Seminole	Iron City	16.456	26.483	SR 45 north – Colquitt, Iron City	Southern terminus of SR 45
Decatur		20.997	33.791	SR 285 west to SR 39	Eastern terminus of SR 285
Decatur	Brinson	22.158	35.660	SR 310 – Colquitt, Lake Seminole, Brinson	
Decatur	Bainbridge	30.763	49.508	SR 253 Spur south – Marina	Northern terminus of SR 253 Spur
Decatur	Bainbridge	30.924	49.767	US 27 north (SR 1) / US 27 Bus. south / SR 1 Bus. south – Colquitt, Decatur County Industrial Air Park, Newton, Albany, Downtown Bainbridge, Historical District	Interchange; western end of US 27/SR 1 concurrency; northern terminus of US 27 Bus./SR 1 Bus.
Decatur	Bainbridge	31.608	50.868	SR 253 (Spring Creek Road)	Interchange
Decatur	Bainbridge	32.273	51.938	US 84 Bus. east / SR 38 Bus. east / South Old Quincy Road south / Boat Basin Circle east – Bainbridge	Interchange; western terminus of US 84 Bus./SR 38 Bus.; northern terminus of South Old Quincy Road; eastern terminus of Boat Basin Circle; South Old Quincy Road is former SR 97 Conn.
Decatur	Bainbridge	33.242– 33.440	53.498– 53.816	SR 97 (Faceville Highway) / SR 309 – Fowlstown, Faceville, Chattahoochee, Quincy	Interchange; eastbound exit/westbound entrance for SR 97, eastbound entrance/westbound exit for SR 309
Decatur	Bainbridge	34.052	54.801	US 27 south (Tallahassee Highway / SR 1) / US 27 Bus. north (SR 1 Bus.)	Interchange; eastern end of US 27/SR 1 concurrency; southern terminus of US 27 Bus./SR 1 Bus.
Decatur	Bainbridge	35.815	57.639	US 84 Bus. west / SR 38 Bus. west – Bainbridge	Eastern terminus of US 84 Bus./SR 38 Bus.
Decatur	Climax	42.758	68.812	SR 262 (McDonald Street) – Camilla, Pelham, Tallahassee	
Grady	Whigham	49.207	79.191	McGriff Street	Former SR 179
Grady	Cairo	55.819	89.832	SR 112 north – Camilla	Southern terminus of SR 112
Grady	Cairo	56.981	91.702	SR 93 / SR 111 (Broad Street) – Meigs, Pelham, Tallahassee, Business District	
Grady	Cairo	57.497	92.532	SR 188 (5th Street) – Ochlocknee, Business District	
Grady	Cairo	58.048	93.419	SR 38 Conn. west (1st Avenue Northeast) – Business District	Eastern terminus of SR 38 Spur
Thomas		67.601	108.793	Cairo Road – Downtown Thomasville	
Thomas		69.795	112.324	US 319 south / SR 35 south (West Thomasville Bypass) – Tallahassee	Western end of US 319/SR 35 concurrency
Thomas		70.164	112.918	US 84 Bus. east / SR 38 Bus. east / SR 3 Alt. north – Ochlocknee, Thomasville	Western end of SR 3 Alt. concurrency; western terminus of US 84 Bus./SR 38 Bus.
Thomas		72.837	117.220	US 319 north / SR 35 north (North Thomasville Bypass) / US 19 north / SR 3 north / SR 300 north (Georgia-Florida Parkway) – Moultrie, Albany	Eastern end of US 319/SR 35 and SR 3 Alt. concurrencies; western end of US 19/SR 3/SR 300 concurrency
Thomas	Thomasville	73.938	118.992	SR 35 Conn. north (East Jackson Street) – Thomasville, Moultrie, Airport	Southern terminus of SR 35 Conn.
Thomas	Thomasville	74.413	119.756	SR 122 east – Pavo, Airport	Western terminus of SR 122
Thomas	Thomasville	75.676	121.789	US 19 south / SR 3 south / SR 300 south / US 84 Bus. west / SR 38 Bus. west (Smith Avenue) – Monticello, FL, Thomasville	Interchange; eastern end of US 19/SR 3/SR 300 concurrency
Thomas	Boston	85.547	137.675	SR 33 north / Green Street – Moultrie, Barwick, Boston	Southern terminus of SR 33
Brooks	Quitman	99.131	159.536	US 221 south / SR 76 west / SR 333 south (South Court Street) – Perry, FL, Greenville, FL, Madison, FL	Western end of US 221 and SR 76/SR 333 concurrencies
Brooks	Quitman	99.296	159.801	SR 76 east / SR 333 north to SR 133 – Morven, Adel, Moultrie	Eastern end of SR 76/SR 333 concurrency
Lowndes	Valdosta	114.016	183.491	I-75 (SR 401) / I-75 BL begins – Macon, Lake City, Lake Park, Moody AFB	I-75 exit 16; southern terminus of I-75 Bus.; southern end of I-75 Bus. concurrency
Lowndes	Valdosta	114.831	184.803	SR 133 north (St. Augustine Road) – Moultrie, Airport	Southern terminus of SR 133
Lowndes	Valdosta	116.458	187.421	US 41 Bus. south / SR 7 Bus. south (Patterson Street) – Airport	Southbound lanes of US 41 Bus./SR 7 Bus. on one-way pair
Lowndes	Valdosta	116.518	187.518	US 41 Bus. north / SR 7 Bus. north (North Ashley Street) / I-75 BL north	Northbound lanes of US 41 Bus./SR 7 Bus. on one-way pair; northern end of I-75 Bus. concurrency
Lowndes	Valdosta	119.692	192.626	US 41 / US 221 north / SR 7 / SR 31 (Inner Perimeter Road) to I-75 – Lakeland, Moody AFB	Eastern end of US 221 concurrency
Lowndes	Naylor	129.531	208.460	SR 135 – Lakeland, Howell	
Lanier	Stockton	134.108	215.826	US 129 / SR 11 – Lakeland, Mayday	
Clinch		148.693	239.298	SR 37 west – Lakeland	Eastern terminus of SR 37
Clinch	Homerville	151.461	243.753	US 441 / SR 89 (Church Street) – Pearson, Fargo, Stephen C. Foster State Park	
Ware	Waycross	177.209	285.190	US 1 north / US 23 north / US 82 west / SR 4 north / SR 520 west (South Georgia Parkway) – Tifton, Pearson, Waycross College	Western end of US 1/US 23/US 82/SR 4/SR 520 concurrency
Ware	Waycross	178.380	287.075	US 1 south / US 23 south / US 82 east / SR 4 south / SR 520 east (South Georgia Parkway) – Nahunta, Jekyll Island, Brunswick	Eastern end of US 1/US 23/US 82/SR 4/SR 520 concurrency
Ware	Waycross	179.058	288.166	US 1 Bus. south / US 23 Bus. south / SR 4 Bus. south (Memorial Drive) – Brunswick, Folkston, Jacksonville, Waycross College	Western end of US 1 Bus./US 23 Bus./SR 4 Bus. concurrency
Ware	Waycross	179.249	288.473	US 1 Bus. north / US 23 Bus. north / SR 4 Bus. north (State Street) – Alma, Augusta	Eastern end of US 1 Bus./US 23 Bus./SR 4 Bus. concurrency
Pierce	Blackshear	188.436	303.258	SR 15 / SR 121 – Bristol, Hoboken	
Pierce	Patterson	196.731	316.608	SR 32 (Main Street) – Alma, Brunswick	
Wayne		212.712	342.327	SR 203 south – Alma	Northern terminus of SR 203
Wayne	Jesup	219.473	353.208	US 341 / SR 27 (West Pine Street) to I-95 – Baxley, Brunswick, Altamaha Tech	
Wayne	Jesup	221.002	355.668	US 25 south / US 301 south / SR 23 south – Nahunta, Brunswick, Federal Correctional Institute, Wayne County Jail	Interchange; western end of US 25/US 301/SR 23 concurrency
Long	Ludowici	230.703	371.280	US 25 north / US 301 north / SR 23 north / SR 57 (Main Street) to I-95 – Glennville, Darien, Ludowici Well Pavilion Historic Site, Historic Jones Creek Baptist Church	Eastern end of US 25/US 301/SR 23 concurrency
Liberty	Walthourville	238.514	383.851	SR 119 – Glennville, Riceboro, Fort Stewart Commercial Trucks, Savannah Technical College Liberty Campus	
Liberty	Hinesville	243.049	391.149	SR 196 west (Veterans Parkway)	Western end of SR 196 concurrency
Liberty	Hinesville	243.851	392.440	General Screven Road – Fort Stewart, Pembroke	Former SR 196 west
Liberty	Hinesville	245.322	394.807	SR 38 Conn. west (General Stewart Way)	Eastern terminus of SR 38 Conn.
Liberty	McIntosh	249.944	402.246	SR 196 east (Leroy Coffer Highway) – Savannah	Eastern end of SR 196 concurrency
Liberty	Midway	255.519	411.218	US 17 / SR 25 – Riceboro, Richmond Hill, Colonial Midway Museum, Geechee Kunda Arts Center & Museum	
Liberty	Midway	259.358	417.396	I-95 (SR 405) / SR 38 ends – Savannah, Jacksonville	I-95 exit 76; eastern terminus of US 84 and SR 38; eastern end of SR 38 concurrency; road continues as Islands Hwy
1.000 mi = 1.609 km; 1.000 km = 0.621 mi: Concurrency terminus; Incomplete access

== Related routes ==
=== U.S. Route 84 Business (Bainbridge) ===
U.S. Highway 84 Business
- Shotwell Street
- Location: Bainbridge
- Length: 2.8 mi (4.5 km)

U.S. Route 84 Business (US 84 Bus.) in Bainbridge follows the former routing of US 84/SR 38 through downtown, traveling west to east from both ends of the mainline route around the city. It is entirely concurrent with SR 38 Bus. The business route is known as Shotwell Street for its entire length.

US 84 Bus. and SR 38 Bus. begin at an interchange with US 27/US 84/SR 1/SR 38 in the central part of the city. At this interchange, the road continues as South Old Quincy Road, which is former SR 97 Conn. There is also Boat Basin Circle, which is the main entrance to Earle May Recreation Area. They travel to the east and cross over some railroad tracks of CSX. They intersect South Bruton Street, which leads to Cheney Griffin Park. At West Street, SR 97/SR 309 join the concurrency. One block later, at Broad Street, SR 97/SR 309 depart the concurrency, and US 27 Bus./SR 1 Bus. join. On the southeastern corner of the intersection with Monroe Street lies the Gilbert H. Gragg Library. At Scott Street, US 27 Bus./SR 1 Bus. leave the concurrency. Between North Thornatiska Drive and South Wheat Avenue, they pass Jones Wheat Elementary School. Between South Wheat Avenue and Gordon Avenue, they pass Memorial Hospital and Manor. Just to the east of Gordon Avenue, the highways curve to the east-southeast before meeting their eastern terminus, an intersection with US 84/SR 38 (Thomasville Road).

The entire route is in Bainbridge, Decatur County.

mi	km	Destinations	Notes
0.0– 0.3	0.0– 0.48	US 27 / US 84 (SR 1 / SR 38) / South Old Quincy Road south / Boat Basin Circle west – Colquitt, Donalsonville, Cairo, Havana, Tallahassee	Western end of SR 38 Bus. concurrency; western terminus of US 84 Bus. and SR 38 Bus.; northern terminus of South Old Quincy Road; eastern terminus of Boat Basin Circle; interchange; South Old Quincy Road is former SR 97 Conn. south.
0.8	1.3	SR 97 south / SR 309 south (West Street) – Chattahoochee, Havana, Fla.	Western end of SR 97/SR 309 concurrency
0.8	1.3	US 27 Bus. north / SR 97 north / SR 309 north (SR 1 Bus. north / Broad Street)	Eastern end of SR 97/SR 309 concurrency; western end of US 27 Bus./SR 1 Bus. concurrency
1.3	2.1	US 27 Bus. south (SR 1 Bus. south / Scott Street) – Attapulgus, Tallahassee	Eastern end of US 27 Bus./SR 1 Bus. concurrency
2.8– 2.8	4.5– 4.5	US 84 (SR 38 / Thomasville Road) / SR 38 Bus. ends – Donalsonville, Cairo, Climax, Dothan, Ala., Quincy, Seminole State Park	Eastern end of SR 38 Bus. concurrency; eastern terminus of US 84 Bus. and SR 38 Bus.
1.000 mi = 1.609 km; 1.000 km = 0.621 mi: Concurrency terminus

=== State Route 38 Connector (Cairo) ===
State Route 38 Connector
- Location: Cairo, Georgia
- Length: 0.5 mi (800 m)

State Route 38 Connector (SR 38 Conn) is a short west–east connector route in Cairo along 1st Avenue NE connecting SR 93/SR 111 in downtown with the US 84/SR 38 mainline in the eastern part of the city. The route was previously known as SR 38 Spur and extended west to Broad Street.

The entire route is in Cairo, Grady County.

mi	km	Destinations	Notes
0.0	0.0	SR 93 / SR 111 (5th Street NE) – Tallahassee	Western terminus
0.4	0.64	US 84 / SR 38 (38th Boulevard NE) / Tired Creek Boulevard north – Bainbridge, Thomasville	Eastern terminus
1.000 mi = 1.609 km; 1.000 km = 0.621 mi

=== U.S. Route 84 Business (Thomasville) ===
U.S. Highway 84 Business
- Location: Thomasville
- Length: 4.9 mi (7.9 km)

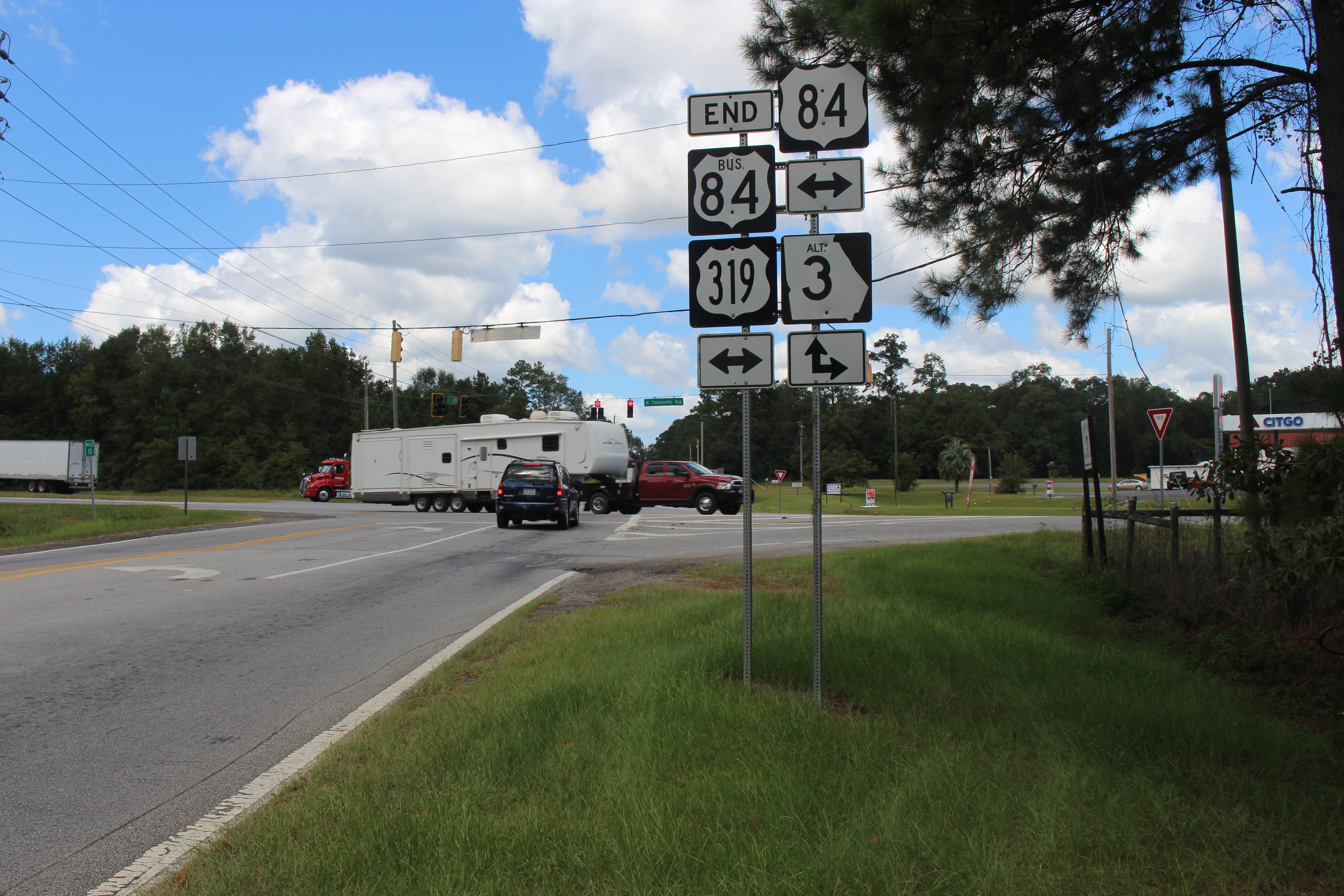
Northern terminus of US 84 Bus. north of Thomasville

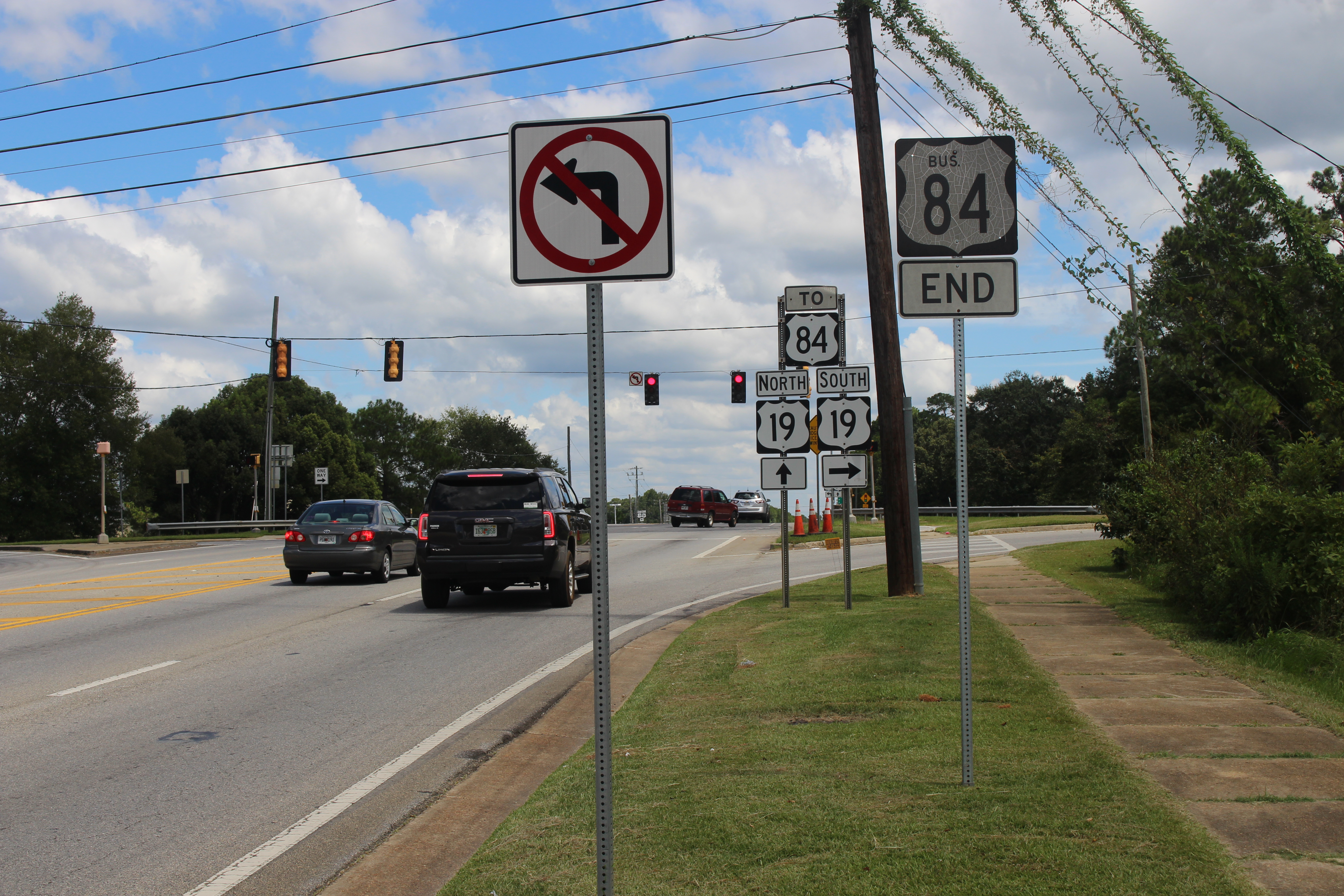
Eastern terminus of US 84 Bus. east of Thomasville

U.S. Route 84 Business (US 84 Bus.) is a 4.9-mile-long (7.9 km) business route of US 84 that mostly exists within the city limits of Thomasville. It follows the former routing of US 84/SR 38 through the city. It is entirely concurrent with SR 38 Bus. and travels near the Lapham–Patterson House State Historic Site. Both ends of the highway are just outside of the city limits of Thomasville.

US 84 Bus. and SR 38 Bus. begin at an intersection with US 84/US 319/SR 35/SR 38 just north-northwest of the city limits. Here, the roadway continues as SR 3 Alternate (SR 3 Alt.). They travel to the south-southeast, with the local name of Old Albany Road, through rural areas, and enter the city. Just before intersecting the eastern terminus of Plantation Oak Drive, they begin a very gradual curve to a nearly due-south direction. The highway becomes increasingly more residential. Just before intersecting the western terminus of Meadow Street, they curve back to the south-southeast. They curve to the southeast and take on the North Boulevard name. North Boulevard splits off to the east, while US 84 Bus./SR 38 Bus. curve to the southeast, onto Madison Street. Between Crystal Street and Walcott Street, they travel on a bridge over some railroad tracks of CSX and Merrill Street. They then enter the main part of the city. An intersection with Calhoun Street leads to the Jack Hadley Black History Museum. On the western side of the intersection with Washington Street lies the Thomas County Judicial Center. They intersect Jackson Street, which is the former path of US 319 Bus./SR 35 Bus. The two highways turn left onto Smith Avenue and take it to the northeast. At the intersection with Broad Street, which is the former path of US 19 Bus., they curve to the east. Just east of Cherokee Street, they cross over some railroad tracks of CSX. At the northern terminus of Susie Way, they pass a complex that contains courts, magistrate, jail, police department, and sheriff's office. Between Susie Way and the southern terminus of Covington Avenue, they pass to the south of Cherokee Lake. Covington Avenue leads to the Thomasville Rose Garden.

The entire route is in Thomas County.

Location	mi	km	Destinations	Notes
	0.0	0.0	US 84 / US 319 (SR 35 / SR 38 / North Thomasville Bypass) / SR 3 Alt. / Dixie Highway north to US 19 – Cairo, Meigs, Cairo, Quitman SR 38 Bus. begins	Western end of SR 38 Bus. and Dixie Highway Scenic Byway concurrencies; western terminus of US 84 Bus. and SR 38 Bus.
Thomasville	2.6	4.2	Dixie Highway south (Jackson Street)	Former US 319 Bus./SR 35 Bus.; eastern end of Dixie Highway Scenic Byway concurrency
Thomasville	2.8	4.5	Broad Street	Former US 19 Bus.
	4.9	7.9	US 19 / SR 300 (SR 3 / Georgia–Florida Parkway) / US 84 (SR 38 / Wiregrass Georgia Parkway) – Monticello, Meigs, Cairo, Quitman, Boston SR 38 Bus. ends	Eastern end of SR 38 Bus. concurrency; eastern terminus of US 84 Bus. and SR 38 Bus.; interchange
1.000 mi = 1.609 km; 1.000 km = 0.621 mi: Concurrency terminus

=== State Route 364 ===
State Route 364
- Old US 84
- Location: Boston–Quitman
- Length: 15.9 mi (25.6 km)
- Existed: 1966–1982

State Route 364 (SR 364), also known as Old US 84, was a 15.9-mile-long (25.6 km) east–west state highway that was located in the southern part of the state. It traversed portions of Thomas and Brooks counties. In 1966, it was established from US 84/SR 38 west of Boston to US 84/SR 38 west of Quitman. In 1982, it was decommissioned.

Major intersections

County	Location	mi	km	Destinations	Notes
Thomas		0.0	0.0	US 84 / SR 38 – Valdosta, Thomasville	Western terminus of SR 364
Thomas	Boston	2.1	3.4	SR 133 (Green Street) – Monticello, Fla, Moultrie, Barwick	
Brooks		15.9	25.6	US 84 / SR 38 – Valdosta, Thomasville	Eastern terminus of SR 364
1.000 mi = 1.609 km; 1.000 km = 0.621 mi

=== State Route 38 Connector (Hinesville) ===
State Route 38 Connector
- Location: Hinesville
- Length: 1.7 mi (2.7 km)

State Route 38 Connector (SR 38 Conn.) is a short west–east connecting route of SR 38. It connects SR 119 on the Hinesville–Fort Stewart line with US 84/SR 38/SR 196 in northeast Hinesville just west of the Hinesville–Flemington line. It is known as General Stewart Way for its entire length. The entire length of SR 38 Conn. is part of the National Highway System.

The entire route is in Liberty County.

Location	mi	km	Destinations	Notes
Fort Stewart–Hinesville line	0.0	0.0	SR 119 (General Screven Way) / Saunders Avenue west	Western terminus of SR 38 Conn.; eastern terminus of Saunders Avenue
Hinesville	1.7	2.7	US 84 / SR 38 / SR 196 (Oglethorpe Highway) – Midway, Ludowici	Eastern terminus
1.000 mi = 1.609 km; 1.000 km = 0.621 mi

== See also ==
- Special routes of U.S. Route 84

U.S. Route 84
Previous state: Alabama	Georgia	Next state: Terminus
