= Wenona, Georgia =

- Unincorporated community Census-designated place
- Location within Georgia Location within the United States
- Coordinates: 31°54′16″N 83°45′49″W
- Country: United States
- State: Georgia
- County: Crisp

Area
  - Total: 2.86 sq mi (7.42 km^{2})
  - Land: 2.83 sq mi (7.34 km^{2})
  - Water: 0.027 sq mi (0.07 km^{2})
- Elevation: 338 ft (103 m)

Population (2020)
  - Total: 231
  - Density: 81.5/sq mi (31.45/km^{2})
- Time zone: UTC-5 (Eastern (EST))
  - Summer (DST): UTC-4 (EDT)
- ZIP Code: 31015 (Cordele)
- Area code: 229
- FIPS code: 13-81208
- GNIS feature ID: 2812675

Wenona is an unincorporated community and census-designated place (CDP) in Crisp County, Georgia, United States. It is on U.S. Route 41 where it is joined by Georgia State Route 33, 4 miles (6 km) south of Cordele, the county seat, and 5 miles (8 km) north of Arabi. Interstate 75 forms the eastern border of the CDP, with access from Exit 97.

The 2020 census listed a population of 231.

== Demographics ==
Historical population
Census	Pop.	Note	%±
2020	231		—
U.S. Decennial Census; 2020

Wenona was first listed as a census designated place in the 2020 U.S. census.

=== 2020 census ===
Wenona CDP, Georgia – Racial and ethnic composition Note: the US Census treats Hispanic/Latino as an ethnic category. This table excludes Latinos from the racial categories and assigns them to a separate category. Hispanics/Latinos may be of any race.
Race / Ethnicity (NH = Non-Hispanic)	Pop 2020	% 2020
White alone (NH)	152	65.80%
Black or African American alone (NH)	64	27.71%
Native American or Alaska Native alone (NH)	0	0.00%
Asian alone (NH)	1	0.43%
Pacific Islander alone (NH)	0	0.00%
Some Other Race alone (NH)	0	0.00%
Mixed Race or Multi-Racial (NH)	8	3.46%
Hispanic or Latino (any race)	6	2.60%
Total	231	100.00%
