= Georgia State Route 35 =

State highway in Georgia

State Route 35

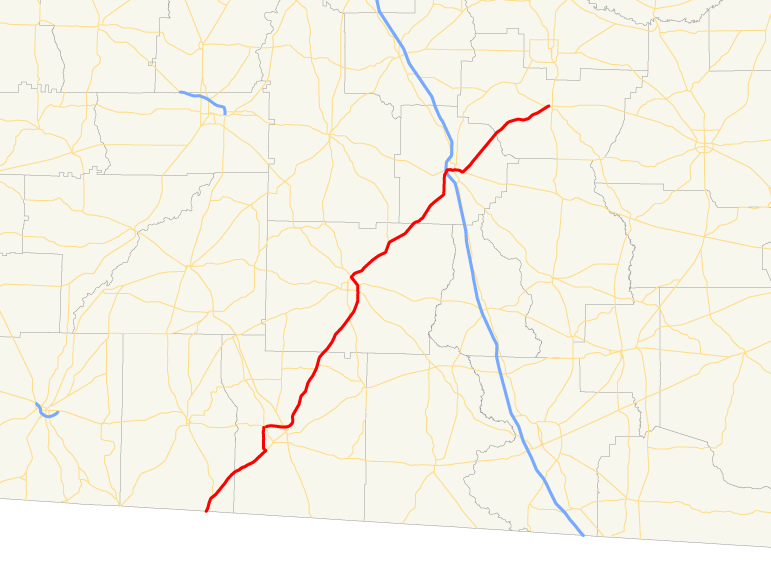
- SR 35 highlighted in red

Route information
- Maintained by GDOT
- Length: 89 mi (143 km)

Major junctions
- South end: US 319 / SR 61 at the Florida state line south of Cairo
- SR 93 southeast of Cairo; US 19 / US 84 / SR 3 / SR 300 / SR 38 in Thomasville; SR 188 in Coolidge; SR 33 in Moultrie; SR 37 / SR 133 in Moultrie; SR 256 in Norman Park; I-75 / US 82 / SR 520 in Tifton; US 41 / SR 7 / SR 125 in Tifton
- North end: US 319 / US 129 / SR 32 in Ocilla

Location
- Country: United States
- State: Georgia
- Counties: Grady, Thomas, Tift, Irwin

Highway system
- Georgia State Highway System; Interstate; US; State; Special
← SR 34	→ SR 36

State Route 35 (SR 35) is a state highway that runs southwest-to-northeast through portions of Grady, Thomas, Colquitt, Tift, and Irwin counties in south-central Georgia. The route runs from its southwestern terminus at U.S. Route 319 (US 319) and SR 61 at the Florida state line south of Cairo to its northeastern terminus at US 319 and SR 32 in Ocilla. The route runs concurrently with US 319 for its entire length.

== Route description ==
From its southern terminus at State Road 61 at the Florida state line south of Cairo in Grady County, SR 35, concurrent with US 319, travels northeast into Thomas County. The two routes arc to the west and north around Thomasville, briefly becoming concurrent with US 84/SR 38 and SR 3 Alternate. This road crosses US 19 before turning left on SR 35 Connector. SR 35 continues northeasterly through Colquitt County, bypassing Moultrie to the east, and enters Tift County. After an interchange with Interstate 75 (I-75) and a brief concurrency with US 82/SR 520 in Tifton, SR 35 continues northeastward into Irwin County, where SR 35 meets its northern terminus at SR 32 in Ocilla. US 319 continues northward.

SR 35 is a significant route in south Georgia, with an average annual daily traffic (AADT) of over 5,000 vehicles south of Tifton, and over 10,000 near Moultrie and Thomasville.

== Major intersections ==
County	Location	mi	km	Destinations	Notes
Florida–Georgia state line		0.000	0.000	US 319 south / SR 61 south	Southern end of US 319 concurrency; continuation into Florida
Grady	Beachton	2.251	3.623	SR 93 north – Cairo	Southern terminus of SR 93
Thomas	Thomasville			Metcalf Road – Metcalf	Former SR 122 west
Thomas		17.023	27.396	US 84 west (North Thomasville Bypass) / SR 38 west / Dixie Highway north – Cairo	Southern end of US 84/SR 38 concurrency; southern terminus of Dixie Highway Scenic Byway
Thomas				US 84 Bus. east / SR 38 Bus. east / SR 3 Alt. north / Dixie Highway – Ochlocknee, Thomasville	Southern end of SR 3 Alt. concurrency
Thomas		20.057	32.279	US 19 / US 84 east / SR 3 / SR 38 east / SR 300 (Georgia-Florida Parkway) – Albany, Valdosta, Thomasville	Northern end of US 84/SR 38 and SR 3 Alt. concurrencies
Thomas	Thomasville			SR 35 Conn. south (East Jackson Street) – Downtown Thomasville	Northern terminus of SR 35 Conn.
Thomas	Coolidge	31.375	50.493	SR 188 (Japonica Avenue) – Cairo, Pavo	
Colquitt	Moultrie	40.498	65.175	US 319 Bus. north / SR 33 (Thomasville Road north / Pavo Road south) – Moultrie, Pavo	Southern terminus of US 319 Bus.
Colquitt	Moultrie	45.048	72.498	SR 37 west / SR 133 south (1st Avenue Southeast) – Quitman, Moultrie, Camilla, Shorterville	Southern end of SR 37 and SR 133 concurrencies
Colquitt	Moultrie	45.788	73.689	SR 37 east – Adel, Reed Bingham State Park	Northern end of SR 37 concurrency
Colquitt	Moultrie	47.578	76.569	US 319 Bus. south / SR 33 / SR 133 north (Tifton Highway / East Bypass) – Sylvester, Albany, Moultrie	Northern end of SR 133 concurrency; northern terminus of US 319 Bus.
Colquitt	Norman Park	55.288	88.977	SR 256 north – Sylvester	Southern terminus of SR 256
Tift		65.487	105.391	SR 35 Loop east to I-75 – Valdosta, Macon	Western terminus of SR 35 Loop and Old Omega Road
Tift	Tifton	65.829	105.942	US 82 west / SR 520 west to I-75 – Albany, Sylvester, Macon, Valdosta	Southern end of US 82/SR 520 concurrency
Tift	Tifton	66.983	107.799	US 41 / SR 7 / SR 125 (Main Street) – Adel, Nashville, Ashburn, Fitzgerald	
Tift		68.383	110.052	US 82 east / SR 520 east – Brookfield, Alapaha, Waycross	Northern end of US 82/SR 520 concurrency
Irwin	Ocilla	85.390	137.422	SR 32 west to I-75 – Ashburn, Leesburg, Jefferson Davis State Historic Site	Southern end of SR 32 concurrency
Irwin	Ocilla	85.941	138.309	US 319 north / US 129 / SR 32 east / SR 11 / SR 90 – Douglas, Alapaha, South Georgia College	Northern end of US 319 and SR 32 concurrencies; northern terminus of SR 35
1.000 mi = 1.609 km; 1.000 km = 0.621 mi: Concurrency terminus

== Special routes ==
=== Thomasville connector route ===
State Route 35 Connector
- Location: Thomasville
- Length: 1.1 mi (1.8 km)

State Route 35 Connector (SR 35 Conn.) is a 1.1-mile-long (1.8 km) connector route for SR 35 in the northeastern part of the Thomasville area. Its southern terminus is at US 19, US 84, SR 3, SR 38, and SR 300 in the northeastern part of Thomasville. Its northern terminus is at US 319/SR 35 northeast of the city. This highway used to be US 319 Bus./SR 35 Bus. in the city.

The entire route is in Thomas County.

Location	mi	km	Destinations	Notes
Thomasville	0.0	0.0	US 19 / SR 300 (US 84 / SR 3 / SR 38) / East Jackson Street west – Quitman, Monticello, Thomasville, Southern Regional Tech College	Southern terminus; roadway continues as East Jackson Street.
	1.1	1.8	US 319 (SR 35 / North Thomasville Bypass west / Moultrie Road north) to US 84 west – Cairo, Moultrie, Tallahassee	Northern terminus; roadway continues as US 319 north/SR 35 north (Moultrie Road).
1.000 mi = 1.609 km; 1.000 km = 0.621 mi

=== Thomasville business loop ===
State Route 35 Business
- Location: Thomasville
- Existed: 2007

State Route 35 Business (SR 35 Bus.) was a business route for SR 35 that served the downtown area of Thomasville. The route was decommissioned in 2007.

=== Tifton connector route ===
State Route 35 Connector
- Location: Tifton
- Length: 0.4 mi (640 m)

State Route 35 Connector (SR 35 Conn.) is a 0.4-mile-long (0.64 km) connector route for SR 35 that exists on the southwestern edge of the city limits of Tifton. It connects US 319/SR 35 to Interstate 75 (I-75). This interchange with I-75 is on the Tifton–Phillipsburg line. SR 35 Conn. is known as Old Omega Road for its entire length.

The entire route is in Tift County.

Location	mi	km	Destinations	Notes
	0.0	0.0	US 319 / SR 35 (Alabama Avenue)	Western terminus
Tifton–Phillipsburg line	0.3– 0.4	0.48– 0.64	I-75 (SR 401) / Magnolia Drive north / Old Omega Road east – Valdosta, Macon	Eastern terminus of SR 35 Loop; southern terminus of Magnolia Drive; roadway continues as Old Omega Road.
1.000 mi = 1.609 km; 1.000 km = 0.621 mi
