= List of U.S. Highways in Georgia =

United States Numbered Highways of the Georgia State Route System
- Highway markers used in Georgia
- U.S. Highways in Georgia highlighted in red

System information
- Maintained by GDOT
- Formed: November 11, 1926

Highway names
- US Highways: U.S. Route nn (US nn)

System links
- Georgia State Highway System; Interstate; US; State; Special

The U.S. Routes in Georgia comprise the following current and former United States Numbered Highways in the U.S. state of Georgia.

== U.S. Routes ==
Number	Length (mi)	Length (km)	Southern or western terminus	Northern or eastern terminus	Formed	Removed	Notes
US 1	222.90	358.72	US 1 / US 23 / US 301 / SR 4 / SR 15 at Florida state line	US 1 / US 25 / US 78 / US 278 / SR 10 / SR 121 / SC 121 at South Carolina state line	1926	current	
US 11	22.92	36.89	US 11 / SR 58 at Alabama state line	US 11 / SR 58 at Tennessee state line	1926	current	Completely concurrent with SR 58
US 17	124.20	199.88	US 17 / SR 25 at Florida state line	US 17 / SR 404 Spur at South Carolina state line	1926	current	
US 19	348	560	US 19 / SR 3 / SR 300 at Florida state line	US 19 / US 129 / SR 11 at North Carolina state line	1926	current	
US 23	391.69	630.36	US 1 / US 23 / US 301 / SR 4 / SR 15 at Florida state line	US 23 / US 441 / SR 15 at North Carolina state line	1930	current	
US 25	190.0	305.8	US 17 / SR 25 / SR 25 Conn. in Brunswick, Georgia	US 1 / US 25 / US 78 / US 278 / SR 10 / SR 121 / SC 121 at South Carolina state line	1929	current	
US 27	356.088	573.068	US 27 / SR 1 at Florida state line	US 27 / SR 1 at Tennessee state line	1926	current	Completely concurrent with SR 1
US 29	208.00	334.74	US 29 / SR 14 at Alabama state line	US 29 / SR 8 at South Carolina state line	1926	current	
US 41	387	623	US 41 / SR 7 at Florida state line	US 41 / US 76 / SR 3 at Tennessee state line	1926	current	
US 41E	—	—	—	—	—	—	
US 41E	—	—	—	—	—	—	
US 41W	—	—	—	—	—	—	
US 76	150.7	242.5	US 41 / US 76 / SR 3 at Tennessee state line	US 76 / SR 2 at South Carolina state line	—	—	
US 78	233.3	375.5	US 78 / SR 8 at Alabama state line	US 1 / US 25 / US 78 / US 278 / SR 10 / SR 121 / SC 121 at South Carolina state line	1926	current	
US 78N	—	—	US 78N at Alabama state line	US 78 / US 78S in Villa Rica	1926	1934	Replaced by US 78
US 78S	—	—	US 78S at Alabama state line	US 78 / US 78N in Villa Rica	1926	1934	Replaced by US 78 Alt.
US 80	296.00	476.37	US 80 / SR 22 at Alabama state line	SR 26 / 16th Street in Tybee Island	1926	current	
US 82	232.0	373.4	US 82 / SR 50 at Alabama state line	I-95 / US 17 / SR 25 / SR 520 in Brunswick	1948	current	
US 84	258.00	415.21	US 84 / SR 38 at Alabama state line	I-95 / SR 38 in Midway	—	—	Completely concurrent with SR 38
US 123	17.70	28.49	US 23 / US 441 / SR 365 near Clarkesville, Georgia	US 123 / SR 365 at South Carolina state line	1926	current	Completely concurrent with SR 365
US 129	375.00	603.50	US 129 / SR 11 at Florida state line	US 19 / US 129 / SR 11 at North Carolina state line	—	—	
US 221	264.91	426.33	US 221 / SR 76 at Florida state line	US 221 / SR 150 at South Carolina state line	—	—	
US 278	235.4	378.8	US 278 / SR 6 at Alabama state line	US 1 / US 25 / US 78 / US 278 / SR 10 / SR 121 / SC 121 at South Carolina state line	—	—	
US 280	251.00	403.95	US 280 / SR 520 at Alabama state line	US 80 / SR 26 / SR 30 in Blichton	—	—	
US 301	170.00	273.59	US 1 / US 23 / US 301 / SR 4 / SR 15 at Florida state line	US 301 / SR 73 at South Carolina state line	1926	current	
US 319	206.261	331.945	US 319 / SR 35 at Florida state line	US 1 / SR 4 / SR 78 in Wadley	1937	current	
US 341	226	364	US 17 / SR 25 / SR 27 in Brunswick	US 41 / SR 7 / SR 18 in Barnesville	1926	current	
US 378	23.30	37.50	US 78 / US 78 Bus. / SR 10 / SR 10 Bus. / SR 17 / SR 17 Bus. / SR 47 in Washington	US 378 / SR 43 at South Carolina state line	1952	current	
US 411	99.70	160.45	US 411 / SR 53 at Alabama state line	US 411 / SR 61 at Tennessee state line	1934	current	
US 441	354.20	570.03	US 441 / SR 89 at Florida state line	US 23 / US 441 / SR 15 at North Carolina state line	1926	current	
Former

== Special routes ==
Number	Length (mi)	Length (km)	Southern or western terminus	Northern or eastern terminus	Formed	Removed	Notes
US 1 Bus.	9.622	15.485	US 1 / US 23 / US 23 Bus. / US 82 / SR 4 / SR 4 Bus. / SR 520 in Waycross	US 1 / US 23 / US 23 Bus. / SR 4 / SR 4 Bus. northwest of Waycross	1996	current	Completely concurrent with US 23 Bus./SR 4 Bus.; replaced former path of US 1/US 23/SR 4
US 1 Bus.	7.876	12.675	US 1 / SR 4 / SR 4 Bus. / SR 57 south of Swainsboro	US 1 / SR 4 / SR 4 Bus. north-northwest of Swainsboro	2004	current	Completely concurrent with SR 4 Bus.
US 1 Bus.	3.645	5.866	US 1 / SR 4 / SR 4 Bus. south of Wadley	US 1 / SR 4 / SR 4 Bus. north of Wadley	1967	current	Completely concurrent with SR 4 Bus.
US 1 Bus.	2.900	4.667	US 1 / SR 4 / SR 4 Bus. in Louisville	US 1 / US 221 / SR 4 / SR 4 Bus. in Louisville	1967	current	Completely concurrent with SR 4 Bus.
US 17 Alt.	—	—	US 17 / SR 25 / SR 25 Spur in Savannah	US 17 / US 80 / SR 25 / SR 25 Spur / SR 26 in Savannah	1951	1953	Completely concurrent with SR 25 Spur
US 17 Alt.	—	—	I-516 / US 17 / US 80 / SR 21 / SR 25 / SR 25 Alt. / SR 26 in Savannah	US 17 Alt. / SR 25 Alt. at the South Carolina state line in Port Wentworth	1954	1991	Completely concurrent with SR 25 Alt.
US 19 Bus.	—	—	US 19 / SR 333 southeast of Thomasville	US 19 / SR 3 / SR 111 in Meigs	1963	1986	Later, the northern terminus was truncated to just east of Ochlocknee.
US 19 Bus.	7.0	11.3	US 19 / US 82 / US 82 Bus. / SR 3 / SR 133 / SR 300 / SR 520 / SR 520 Bus. in Albany	US 19 / US 82 / US 82 Bus. / SR 3 / SR 520 / SR 520 Bus. in Albany	—	—	Completely concurrent with US 82 Bus./SR 520 Bus.
US 19 Byp.	1.8	2.9	US 19 / SR 3 / SR 3 Byp. / SR 32 / SR 32 Truck in Leesburg	US 19 / SR 3 / SR 3 Byp. in Leesburg	—	—	Completely concurrent with SR 3 Byp.
US 19 Bus.	6.5	10.5	US 19 / US 41 / US 41 Bus. / SR 3 / SR 7 / SR 155 south of Griffin	US 19 / US 41 / US 41 Bus. / SR 3 / SR 92 in Griffin	—	—	Completely concurrent with US 41 Bus.
US 19 Bus.	—	—	US 19 / US 41 / US 41 Bus. / SR 3 southeast of Hapeville	US 19 / US 41 / US 41 Bus. / SR 3 in Atlanta	1953	1965	Completely concurrent with US 41 Bus.
US 19 Bus.	4.7	7.6	US 19 / SR 9 / SR 52 / SR 60 / SR 60 Bus. in Dahlonega	US 19 / SR 9 / SR 60 / SR 60 Bus. north of Dahlonega	—	—	Completely concurrent with SR 60 Bus.
US 23 Bus.	9.622	15.485	US 1 / US 1 Bus. / US 23 / US 82 / SR 4 / SR 4 Bus. / SR 520 in Waycross	US 1 / US 1 Bus. / US 23 / SR 4 / SR 4 Bus. northwest of Waycross	1996	current	Completely concurrent with US 1 Bus./SR 4 Bus.
US 23 Bus.	—	—	US 23 / SR 19 / SR 19 Bus. in Hazlehurst	US 23 / US 221 / US 341 / SR 19 / SR 19 Bus. / SR 27 / SR 135 in Hazlehurst	1987	1995	Completely concurrent with SR 19 Bus.
US 23 Bus.	4.0	6.4	US 23 / SR 87 / SR 19 Bus. in Cochran	US 23 / US 129 Alt. / SR 87 / SR 87 Bus. / SR 112 north of Cochran	—	—	Completely concurrent with SR 87 Bus.
US 23 Bus.	—	—	US 23 / US 123 / US 441 / SR 13 / SR 15 in Baldwin	US 23 / US 123 / US 441 / SR 13 in Cornelia	1972	1992	Completely concurrent with SR 87 Bus.
US 25 Byp.	4.9	7.9	US 25 / US 301 / US 301 Byp. / SR 67 Byp. / SR 73 / SR 73 Byp. in Statesboro	US 25 / US 80 / SR 26 / SR 67 Byp. northwest of Statesboro	—	—	Completely concurrent with SR 67 Byp.
US 25 Byp.	5.7	9.2	US 25 / SR 121 / SR 121 Byp. south-southeast of Waynesboro	US 25 / SR 121 / SR 121 Byp. in Waynesboro	—	—	Completely concurrent with SR 121 Byp.
US 25 Bus.	—	—	Augusta	South Carolina state line on Augusta, Georgia–North Augusta, South Carolina city line	1961	1969	
US 25 Bus.	1.4	2.3	US 1 / US 25 / US 78 / US 278 / SR 10 / SR 28 / SR 121 in Augusta	US 25 Bus. / SR 4 at the South Carolina state line on the Augusta, Georgia–North Augusta, South Carolina city line	1961	current	
US 27 Bus.	3.473	5.589	US 27 / SR 1 / SR 1 Bus. east-southeast of Attapulgus	US 27 / SR 1 / SR 1 Bus. north-northwest of Attapulgus	1995	current	Completely concurrent with SR 1 Bus.
US 27 Bus.	3.064	4.931	US 27 / US 84 / SR 1 / SR 1 Bus. / SR 38 in Bainbridge	US 27 / US 84 / SR 1 / SR 1 Bus. / SR 38 in Bainbridge	1964	current	Completely concurrent with SR 1 Bus.
US 27 Bus.	4.315	6.944	US 27 / SR 1 / SR 1 Bus. in Blakely	US 27 / SR 1 / SR 1 Bus. in Blakely	1993	current	Completely concurrent with SR 1 Bus.
US 27 Bus.	4.315	6.944	US 27 / SR 1 / SR 1 Bus. south of Cuthbert	US 27 / SR 1 / SR 1 Bus. north of Cuthbert	1994	current	Completely concurrent with SR 1 Bus.
US 27 Alt.	98.060	157.812	US 27 / SR 1 / SR 85 in Columbus	US 27 / SR 1 / SR 16 / SR 166 in Carrollton	—	—	
US 27 Bus.	4.748	7.641	US 27 / SR 1 / SR 1 Bus. in Bremen	US 27 / SR 1 / SR 1 Bus. north of Bremen	1993	current	Completely concurrent with SR 1 Bus.
US 27 Bus.	2.397	3.858	US 27 / SR 1 / SR 1 Bus. south-southeast of Buchanan	US 27 / SR 1 / SR 1 Bus. north of Buchanan	1992	current	Completely concurrent with SR 1 Bus.
US 27 Bus.	4.222	6.795	US 27 / SR 1 / SR 1 Bus. / SR 100 in Cedartown	US 27 / SR 1 / SR 1 Bus. in Cedartown	1991	current	Completely concurrent with SR 1 Bus.
US 27 Bus.	3.344	5.382	US 27 / SR 1 / SR 1 Bus. in LaFayette	US 27 / SR 1 / SR 1 Bus. / SR 136 in LaFayette	1988	current	Completely concurrent with SR 1 Bus.
US 29 Bus.	—	—	US 27 / US 29 / SR 1 / SR 14 in LaGrange	US 29 / SR 14 in LaGrange	—	—	
US 29 Alt.	13.7	22.0	US 29 / SR 14 / SR 14 Alt. / SR 154 in Palmetto	US 29 / SR 14 / SR 14 Alt. / SR 14 Conn. in Red Oak	—	—	Completely concurrent with SR 14 Alt.
US 29 Bus.	—	—	US 29 / SR 8 in Decatur	US 29 / SR 8 in North Decatur	—	—	Completely concurrent with SR 8
US 29 Bus.	17.5	28.2	US 29 / SR 8 / SR 316 west of Dacula	US 29 / SR 8 / SR 53 / SR 316 southeast of Russell	1998	current	Completely concurrent with SR 8
US 29 Bus.	—	—	Lawrenceville	Athens	1950	1950	
Temp. US 29	—	—	US 29 / US 129 / SR 15 / SR 350 in Athens	US 29 / SR 8 / SR 350 in Athens	1965	—	
US 41 Bus.	7.0	11.3	US 41 / SR 7 / SR 7 Bus. / SR 31 south-southeast of Valdosta	US 41 / SR 7 / SR 7 Bus. in Valdosta	—	—	Completely concurrent with SR 7 Bus.
US 41 Bus.	7.9	12.7	US 41 / US 129 / SR 11 / SR 49 / SR 247 in Macon	US 41 / SR 19 / SR 247 in Macon	—	—	
US 41 Bus.	6.5	10.5	US 19 / US 19 Bus. / US 41 / SR 3 / SR 7 / SR 155 south of Griffin	US 19 / US 19 Bus. / US 41 / SR 3 / SR 92 in Griffin	—	—	Completely concurrent with US 19 Bus.
US 41 Bus.	—	—	US 19 / US 19 Bus. / US 41 / SR 3 southeast of Hapeville	US 19 / US 19 Bus. / US 41 / SR 3 in Atlanta	1953	1965	Completely concurrent with US 19 Bus.
US 41 Alt.	—	—	US 19 / US 29 / US 41 / US 78 / SR 3 / SR 3E / SR 8 in Atlanta	US 41 / SR 3 / SR 3E / SR 5 in Marietta	1948	1949	Completely concurrent with SR 3
US 41 Byp.	—	—	US 19 / US 29 / US 41 / US 78 / SR 3 / SR 3E / SR 8 in Atlanta	US 41 / SR 3 / SR 3E / SR 5 in Marietta	1949	1950	Completely concurrent with SR 3
US 41 Temp.	—	—	US 19 / US 29 / US 41 / US 78 / SR 3 / SR 3E / SR 8 in Atlanta	US 41 / SR 3 / SR 3E / SR 5 in Marietta	1948	1952	Completely concurrent with SR 3E
US 41 Temp.	—	—	Atlanta	Smyrna	1950	1954	
US 41 Temp.	—	—	Atlanta	Atlanta	1950	1954	
US 41 Temp.	—	—	Atlanta	Smyrna	1957	1964	
US 41 Bus.	—	—	Cartersville	Cartersville	1957	1966	
US 41 Truck	0.50	0.80	US 41 / US 76 / US 76 Truck / SR 2 / SR 3 / SR 151 in Ringgold	US 41 / US 76 / US 76 Truck / SR 2 / SR 3 / SR 151 Spur in Ringgold	—	—	Completely concurrent with US 76 Truck
US 76 Bus.	—	—	Dalton	Dalton	1991	2000	
US 76 Truck	0.50	0.80	US 41 / US 41 Truck / US 76 / SR 2 / SR 3 / SR 151 in Ringgold	US 41 / US 41 Truck / US 76 / SR 2 / SR 3 / SR 151 Spur in Ringgold	—	—	Completely concurrent with US 41 Truck
US 78 Alt.	—	—	US 78 Alt. / SR 8 Alt. / SR 46 at the Alabama state line west of Bowdon	US 78 / SR 8 / SR 8 Alt. in Villa Rica	1934	1952	Completely concurrent with SR 8 Alt.
US 78 Bus.	10.3	16.6	US 29 / SR 8 / SR 316 southeast of Bogart	US 29 / US 78 / US 129 / US 441 / SR 8 / SR 10 / SR 10 Loop / SR 15 in Athens	—	—	Completely concurrent with SR 10
US 78 Bus.	4.6	7.4	US 78 / SR 10 / SR 10 Bus. northwest of Washington	US 78 / US 378 / SR 10 / SR 10 Bus. / SR 17 / SR 17 Bus. in Washington	1980	current	Completely concurrent with SR 10 Bus.
US 80 Temp.	—	—	Columbus	Crystal Valley	—	—	
US 82 Bus.	11.9	19.2	US 19 / US 19 Bus. / US 82 / SR 3 / SR 520 / SR 520 Bus. in Albany	US 82 / SR 520 / SR 520 Bus. east of Albany	1980	current	Completely concurrent with SR 520 Bus.
US 84 Bus.	2.8	4.5	US 27 / US 84 / SR 1 / SR 38 / SR 38 Bus. / SR 97 Conn. in Bainbridge	US 84 / SR 38 / SR 38 Bus. in Bainbridge	—	—	Completely concurrent with SR 38 Bus.
US 84 Bus.	4.9	7.9	US 84 / US 319 / SR 3 Alt. / SR 35 / SR 38 / SR 38 Bus. north-northwest of Thomasville	US 19 / US 84 / SR 3 / SR 38 / SR 38 Bus. / SR 300 east of Thomasville	—	—	Completely concurrent with SR 38 Bus.
US 129 Bus.	1.3	2.1	US 129 / US 129 Alt. / US 341 / SR 27 / SR 112 / SR 230 / SR 257 in Hawkinsville	US 129 / US 341 / US 341 Bus. / SR 11 / SR 11 Bus. in Hawkinsville	—	—	
US 129 Alt.	48.9	78.7	US 341 / SR 26 / SR 27 / SR 112 / SR 230 / SR 257 in Hawkinsville	US 129 / SR 11 / SR 22 / SR 49 in Macon	—	—	
US 129 Bus.	3.8	6.1	US 129 / US 441 / US 441 Bus. / SR 24 / SR 44 in Eatonton	US 129 / US 441 / US 441 Bus. / SR 24 in Eatonton	1992	current	Completely concurrent with US 441 Bus./SR 24 Bus.
US 129 Byp.	4.2	6.8	US 129 / US 278 Truck / US 441 / US 441 Byp. / US 441 Truck / SR 12 Truck / SR 24 / SR 24 Byp. / SR 24 Truck in Madison	US 129 / US 278 / US 278 Truck / US 441 / US 441 Byp. / US 441 Truck / SR 12 / SR 12 Truck / SR 24 / SR 24 Byp. / SR 24 Truck northeast of Madison	1992	current	Completely concurrent with US 278 Truck/US 441 Byp./US 441 Truck/SR 12 Truck/SR 24 Byp./SR 24 Truck
US 129 Bus.	3.0	4.8	US 129 / US 441 / US 441 Bus. / SR 24 / SR 24 Bus. southwest of Watkinsville	US 129 / US 441 / US 441 Bus. / SR 15 / SR 24 / SR 24 Bus. north-northwest of Watkinsville	1997	current	Completely concurrent with US 441 Bus./SR 24 Bus.
US 129 Bus.	7.1	11.4	US 129 / SR 11 Conn. / SR 15 Alt. in Arcade	US 129 / SR 11 / SR 11 Bus. north of Jefferson	2000	current	
US 129 Alt.	—	—	Jefferson	Jefferson	—	—	
US 129 Bus.	3.3	5.3	I-985 / US 23 / US 129 / SR 11 in Gainesville	US 129 / SR 11 / SR 369 east of Gainesville	—	—	
US 129 Byp.	—	—	I-985 / US 23 / US 129 / SR 11 in Gainesville	US 129 / SR 11 / SR 369 east of Gainesville	—	—	
US 129 Byp.	3.0	4.8	US 129 / SR 11 south of Cleveland	US 129 / SR 11 / SR 75 Conn. northwest of Cleveland	2016	current	Completely concurrent with SR 11 Byp.
US 129 Truck	2.2	3.5	US 19 / US 129 / SR 11 / SR 11 Truck south-southeast of Blairsville	US 19 / US 76 / US 129 / SR 2 / SR 11 / SR 11 Truck / SR 515 in Blairsville	—	2016	Completely concurrent with SR 11 Truck
US 221 Truck	2.0	3.2	US 221 / SR 135 / SR 135 Conn. / SR 135 Truck in Hazlehurst	US 23 / US 221 / US 341 / SR 19 / SR 27 / SR 135 / SR 135 Truck in Hazlehurst	—	—	Completely concurrent with SR 135 Truck
US 278 Bus.	3.2	5.1	US 278 / SR 6 / SR 6 Bus. west of Rockmart	US 278 / SR 6 / SR 6 Bus. / SR 101 in Rockmart	1994	current	Completely concurrent with SR 6 Bus.
US 278 Truck	5.6	9.0	US 278 / SR 12 / SR 12 Truck / SR 24 Spur / SR 83 in Madison	US 129 / US 129 Byp. / US 278 / US 441 / US 441 Byp. / US 441 Truck / SR 12 / SR 12 Truck / SR 24 / SR 24 Byp. / SR 24 Truck northeast of Madison	—	—	Completely concurrent with SR 12 Truck
US 278 Byp.	1.6	2.6	US 278 / SR 12 / SR 12 Byp. in Warrenton	US 278 / SR 12 / SR 12 Byp. / SR 80 / SR 80 Alt. in Warrenton	1989	current	Completely concurrent with SR 12 Byp.; both highways are also signed as truck routes.
US 301 Byp.	6.9	11.1	US 25 / US 301 / US 25 Byp. / SR 67 Byp. / SR 73 / SR 73 Byp. in Statesboro	US 301 / SR 73 / SR 73 Byp. in Statesboro	1993	current	Completely concurrent with SR 73 Byp.
US 301 Bus.	—	—	US 301 / SR 21 / SR 73 / SR 73 Loop southwest of Sylvania	US 301 / SR 73 / SR 73 Loop in Sylvania	1970	2017	Completely concurrent with SR 73
US 319 Bus.	—	—	Thomasville	Thomasville	1994	2006	
US 319 Bus.	6.8	10.9	US 319 / SR 33 / SR 35 in Moultrie	US 319 / SR 33 / SR 35 / SR 133 in Moultrie	—	—	Completely concurrent with SR 33
US 341 Bus.	4.1	6.6	US 23 / US 341 / SR 27 / SR 27 Bus. in Eastman	US 341 / SR 27 / SR 27 Bus. / SR 46 west of Eastman	—	—	Completely concurrent with SR 27 Bus.
US 341 Bus.	1.3	2.1	US 129 Alt. / US 341 / SR 26 / SR 27 / SR 112 / SR 230 / SR 257 in Hawkinsville	US 129 / US 129 Bus. / US 341 / SR 11 / SR 11 Bus. in Hawkinsville	—	—	
US 341 Byp.	6.2	10.0	US 341 / SR 11 / SR 11 Bus. in Perry	US 341 / SR 7 / SR 11 Conn. in Perry	—	—	
US 378 Bus.	—	—	Washington	Washington	—	—	
US 441 Byp.	8.3	13.4	US 319 / US 441 / SR 31 / SR 117 south-southwest of Dublin	US 441 / SR 29 / SR 117 north-northwest of Dublin	—	—	Completely concurrent with SR 117
US 441 Bus.	7.1	11.4	US 441 / SR 29 / SR 243 in Scottsboro	US 441 / SR 24 / SR 29 in Milledgeville	—	—	
US 441 Bus.	3.8	6.1	US 129 / US 129 Bus. / US 441 / SR 24 / SR 44 in Eatonton	US 129 / US 129 Bus. / US 441 / SR 24 in Eatonton	1992	current	Completely concurrent with US 129 Bus./SR 24 Bus.
US 441 Byp.	4.2	6.8	US 129 / US 129 Byp. / US 278 Truck / US 441 / US 441 Truck / SR 12 Truck / SR 24 / SR 24 Byp. / SR 24 Truck in Madison	US 129 / US 129 Byp. / US 278 / US 278 Truck / US 441 / US 441 Truck / SR 12 / SR 12 Truck / SR 24 / SR 24 Byp. / SR 24 Truck northeast of Madison	1992	current	Completely concurrent with US 129 Byp./US 278 Truck/US 441 Truck/SR 12 Truck/SR 24 Truck
US 441 Truck	4.2	6.8	US 129 / US 129 Byp. / US 278 Truck / US 441 / US 441 Byp. / SR 12 Truck / SR 24 / SR 24 Byp. / SR 24 Truck in Madison	US 129 / US 129 Byp. / US 278 / US 278 Truck / US 441 / US 441 Byp. / SR 12 / SR 12 Truck / SR 24 / SR 24 Byp. / SR 24 Truck northeast of Madison	—	—	Completely concurrent with US 129 Byp./US 278 Truck/US 441 Byp./SR 12 Truck/SR 24 Truck
US 441 Bus.	3.0	4.8	US 129 / US 129 Bus. / US 441 / SR 24 / SR 24 Bus. southwest of Watkinsville	US 129 / US 129 Bus. / US 441 / SR 15 / SR 24 / SR 24 Bus. north-northwest of Watkinsville	1997	current	Completely concurrent with US 129 Bus./SR 24 Bus.
US 441 Temp.	—	—	US 29 / US 129 / SR 15 / SR 350 in Athens	US 441 / SR 15 Alt. / SR 350 in Athens	1965	1985	
US 441 Bus.	4.1	6.6	US 441 / SR 15 / SR 334 in Commerce	US 441 / SR 15 / SR 15 Alt. / SR 59 in Commerce	—	—	
US 441 Bus.	15.3	24.6	US 441 / SR 15 / SR 105 in Baldwin	US 23 / US 441 / SR 15 / SR 385 in Hollywood	—	—	Also marked as "Historic US Route 441
