= Worth County, Georgia =

County in Georgia, United States

- County
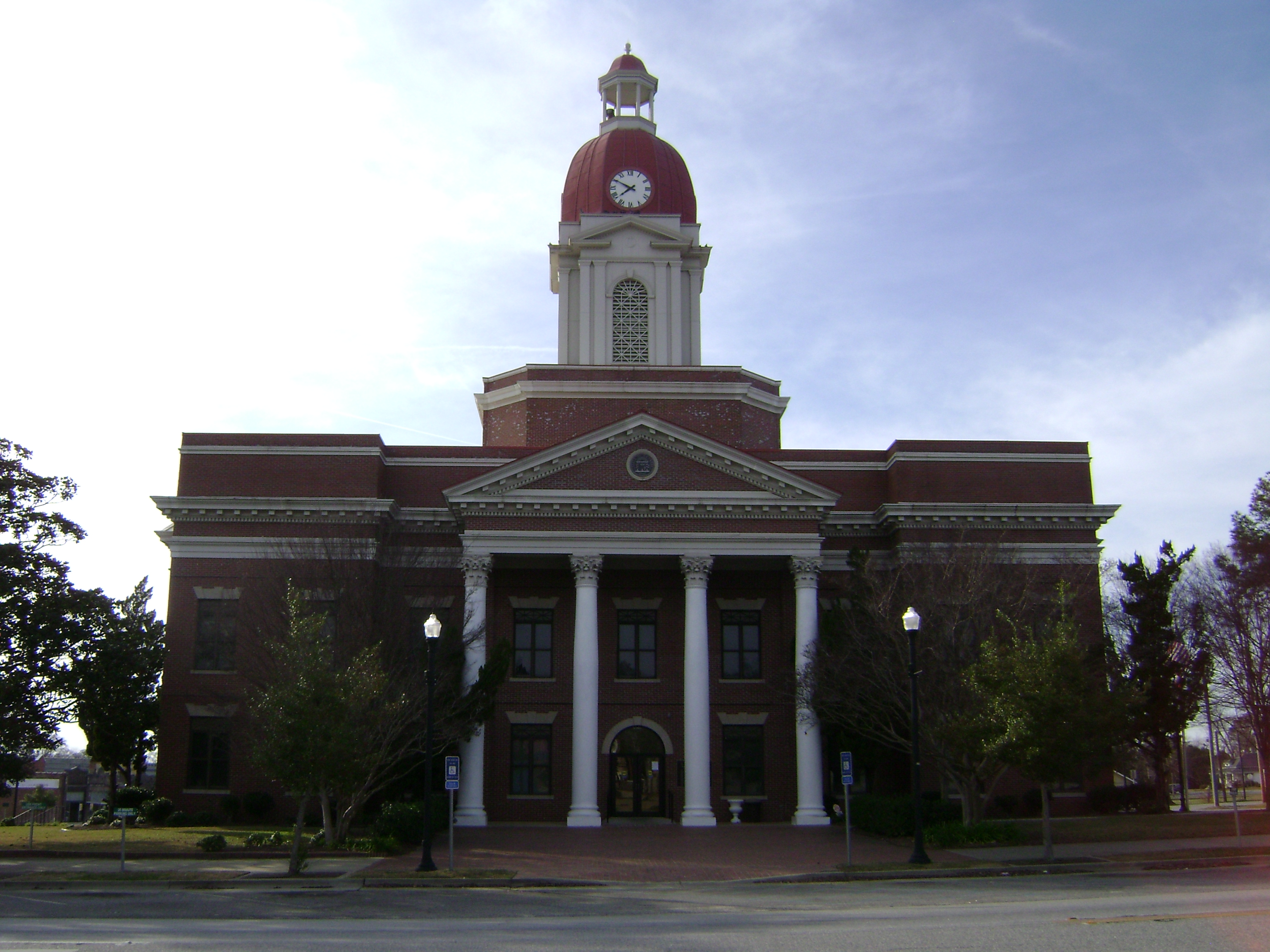
- Worth County courthouse in Sylvester

- Location within the U.S. state of Georgia
- Coordinates: 31°33′N 83°51′W
- Country: United States
- State: Georgia
- Founded: December 20, 1853; 172 years ago
- Named for: William J. Worth
- Seat: Sylvester
- Largest city: Sylvester

Area
  - Total: 575 sq mi (1,490 km^{2})
  - Land: 571 sq mi (1,480 km^{2})
  - Water: 4.1 sq mi (11 km^{2}) 0.7%

Population (2020)
  - Total: 20,784
  - Estimate (2025): 20,059 ▼
  - Density: 36.4/sq mi (14.1/km^{2})
- Time zone: UTC−5 (Eastern)
  - Summer (DST): UTC−4 (EDT)
- Congressional district: 8th
- Website: www.worthcountyboc.com

Worth County is a county located in the south-central portion of the U.S. state of Georgia. As of the 2020 census, the population was 20,784. The county seat is Sylvester. Worth County is included in the Albany, Georgia metropolitan area.

== History ==
Worth County was created from Dooly and Irwin counties on December 20, 1853, by an act of the Georgia General Assembly, becoming Georgia's 106th county. It was named for Major General William J. Worth of New York. In 1905, portions of Worth County were used to create Tift and Turner counties.

== Geography ==
According to the U.S. Census Bureau, the county has a total area of 575 square miles (1,490 km^{2}), of which 571 square miles (1,480 km^{2}) is land and 4.1 square miles (11 km^{2}) (0.7%) is water.

The eastern third of Worth County, from west of State Route 33 heading east, is located in the Little River sub-basin of the Suwannee River basin. The northern third of the county is located in the Middle Flint River sub-basin of the ACF River Basin (Apalachicola-Chattahoochee-Flint River Basin). A narrow portion of the western edge of Worth County is located in the Lower Flint River sub-basin of the same ACF River basin. Finally, a portion of the southwest of the county, north of Doerun, is located in the Upper Ochlockonee River sub-basin of the larger Ochlockonee River basin.

=== Major highways ===
- U.S. Route 82 / State Route 520
- State Route 32
- State Route 33
- State Route 112
- State Route 133
- State Route 256
- State Route 300
- State Route 313

=== Adjacent counties ===
- Crisp County - north
- Tift County - east
- Turner County - northeast
- Colquitt County - south
- Mitchell County - southwest
- Lee County - northwest
- Dougherty County - west

== Communities ==
=== Cities ===
- Poulan
- Sylvester
- Warwick

=== Town ===
- Sumner

=== Unincorporated communities ===
- Acree
- Bridgeboro
- Oakfield

== Demographics ==
Historical population
Census	Pop.	Note	%±
1860	2,763		—
1870	3,778		36.7%
1880	5,892		56.0%
1890	10,048		70.5%
1900	18,664		85.7%
1910	19,147		2.6%
1920	23,863		24.6%
1930	21,094		−11.6%
1940	21,374		1.3%
1950	19,357		−9.4%
1960	16,682		−13.8%
1970	14,770		−11.5%
1980	18,064		22.3%
1990	19,745		9.3%
2000	21,967		11.3%
2010	21,679		−1.3%
2020	20,784		−4.1%
2025 (est.)	20,059	▼	−3.5%
U.S. Decennial Census; 1790-1880 1890-1910; 1920-1930 1930-1940; 1940-1950 1960-1980; 1980-2000 2010

=== Racial and ethnic composition ===
Worth County, Georgia – Racial and ethnic composition Note: the US Census treats Hispanic/Latino as an ethnic category. This table excludes Latinos from the racial categories and assigns them to a separate category. Hispanics/Latinos may be of any race.
Race / Ethnicity (NH = Non-Hispanic)	Pop 1980	Pop 1990	Pop 2000	Pop 2010	Pop 2020	% 1980	% 1990	% 2000	% 2010	% 2020
White alone (NH)	11,763	13,404	14,999	15,044	14,427	65.12%	67.89%	68.28%	69.39%	69.41%
Black or African American alone (NH)	6,086	6,029	6,482	5,951	5,255	33.69%	30.53%	29.51%	27.45%	25.28%
Native American or Alaska Native alone (NH)	16	53	77	48	49	0.09%	0.27%	0.35%	0.22%	0.24%
Asian alone (NH)	26	37	47	74	87	0.14%	0.19%	0.21%	0.34%	0.42%
Native Hawaiian or Pacific Islander alone (NH)	x	x	2	4	8	x	x	0.01%	0.02%	0.04%
Other race alone (NH)	4	0	8	12	53	0.02%	0.00%	0.04%	0.06%	0.26%
Mixed race or Multiracial (NH)	x	x	112	211	524	x	x	0.51%	0.97%	2.52%
Hispanic or Latino (any race)	169	222	240	335	381	0.94%	1.12%	1.09%	1.55%	1.83%
Total	18,064	19,745	21,967	21,679	20,784	100.00%	100.00%	100.00%	100.00%	100.00%

=== 2020 census ===
As of the 2020 census, the county had a population of 20,784, and the census counted 5,896 families residing in the county. The median age was 42.3 years. 20.9% of residents were under the age of 18 and 19.4% of residents were 65 years of age or older. For every 100 females there were 92.4 males, and for every 100 females age 18 and over there were 91.0 males age 18 and over. 29.6% of residents lived in urban areas, while 70.4% lived in rural areas.

The racial makeup of the county was 69.9% White, 25.4% Black or African American, 0.3% American Indian and Alaska Native, 0.4% Asian, 0.0% Native Hawaiian and Pacific Islander, 0.8% from some other race, and 3.1% from two or more races. Hispanic or Latino residents of any race comprised 1.8% of the population.

There were 8,183 households in the county, of which 29.4% had children under the age of 18 living with them and 30.4% had a female householder with no spouse or partner present. About 26.1% of all households were made up of individuals and 12.6% had someone living alone who was 65 years of age or older.

There were 9,244 housing units, of which 11.5% were vacant. Among occupied housing units, 71.3% were owner-occupied and 28.7% were renter-occupied. The homeowner vacancy rate was 1.0% and the rental vacancy rate was 9.1%.

== Politics ==
United States presidential election results for Worth County, Georgia
Year	Republican		Democratic		Third party(ies)	
Year	No.	%	No.	%	No.	%
1912	77	13.07%	500	84.89%	12	2.04%
1916	68	8.62%	690	87.45%	31	3.93%
1920	214	25.48%	626	74.52%	0	0.00%
1924	40	5.47%	616	84.27%	75	10.26%
1928	310	24.56%	952	75.44%	0	0.00%
1932	38	1.65%	2,269	98.23%	3	0.13%
1936	132	10.50%	1,124	89.42%	1	0.08%
1940	190	16.83%	936	82.91%	3	0.27%
1944	218	16.59%	1,096	83.41%	0	0.00%
1948	124	8.24%	1,159	77.06%	221	14.69%
1952	444	18.27%	1,986	81.73%	0	0.00%
1956	293	12.36%	2,078	87.64%	0	0.00%
1960	338	13.81%	2,110	86.19%	0	0.00%
1964	3,157	78.55%	862	21.45%	0	0.00%
1968	603	13.79%	720	16.47%	3,049	69.74%
1972	2,942	84.44%	542	15.56%	0	0.00%
1976	1,156	29.30%	2,790	70.70%	0	0.00%
1980	2,076	44.22%	2,567	54.68%	52	1.11%
1984	2,910	63.33%	1,685	36.67%	0	0.00%
1988	2,668	66.55%	1,311	32.70%	30	0.75%
1992	2,344	40.16%	2,578	44.17%	915	15.68%
1996	2,752	48.07%	2,300	40.17%	673	11.76%
2000	3,792	62.56%	2,214	36.53%	55	0.91%
2004	5,105	69.40%	2,219	30.17%	32	0.44%
2008	5,780	68.96%	2,542	30.33%	60	0.72%
2012	5,869	69.57%	2,487	29.48%	80	0.95%
2016	6,152	73.95%	2,020	24.28%	147	1.77%
2020	6,830	73.56%	2,395	25.79%	60	0.65%
2024	6,991	75.10%	2,300	24.71%	18	0.19%

United States Senate election results for Worth County, Georgia2
Year	Republican		Democratic		Third party(ies)	
Year	No.	%	No.	%	No.	%
2020	6,726	73.03%	2,327	25.27%	157	1.70%
2020	2,608	56.39%	2,017	43.61%	0	0.00%

United States Senate election results for Worth County, Georgia3
Year	Republican		Democratic		Third party(ies)	
Year	No.	%	No.	%	No.	%
2020	3,541	38.80%	1,589	17.41%	3,996	43.79%
2020	6,830	74.04%	2,395	25.96%	0	0.00%
2022	5,416	73.61%	1,842	25.03%	100	1.36%
2022	5,097	74.34%	1,759	25.66%	0	0.00%

Georgia Gubernatorial election results for Worth County
Year	Republican		Democratic		Third party(ies)	
Year	No.	%	No.	%	No.	%
2022	5,649	76.39%	1,716	23.20%	30	0.41%

The county seat, Sylvester, serves as the political and administrative hub, where local governance focuses on addressing the needs of its approximately 21,000 residents. The county government is structured around a Board of Commissioners, which is responsible for the administration of various functions including infrastructure, public safety, and economic initiatives. The Board meets regularly to discuss issues affecting the community, providing a platform for residents to engage with their elected officials, voice concerns, and advocate for community-driven solutions. This commitment to community involvement fosters transparency and builds trust between constituents and local government.

Agriculture remains the cornerstone of Worth County’s economy, with cotton, peanuts, and poultry playing vital roles. As a result, local politics often focus on agricultural support, with initiatives aimed at promoting sustainable farming practices and providing resources for local farmers. The county works in conjunction with agricultural extension services and organizations to educate farmers about modern techniques, crop diversification, and the importance of maintaining viable agricultural practices for the future.

Education is a significant political concern in Worth County, governed by the Worth County School District. Local school board meetings see active participation from parents and community members, all advocating for improvements in educational funding, resources, and facilities. Recent efforts have targeted enhancing technology in the classroom and providing vocational training programs that align with local industry needs, thereby preparing students for the workforce and furthering their educational pursuits. There is a strong push for collaboration among educational institutions, local businesses, and government to ensure a sustainable and skilled workforce.

Public safety is another primary focus for local governance in Worth County. The Worth County Sheriff's Office works to maintain community safety through various initiatives such as neighborhood policing and community engagement programs. Public safety discussions often include improving resources for law enforcement and emergency services to adequately serve a rural population. The county emphasizes a community-oriented approach, encouraging residents to participate in public safety meetings and collaborate with law enforcement agencies.

Infrastructure development poses continuous challenges, especially concerning rural road maintenance and access to healthcare services. Worth County leaders strive to secure funding for essential infrastructure projects, including road repairs and improvements to water and sewer systems, to promote economic growth and enhance the quality of life for residents. Partnerships with state and federal agencies, coupled with grant opportunities, are pursued to address these infrastructural needs effectively.

Civic engagement in Worth County has seen an increase as residents express growing interest in local governance and political participation. Voter registration drives and educational workshops aim to inform citizens about the electoral process, ensuring that community voices are heard in local elections. Town hall meetings provide an opportunity for constituents to engage directly with their elected representatives, fostering a sense of accountability and community connection.

Despite its historical roots, Worth County faces contemporary challenges such as limited healthcare access and outmigration of younger residents seeking opportunities in urban centers. Local leaders are committed to addressing these issues through strategic planning and community collaboration, exploring partnerships with healthcare providers to broaden access to medical services and enhance community well-being.

=== Representation ===
As of the 2020s, Worth County is a Republican stronghold, voting 75% for Donald Trump in 2024. For elections to the United States House of Representatives, Worth County is part of Georgia's 8th congressional district, currently represented by Austin Scott. For elections to the Georgia State Senate, Worth County is part of District 15. For elections to the Georgia House of Representatives, Worth County is part of District 152.

== See also ==
- National Register of Historic Places listings in Worth County, Georgia
- List of counties in Georgia
