= Lake Chehaw =

- Lake Worth
- Flint River Dam

- Location within Georgia Location within the United States
- Location: Dougherty County, Georgia
- Coordinates: 31°36′07″N 84°08′13″W
- Type: reservoir
- Primary inflows: Flint River, Kinchafoonee Creek, Muckalee Creek
- Primary outflows: Flint River
- Basin countries: United States
- Surface area: 1,400 acres (6 km^{2})
- Max. depth: 20 ft (6.1 m)
- Shore length^{1}: 36 mi (58 km)
- Surface elevation: 220 feet (67 m)
- Settlements: Albany, Georgia
- ^{1} Shore length is not a well-defined measure.

Lake Chehaw is a small reservoir at the confluence of the Flint River, Kinchafoonee Creek, and Muckalee Creek.

The concrete Flint River Dam was built in 1908 for hydroelectric generation and is owned by Georgia Power today. Lake Chehaw is very riverine and shallow with average depths of 17 feet. In winter, the lake is drawn down nearly 10 feet in anticipation of flooding spring rains.

In the Flood of 1994, the lake overflowed its banks and the dam itself was underwater at one point.
