= Bridgeboro, Georgia =

Unincorporated community in Georgia, U.S.

Coordinates: 31°24′06″N 83°58′30″W

Bridgeboro is an unincorporated community in Worth County, in the U.S. state of Georgia.

== History ==
A post office called Bridgeboro was established in 1905, and remained in operation until 1957. The name "Bridgeboro" was applied to this community in reference to the Limestone deposit underneath this part of Georgia. There was once a Limestone quarry in the area but has since been abandoned. The Georgia General Assembly incorporated the "Town of Bridgeboro" in 1912. The town's charter was dissolved in 1995.
