= Herod, Georgia =

Unincorporated community in Georgia, U.S.

Coordinates: 31°41′56″N 84°26′29″W

Herod is an unincorporated community in Terrell County, in the U.S. state of Georgia.

== History ==
The community was named after Old Herod, a Creek Indian chief. Variant names are "Herod Town" and "Herodtown". A post office named Herrodtown was established in 1848 and closed in 1852, then a post office called Herod was in operation from 1892 until 1907.

The Georgia General Assembly incorporated the place as the Town of Herod in 1901, and its municipal charter was repealed in 1912.
