= Doerun, Georgia =

City in Georgia, United States

- City
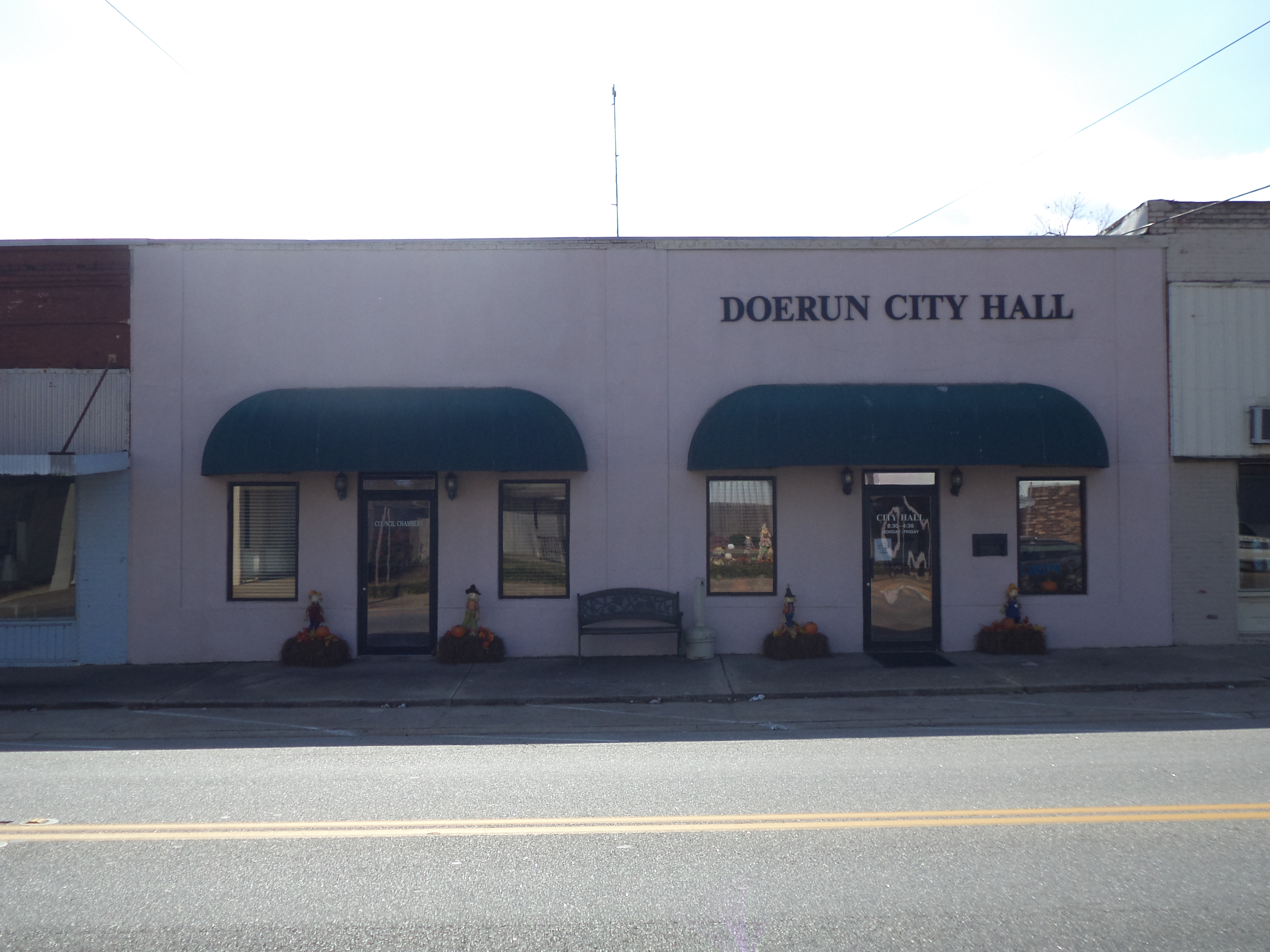
- The old Doerun City Hall in 2013

- Seal

- Location in Colquitt County and the state of Georgia
- Coordinates: 31°19′12″N 83°55′0″W
- Country: United States
- State: Georgia
- County: Colquitt

Government
  - Mayor: Michael Campbell

Area
  - Total: 1.30 sq mi (3.37 km^{2})
  - Land: 1.29 sq mi (3.33 km^{2})
  - Water: 0.015 sq mi (0.04 km^{2})
- Elevation: 397 ft (121 m)

Population (2020)
  - Total: 738
  - Density: 574.6/sq mi (221.85/km^{2})
- Time zone: UTC-5 (Eastern (EST))
  - Summer (DST): UTC-4 (EDT)
- ZIP code: 31744
- Area code: 229
- FIPS code: 13-23284
- GNIS feature ID: 0313522
- Website: cityofdoerun.com

Doerun is a city in Colquitt County, Georgia, United States. The population was 738 in 2020.

== History ==
A post office called Doerun has been in operation since 1895. The Georgia General Assembly incorporated the place in 1899 as the "Town of Doerun". The community was named for a deer run near the original town site.

== Geography ==
Doerun is located at 31°19′12″N 83°55′0″W (31.320046, -83.916675). According to the United States Census Bureau, the city has a total area of 1.3 square miles (3.4 km^{2}), of which 1.3 square miles (3.4 km^{2}) is land and 0.79% is water.

== Demographics ==
Historical population
Census	Pop.	Note	%±
1900	325		—
1910	630		93.8%
1920	919		45.9%
1930	719		−21.8%
1940	832		15.7%
1950	902		8.4%
1960	1,037		15.0%
1970	1,157		11.6%
1980	1,062		−8.2%
1990	899		−15.3%
2000	828		−7.9%
2010	774		−6.5%
2020	738		−4.7%
U.S. Decennial Census; 1850-1870 1870-1880; 1890-1910 1920-1930; 1940 1950 1960; 1970 1980 1990; 2000 2010

As of the census of 2000, there were 828 people, 343 households, and 221 families residing in the city. By 2020, its population was 738.

== Education ==
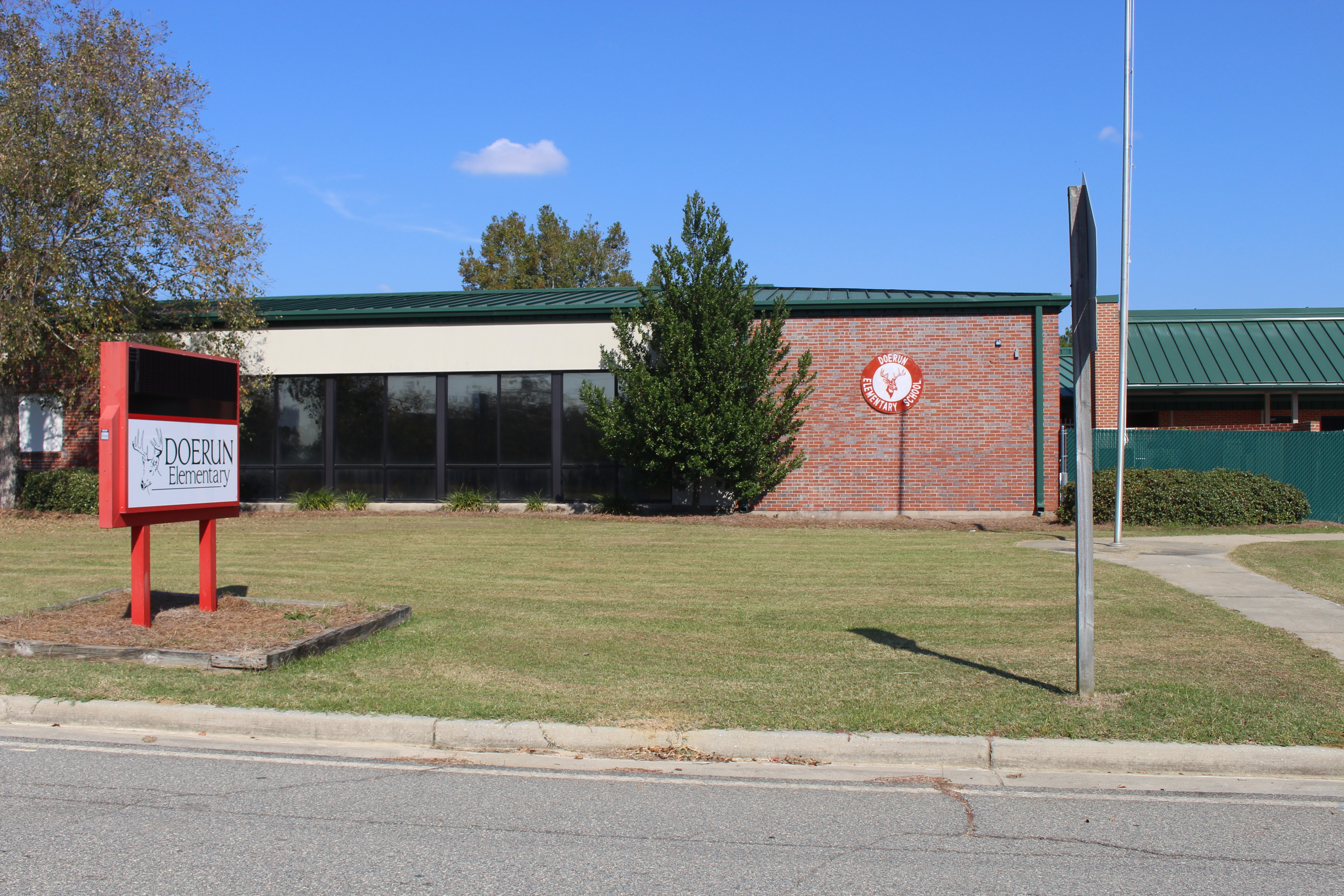
Doerun Elementary School

Doerun Elementary School (DES) is located within the city limits of Doerun. DES is administered by the Colquitt County School District.

Doerun is also served by Colquitt County High School. The principal is Kati Stephan, a former teacher of Doerun Elementary.
