= Georgia State Route 309 =

Highway in Georgia, United States

State Route 309
- SR 309 highlighted in red

Route information
- Maintained by GDOT
- Length: 26.8 mi (43.1 km)

Major junctions
- South end: CR 159 at the Florida state line southwest of Attapulgus
- SR 241 southwest of Attapulgus; US 27 / US 84 / SR 1 / SR 38 in Bainbridge; SR 97 in Bainbridge; US 84 Bus. / SR 38 Bus. in Bainbridge; US 27 Bus. / US 84 Bus. / SR 1 Bus. / SR 38 Bus. in Bainbridge; US 27 Bus. / SR 1 Bus. in Bainbridge; SR 311 in Bainbridge; SR 97 northeast of Bainbridge
- North end: SR 262 north of Climax

Location
- Country: United States
- State: Georgia
- Counties: Decatur

Highway system
- Georgia State Highway System; Interstate; US; State; Special
| ← SR 308 | → SR 310 |

State Route 309 (SR 309) is a north-south state highway located in the southwestern part of the U.S. state of Georgia. It exists entirely within Decatur County.

== Route description ==
=== Southeast of Bainbridge ===
SR 309 begins at the Florida state line, southwest of Attapulgus. Here, the roadway continues as County Road 159 toward Havana, Florida.

SR 309 heads northwest to an intersection with SR 241 just northwest of its southern terminus. The highway continues northwest, passing through rural parts of the county, and passing through the unincorporated community of Fowlstown, before it enters Bainbridge.

=== Bainbridge ===
The highway enters Bainbridge on South West Street. It heads north to a partial interchange with US 27/US 84/SR 1/SR 38 (Wiregrass Georgia Parkway). Just north of the interchange, SR 309 meets SR 97. The two routes form a concurrency through the city. The concurrent routes continue north until they intersect US 84 Business/SR 38 Business (West Shotwell Street), where they turn right onto US 84 Business/SR 1 Business for one block. At this point, the four highways meet US 27 Business/SR 1 Business (North Broad Street). Here, SR 97/SR 309 turn left onto US 27 Business/SR 1 Business north, and US 27 Business/SR 1 Business south run concurrent along with US 84 Business/SR 38 Business (all along East Shotwell Street). About seven blocks farther north, North Broad Street meets Dothan Road and East Calhoun Street. Here, US 27 Business/SR 1 Business north depart the concurrency along Dothan Road and SR 97/SR 309 head along East Calhoun Street, while North Broad Street continues north for another block. The concurrency head northeast to an intersection with SR 311 (East River Road), just before leaving the city.

=== Northeast of Bainbridge ===
After leaving Bainbridge, SR 97/SR 309 continue to head northeast along Vada Road, until they split, where the "Vada Road" name continues along SR 97. SR 309 adopts the name "Old Pelham Road". The highway continues to the northeast until it meets its northern terminus at SR 262 (Pelham Road), north of Climax, where the roadway continues as Mars Hill Church Road.

== Major intersections ==
The entire route is in Decatur County.

| Location | mi | km | Destinations | Notes |
|---|---|---|---|---|
| | | | CR 159 south (Salem Road) – Havana | Florida state line |
| Taylor Crossing | 0.5 | 0.80 | SR 241 (Quincy Highway) – Quincy, FL, Attapulgus | |
| Bainbridge | 14.6 | 23.5 | US 27 south / US 84 east (SR 1 south / SR 38 east) – Attapulgus, Tallahassee, Cairo | interchange |
| Bainbridge | 14.7 | 23.7 | SR 97 south (Louise Street) – Faceville, Chattahoochee, Quincy, FL | Southern end of SR 97 concurrency; SR 97 south provides access to US 27 north / US 84 west / SR 1 north / SR 38 west |
see SR 97 (mile 21.5-26.4)
| | 19.6 | 31.5 | SR 97 north (Vada Road) – Vada, Camilla | Northern end of SR 97 concurrency |
| Parker Courthouse | 26.8 | 43.1 | SR 262 (Pelham Road) | Northern terminus; roadway continues as Mars Hill Church Road. |
1.000 mi = 1.609 km; 1.000 km = 0.621 mi: Concurrency terminus; Incomplete access
