= Special routes of U.S. Route 27 =

Special routes of U.S. Route 27

Highway system
- United States Numbered Highway System; List; Special; Divided

There are at least 16 current and 19 former special routes of U.S. Route 27 (US 27), along with 10 current and six former special routes of State Route 1 (SR 1) in Georgia.

== Florida ==
=== Sebring–Avon Park alternate route ===
U.S. Highway 27 Alternate
- Location: Sebring–Avon Park, Florida
- Existed: 1949–1979

U.S. Highway 27 Alternate (US 27 Alt.) existed from Sebring to Avon Park, Florida. It was deleted in 1979 and is now part of State Road 17 (SR 17).

=== Sebring–Leesburg temporary route ===
U.S. Highway 27 Temporary
- Location: Sebring–Leesburg, Florida

=== Haines City–Sunray Deli Estates alternate route ===
U.S. Highway 27 Alternate
- Location: Haines City–Sunray Deli Estates, Florida
- Existed: 1949–1998

U.S. Highway 27 Alternate (US 27 Alt.) existed in Polk County from Haines City to Sunray Deli Estates, Florida. This bannered route was deleted in 1998, although some road maps and atlases still continued to show it until 2011. The road is now known as SR 17.

=== Lady Lake–Belleview alternate route ===
U.S. Highway 27 Alternate
- Location: Lady Lake–Belleview, Florida
- Existed: c. 1960–1980

U.S. Highway 27 Alternate (US 27 Alt.) was an alternate route of US 27 that existed around Lake Weir, from Belleview to Lady Lake, existing until 1980. This was also concurrent with US 441 Alt. and today is a bi-county maintained segment of County Road 25 (CR 25). US 27 Alt. was the main route of US 441/US 27 prior to 1960.

=== Williston–Perry alternate route ===
U.S. Highway 27 Alternate
- Location: Williston–Perry, Florida
- Length: 93.281 mi (150.121 km)

U.S. Highway 27 Alternate (US 27 Alt.) is a 93.281-mile-long (150.121 km) alternate route of US 27 that exists in the north-central part of the U.S. state of Florida. It is signed north–south but is a primarily east–west route, traveling between Williston and Perry. US 27 Alt. is concurrent with US 19/US 98 from Chiefland to Perry and also has the hidden Florida Department of Transportation designation of SR 55, accounting for nearly two thirds of its route. Between Williston and Chiefland, it has the hidden SR 500 designation.

US 27 Alt. is one of the primary routes between Northwest and Central Florida, having been recently upgraded to four lanes along its entire length. With a signed speed limit of 65 mph (105 km/h), this gives it more capacity than the mostly two-lane mainline route.

Major intersections

County	Location	mi	km	Destinations	Notes
Levy	Williston	0.000	0.000	US 27 / US 41 north / SR 121 north (North Main Street / East Noble Avenue / SR 500 south / SR 45 north) – Archer, Gainesville, Ocala	Southern terminus; south end of US 41/SR 45/SR 121 concurrency
Levy	Williston	0.525	0.845	US 41 south / SR 121 south (Southwest 7th Street / SR 45) – Dunnellon, Tampa	North end of US 41/SR 45/SR 121 concurrency
Levy		2.945	4.740	CR 335A	
Levy		4.820	7.757	CR 241 north (Northeast 150th Avenue)	Southern terminus of CR 241
Levy		9.426	15.170	CR 335 east	Western terminus of CR 335
Levy	Bronson	11.985	19.288	CR 337 north (Court Street)	Southern terminus of CR 337
Levy	Bronson	12.094	19.463	CR 337 south – Henry Beck Park	Northern terminus of CR 337
Levy	Bronson	12.559	20.212	SR 24 (Thrasher Drive) – Cedar Key, Archer	
Levy		14.203	22.858	CR 32 east	Western terminus of CR 32
Levy		14.846	23.892	CR 339A south – Blue Springs	Northern terminus of CR 339A
Levy		15.785	25.403	CR 339 north – Trenton	Southern terminus of CR 339
Levy		19.107	30.750	CR 339A north (Northeast 20th Avenue)	Southern terminus of CR 339A
Levy		22.101	35.568	CR 134 (Northwest 10th Avenue) – Levyville	
Levy	Turkeytown	24.110	38.801	CR 345 north / CR 347 south (Northwest 30th Avenue)	Southern terminus of CR 345; northern terminus of CR 347
Levy	Chiefland	25.468	40.987	SR 345 south	Northern terminus of SR 345
Levy	Chiefland	26.652	42.892	US 19 south / US 98 south (SR 55) – Inglis, Cedar Key, St. Petersburg	North end of SR 500 concurrency; south end of SR 55 concurrency
see US 19 (mile 148.043-214.672)
Taylor	Perry	93.281	150.121	US 19 north / US 27 / US 98 west / US 221 Truck north (Hampton Springs Avenue / Byron Butler Parkway / SR 20 / SR 30 west) – Tallahassee	Northern terminus; north end of US 19/US 98 concurrency
1.000 mi = 1.609 km; 1.000 km = 0.621 mi: Concurrency terminus

== Georgia ==
=== Attapulgus business loop ===
U.S. Highway 27 Business
- Location: Attapulgus, Georgia
- Length: 3.473 mi (5.589 km)
- Existed: 1995–present

U.S. Highway 27 Business (US 27 Bus.) is a 3.473-mile-long (5.589 km) business route of US 27 that partially exists in the city limits of Attapulgus, Georgia. It is concurrent with State Route 1 Business (SR 1 Bus.) for its entire length. US 27 Bus./SR 1 Bus. begin at an intersection with US 27/SR 1 east-southeast of Attapulgus. It travels to the west-southwest and curves to the northwest. At the city limits of Attapulgus, it curves to a due-west direction. It travels just south of Lillian E. Williams Elementary School and then intersects the northern terminus of SR 241 (South Main Street). It curves to a nearly due-north direction before leaving the city. It travels through rural areas of the county before a curve to the northeast. It meets its northern terminus, a second intersection with US 27/SR 1 (Tallahassee Highway), which is also the southern terminus of Hodges–Riley Road. The entire length of US 27 Bus./SR 1 Bus. is part of the National Highway System, a system of routes determined to be the most important for the nation's economy, mobility, and defense.

The roadway that would eventually become US 27 Bus./SR 1 Bus. was established at least as early as 1919 as part of SR 1. In the first half of 1936, this segment had a "completed hard surface". Between the beginning of 1953 and the 1960, SR 1 was routed on a more direct path between Amsterdam and Attapulgus, with a "soil surface". In 1989, an eastern bypass of Attapulgus, designated as SR 831, was proposed from east-southeast of the city to north-northwest of it. In 1995, US 27/SR 1 was shifted onto this bypass. Its former path was redesignated as SR 1 Bus. Between the beginning of 1996 and the beginning of 2011, US 27 Bus. was designated on the path of SR 1 Bus.

Major intersections

The entire route is in Decatur County.

Location	mi	km	Destinations	Notes
	0.000	0.000	US 27 / SR 1 – Tallahassee, Bainbridge	Southern terminus of US 27 Bus./SR 1 Bus.; south end of SR 1 Bus. concurrency
Attapulgus	1.436	2.311	SR 241 south (South Main Street) / North Main Street north – Quincy, Fla.	Northern terminus of SR 241; southern terminus of North Main Street
	3.473	5.589	US 27 / SR 1 (Tallahassee Highway) / Hodges–Riley Road north – Tallahassee, Bainbridge	Northern terminus of US 27 Bus./SR 1 Bus.; north end of SR 1 Bus. concurrency; southern terminus of Hodges–Riley Road
1.000 mi = 1.609 km; 1.000 km = 0.621 mi: Concurrency terminus

=== Bainbridge business loop ===
U.S. Highway 27 Business
- Location: Bainbridge, Georgia
- Length: 3.429 mi (5.518 km)
- Existed: 1964–present

U.S. Highway 27 Business (US 27 Bus.) is a 3.429-mile-long (5.518 km) business route of US 27 that exists completely within the city limits of Bainbridge, Georgia. It is concurrent with State Route 1 Business (SR 1 Bus.) for its entire length. It begins at an interchange with US 27/US 84/SR 1/SR 38, which is a freeway-grade bypass of downtown Bainbridge. US 27 Bus./SR 1 Bus. travels to the north-northwest on Tallahassee Highway. The name changes to Scott Street at an intersection with College Street. At Shotwell Street, they begin a concurrency with US 84 Bus./SR 38 Bus. The four highways head on a due-west direction. At South Broad Street, US 27 Bus./SR 1 Bus. ends its concurrency with US 84 Bus./SR 38 Bus. and begins one with SR 97/SR 309. They pass Willis Park and then split at Calhoun Street, with SR 97/SR 309 heading east and US 27 Bus./SR 1 Bus. heading west. They curve to the west-northwest and cross over the Flint River. After this crossing, the local name changes to Dothan Road. At Newton Road, they begin a brief concurrency with SR 253; at Spring Creek Road, SR 253 splits off. They then reach their northern terminus, another interchange with the US 27/US 84/SR 1/SR 38 bypass. Here, US 84/SR 38 takes on the Dothan Road name; US 27/SR 1 uses the Colquitt Highway name. The roadway that would eventually become US 27 Bus./SR 1 Bus. was established at least as early as 1919 as part of SR 1. By the end of 1934, US 27 was designated on SR 1 in the area. By the end of 1939, this segment of US 27/SR 1 had a "completed hard surface". Between the beginning of 1960 and the beginning of 1965, US 27 (and possibly SR 1) in the Bainbridge area was shifted onto the bypass, at the time designated as SR 38 Loop. The former path of US 27 was redesignated US 27 Bus. By the beginning of 1977, SR 1 Bus. was indicated to be designated on US 27 Bus. in the city. In 1976, SR 38 Loop was decommissioned, with the SR 38 mainline designated on its former path. The former path of SR 38 was redesignated as SR 38 Bus.

Major intersections

The entire route is in Bainbridge, Decatur County.

mi	km	Destinations	Notes
0.000	0.000	US 27 / US 84 / SR 1 / SR 38 / SR 1 Bus. begins – Donalsonville, Cairo, Bainbridge College, Memorial Hospital and Manor	Southern terminus of US 27 Bus./SR 1 Bus.; south end of SR 1 Bus. concurrency; interchange
0.931	1.498	US 84 Bus. east / SR 38 Bus. east (Shotwell Street) – Cairo, Memorial Hospital and Manor	South end of US 84 Bus./SR 38 Bus. concurrency
1.391	2.239	US 84 Bus. west / SR 38 Bus. west / SR 97 south / SR 309 south (Shotwell Street)	North end of US 84 Bus./SR 38 Bus. concurrency; south end of SR 97/SR 309 concurrency
1.753	2.821	SR 97 north / SR 309 north (Calhoun Street) to SR 262	North end of SR 97/SR 309 concurrency
2.498	4.020	SR 253 north (Newton Road) – Newton	South end of SR 253 concurrency
2.876	4.628	SR 253 south (Spring Creek Road) – Seminole St. Pk.	North end of SR 253 concurrency
3.429	5.518	US 27 / SR 1 (Colquitt Highway) / US 84 / SR 38 (Dothan Road) / SR 1 Bus. ends – Donalsonville, Dothan, Colquitt, Blakely	Northern terminus of US 27 Bus./SR 1 Bus.; north end of SR 1 Bus. concurrency; interchange
1.000 mi = 1.609 km; 1.000 km = 0.621 mi: Concurrency terminus

=== Blakely business loop ===
U.S. Highway 27 Business
- Location: Blakely, Georgia
- Length: 4.314 mi (6.943 km)
- Existed: 1993–present

State Route 1 Business
- Location: Blakely, Georgia

U.S. Highway 27 Business (US 27 Bus.) is a 4.314-mile-long (6.943 km) business route of US 27 that exists completely within the city limits of Blakely, Georgia. It travels concurrent with State Route 1 Business (SR 1 Bus.) for its entire length. US 27 Bus./SR 1 Bus. begins at an intersection with US 27/SR 1 in the southeastern part of the city. They travel northwest on South Main Street and curve to a nearly due-north direction just before an intersection with SR 39 (East South Boulevard). US 27 Bus./SR 1 Bus./SR 39 continue to the north. Just to the east of Early County High and Middle schools, SR 62 (Columbia Street) joins the concurrency. This intersection also marks the western terminus of Bob White Avenue. Two blocks later, the concurrency begins to travel around the town square. On the east side of this square, SR 62 departs the concurrency. The concurrent highways continue northward, crossing over some railroad tracks of Norfolk Southern Railway and intersect SR 62 Byp. (Martin Luther King Jr. Boulevard). At this intersection, SR 39 departs the concurrency. US 27 Bus./SR 1 Bus. begins curving to the northwest and head to the east-southeast just before reaching their northern terminus, a second intersection with US 27/SR 1. Between the beginning of 1920 and the end of 1921, the Colquitt–Cuthbert section, which formerly traveled through Arlington and Edison, was shifted westward to travel through Blakely. By the end of 1934, US 27 was designated on all of SR 1. By the end of 1939, all of US 27/SR 1 in the Blakely area had a "completed hard surface". In 1992, an eastern bypass of Blakely, designated as SR 838, was proposed from south-southeast of the city to north-northeast of it. The next year, US 27/SR 1 in the Blakely area was shifted eastward, onto the path of SR 838. The former path through the city became US 27 Bus./SR 1 Bus.

Major intersections

The entire route is in Blakely, Early County.

mi	km	Destinations	Notes
0.000	0.000	US 27 / SR 1 / SR 1 Bus. begins – Bainbridge, Cuthbert	Southern terminus of US 27 Bus./SR 1 Bus.; south end of SR 1 Bus. concurrency
0.899	1.447	SR 39 south (East South Boulevard) – Donalsonville	South end of SR 39 concurrency
1.573	2.531	SR 62 west (Columbia Street) / Bob White Avenue east	South end of SR 62 concurrency; western terminus of Bob White Avenue
1.754	2.823	SR 62 east (Magnolia Street) to SR 200	North end of SR 62 concurrency
2.752	4.429	SR 39 north / SR 62 Byp. (Martin Luther King Jr. Boulevard) – Fort Gaines, Albany	North end of SR 39 concurrency
4.315	6.944	US 27 / SR 1 / SR 1 Bus. ends – Colquitt, Bluffton	Northern terminus of US 27 Bus./SR 1 Bus.; north end of SR 1 Bus.
1.000 mi = 1.609 km; 1.000 km = 0.621 mi: Concurrency terminus

=== Cuthbert business loop ===
U.S. Highway 27 Business
- Location: Cuthbert, Georgia
- Length: 3.334 mi (5.366 km)
- Existed: 1994–present

State Route 1 Business
- Location: Cuthbert, Georgia

U.S. Highway 27 Business (US 27 Bus.) is a 3.334-mile-long (5.366 km) business route of US 27 that partially exists in the city limits of Cuthbert, Georgia. It is concurrent with State Route 1 Business (SR 1 Bus.) for its entire length. US 27 Bus./SR 1 Bus. starts at an intersection with US 27/SR 1 south of Cuthbert. They travel on Blakely Street to the northwest and curve to the north-northeast. Just south of the city limits, they intersect the northern terminus of Edison Highway, which leads to SR 216. They cross over some railroad tracks of Norfolk Southern Railway. In downtown, they intersect US 82/SR 50 at the town square (which functions like a traffic circle around a memorial park). The four highways have a brief concurrency around the town square. After departing the town square, US 27/SR 1 curves to the north-northwest before resuming its north-northeast direction. After crossing over Town Branch, US 27 Bus./SR 1 Bus. leaves the city limits. It curves to the northeast and reaches its northern terminus, a second intersection with US 27/SR 1. The roadway that would eventually become US 27 Bus./SR 1 Bus. was established at least as early as 1919 as part of SR 1 from Edison, through Cuthbert, and into Lumpkin. By the end of 1921, the Colquitt–Cuthbert segment was shifted westward to travel through Blakely. By the end of 1934, US 27 was designated on the entire length of SR 1. In 1938, the northern two-thirds of the Randolph County portion of the Blakely–Cuthbert segment had a "completed hard surface". In the third quarter of 1939, the southern part of the Randolph County portion of the Cuthbert–Lumpkin segment also had a completed hard surface. In 1993, a southeastern bypass of Cuthbert, designated as SR 847, was proposed from south-southwest of the city to north-northeast of it. The next year, the path of US 27/SR 1 through the Cuthbert area was shifted eastward, onto SR 847. The former path was redesignated as US 27 Bus./SR 1 Bus.

Major intersections

The entire route is in Randolph County.

Location	mi	km	Destinations	Notes
	0.000	0.000	US 27 / SR 1 / SR 1 Bus. begins	Southern terminus of US 27 Bus./SR 1 Bus.; south end of SR 1 Bus. concurrency
	0.607	0.977	Edison Highway south to SR 216	Northern terminus of Edison Highway
Cuthbert	1.701	2.737	US 82 west / SR 50 west (West Dawson Street) – Georgetown, Eufaula, AL, Andrew College	South end of US 82/SR 50 concurrency on one-way street around town square
Cuthbert	1.744	2.807	US 82 east / SR 50 east (Martin Luther King Jr. Street) – Dawson	North end of US 82/SR 50 concurrency on one-way street around town square
	3.334	5.366	US 27 / SR 1 / SR 1 Bus. ends	Northern terminus of US 27 Bus./SR 1 Bus.; north end of SR 1 Bus. concurrency
1.000 mi = 1.609 km; 1.000 km = 0.621 mi: Concurrency terminus

=== Lumpkin connector route ===
State Route 1 Connector
- Location: Lumpkin, Georgia
- Length: 0.719 mi (1,157 m)
- Existed: 2001–present

State Route 1 Connector (SR 1 Conn.) is a 0.719-mile-long (1.157 km) connecting route of SR 1 that exists almost entirely within the city limits of Lumpkin, Georgia. It begins at an intersection with SR 27 (Broad Street) in the west-central part of the city. It travels nearly due north on Chestnut Street for one block to an intersection with the eastern terminus of SR 39 Conn. (Florence Street). It curves to the north-northeast and crosses over some railroad tracks of CSX Transportation before leaving the city. Almost immediately, it curves to the northwest and reaches its northern terminus, an intersection with US 27/SR 1. In 2001, SR 1 Conn. was established on its current path.

Major intersections

The entire route is in Stewart County.

Location	mi	km	Destinations	Notes
Lumpkin	0.000	0.000	SR 27 (Broad Street) – Eufaula, Ala, Georgetown, Richland, Cuthbert	Southern terminus
Lumpkin	0.120	0.193	SR 39 Conn. west (Florence Street)	Eastern terminus of SR 39 Conn.
	0.719	1.157	US 27 / SR 1 – Cuthbert, Cusseta	Northern terminus
1.000 mi = 1.609 km; 1.000 km = 0.621 mi

=== Columbus business loop ===
State Route 1 Business
- Location: Columbus, Georgia
- Existed: 1966–1975

State Route 1 Business (SR 1 Bus.) was a business route of SR 1 that existed mostly within Columbus, Georgia. The roadway that would eventually become SR 1 Bus. was established at least as early as 1919 as part of SR 1 in the Columbus metropolitan area. Between the end of 1926 and the end of 1929, the entire length of highway in the area had a "completed hard surface". Between the beginning of 1953 and the beginning of 1964, a freeway in the eastern part of Columbus was under construction from US 27/US 280/SR 1 (Victory Drive) southeast of the city to SR 357 (Buena Vista Road). It was projected from there to US 27/SR 1 north-northeast of the city. In 1966, SR 1 was designated on this freeway. Its former path through Columbus was redesignated as SR 1 Bus. In 1975, this freeway was redesignated as part of Interstate 185 (I-185; with the unsigned designation SR 411). SR 1 was reverted onto its former path, replacing SR 1 Bus.

Major intersections

The entire route was in Columbus, Muscogee County.

mi	km	Destinations	Notes
		US 27 south / US 280 east / SR 1	Southern terminus of SR 1 Bus.; south end of US 27 and US 280 concurrencies
		SR 357 (Fort Benning Road)	
		SR 85 south (Lumpkin Road)	South end of SR 85 concurrency
		SR 85 north (Lumpkin Road)	North end of SR 85 concurrency
		US 80 west / US 280 west / SR 1 Spur west (4th Street)	Eastern terminus of SR 1 Spur; north end of US 280 concurrency; south end of US 80 concurrency
		SR 22 east / SR 103 south (13th Street)	South end of SR 22 and SR 103 concurrencies
		SR 22 west / SR 85 south (14th Street)	North end of SR 22 concurrency; south end of SR 85 concurrency
		SR 103 north (River Road)	North end of SR 103 concurrency
		US 27 Alt. north / US 80 east / SR 85 north (Columbus–Manchester Road)	Southern terminus of US 27 Alt.; north end of US 80 and SR 85 concurrencies
		US 27 north / SR 1	Northern terminus
1.000 mi = 1.609 km; 1.000 km = 0.621 mi: Concurrency terminus

=== Columbus spur route 1 ===
State Route 1 Spur
- Location: Columbus, Georgia
- Existed: 1946–1969

State Route 1 Spur (SR 1 Spur) was a spur route of SR 1 that existed entirely within Muscogee County, Georgia. Between the end of 1921 and the end of 1926, the roadway that would eventually become SR 1 Spur was established as an unnumbered road, with a "completed hard surface", from the southwestern part of Fort Benning north-northeast to SR 1 southeast of Columbus. In 1934, this road's northern terminus was shifted northwest to just southeast of Columbus. Early the next year, this road was under construction. At the end of the year, it again had a completed hard surface. Between the beginning of 1945 and November 1946, it was designated as SR 1 Spur. By February 1948, it was extended northwest into Columbus, on Cusseta Road, then right onto 10th Avenue, and then left on 8th Street to end at US 27/US 280/SR 1. Between April 1949 and August 1950, its northern terminus was shifted east-northeast, onto Brown Avenue, to end at SR 103 (Buena Vista Road). Between the beginning of 1953 and the beginning of 1964, SR 1 Spur's northern terminus was truncated to its original point, at US 27/US 280/SR 1 north of Fort Benning. Its former path north of US 27/US 280/SR 1 on Fort Benning Road was redesignated as SR 357; its path on Cusseta Road and Brown Avenue was redesignated as SR 103 Spur. In 1969, SR 357 was extended south-southwest, replacing all of SR 1 Spur.

Major intersections

This table shows SR 1 Spur at its greatest extent (1948 to 1949). The entire route was in Muscogee County.

Location	mi	km	Destinations	Notes
Fort Benning			SR 85 north	Southern terminus of SR 1 Spur and SR 85
			US 27 / US 280 / SR 1	
Columbus			US 27 / US 280 / SR 1	Northern terminus
1.000 mi = 1.609 km; 1.000 km = 0.621 mi

=== Columbus spur route 2 ===
State Route 1 Spur
- Location: Columbus, Georgia
- Existed: 1963–1988

State Route 1 Spur (SR 1 Spur) was a spur route of SR 1 that existed entirely within the city limits of Columbus, Georgia. Between June 1960 and June 1963, it was established on 4th Street from the Alabama state line to US 27/US 280/SR 1 (4th Avenue). Between the beginning of 1953 and the beginning of 1964, US 280 in Columbus was shifted southwestward onto the path of SR 1 Spur. In 1967, US 80's path in Columbus was shifted southeastward, onto the path of US 27/SR 1, then onto US 280/SR 1 Spur. In 1988, SR 55 in the Columbus metropolitan area and SR 1 Spur were redesignated as part of SR 520. At this time, US 80 was shifted northward, off this path.

Major intersections

The entire route was in Columbus, Muscogee County.

mi	km	Destinations	Notes
		US 80 west / US 280 west	Western terminus at the Alabama state line; west end of US 80/US 280 concurrency
		US 27 / US 80 east / US 280 east / SR 1	Eastern terminus; east end of US 80/US 280 concurrency
1.000 mi = 1.609 km; 1.000 km = 0.621 mi: Concurrency terminus

=== Columbus–Carrollton alternate route ===
U.S. Highway 27 Alternate
- Location: Columbus–Carrollton, Georgia
- Length: 94.118 mi (151.468 km)

U.S. Highway 27 Alternate (US 27 Alt.) is an alternate route of US 27 from Columbus to Carrollton in the U.S. state of Georgia. While the main line of US 27 travels through LaGrange, US 27 Alt. veers to the east to serve the towns of Warm Springs, Greenville, and Newnan.

=== LaGrange spur route ===
State Route 1 Spur
- Location: LaGrange, Georgia
- Existed: 1963–1971

State Route 1 Spur (SR 1 Spur) was a short-lived spur route of SR 1 that existed entirely within the city limits of LaGrange, Georgia. Between June 1963 and the end of 1965, it was established from US 27/SR 1/SR 219 (Hamilton Road) in the south-central part of downtown LaGrange north-northwest to US 29/SR 14/SR 109 (Broad Street) in the western part. In 1971, SR 1 in the city was shifted westward, replacing the spur route.

Major intersections'

The entire route was in LaGrange, Troup County.

mi	km	Destinations	Notes
		US 27 / SR 1 / SR 219 (Hamilton Road)	Southern terminus
		US 29 / SR 14 / SR 109 (Broad Street)	Northern terminus
1.000 mi = 1.609 km; 1.000 km = 0.621 mi

=== Bremen business loop ===
U.S. Highway 27 Business
- Location: Bremen, Georgia
- Length: 4.744 mi (7.635 km)
- Existed: 1993–present

State Route 1 Business
- Location: Bremen, Georgia

U.S. Highway 27 Business (US 27 Bus.) is a 4.744-mile-long (7.635 km) business route of US 27 that exists almost entirely within the city limits of Bremen, Georgia. It is concurrent with State Route 1 Business (SR 1 Bus.) for its entire length. US 27 Bus./SR 1 begins at an intersection with US 27/SR 1 in the southern part of the city, just north of I-20, in the north-central part of Carroll County. The business routes head to the northeast, enter Haralson County, and briefly leave the city limits. Just after reentering, they travel under a railroad bridge that carries railroad tracks of Norfolk Southern Railway. They curve to the north-northwest and pass Higgins General Hospital at a point just west of Bremen High School. They intersect US 78/SR 8 (Atlantic Avenue/Pacific Avenue). Immediately on the north side of the intersection are railroad tracks for Southern and Norfolk Southern railways. They continue to the north-northwest and leave the city again before reaching their northern terminus, a second intersection with US 27/SR 1 north-northwest of the city. The entire length of US 27 Bus./SR 1 Bus. is part of the National Highway System, a system of routes determined to be the most important for the nation's economy, mobility, and defense.

The roadway that would eventually become US 27 Bus./SR 1 Bus. was established at least as early as 1919 as part of SR 1. By the end of 1934, US 27 was designated on the entire length of SR 1. In the second quarter of 1935, a portion in the northern part of Bremen had a "completed hard surface". Between September 1938 and July 1939, a portion in the southern part of the city also had a completed hard surface. About 50 years later, in 1988, a western bypass of Bremen, designated as SR 793, was proposed from south-southwest of the city to north-northwest of it. In 1993, US 27/SR 1 in the Bremen area was shifted westward, onto the path of SR 793. The former path was redesignated as US 27 Bus./SR 1 Bus.

Major intersections

County	Location	mi	km	Destinations	Notes
Carroll	Bremen	0.000	0.000	US 27 / SR 1 / SR 1 Bus. begins to I-20 – Carrollton, Cedartown	Southern terminus of US 27 Bus./SR 1 Bus.; south end of SR 1 Bus. concurrency
Haralson	Bremen	2.374	3.821	US 78 / SR 8 (Atlantic Avenue/Pacific Avenue) – Tallapoosa, Villa Rica	
Haralson		4.744	7.635	US 27 / SR 1 / SR 1 Bus. ends – Carrollton, Buchanan, Cedartown	Northern terminus of US 27 Bus./SR 1 Bus.; north end of SR 1 Bus. concurrency
1.000 mi = 1.609 km; 1.000 km = 0.621 mi: Concurrency terminus

=== Buchanan business loop ===
U.S. Highway 27 Business
- Location: Buchanan, Georgia
- Length: 2.397 mi (3.858 km)
- Existed: 1992–present

State Route 1 Business
- Location: Buchanan, Georgia

U.S. Highway 27 Business (US 27 Bus.) is a 2.397-mile-long (3.858 km) business route of US 27 that partially exists in the city limits of Buchanan, Georgia. It is concurrent with State Route 1 Business (SR 1 Bus.) for its entire length. US 27 Bus./SR 1 Bus. begins at an intersection with US 27/SR 1 southeast of Buchanan. Here, the roadway continues as Hilltop Drive. The business routes travel to the northwest, paralleling some railroad tracks of the Norfolk Southern Railway. They enter Buchanan and curve to the north-northwest. After intersecting SR 120, it travels on a bridge over the railroad tracks, which switch to the west side of the business routes. They travel just to the west of Buchanan Primary and Elementary schools and just to the east of the Buchanan City Cemetery. They leave Buchanan and curve to the north-northeast before reaching their northern terminus, a second intersection with US 27/SR 1 north of the city. The entire length of US 27 Bus./SR 1 Bus. is part of the National Highway System, a system of routes determined to be the most important for the nation's economy, mobility, and defense.

The roadway that would eventually become US 27/SR 1 was established at least as early as 1919 as part of SR 1. Between April and October 1934, a portion in the southern part of Buchanan had a "completed hard surface". By the end of the year, US 27 was designated on SR 1. In the third quarter of 1939, a portion in the northern part of the city had a completed hard surface. About 50 years later, in 1989, SR 811 was proposed from US 27/SR 1 south-southeast of Buchanan north-northwest across US 27/SR 1 and curved around the east side of the city to a point north-northwest of it. In 1992, US 27/SR 1 was rerouted onto the proposed path of SR 811 and was shifted east of the city. The former path was redesignated as US 27 Bus./SR 1 Bus.

Major intersections

The entire route is in Haralson County.

Location	mi	km	Destinations	Notes
	0.000	0.000	US 27 / SR 1 / SR 1 Bus. begins / Hilltop Drive south – Bremen, Cedartown, Rome	Southern terminus of US 27 Bus./SR 1 Bus.; northern terminus of Hilltop Drive; south end of SR 1 Bus. concurrency
Buchanan	1.413	2.274	SR 120 – Tallapoosa, Dallas	
	2.397	3.858	US 27 / SR 1 / SR 1 Bus. ends / Tallapoosa East Church Road north – Bremen, Cedartown, Rome	Northern terminus of US 27 Bus./SR 1 Bus.; southern terminus of Tallapoosa East Church Road; north end of SR 1 concurrency
1.000 mi = 1.609 km; 1.000 km = 0.621 mi: Concurrency terminus

=== Cedartown business loop ===
U.S. Highway 27 Business
- Location: Cedartown, Georgia
- Length: 4.222 mi (6.795 km)
- Existed: 1991–present

State Route 1 Business
- Location: Cedartown, Georgia

U.S. Highway 27 Business (US 27 Bus.) is a 4.222-mile-long (6.795 km) business route of US 27 that exists entirely within the city limits of Cedartown, Georgia. It is concurrent with State Route 1 Business (SR 1 Bus.) for its entire length. US 27 Bus./SR 1 Bus. begins at an intersection with US 27/SR 1/SR 100 (Martha Berry Highway) in the southern part of the city. This intersection is just north of the Cedar Valley Country Club. The business routes travel to the southeast and curve to the northwest. They travel on an overpass over US 27/SR 1/SR 100 and curve to the north-northwest and briefly parallel some railroad tracks of Norfolk Southern Railway. They intersect US 278/SR 6/SR 100 (Canal Street/Martin Luther King Jr. Boulevard). They pass the Cedartown Welcome Center and cross over some railroad tracks of CSX Transportation. In downtown Cedartown, they pass Polk County Court House No. 2. They curve to the north-northeast and travel just to the west of Greenwood Cemetery. Then, they travel to the east of Peek Forest Park and Springdale Lake. They curve to the northeast and reach their northern terminus, a second intersection with US 27/SR 1 (Martha Berry Highway). Here, the roadway continues as Davis Road. The entire length of US 27 Bus./SR 1 Bus. is part of the National Highway System, a system of routes determined to be the most important for the nation's economy, mobility, and defense.

The roadway that would eventually become US 27 Bus./SR 1 Bus. was established at least as early as 1919 as part of SR 1. By the end of 1934, US 27 was designated on the entire length of SR 1. In the first half of 1936, a portion of US 27/SR 1 in the southern half of the city had a "completed hard surface". Between September 1938 and July 1939, the portion in the northern part of the city also had a completed hard surface. In 1987, an eastern bypass of Cedartown, designated as SR 744, was proposed from south-southwest of the city to north-northeast of it. In 1991, US 27/SR 1 in the Cedartown area was shifted eastward, onto the path of SR 744, with US 278/SR 6, which was also shifted out of the main part of the city. The former path of US 27/SR 1 was redesignated as US 27 Bus./SR 1 Bus.

Major intersections

The entire route is in Cedartown, Polk County.

mi	km	Destinations	Notes
0.000	0.000	US 27 / SR 1 / SR 100 (Martha Berry Highway) / SR 1 Bus. begins – Buchanan, Rome	Southern terminus of US 27 Bus./SR 1 Bus.; south end of SR 1 Bus. concurrency
1.272	2.047	US 278 / SR 6 / SR 100 (Canal Street/Martin Luther King Jr. Boulevard) – Piedmont, Rockmart	
4.222	6.795	US 27 / SR 1 / SR 1 Bus. ends (Martha Berry Highway) / Davis Road east – Buchanan, Bremen, Rome, Summerville	Northern terminus of US 27 Bus./SR 1 Bus.; western terminus of Davis Road; north end of SR 1 Bus. concurrency
1.000 mi = 1.609 km; 1.000 km = 0.621 mi: Concurrency terminus

=== Floyd County spur route ===
State Route 1 Spur
- Location: Floyd County, Georgia
- Existed: 1946–1955

State Route 1 Spur (SR 1 Spur) was a short-lived spur route of SR 1 that existed in the south-central part of Floyd County, Georgia. The roadway that would eventually become SR 1 Spur was established at least as early as 1919 as part of SR 1. By the end of 1934, US 27 was designated on the entire length of SR 1. At the end of 1937, a portion south-southwest of Rome had a "completed hard surface". The next year, the entire Floyd County portion of US 27/SR 1 had a completed hard surface. Between the beginning of 1945 and November 1946, SR 1's path south-southwest of Rome was shifted eastward. Its former path on US 27 was redesignated as SR 1 Spur. Between June 1954 and June 1955, SR 1 was reverted onto its old path, replacing SR 1 Spur. Its former path, east of US 27 was redesignated as SR 1E.

Major intersections

The entire route was in Floyd County.

Location	mi	km	Destinations	Notes
			US 27 south / SR 1	Southern terminus; south end of US 27 concurrency
			US 27 north / US 411 / SR 53	Northern terminus; north end of US 27 concurrency
1.000 mi = 1.609 km; 1.000 km = 0.621 mi: Concurrency terminus

=== Rome loop route ===
State Route 1 Loop
- Location: Rome, Georgia
- Length: 11.758 mi (18.923 km)
- Existed: 1992–present

State Route 1 Loop (SR 1 Loop) is an 11.758-mile-long (18.923 km) loop route of SR 1 that exists in the east-central part of Floyd County, Georgia, almost entirely within the city limits of Rome. It begins at an intersection with US 411/SR 20 in the extreme southeastern corner of Rome. Here, the roadway continues as Mathis Road. It travels to the north-northeast and crosses over the Etowah River. SR 1 Loop curves to the north-northwest, leaves the city limits, and intersects SR 293 (Kingston Road). It curves to the northwest and travels on a bridge over some railroad tracks of Norfolk Southern Railway before reentering the city limits of Rome. Almost immediately is an intersection with SR 53 (New Calhoun Highway). It curves to the west-southwest and passes AdventHealth Stadium, the home stadium of the Minor League Baseball team Rome Emperors. The loop crosses over the Oostanaula River before intersecting US 27/SR 1 on the southeastern corner of Berry College. On the southwestern corner, it crosses over Little Dry Creek. The highway curves to the northwest and travels to the north of AdventHealth Redmond. It travels to the west and curves to the south. It crosses over some railroad tracks of Norfolk Southern Railway. SR 1 Loop curves to the southwest and crosses over more railroad tracks of Norfolk Southern Railway before reaching its northern terminus, a second intersection with SR 20. Here, the roadway continues as Coosawattee Avenue. The entire current length of SR 1 Loop (and the entire length of the unbuilt portion in between the two sections) is part of the National Highway System, a system of routes determined to be the most important for the nation's economy, mobility, and defense.

In 1985, SR 53 Spur was built from US 27/SR 1 just south of Mount Berry to SR 53 northeast of Rome; it was proposed to be extended west-northwest and south-southwest to SR 20 west-northwest of Rome. SR 746 was proposed from US 411/SR 20 southeast of Rome north-northeast and northwest to tie into the path of SR 53 Spur at an intersection with SR 53. The next year, the portion west of US 27/SR 1 was cancelled. In 1990, SR 746 was built from US 411/SR 20 to SR 293 east-northeast of Rome. In 1992, all of SR 53 Spur and SR 746's completed section were redesignated as SR 1 Loop, with the segment between SR 293 and SR 53 between them completed, as well. The next year, SR 1 Loop was completed from SR 20 west-northwest of Rome to US 27/SR 1 in Mount Berry.

Major intersections

The entire route is in Floyd County.

Location	mi	km	Destinations	Notes
Rome	0.000	0.000	US 411 / SR 20 / Mathis Road south – Rome, Cartersville	Southern terminus of SR 1 Loop; northern terminus of Mathis Road
	2.880	4.635	SR 293 (Kingston Road) – Rome, Driving Range, National Guard Armory	
Rome	5.462	8.790	SR 53 (New Calhoun Highway) – Cave Spring, Calhoun, Fairmount	
Rome	8.067	12.983	US 27 / SR 1 (Martha Berry Boulevard) – Berry College, Stonebridge Golf Club, Shorter University	
Rome	11.758	18.923	SR 20 (Shorter Avenue) / Coosawattee Avenue south	Northern terminus of SR 1 Loop and Coosawattee Avenue
1.000 mi = 1.609 km; 1.000 km = 0.621 mi

=== Rome spur route ===
State Route 1 Spur
- Location: Rome, Georgia
- Existed: 1960–1966

State Route 1 Spur (SR 1 Spur) was a spur route of SR 1 Spur that existed entirely within the city limits of Rome, Georgia. Between July 1957 and June 1960, it was established on East 12th Street from US 27/US 411/SR 1/SR 53 (Cave Spring Road) east-southeast to SR 101 (Dean Avenue). By June 1963, US 411 in the east part of the city was routed onto SR 101 at the eastern terminus of SR 1 Spur. In 1966, it was redesignated as SR 53 Spur.

Major intersections

The entire route was in Rome, Floyd County.

mi	km	Destinations	Notes
		US 27 / US 411 / SR 1 / SR 53 (Cave Spring Road)	Western terminus
		SR 1E (Maple Avenue)	
		US 411 / SR 101 (Dean Avenue)	Eastern terminus
1.000 mi = 1.609 km; 1.000 km = 0.621 mi

=== LaFayette business loop ===
U.S. Highway 27 Business
- Location: LaFayette, Georgia
- Length: 3.345 mi (5.383 km)
- Existed: 1988–present

U.S. Highway 27 Business (US 27 Bus.) is a 3.345-mile-long (5.383 km) business route of US 27 that exists entirely within the city limits of LaFayette, Georgia. It is concurrent with State Route 1 Business (SR 1 Bus. for its entire length. US 27 Bus./SR 1 Bus. begins at an intersection with US 27/SR 1 in the southeastern part of the city. They travel to the west-northwest and curve to the northwest. The business routes cross over Town Creek and curve to the north-northeast. They begin a concurrency with SR 193 (West Main Street). Just over 1,000 feet (300 m) later, SR 193 splits off onto East Villanow Street. This intersection is southwest of LaFayette Cemetery. They pass the Joe Stock Memorial Park and travel west of LaFayette Middle School before reaching their northern terminus, an intersection with US 27/SR 1/SR 136 (Lyle Jones Parkway/North Main Street) in the northern part of the city. The entire length of US 27 Bus./SR 1 Bus. is part of the National Highway System, a system of routes determined to be the most important for the nation's economy, mobility, and defense.

The roadway that would eventually become US 27 Bus./SR 1 Bus. was established at least as early as 1919 as part of SR 1 in the LaFayette area. Between October 1929 and June 1930, a portion in the southern part of LaFayette had a "completed hard surface". By the end of 1930, US 41W was designated on SR 1 from Rome to LaFayette. By the beginning of 1932, a portion of US 41W/SR 1 in the northern part of the city had a completed hard surface. By the end of 1934, US 41W was decommissioned, and US 27 was designated on the entire length of SR 1. Nearly 50 years later, an eastern bypass of LaFayette, designated as SR 730, was proposed from southeast of the city to north-northeast of it. In 1988, US 27/SR 1 in the area was shifted eastward, onto the path of SR 730. Its former path through the city was redesignated as US 27 Bus./SR 1 Bus.

Major intersections

The entire route is in LaFayette, Walker County.

mi	km	Destinations	Notes
0.000	0.000	US 27 / SR 1 / SR 1 Bus. begins – Summerville, Ft Oglethorpe	Southern terminus of US 27 Bus./SR 1 Bus.; south end of SR 1 Bus. concurrency
0.757	1.218	SR 193 north (West Main Street) – Davis Cross Rd., Max Stoker Recreation Center, Soccer Fields, Lowell Greene Ball Field, Crockford–Pigeon Mtn Wildlife Management Area	South end of SR 193 concurrency
1.036	1.667	SR 193 south (East Villanow Street) to SR 136	North end of SR 193 concurrency
3.345	5.383	US 27 / SR 1 / SR 136 (Lyle Jones Parkway/North Main Street) / SR 1 Bus. ends / West McCarter Road west – Chattanooga, Georgia Northwestern Technical College	Northern terminus of US 27 Bus./SR 1 Bus.; eastern terminus of West McCarter Road; north end of SR 1 Bus. concurrency
1.000 mi = 1.609 km; 1.000 km = 0.621 mi: Concurrency terminus

== Tennessee ==
=== Chattanooga business route ===
U.S. Route 27 Business
- Location: Chattanooga, Tennessee

=== Dayton business route ===
U.S. Route 27 Business
- Location: Dayton, Tennessee

== Kentucky ==
=== Nicholasville business route ===
U.S. Route 27 Business
- Location: Nicholasville, Kentucky
- Length: 3.890 mi (6.260 km)

U.S. Route 27 Business (US 27 Bus.) is a 3.890-mile-long (6.260 km) business route of US 27 that exists in Nicholasville, Kentucky. It travels through the heart of downtown, while the main route of US 27 travels just west of town.

Major intersections

The entire route is in Nicholasville, Jessamine County.

mi	km	Destinations	Notes
0.000	0.000	US 27	Southern terminus
2.180	3.508	KY 29 south (West Maple Street) / KY 39 south (East Maple Street)	Northern terminus of KY 29; southern terminus of KY 39
2.322	3.737	KY 169 north (West Oak Street) / East Oak Street	South end of KY 169 concurrency
2.380	3.830	KY 169 south (Richmond Avenue)	North end of KY 169 concurrency
3.890	6.260	US 27 (Lexington Road)	Northern terminus
1.000 mi = 1.609 km; 1.000 km = 0.621 mi: Concurrency terminus

=== Cynthiana business loop ===
U.S. Route 27 Business
- Location: Cynthiana, Kentucky
- Length: 2.602 mi (4.188 km)
- Existed: 2014–present

U.S. Route 27 Business (US 27 Bus.) in Cynthiana, Kentucky, runs through the heart of downtown, while the main route of US 27 runs on a bypass alignment just west of town.

=== Cynthiana connector route ===
U.S. Route 27 Connector
- Location: Cynthiana, Kentucky
- Length: 0.135 mi (217 m)

U.S. Route 27 Connector (US 27 Conn.) is a connector route in Cynthiana, Kentucky. It connects US 27 with Kentucky Route 36.

== Kentucky-Ohio ==
=== Newport–Cincinnati city route ===
City U.S. Route 27
- Location: Newport, Kentucky–Cincinnati, Ohio

=== Newport–Cincinnati temporary route ===
Temporary U.S. Route 27
- Location: Newport, Kentucky–Cincinnati, Ohio

== Ohio ==
=== Cincinnati truck route ===
U.S. Route 27 Truck
- Location: Cincinnati, Ohio

=== Fort Wayne truck route ===
U.S. Route 27 Truck
- Location: Fort Wayne, Indiana

== Michigan ==
In addition to the routes above, Michigan had a set of special routes of US 27 that have mostly been renumbered as special routes of different parents. The business route in Charlotte is now numbered as a business route of I-69. Those in Lansing, St. Johns, Ithaca, Alma, St. Louis, Mount Pleasant, Clare, and Harrison have been renumbered as business routes of US 127. Additionally, there was a US 27A that became the Alma business route and a Truck US 27 that became part of the former mainline US 27 through Lansing. The former business route in Marshall was turned over to local control and never renumbered as another highway.

== See also ==
- List of special routes of the United States Numbered Highway System
