= Georgia State Route 97 =

Highway in Georgia

State Route 97
- SR 97; mainline in red, spur route in blue

Route information
- Maintained by GDOT
- Length: 57.2 mi (92.1 km)

Major junctions
- South end: CR 269A at the Florida state line west-southwest of Faceville
- US 27 / US 84 / SR 1 / SR 38 in Bainbridge; SR 309 in Bainbridge; US 84 Bus. / SR 38 Bus. in Bainbridge; US 27 Bus. / SR 1 Bus. in Bainbridge; SR 262 in Vada; SR 112 in Camilla
- North end: SR 37 in Camilla

Location
- Country: United States
- State: Georgia
- Counties: Decatur, Mitchell

Highway system
- Georgia State Highway System; Interstate; US; State; Special
← SR 96	→ SR 98

State Route 97 (SR 97) is a 57.2-mile-long (92.1 km) southwest-to-northeast state highway in the southwestern part of the U.S. state of Georgia. The highway's southern terminus is at the Florida state line, southwest of Faceville, where the roadway continues as County Road 269A to US 90 in Florida. Its northern terminus is at SR 37 in Camilla. The highway connects Faceville with Camilla, via Bainbridge, Vada, and Hopeful.

== Route description ==
=== Decatur County ===
SR 97 begins at the Florida state line, at a point southwest of Faceville, where the roadway continues as County Road 269A (CR 269A) to US 90 in Florida. This is in the southwestern part of Decatur County. The highway travels to the north-northeast and crosses over Boykin Branch. An intersection with Frank Brown Road leads to a wildlife viewing area. Just past the northern terminus of Oaks Road North, the highway curves to the northeast. The highway crosses over North Mosquito Creek and then curves to the east-northeast. Just before an intersection with the southern terminus of Recovery Road, it begins a gradual curve to the east-southeast. After it curves back to the northeast, the highway intersects the southern terminus of SR 97 Spur (Hutchinson Ferry Road). It curves back to the east-northeast, and intersects the southern terminus of Faceville Landing Road, which leads to Faceville Landing. Then, in Faceville, it has an intersection with both the western terminus of SR 302 Spur (Faceville–Attapulgus Road) and the southern terminus of Woodyard Road. The highway then begins a gradual curve to the north-northeast. Then, it meets the northern terminus of SR 302. An intersection with the eastern terminus of Horseshoe Bend Road leads to Horseshoe Bend Park. The highway then crosses over Fourmile Creek. After this, the highway enters Bainbridge.

Just inside the city limits, the highway begins a curve to the northeast. On this curve, there is an intersection with the southern terminus of Old Quincy Highway (formerly the southern terminus of SR 97 Conn.). It then crosses over some railroad tracks of CSX just before a partial interchange with US 27/US 84/SR 1/SR 38. The highway immediately curves to the east and intersects SR 309 (West Street). Here, SR 97 turns left onto SR 309, and the two highways travel concurrently to the north; also, the roadway continues as East Louise Street. Between intersections with the eastern terminus of both West Eva Street and West Barber Street, SR 97 and SR 309 pass the Decatur County Health Department. Six blocks later, they turn right onto US 84 Bus./SR 38 Bus. (Shotwell Street) and follow those highways concurrently to the east. One block later, they meet US 27 Bus./SR 1 Bus. (Broad Street). Here, SR 97 and SR 309 turn left off of US 84 Bus./SR 38 Bus. and onto US 27 Bus./SR 1 Bus. The four highways travel to the north. Two blocks later, at an intersection with Broughton Street, the highways pass the city hall and Willis Park. Six blocks later, US 27 Bus./SR 1 Bus. leave the concurrency on Calhoun Street west, while SR 97 and SR 309 turn right onto Calhoun Street east. The two highways travel to the east. Just east of Independent Street, they curve to the northeast. They cross over another CSX railroad line just before an intersection with the eastern terminus of Back Street. They intersect the southern terminus of SR 311 (East River Road) and curve to the east. A short distance later, they curve back to the northeast.

After leaving Bainbridge, they cross over Big Slough just before splitting. The roadway gradually curves to the north-northeast and then to the north. At the southern terminus of Adolph Brock Road, it curves back to the northeast. The highway intersects SR 262. The two highways begin a brief concurrency. They curve to the north-northeast and enter Vada. There, SR 262 splits off to the east and SR 97 enters the southwestern part of Mitchell County.

=== Mitchell County ===
After leaving Vada, SR 97 curves to the north. It then curves to the north-northeast. In Hopeful, it intersects SR 65. About 2 miles (3.2 km) later, the highway begins to curve to the east-northeast and has an intersection with the northern terminus of SR 311. It travels through Greenwood. It begins to curve to the east and crosses over Big Slough Creek. It begins to curve back to the east-northeast and passes the Camilla–Mitchell County Airport. The highway enters the southwestern part of Camilla. It curves to the east-southeast and intersects SR 112 (Cairo Road). The two highways travel concurrently to the north-northeast. When they split, SR 112 continues to the north-northeast, concurrent with SR 37 Truck, which begins at this intersection, while SR 97 turns left to the north. The highway meets its northern terminus at SR 37. Here, the roadway continues as South Butler Street. On the southeastern corner of this intersection is the City of Camilla Public Safety Complex.

== Major intersections ==
County	Location	mi	km	Destinations	Notes
Decatur		0.0	0.0	CR 269A south to US 90	Southern terminus; northern terminus of CR 269A; continuation of roadway into Florida to US 90
Decatur		6.5	10.5	SR 97 Spur north (Hutchinson Ferry Road) – Wingate's Landing, Lake Seminole	Southern terminus of SR 97 Spur; former SR 310 north
Decatur	Faceville	9.9	15.9	SR 302 Spur east (Faceville–Attapulgus Road) / Woodyard Road north – Quincy, Fla.	Western terminus of SR 302 Spur; southern terminus of Woodyard Road
Decatur	Faceville	11.2	18.0	SR 302 south – Quincy, Fla.	
Decatur	Bainbridge	20.3	32.7	Old Quincy Highway north	Former southern terminus of SR 97 Conn.
Decatur	Bainbridge	21.2– 21.3	34.1– 34.3	US 27 north / US 84 west (SR 1 north / SR 38 west) – Colquitt, Donalsonville, Marina	No access to US 27 south/US 84 east/SR 1 south/SR 38 east from SR 97 or vice versa; interchange
Decatur	Bainbridge	21.5	34.6	SR 309 south (West Street south) / East Louise Street east – Cairo	Southern end of SR 309 concurrency; western terminus of East Louise Street
Decatur	Bainbridge	22.2	35.7	US 84 Bus. west / SR 38 Bus. west (Shotwell Street west) / South West Street north – Donalsonville, Dothan, Ala.	Southern end of US 84 Bus./SR 38 Bus. concurrency
Decatur	Bainbridge	22.2	35.7	US 27 Bus. south / US 84 Bus. east (SR 1 Bus. south / SR 38 Bus. east / Shotwell Street east) / Broad Street south – Southern Regional Technical College	Northern end of US 84 Bus./SR 38 Bus. concurrency; southern end of US 27 Bus./SR 1 Bus. concurrency
Decatur	Bainbridge	22.6	36.4	US 27 Bus. north (SR 1 Bus. north / Calhoun Street west) / Broad Street north to SR 262 – Colquitt, Blakely	Northern end of US 27 Bus./SR 1 Bus. concurrency; US 27 Bus./SR 1 Bus. and SR 97/SR 309 share the Calhoun Street name.
Decatur	Bainbridge	23.3	37.5	SR 311 north (East River Road) – Hopeful, Camilla	
Decatur		26.3	42.3	SR 309 north	Northern end of SR 309 concurrency
Decatur		37.4	60.2	SR 262 south (Pelham Road) – Climax	Southern end of SR 262 concurrency
Decatur–Mitchell county line	Vada	38.5	62.0	SR 262 north – Pelham	Northern end of SR 262 concurrency
Mitchell	Hopeful	45.1	72.6	SR 65 – Bainbridge, Pelham	
Mitchell		46.6	75.0	SR 311 south	Northern terminus of SR 311
Mitchell	Camilla	56.4	90.8	SR 112 south (Cairo Road) – Cairo	Southern end of SR 112 concurrency
Mitchell	Camilla	56.7	91.2	SR 37 Truck north / SR 112 north (South Boulevard Street north) / Butler Street South begins / Cochran Street east	Northern end of SR 112 concurrency; southern terminus of SR 37 Truck
Mitchell	Camilla	57.2	92.1	SR 37 (Broad Street) / South Butler Street north	Northern terminus; South Butler Street continues past northern terminus.
1.000 mi = 1.609 km; 1.000 km = 0.621 mi: Concurrency terminus; Incomplete access

== Special routes ==
=== Bainbridge connector route ===
State Route 97 Connector
- Location: Bainbridge
- Length: 1.6 mi (2.6 km)
- Existed: 2015

State Route 97 Connector (SR 97 Conn.) was a 1.6-mile-long (2.6 km) connector route that began at an intersection with the SR 97 mainline, in the southern part of Bainbridge. It headed northeast, curved to the northwest and curved back to the northeast to meet its northern terminus, an interchange with US 27/US 84/SR 1/SR 38 in the western part of the city. Here, the roadway continues as US 84 Bus./SR 38 Bus. (West Shotwell Street). SR 97 Conn. was decommissioned in 2015

The entire route was in Bainbridge, Decatur County.

mi	km	Destinations	Notes
0.0	0.0	SR 97 – Faceville, Camilla	Southern terminus
1.3– 1.6	2.1– 2.6	US 27 / US 84 (SR 1 / SR 38) / US 84 Bus. east / SR 38 Bus. east (West Shotwell Street) – Donalsonville, Colquitt, Cairo, Havana, Tallahassee	Northern terminus of SR 97 Conn.; western terminus of US 84 Bus./SR 38 Bus.; interchange
1.000 mi = 1.609 km; 1.000 km = 0.621 mi

=== Spur route ===
State Route 97 Spur
- Hutchinson Ferry Road
- Location: West-southwest of Faceville–Shores of Lake Seminole
- Length: 3.4 mi (5.5 km)

State Route 97 Spur (SR 97 Spur) is a 3.4-mile-long (5.5 km) spur route of SR 97 completely within the southwestern part of Decatur County. It begins at an intersection with the SR 97 mainline (Faceville Highway), west-southwest of Faceville. It heads northwest and ends at a barricade, just shy of the shores of Lake Seminole.

The entire route is in Decatur County.

Location	mi	km	Destinations	Notes
	0.0	0.0	SR 97 (Faceville Highway) / Hutchinson Ferry Road south – Chattahoochee Fla, Bainbridge	Southern terminus; Hutchinson Ferry Road continues past southern terminus.
Lake Seminole	3.4	5.5	Northern terminus	
1.000 mi = 1.609 km; 1.000 km = 0.621 mi
