= Georgia State Route 112 =

State highway in Georgia

State Route 112
- Georgia State Route 112 highlighted in red

Route information
- Maintained by GDOT
- Length: 189.84 mi (305.52 km)

Major junctions
- South end: US 84 / SR 38 in Cairo
- US 19 / SR 3 / SR 37 / SR 300 in Camilla; US 82 / SR 33 / SR 520 in Sylvester; I-75 / US 41 / SR 7 / SR 32 in Ashburn; US 280 / SR 30 / SR 215 in Rochelle; US 129 / US 341 / SR 26 / SR 27 in Hawkinsville; I-16 southwest of Allentown; US 80 / SR 19 in Allentown; US 441 / SR 29 in Nicklesville; SR 57 in Toomsboro
- North end: SR 540 south of Milledgeville

Location
- Country: United States
- State: Georgia
- Counties: Grady, Mitchell, Worth, Turner, Wilcox, Pulaski, Bleckley, Twiggs, Wilkinson, Baldwin

Highway system
- Georgia State Highway System; Interstate; US; State; Special
← SR 111	→ SR 113

State Route 112 (SR 112) is a 189.84-mile-long (305.52 km) state highway that travels in a generally southwest-to-northeast orientation in the southwestern and central parts of the U.S. state of Georgia. It passes through portions of Grady, Mitchell, Worth, Turner, Wilcox, Pulaski, Bleckley, Twiggs, Wilkinson, and Baldwin counties, and connects the Cairo and Milledgeville areas of the state.

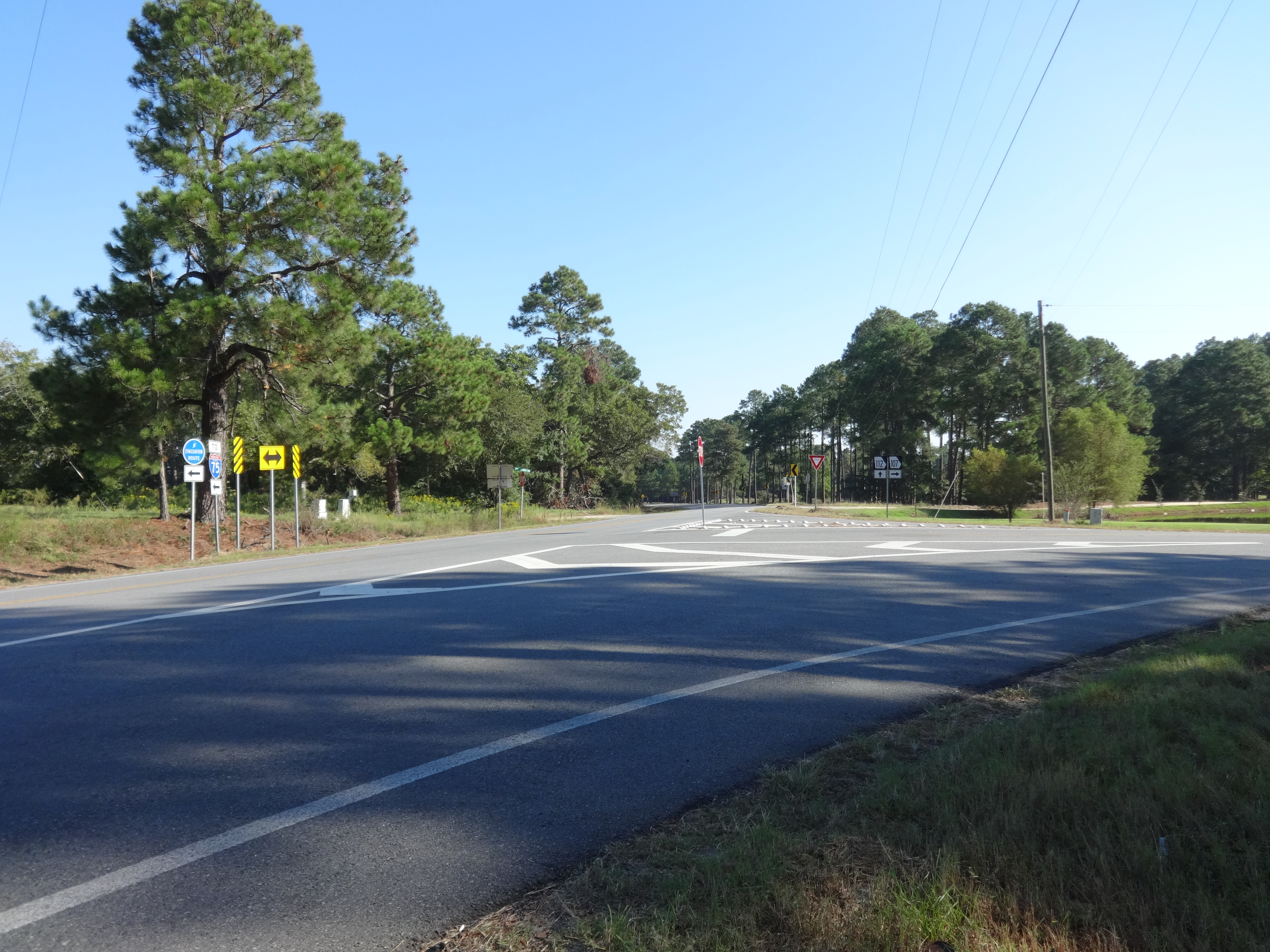
The eastern end of the SR 107 concurrency in Turner County.

== Route description ==
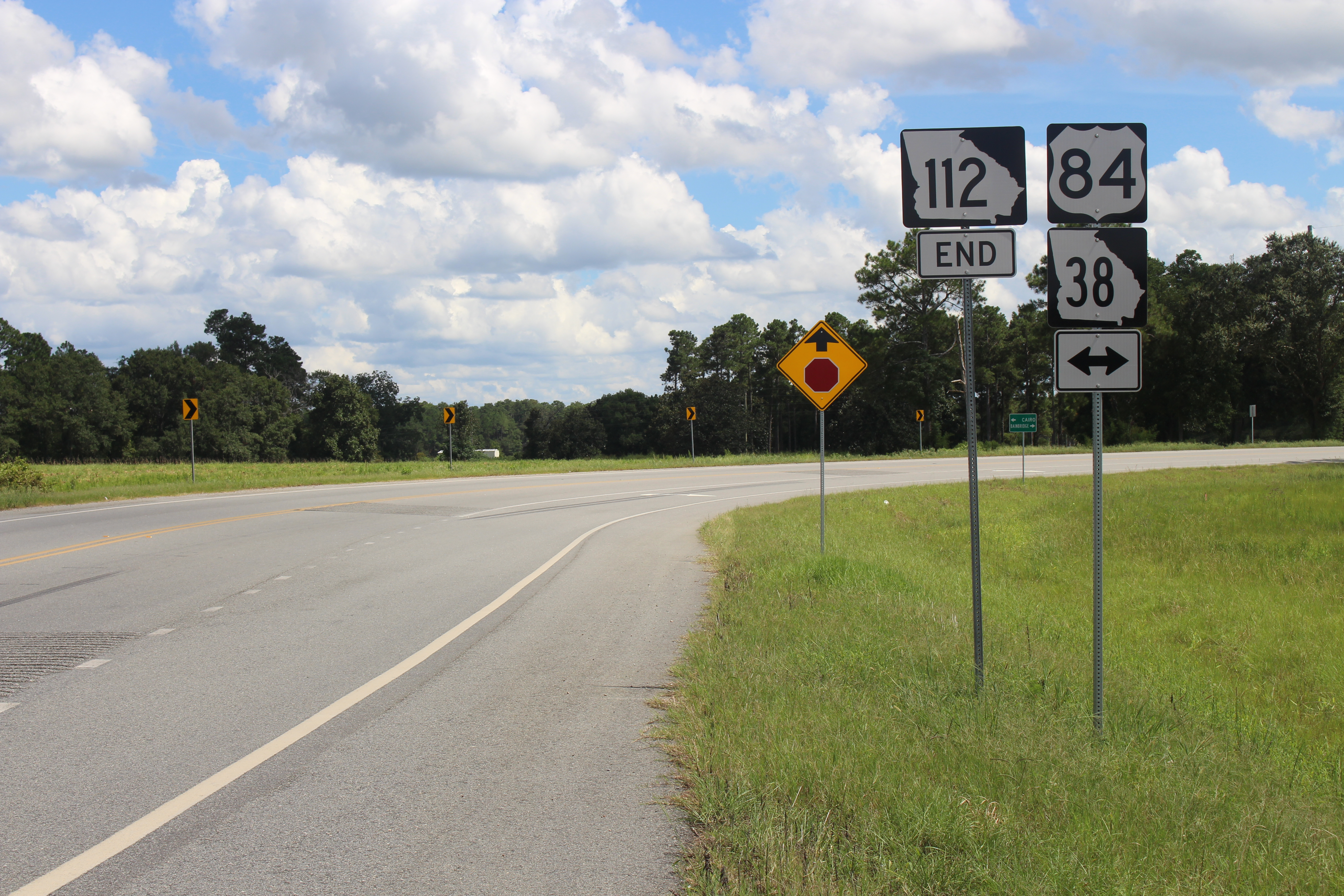
Southern terminus in Cairo

SR 112 begins at an intersection with US 84/SR 38 (Bill Stanfill Highway) in the northern part of Cairo, in Grady County. It heads northwest and curves to the north, until it intersects SR 262 (County Line Road) on the Grady–Mitchell county line. The road curves to the northeast to an intersection with SR 65. The road continues to the northeast, passing the Camilla–Mitchell County Airport, just before entering Camilla. In town, it meets SR 97 (Bainbridge Road), and the two highways run concurrent farther into town. At South Butler Street, SR 97 splits off to the northwest, while SR 37 Truck begins concurrent with SR 112. The concurrent routes meet SR 37 (Newton Road). At West Oakland Avenue they turn to the east. At the intersection with US 19/SR 3/SR 300 (Georgia–Florida Parkway), SR 37 Truck turns to the south, while SR 112 continues to the east. The highway heads northeast and has an extremely brief concurrency with SR 93 in Lester. Shortly afterward, SR 112 crosses into Worth County. A little while after crossing into the county is SR 133. The route continues to the northeast, until it enters Sylvester. In town, it intersects US 82/SR 520 (Franklin Street). The three highways head concurrent to the east for less than 1,000 feet (300 m). At the intersection with SR 33, SR 112 turns to the north with SR 33 for just under 2,000 feet (610 m). SR 112 splits off to the northeast and passes through rural areas until it crosses into Turner County. In Ashburn, it meets SR 32. The two routes run concurrent into the main part of town. There, they intersect US 41/SR 7. At this intersection, SR 32 departs to the south-southeast, while SR 112 continues to the east-northeast. It continues along it routing until it reaches an interchange with Interstate 75 (I-75), just before leaving town. At the east end of the interchange, SR 107 begins concurrent with SR 112. Just over 2 miles (3.2 km) later, SR 107 departs to the northeast into Rebecca. In Rebecca, it meets SR 90 (Ashley Street East). The two routes head concurrent to the northwest for about 0.2 miles (0.32 km). SR 90 splits off to the northwest along North Railroad Street, while SR 112 heads northeast, and then northward, on Sylvester Road. A few miles to the north, the road enters Wilcox County. After the county line, it continue to the north and curves to the northeast. Just before entering Rochelle, it intersects SR 233. The two routes begin a concurrency through town. In the southern part of town, SR 215 (5th Avenue) joins the concurrency. A few blocks later, the concurrent routes meet US 280/SR 30 (1st Avenue). At this intersection, SR 215 departs to the west, while SR 112/SR 233 continue to the north. North of town, the two routes split, with SR 112 heading northwest. It travels through Pineview and into Pulaski County. The road heads northwest and curves to the northeast to an intersection with US 129/SR 11. The concurrent routes head northward into Hawkinsville. In town, they meet SR 27/SR 230/SR 257 (Broad Street). At this intersection, US 129/SR 11 head west, while US 129 Business/SR 11 Business head north and US 129 Alternate joins the concurrency. East of town, US 129 Alternate/SR 112/SR 257 head north, while SR 230 heads south and SR 27 head to the east. Almost immediately is an intersection with US 341/SR 26. Here, SR 26 joins the concurrency, while SR 27 departs to the east, running concurrent with US 341. US 129 Alternate/SR 26/SR 112/SR 257 head northeast for a short distance, until SR 257 leaves the concurrency to the northeast. US 129 Alternate/SR 26/SR 112 head to the northeast and enter Bleckley County. In Cochran, the three highways meet US 23 Business/SR 87 Business (South 2nd Street). At this intersection, SR 26 continues to the northeast on East Dykes Street, while US 23 Business/US 129 Alternate/SR 87 Business/SR 112 head northwest and then curve to the northeast to an intersection with US 23/SR 87. At this intersection, US 23 Business/SR 87 Business end. US 23/US 129 Alternate/SR 87/SR 112 head northwest, until SR 112 splits off to the northeast. It has an interchange with I-16. Almost immediately, the road crosses the extreme southeastern corner of Twiggs County and enters Allentown. The Twiggs–Wilkinson county line runs through the town's limits Farther into town is US 80/SR 19. The highway passes through rural areas of the county to an intersection with US 441/SR 29 in Nicklesville. The road curves to the north, to meet SR 57 (Irwinton Road) in Toomsboro. Then, it curves to the northwest, to enter Baldwin County. SR 112 continues to the northwest and meets its northern terminus at an intersection with SR 540.

There are two sections of SR 112 that are part of the National Highway System, a system of roadways important to the nation's economy, defense, and mobility.

- The section concurrent with SR 32 in Ashburn
- The section concurrent with US 129 Alternate between Hawkinsville and Cochran

== History ==
Before the Fall Line Freeway (SR 540) was built, SR 112 continued north to Milledgeville and had its northern terminus at an intersection of SR 22/SR 24 and the northern terminus of SR 49 (North Elbert Street / East Hancock Street). After the Fall Line Freeway (SR 540) was built and open to traffic in 2018, SR 112 was truncated and had its new northern terminus at an intersection of SR 540 (Fall Line Freeway).

== Major intersections ==
County	Location	mi	km	Destinations	Notes
Grady	Cairo	0.0	0.0	US 84 / SR 38 (Bill Stanfill Highway)	Southern terminus
Grady–Mitchell county line		12.9	20.8	SR 262 (County Line Road) – Vada, Pelham	
Mitchell		17.2	27.7	SR 65 – Hopeful, Pelham	
Mitchell	Camilla	23.0	37.0	SR 97 south (Bainbridge Road) – Bainbridge	Southern end of SR 97 concurrency
Mitchell	Camilla	23.4	37.7	SR 37 Truck (South Butler Street) / SR 97 north	Northern end of SR 97 concurrency; southern end of SR 37 Truck concurrency; southern terminus of SR 37 Truck
Mitchell	Camilla	23.9	38.5	SR 37 / Dixie Highway south (East Broad Street) – Newton, Moultrie	Southern end of Dixie Highway Scenic Byway concurrency
Mitchell	Camilla	24.0	38.6	Dixie Highway north (Scott Street)	Northern end of Dixie Highway Scenic Byway concurrency
Mitchell	Camilla	24.6	39.6	US 19 / SR 3 / SR 300 / SR 37 Truck south	Northern end of SR 37 Truck concurrency
Mitchell	Lester	37.9	61.0	SR 93 west – Baconton	Southern end of SR 93 concurrency
Mitchell		38.3	61.6	SR 93 east – Sale City	Northern end of SR 93 concurrency
Worth		45.1	72.6	SR 133 (Moultrie Road) – Moultrie, Albany	
Worth	Sylvester	55.8	89.8	US 82 west / SR 520 west	Southern end of US 82/SR 520 concurrency
Worth	Sylvester	55.9	90.0	SR 33 south (North Main Street) – Moultrie	Northern end of US 82/SR 520 concurrency; southern end of SR 33 concurrency
Worth	Sylvester	56.3	90.6	SR 33 north (Cordele Road) – Cordele	Northern end of SR 33 concurrency
Turner	Ashburn	72.0	115.9	SR 32 west – Leesburg	Southern end of SR 32 concurrency
Turner	Ashburn	72.8	117.2	US 41 / SR 7 / SR 32 east	Northern end of SR 32 concurrency
Turner	Ashburn	73.8	118.8	I-75 (SR 401) / SR 107 – Valdosta, Macon	Southern end of SR 107 concurrency; western terminus of SR 107; I-75 exit 82
Turner		77.1	124.1	SR 107 east – Fitzgerald	Northern end of SR 107 concurrency
Turner	Rebecca	85.3	137.3	SR 90 east (Ashley Street East) – Fitzgerald	Southern end of SR 90 concurrency
Turner	Rebecca	85.5	137.6	SR 90 west (North Railroad Street) – Cordele	Northern end of SR 90 concurrency
Wilcox		95.1	153.0	SR 233 south	Southern end of SR 233 concurrency
Wilcox	Rochelle	95.8	154.2	SR 215 south (5th Avenue) – Fitzgerald	Southern end of SR 215 concurrency
Wilcox	Rochelle	96.1	154.7	US 280 / SR 30 / SR 215 north	Northern end of SR 215 concurrency
Wilcox		97.9	157.6	SR 233 north	Northern end of SR 233 concurrency
Pulaski		117	188	US 129 south / SR 11 south (Abbeville Highway)	Southern end of US 129/SR 11 concurrency
Pulaski	Hawkinsville	121	195	US 341 north / SR 27 south / SR 230 west / SR 257 west (Broad Street) / US 129 north / SR 11 north (Broad Street) / US 129 Bus. north / SR 11 Bus. north (Jackson Street South) / US 129 Alt.	Northern end of US 129/SR 11 concurrency; southern end of US 129 Alt./US 341/SR 27/SR 230/SR 257 concurrency; southern terminus of US 129 Bus./SR 11 Bus.
Pulaski	Hartford	122	196	US 341 south / SR 27 south (Golden Isles Connector) / SR 230 (Lower River Road)	Northern end of US 341/SR 27 and SR 230 concurrencies
Bleckley	Cochran	131	211	US 23 Bus. south / SR 87 Bus. south (South 2nd Street) / SR 26 east (East Dykes Street)	Northern end of SR 26 concurrency; southern end of US 23 Bus./SR 87 Bus. concurrency
Bleckley	Cochran	134	216	US 23 south / US 23 Bus. / SR 87 south / SR 87 Bus.	Northern end of US 23 Bus./SR 87 Bus. concurrency; southern end of US 23/SR 87 concurrency
Bleckley	Royal	136	219	US 23 north / US 129 Alt. north / SR 87 north (Golden Isles Highway)	Northern end of US 23/US 129 Alt./SR 87 concurrency
Bleckley		148	238	I-16 (Jim Gillis Historic Savannah Parkway / SR 404) – Macon, Savannah	I-16 exit 32
Twiggs	No major junctions				
Wilkinson	Allentown	150	240	US 80 / SR 19	
Wilkinson	Nicklesville	161	259	US 441 / SR 29 – Milledgeville, Dublin	
Wilkinson	Toomsboro	172	277	SR 57 (Irwinton Road) – Irwinton, Wrightsville	
Baldwin		189.84	305.52	SR 540 (Fall Line Freeway) – Macon, Augusta	Northern terminus
1.000 mi = 1.609 km; 1.000 km = 0.621 mi

== Milledgeville spur route ==
State Route 112 Spur
- Location: Milledgeville
- Length: 0.3 mi (480 m)
- Existed: 1960–1989

State Route 112 Spur (SR 112 Spur) was a spur route of SR 112 that existed entirely within the east-central part of Milledgeville. It was known as Vinson Highway for its entire length.

It began at an intersection with the SR 112 mainline. It curved to the left and met its northern terminus, an intersection with US 441 Bus./SR 243 (South Wayne Street).

The roadway that would eventually become SR 112 Spur was established between January 1945 and November 1946, as SR 29 Spur on the northern part of Vinson Highway, from the southern part of Vinson Highway in the southeastern part of the city north-northwest and northwest to US 441/SR 29 (Wayne Street) in the southern part of the city. Between July 1957 and June 1960, it was redesignated as SR 112 Spur. The southern part of Vinson Highway was designated as part of SR 112. In 1989, this highway was decommissioned.

The entire route was in Milledgeville, Baldwin County.

mi	km	Destinations	Notes
0.0	0.0	SR 112 (Vinson Highway south/South Elbert Street north) – Toomsboro	Southern terminus
0.3	0.48	US 441 Bus. / SR 243 (South Wayne Street) – Scottsboro	Northern terminus
1.000 mi = 1.609 km; 1.000 km = 0.621 mi
