= Georgia State Route 311 =

Highway in Georgia, United States

State Route 311
- SR 311 highlighted in red

Route information
- Maintained by GDOT
- Length: 23.9 mi (38.5 km)

Major junctions
- South end: SR 97 / SR 309 in Bainbridge
- SR 65 west of Hopeful
- North end: SR 97 northeast of Hopeful

Location
- Country: United States
- State: Georgia
- Counties: Decatur, Mitchell

Highway system
- Georgia State Highway System; Interstate; US; State; Special
← SR 310	→ SR 312

State Route 311 (SR 311) is a north-south state highway located in the southwest part of the U.S. state of Georgia.

== Route description ==
SR 311 begins at an intersection with SR 97/SR 309 in Bainbridge. The route heads northeast through rural parts of Decatur County before entering Mitchell County. Farther to the northeast, SR 311 intersects SR 65 west of Hopeful. SR 311 curves around Hopeful until it meets its northern terminus, an intersection with SR 97 just northeast of Hopeful.

== Major intersections ==
County	Location	mi	km	Destinations	Notes
Decatur	Bainbridge	0.0	0.0	SR 97 / SR 309 (Albany Road)	Southern terminus
Mitchell		20.3	32.7	SR 65 – Hopeful, Pelham	
Mitchell		23.9	38.5	SR 97 – Hopeful, Vada	Northern terminus
1.000 mi = 1.609 km; 1.000 km = 0.621 mi
