= Georgia State Route 65 =

State highway in Georgia, United States

State Route 65
- SR 65 highlighted in red

Route information
- Maintained by GDOT
- Length: 17.0 mi (27.4 km)

Major junctions
- West end: SR 311 west of Hopeful
- SR 97 in Hopeful; SR 112 south-southwest of Camilla
- East end: SR 93 in Pelham

Location
- Country: United States
- State: Georgia
- Counties: Mitchell

Highway system
- Georgia State Highway System; Interstate; US; State; Special
← SR 64	→ SR 66

State Route 65 (SR 65) is a 17.0-mile-long (27.4 km) state highway located entirely in the southwestern part of Mitchell County in the southwestern part of the U.S. state of Georgia. It connects the Hopeful and Pelham areas of the state.

== Route description ==
SR 65 begins at an intersection with SR 311, west of Hopeful. It heads southeast and curves to the east toward Pelham. The route has an intersection with SR 97 in Hopeful. The highway travels east-southeast through rural portions of the county and passes through the town of Branchville. It has an intersection with SR 112 before reaching Pelham. Once in Pelham, the route gradually bends to the east-southeast, until it meets its eastern terminus, an intersection with SR 93.

== Major intersections ==
The entire route is in Mitchell County.

Location	mi	km	Destinations	Notes
	0.0	0.0	SR 311 – Bainbridge, Camilla	Western terminus
Hopeful	2.4	3.9	SR 97 – Bainbridge, Camilla	
	11.8	19.0	SR 112 – Cairo, Camilla	
Pelham	17.0	27.4	SR 93 (Church Street south / Hand Avenue east) – Cairo, Tallahassee, Pelham	Eastern terminus
1.000 mi = 1.609 km; 1.000 km = 0.621 mi
