= Special routes of U.S. Route 84 =

U.S. Route 84

Location
- Country: United States

Highway system
- United States Numbered Highway System; List; Special; Divided

At least 13 special routes of U.S. Route 84 have existed.

== Texas ==
=== Lubbock business route ===
Business U.S. Highway 84-D
- Location: Lubbock, Texas
- Length: 36.000 mi (57.936 km)
- Existed: 2020–present

Business U.S. Route 84-D is a business route of US 84 that travels through Lubbock. It begins at the intersection of US 84 and FM 2641 and runs southeast to the intersection of US 84 and County Road 9657, following the former routing of US 84, which is planned to be rerouted along Loop 88.

=== Slaton business loop ===
Business U.S. Highway 84-E
- Location: Slaton, Texas
- Length: 3.933 mi (6.330 km)
- Existed: 1990–present

Business U.S. Route 84-E (Bus. US 84-E) is a business route of US 84 that travels through Slaton. The highway is concurrent with FM 400 for most of its length.

The highway was previously designated as Loop 251 from 1965 to 1991.

Junction list

The entire route is in Slaton, Lubbock County.

mi	km	Destinations	Notes
0.0	0.0	US 84 west	Interchange; westbound exit and eastbound entrance
0.8	1.3	FM 400 north – Plainview, Slaton Municipal Airport	West end of FM 400 overlap
2.5	4.0	FM 41 west (West Division Street)	
3.3	5.3	To FM 2150 / Borden Street	
3.5	5.6	US 84 / FM 400 south	Interchange; east end of FM 400 overlap
1.000 mi = 1.609 km; 1.000 km = 0.621 mi: Concurrency terminus; Incomplete access

=== Snyder business loop ===
Business U.S. Highway 84-G
- Location: Snyder, Texas
- Length: 7.751 mi (12.474 km)
- Existed: 1990–present

Business U.S. Route 84-G (Bus. US 84-G) is a business route of US 84 that travels through the town of Snyder.

Bus. US 84-G begins at an interchange with US 84 / FM 1611 northwest of the town. The highway travels in a southeastern direction through rural farming areas before entering the Snyder city limits near an intersection with Huffman Avenue. In Snyder, Bus. US 84-G travels along Lubbock Highway through an industrial area of the town then begins an overlap with SH 208 near 13th Street. The two highways travel in a southern direction along College Avenue then turn east at US 180 / SH 350 at the town square, beginning an overlap with the former. Bus. US 84-G travels east along 25th Street with US 180 / SH 208, with the roadway turning southeast near Avenue H onto Coliseum Drive. The business route leaves the overlap with US 180 and SH 208 in southeastern Snyder and leaves the city limits before ending at an interchange with US 84.

The highway was previously designated as Loop 401 from 1964 to 1990.

Major intersections

The entire route is in Terry County.

Location	mi	km	Destinations	Notes
	0.0	0.0	US 84 / FM 1611	Interchange; western terminus
Snyder	5.2	8.4	SH 208 north (College Avenue) / 13th Street – Clairemont, Post	West end of SH 208 overlap
Snyder	6.0	9.7	US 180 west (25th Street) / SH 350 west (College Avenue)	West end of US 180 overlap
Snyder	8.4	13.5	FM 1605 west	Access to Cogdell Memorial Hospital
Snyder	8.7	14.0	US 180 east – Lubbock, Roby, Post	East end of US 180 overlap
Snyder	8.8	14.2	SH 208 south – Colorado City	East end of SH 208 overlap
	10.5	16.9	US 84	Interchange; eastern terminus
1.000 mi = 1.609 km; 1.000 km = 0.621 mi: Concurrency terminus

=== Hermleigh business loop ===
Business U.S. Highway 84-H
- Location: Hermleigh, Texas
- Length: 3.035 mi (4.884 km)
- Existed: 1990–present

=== Roscoe business loop ===
Business U.S. Highway 84-J
- Location: Roscoe, Texas
- Length: 2.24 mi (3.60 km)
- Existed: 1990–present

Business U.S. Highway 84-J (Bus. US 84-J) is a business route of US 84 in Roscoe, Texas that is 2.4 miles (3.9 km) long. It starts at US 84 outside of Roscoe and starts heading towards the center of town. Near the center of town, it starts running concurrently with Farm to Market Road 608, and in the center of town, they intersect Business IH 20-L. The route then stops running concurrently with FM 608 and ends at US 84.

==== Major intersections ====
The entire route is in Nolan County.

Location	mi	km	Destinations	Notes
	0.0	0.0	US 84	Western terminus
Roscoe	0.9	1.4	FM 608 north	Western end of concurrency with FM 608
Roscoe	1.0	1.6	I-20 BS west (Broadway Street) – Colorado City	Eastern terminus of I-20 Bus.
Roscoe	1.1	1.8	FM 608 south (Main Street)	Eastern end of concurrency with FM 608
	2.4	3.9	US 84 – Abilene	Eastern terminus
1.000 mi = 1.609 km; 1.000 km = 0.621 mi: Concurrency terminus

=== Teague business loop ===
Business U.S. Highway 84-R
- Location: Teague, Texas
- Length: 2.097 mi (3.375 km)
- Existed: 1990–present

== Mississippi ==
=== Natchez business loop ===
U.S. Highway 84 Business
- Location: Natchez, Mississippi

== Alabama ==
=== Enterprise business loop ===
U.S. Route 84 Business
- Location: Enterprise, Alabama

=== Dothan business loop ===
U.S. Route 84 Business
- Location: Dothan, Alabama

== Georgia ==
=== Bainbridge business loop ===
U.S. Highway 84 Business
- Location: Bainbridge, Georgia
- Length: 2.8 mi (4.5 km)

U.S. Route 84 Business (US 84 Bus.) in Bainbridge follows the former routing of US 84/SR 38 through downtown, traveling west to east from both ends of the mainline route around the city. It is entirely concurrent with SR 38 Bus. The business route is known as Shotwell Street for its entire length.

US 84 Bus. and SR 38 Bus. begin at an interchange with US 27/US 84/SR 1/SR 38 in the central part of the city. At this interchange, the road continues as South Old Quincy Road, which is former SR 97 Conn. There is also Boat Basin Circle, which is the main entrance to Earle May Recreation Area. They travel to the east and cross over some railroad tracks of CSX. They intersect South Bruton Street, which leads to Cheney Griffin Park. At West Street, SR 97/SR 309 join the concurrency. One block later, at Broad Street, SR 97/SR 309 depart the concurrency, and US 27 Bus./SR 1 Bus. join. On the southeastern corner of the intersection with Monroe Street lies the Gilbert H. Gragg Library. At Scott Street, US 27 Bus./SR 1 Bus. leave the concurrency. Between North Thornatiska Drive and South Wheat Avenue, they pass Jones Wheat Elementary School. Between South Wheat Avenue and Gordon Avenue, they pass Memorial Hospital and Manor. Just to the east of Gordon Avenue, the highways curve to the east-southeast before meeting their eastern terminus, an intersection with US 84/SR 38 (Thomasville Road).

The entire route is in Bainbridge, Decatur County.

mi	km	Destinations	Notes
0.0– 0.3	0.0– 0.48	US 27 / US 84 (SR 1 / SR 38) / South Old Quincy Road south / Boat Basin Circle west – Colquitt, Donalsonville, Cairo, Havana, Tallahassee	Western end of SR 38 Bus. concurrency; western terminus of US 84 Bus. and SR 38 Bus.; northern terminus of South Old Quincy Road; eastern terminus of Boat Basin Circle; interchange; South Old Quincy Road is former SR 97 Conn. south.
0.8	1.3	SR 97 south / SR 309 south (West Street) – Chattahoochee, Havana, Fla.	Western end of SR 97/SR 309 concurrency
0.8	1.3	US 27 Bus. north / SR 97 north / SR 309 north (SR 1 Bus. north / Broad Street)	Eastern end of SR 97/SR 309 concurrency; western end of US 27 Bus./SR 1 Bus. concurrency
1.3	2.1	US 27 Bus. south (SR 1 Bus. south / Scott Street) – Attapulgus, Tallahassee	Eastern end of US 27 Bus./SR 1 Bus. concurrency
2.8– 2.8	4.5– 4.5	US 84 (SR 38 / Thomasville Road) / SR 38 Bus. – Donalsonville, Cairo, Climax, Dothan, Ala., Quincy, Seminole State Park	Eastern end of SR 38 Bus. concurrency; eastern terminus of US 84 Bus. and SR 38 Bus.
1.000 mi = 1.609 km; 1.000 km = 0.621 mi: Concurrency terminus

=== Thomasville business loop ===
U.S. Highway 84 Business
- Location: Thomasville, Georgia
- Length: 4.9 mi (7.9 km)

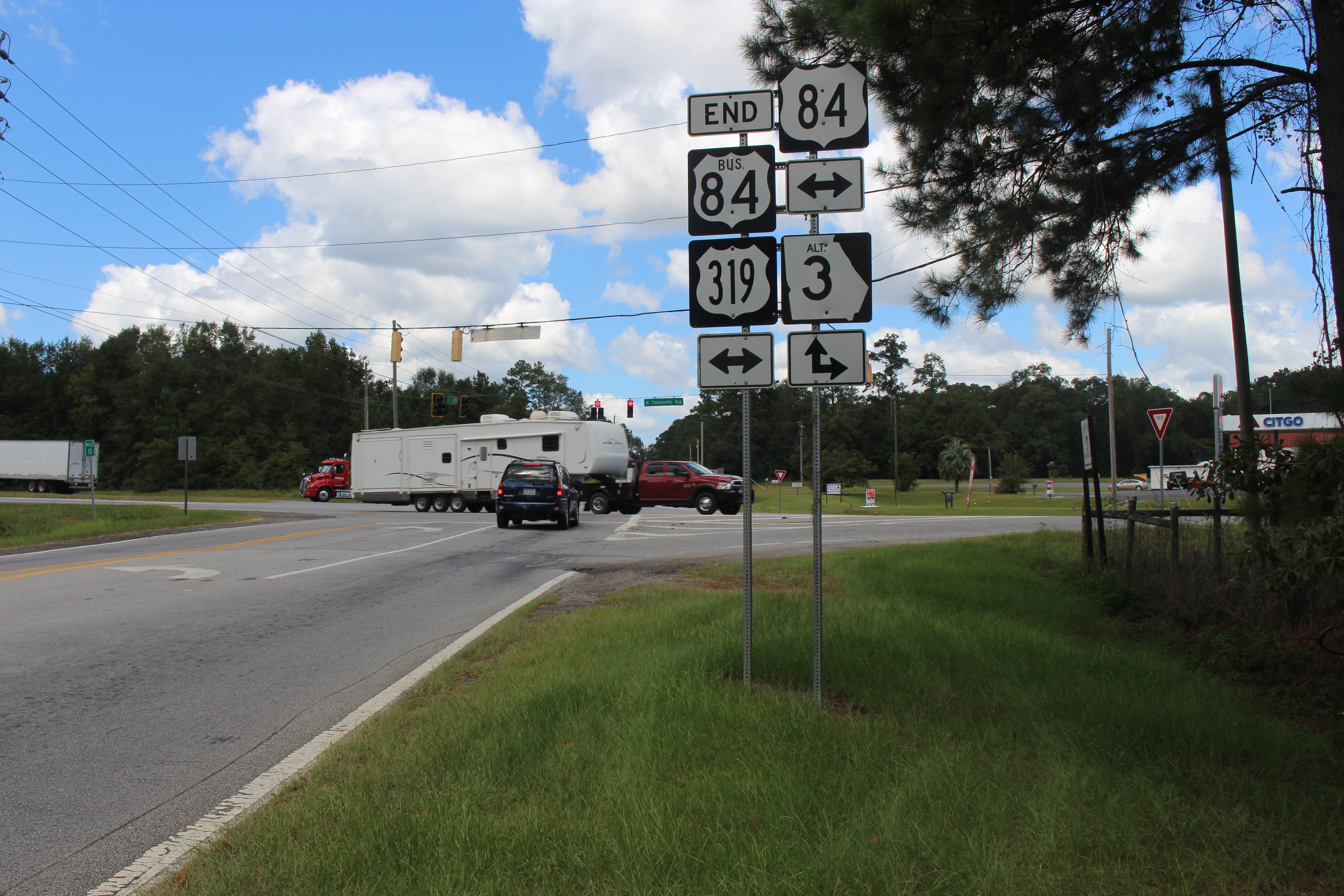
Northern terminus of US 84 Bus. north of Thomasville

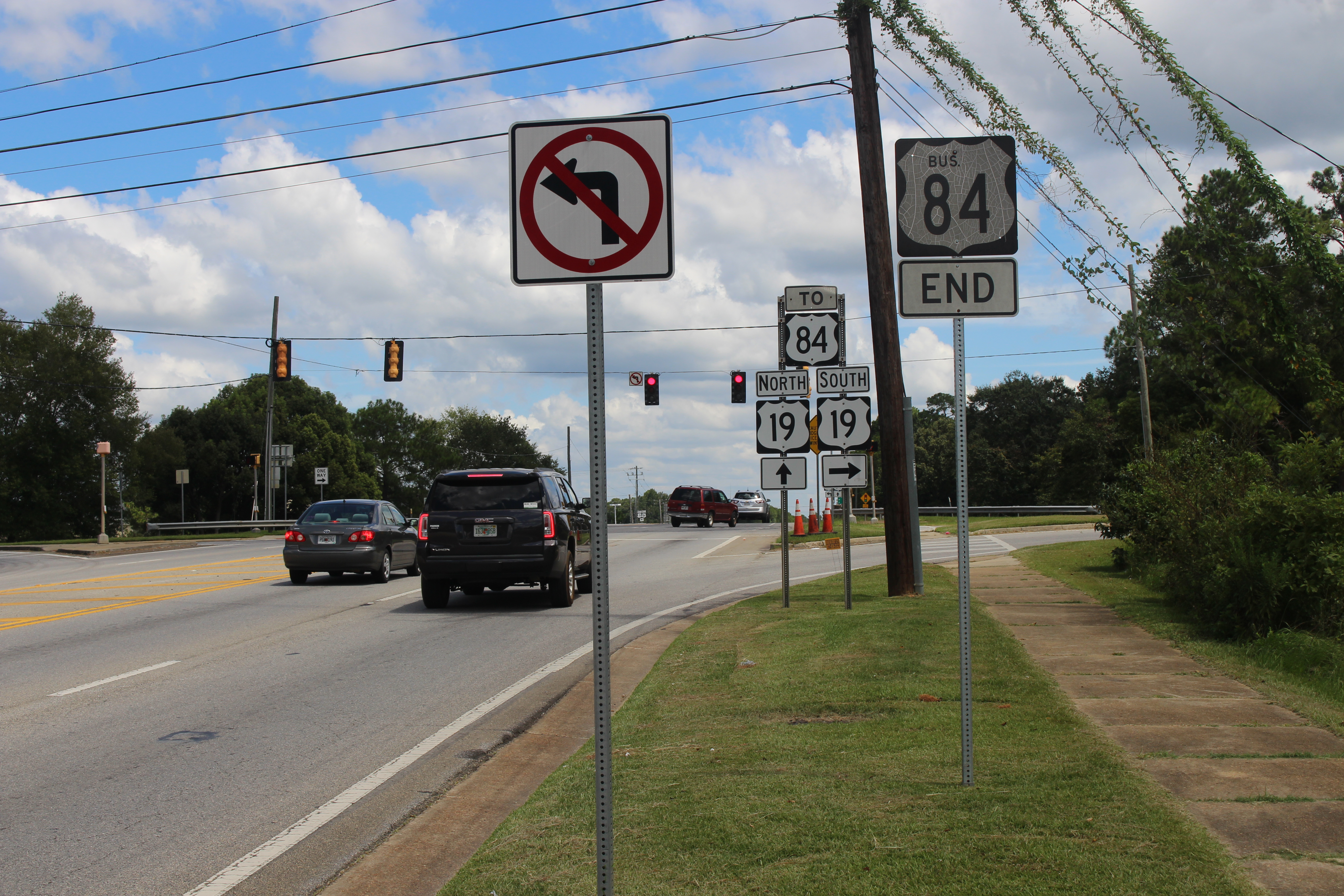
Eastern terminus of US 84 Bus. east of Thomasville

U.S. Route 84 Business (US 84 Bus. is a 4.9-mile-long (7.9 km) business route of US 84 that mostly exists within the city limits of Thomasville. It follows the former routing of US 84/SR 38 through the city. It is entirely concurrent with SR 38 Bus. and travels near the Lapham–Patterson House State Historic Site. Both ends of the highway are just outside of the city limits of Thomasville.

US 84 Bus. and SR 38 Bus. begin at an intersection with US 84/US 319/SR 35/SR 38 just north-northwest of the city limits. Here, the roadway continues as SR 3 Alternate (SR 3 Alt.). They travel to the south-southeast, with the local name of Old Albany Road, through rural areas, and enter the city. Just before intersecting the eastern terminus of Plantation Oak Drive, they begin a very gradual curve to a nearly due-south direction. The highway becomes increasingly more residential. Just before intersecting the western terminus of Meadow Street, they curve back to the south-southeast. They curve to the southeast and take on the North Boulevard name. North Boulevard splits off to the east, while US 84 Bus./SR 38 Bus. curve to the southeast, onto Madison Street. Between Crystal Street and Walcott Street, they travel on a bridge over some railroad tracks of CSX and Merrill Street. They then enter the main part of the city. An intersection with Calhoun Street leads to the Jack Hadley Black History Museum. On the western side of the intersection with Washington Street lies the Thomas County Judicial Center. They intersect Jackson Street, which is the former path of US 319 Bus./SR 35 Bus. The two highways turn left onto Smith Avenue and take it to the northeast. At the intersection with Broad Street, which is the former path of US 19 Bus., they curve to the east. Just east of Cherokee Street, they cross over some railroad tracks of CSX. At the northern terminus of Susie Way, they pass a complex that contains courts, magistrate, jail, police department, and sheriff's office. Between Susie Way and the southern terminus of Covington Avenue, they pass to the south of Cherokee Lake. Covington Avenue leads to the Thomasville Rose Garden.

The entire route is in Thomas County.

Location	mi	km	Destinations	Notes
	0.0	0.0	US 84 / US 319 / SR 35 / SR 38 (North Thomasville Bypass) / SR 3 Alt. / Dixie Highway north to US 19 – Cairo, Meigs, Cairo, Quitman	Western end of SR 38 Bus. and Dixie Highway Scenic Byway concurrency; western terminus of US 84 Bus. and SR 38 Bus.
Thomasville	2.6	4.2	Dixie Highway south (Jackson Street)	Former US 319 Bus./SR 35 Bus.; eastern end of Dixie Highway Scenic Byway concurrency
Thomasville	2.8	4.5	Broad Street	Former US 19 Bus.
	4.8– 4.9	7.7– 7.9	US 19 / SR 3 / SR 300 (Georgia–Florida Parkway) / US 84 / SR 38 (Wiregrass Georgia Parkway) – Monticello, Meigs, Cairo, Quitman, Boston	Eastern end of SR 38 Bus. concurrency; eastern terminus of US 84 Bus. and SR 38 Bus.; interchange
1.000 mi = 1.609 km; 1.000 km = 0.621 mi: Concurrency terminus
