= Georgia State Route 310 =

Highway in Georgia, United States

State Route 310
- SR 310 highlighted in red

Route information
- Maintained by GDOT
- Length: 21.7 mi (34.9 km)

Major junctions
- South end: SR 253 east of Reynoldsville
- US 84 / SR 38 in Brinson
- North end: US 27 / SR 1 / SR 45 Conn. in Colquitt

Location
- Country: United States
- State: Georgia
- Counties: Decatur, Miller

Highway system
- Georgia State Highway System; Interstate; US; State; Special
← SR 309	→ SR 311

State Route 310 (SR 310) is a 21.7-mile-long (34.9 km) south–north state highway located in the southwestern part of the U.S. state of Georgia. It connects Reynoldsville with Colquitt.

== Route description ==
SR 310 begins at an intersection with SR 253 east of Reynoldsville. The route heads due north to the town of Brinson. There, it intersects US 84/SR 38. After Brinson, the route curves northeast, and then northwest, to meet its northern terminus, an intersection with US 27/SR 1 in Colquitt. The roadway continues as SR 45 Connector (South 1st Street).

== History ==
Considering that, only a year after the highway was commissioned, the Miller County section of the highway was decommissioned, leaving the Brinson section of SR 310 as a double spur in Decatur County, ending at the Miller County line to the north and Lake Seminole to the south with the other section of the highway across the lake. In 1965, a new route was constructed in Miller County, extending from the SR 310 stub end north to Colquitt. However, oddly enough, this road did not become part of SR 310 for more than two decades to come. In fact, the extension to Colquitt was not completed until the early 1990s. Perhaps the consideration of decommissioning the highway was so strong that no action was taken for all that time.

When the Miller County section was commissioned, SR 310 was at maximum length, extending nearly 33 miles (53 km). This all changed, however, in 1995. That year, the 5.8-mile (9.3 km) dead end Yates Spring Road section south of SR 253 to Lake Seminole was decommissioned and the 3.5-mile (5.6 km) portion of the highway on the other side of the lake was changed to SR 97 Spur.

The northern terminus of the highway was relocated within Colquitt to Grow Street instead of connecting to US 27 in downtown. That portion is now SR 45 Connector.

== Major intersections ==
County	Location	mi	km	Destinations	Notes
Decatur		0.0	0.0	SR 253 (Bainbridge Highway) – Reynoldsville, Bainbridge	Southern terminus
Decatur	Brinson	7.2	11.6	US 84 east / SR 38 east (Dothan Road) – Bainbridge	
Decatur	Brinson	7.2	11.6	US 84 west / SR 38 west (Dothan Road) – Donalsonville	
Miller	Colquitt	21.7	34.9	US 27 / SR 1 (Crawford Street) / SR 45 Conn. north (South 1st Street)	Northern terminus
1.000 mi = 1.609 km; 1.000 km = 0.621 mi
