= Georgia State Route 302 =

Highway in Georgia, United States

State Route 302
- Cool Springs Road
- SR 302 highlighted in red

Route information
- Maintained by GDOT
- Length: 4.6 mi (7.4 km)

Major junctions
- South end: SR 267 at the Florida state line in southern Decatur County
- North end: SR 97 northeast of Faceville

Location
- Country: United States
- State: Georgia
- Counties: Decatur

Highway system
- Georgia State Highway System; Interstate; US; State; Special
← SR 301	→ SR 303

State Route 302 (SR 302) is a south-north state highway located in the southwestern part of the U.S. state of Georgia. Its route, approximately 4.6 miles (7.4 km), runs entirely within Decatur County.

== Route description ==
SR 302 begins at the Florida state line, where the roadway continues as State Road 267. It heads north, intersecting Bettstown Road and SR 302 Spur (Faceville Attapulgus Road) before reaching its northern terminus, an intersection with SR 97.

== Major intersections ==
The entire route is in Decatur County.

Location	mi	km	Destinations	Notes
	0.0	0.0	SR 267 south – Quincy	Continuation beyond Florida state line
	3.1	5.0	SR 302 Spur west (Faceville–Attapulgus Road) – Faceville, Chattahoochee	
	4.6	7.4	SR 97 (Faceville Highway) – Bainbridge, Chattahoochee	
1.000 mi = 1.609 km; 1.000 km = 0.621 mi

== Related route ==
State Route 302 Spur
- Location: Rural Decatur County-Faceville
- Length: 1.1 mi (1.8 km)

State Route 302 Spur (SR 302 Spur) is a 1.1-mile (1.8 km) spur route that begins at an intersection with the SR 302 mainline, southeast of Faceville. It heads northwest until it meets its northern terminus, at an intersection with SR 97 in Faceville.
