= Springdale Lake =

Reservoir in Georgia, US

- Location within Georgia
- Location: Polk County, Georgia
- Coordinates: 34°01′45″N 85°15′15″W
- Type: reservoir

Springdale Lake is a reservoir in Polk County, in the U.S. state of Georgia.

Springdale Lake was built in the mid-20th century as the central feature of a planned community.

== See also ==
- List of lakes in Georgia (U.S. state)
