= Faceville, Georgia =

- Unincorporated community Census-designated place
- Location within Georgia
- Coordinates: 30°45′12″N 84°38′24″W
- Country: United States
- State: Georgia
- County: Decatur
- Elevation: 305 ft (93 m)

Population (2020)
  - Total: 136
- Time zone: UTC-5 (Eastern (EST))
  - Summer (DST): UTC-4 (EDT)
- ZIP code: 39819
- Area code: 229
- GNIS feature ID: 314022

Faceville is an unincorporated community and census-designated place in Decatur County, Georgia, United States. It first appeared as a CDP in the 2020 Census with a population of 136. It is part of the Bainbridge, Georgia Micropolitan Statistical Area. Faceville is located at the junction of Georgia State Route 97 and Georgia State Route 302 Spur, 11 miles (18 km) south-southwest of Bainbridge.

== Demographics ==
Historical population
| Census | Pop. | Note | %± |
|---|---|---|---|
| 2020 | 136 | | — |
U.S. Decennial Census; 2020

Faceville was first listed as a census designated place in the 2020 U.S. census.

=== 2020 census ===
Faceville CDP, Georgia – Racial and ethnic composition Note: the US Census treats Hispanic/Latino as an ethnic category. This table excludes Latinos from the racial categories and assigns them to a separate category. Hispanics/Latinos may be of any race.
| Race / Ethnicity (NH = Non-Hispanic) | Pop 2020 | % 2020 |
|---|---|---|
| White alone (NH) | 89 | 65.44% |
| Black or African American alone (NH) | 17 | 12.50% |
| Native American or Alaska Native alone (NH) | 0 | 0.00% |
| Asian alone (NH) | 0 | 0.00% |
| Pacific Islander alone (NH) | 0 | 0.00% |
| Some Other Race alone (NH) | 1 | 0.74% |
| Mixed Race or Multi-Racial (NH) | 0 | 0.00% |
| Hispanic or Latino (any race) | 29 | 21.32% |
| Total | 136 | 100.00% |

== Notable person ==
- Jack Thomas Brinkley, U.S. Representative from Georgia from 1967 to 1983

== Notable Person ==
Calvin "Jack" Wingate (1929-2011) The Sage of Seminole Owner/Operator Wingates Lunker Lodge,1958-2001; BASS Hall of Fame; Freshwater Fishing Hall of Fame; Legends of the Outdoors Hall of Fame; Georgia Outdoor Writers Hall of Fame Pioneer Award for Tourism in Decatur County, GA
