= Pelham, Georgia =

- City
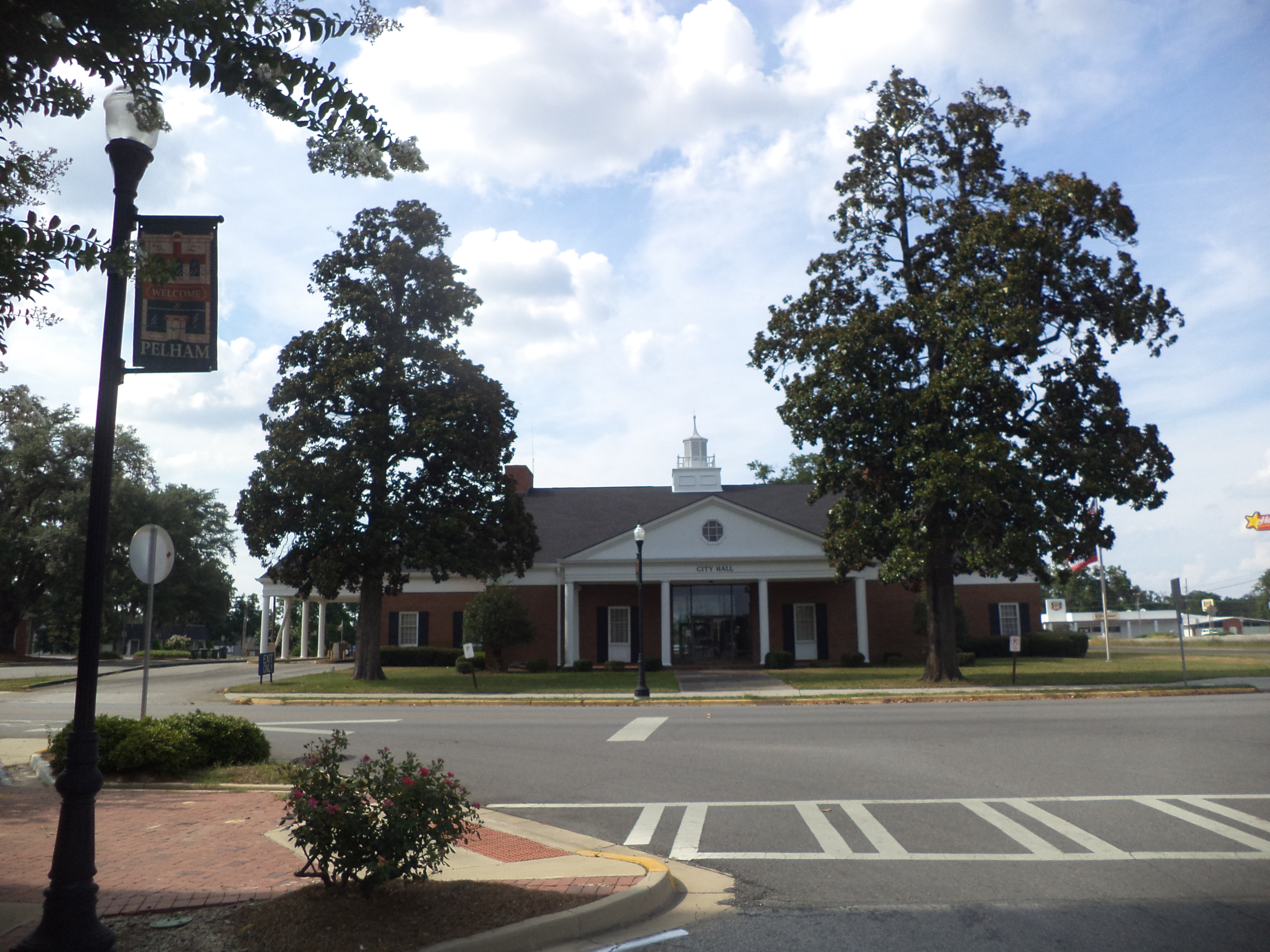
- Pelham City Hall

- Location in Mitchell County and the state of Georgia
- Coordinates: 31°7′36″N 84°9′10″W
- Country: United States
- State: Georgia
- County: Mitchell

Government
  - Mayor: James T. Eubanks
  - City Manager: Craig M. Bennett

Area
  - Total: 4.08 sq mi (10.56 km^{2})
  - Land: 4.08 sq mi (10.56 km^{2})
  - Water: 0 sq mi (0.00 km^{2})
- Elevation: 360 ft (110 m)

Population (2020)
  - Total: 3,507
  - Density: 860.1/sq mi (332.08/km^{2})
- Time zone: UTC-5 (Eastern (EST))
  - Summer (DST): UTC-4 (EDT)
- ZIP code: 31779
- Area code: 229
- FIPS code: 13-59976
- GNIS feature ID: 0320347
- Website: cityofpelhamga.com

Pelham is a city in Mitchell County, Georgia, United States. The population was 3,507 at the 2020 census, down from 3,898 in 2010. Pelham is well known for its agriculture, with vast farming of cotton and pecans in the area.

== History ==
Pelham was incorporated in 1881 and named in honor of Confederate officer John Pelham, who was born to a family of slave owners in northeastern Alabama in 1838.

== Geography ==
Pelham is in southeastern Mitchell County at 31°7′36″N 84°9′10″W (31.126629, -84.152703), sitting at the crossroads of US 19 and State Route 93. U.S. 19 passes through the east side of the city and leads northwest 8 miles (13 km) to Camilla, the county seat, and southeast 25 miles (40 km) to Thomasville. State Route 93 passes through the center of town, leading northeast 14 miles (23 km) to Sale City and south 19 miles (31 km) to Cairo, while State Route 65 leads west from Pelham 14 miles (23 km) to Hopeful.

According to the United States Census Bureau, Pelham has a total area of 4.1 square miles (11 km^{2}), all of it recorded as land.

Pelham has a humid subtropical climate, characterized by humid summers and mild winters. It receives an average of 52 inches (1,300 mm) of rain per year. The average number of days with any measurable precipitation is 90. Pelham has on average 233 sunny days per year. The July high is around 93 °F (34 °C), while the January low is 39 °F (4 °C).

== Demographics ==
Historical population
Census	Pop.	Note	%±
1880	168		—
1890	385		129.2%
1900	945		145.5%
1910	1,880		98.9%
1920	2,640		40.4%
1930	2,762		4.6%
1940	2,579		−6.6%
1950	4,365		69.3%
1960	4,609		5.6%
1970	4,539		−1.5%
1980	4,306		−5.1%
1990	3,869		−10.1%
2000	4,126		6.6%
2010	3,898		−5.5%
2020	3,507		−10.0%
U.S. Decennial Census; 1850-1870 1870-1880; 1890-1910 1920-1930; 1940 1950 1960; 1970 1980 1990; 2000 2010

=== 2020 census ===
As of the 2020 census, Pelham had a population of 3,507 and 857 families. The median age was 38.8 years. 25.9% of residents were under the age of 18 and 18.0% of residents were 65 years of age or older. For every 100 females there were 81.5 males, and for every 100 females age 18 and over there were 77.8 males age 18 and over.

0.0% of residents lived in urban areas, while 100.0% lived in rural areas.

There were 1,354 households in Pelham, of which 33.5% had children under the age of 18 living in them. Of all households, 28.3% were married-couple households, 18.8% were households with a male householder and no spouse or partner present, and 46.0% were households with a female householder and no spouse or partner present. About 30.6% of all households were made up of individuals and 14.3% had someone living alone who was 65 years of age or older.

There were 1,516 housing units, of which 10.7% were vacant. The homeowner vacancy rate was 1.3% and the rental vacancy rate was 7.4%.

Pelham racial composition as of 2020
Race	Num.	Perc.
White (non-Hispanic)	1,174	33.48%
Black or African American (non-Hispanic)	2,082	59.37%
Native American	6	0.17%
Asian	16	0.46%
Other/Mixed	111	3.17%
Hispanic or Latino	118	3.36%

== Education ==
The Pelham City School District, which conforms to the municipal boundaries, holds pre-school to grade 12, and consists of one elementary school, a middle school and a high school. The district has 101 full-time teachers and over 1,627 students.

- Pelham Elementary School
- Pelham City Middle School
- Pelham High School

== Notable people ==
- Donnie Cochran, former commander of the Blue Angels Precision Air team and first black member
- Don Griffin, two-time Super Bowl winner with San Francisco 49'ers
