= Camilla, Georgia =

- City
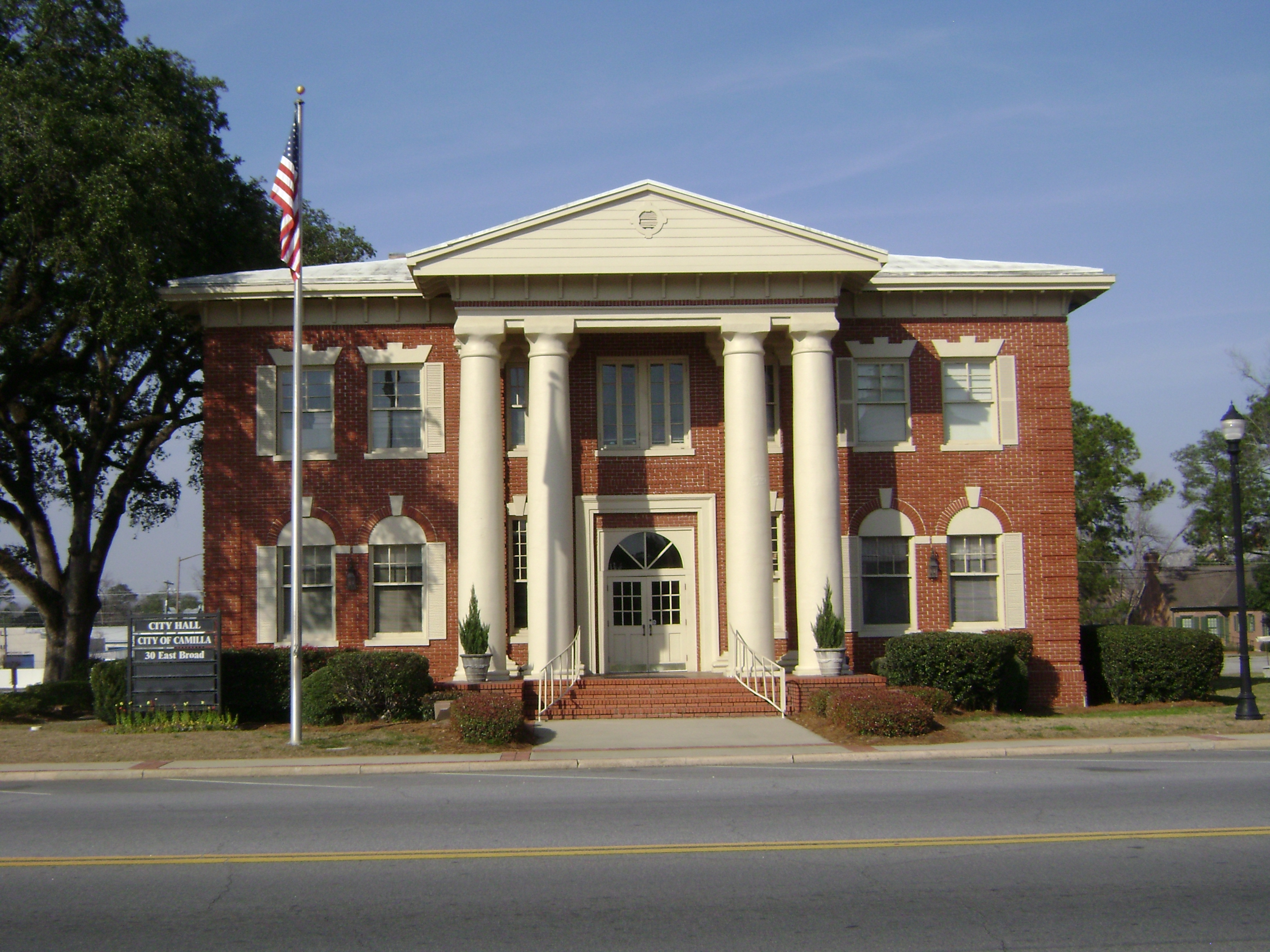
- Camilla City Hall

- Location in Mitchell County and the state of Georgia
- Coordinates: 31°13′49″N 84°12′33″W
- Country: United States
- State: Georgia
- County: Mitchell

Government
  - Mayor: Kelvin M. Owens

Area
  - Total: 6.61 sq mi (17.13 km^{2})
  - Land: 6.60 sq mi (17.10 km^{2})
  - Water: 0.012 sq mi (0.03 km^{2})
- Elevation: 177 ft (54 m)

Population (2020)
  - Total: 5,187
  - Density: 785.6/sq mi (303.34/km^{2})
- Time zone: UTC-5 (Eastern (EST))
  - Summer (DST): UTC-4 (EDT)
- ZIP code: 31730
- Area code: 229
- FIPS code: 13-12624
- GNIS feature ID: 0331312
- Website: www.camillaga.net

Camilla is a city in Mitchell County, Georgia, United States, and is its county seat. As of the 2020 census, the city had a population of 5,187, down from 5,360 in 2010.

== History ==
The city was incorporated in 1858. The name "Camilla" was chosen in honor of the granddaughter of Henry Mitchell, a Revolutionary War general for whom Mitchell County was named.

Camilla and Mitchell County were originally Creek country, surrendered to the United States in the 1814 Treaty of Fort Jackson. Georgia divided the land ceded by Native Americans into lots to be given away in land lotteries. The lottery of 1820 awarded lands covering much of the southwest section of the state (applying only to land south of the future Lee County line and extending west to the Chattahoochee River and east to settled counties in east Georgia), including the area later known as Mitchell County. Despite having access to free land, few people moved to the region. Citizens hesitated to improve land, according to an early twentieth-century history the region "which God Almighty had left in an unfinished condition." It took approximately forty years (1820–1857) for the area to obtain its necessary legal population to become a separate county, after which Camilla became the county seat.

In the early 2000s, the city was hit by two disastrous sets of tornadoes, both occurring in the dark hours of the early morning and both going through roughly the same area. The first outbreak was on February 14, 2000; the second was on March 20, 2003.

=== Camilla massacre ===
Camilla became the site of a racially motivated political white-on-black riot on Saturday, September 19, 1868. Determined to promote political and social reform with an organized rally, 150–300 freedmen, along with Republican political candidates, marched toward the town's courthouse square for the rally. The local sheriff and "citizens committee" in the majority-white town warned the black and white activists of the impending violence and demanded that they forfeit their guns, even though carrying weapons was customary at the time. The marchers refused to give up their guns and continued to the courthouse square, where a group of local whites, quickly deputized by the sheriff, fired upon them. This assault forced the republicans and freedmen to retreat as the local democrats gave chase into the swamps, killing an estimated nine to fifteen of the black rally participants while wounding forty others. "Whites proceeded through the countryside over the next two weeks, beating and warning Negroes that they would be killed if they tried to vote in the coming election." The Camilla massacre was the culmination of smaller acts of violence committed by white inhabitants that had plagued southwest Georgia since the end of the Civil War.^{(pp. 1–2)}

=== Beating of Marion King ===
On July 23, 1962, a group of civil rights activists tried to visit fellow demonstrators from Albany, Georgia, who had been jailed in Camilla. While the rally took place, Marion King, wife of Albany Movement's vice president Slater King, was beaten to the ground and kicked by Camilla police guards until she was unconscious. Mrs. King was pregnant at the time and had her young children with her. She suffered a miscarriage after the ordeal. The 2012 song "Camilla" from the eponymous album by Caroline Herring pays a tribute to Mrs. King's memory.

== Geography ==
Camilla is located in central Mitchell County at 31°13′49″N 84°12′33″W (31.230243, −84.209102). U.S. Route 19 is the main highway through the city, passing east of the downtown. US 19 leads north 27 miles (43 km) to Albany and southeast 32 miles (51 km) to Thomasville. State Routes 37 and 112 pass through the center of Camilla as Broad Street. Route 37 leads east 27 miles (43 km) to Moultrie and northwest 10 miles (16 km) to Newton, while Route 112 leads northeast 32 miles (51 km) to Sylvester and south 26 miles (42 km) to Cairo. State Route 97 leads southwest from Camilla 35 miles (56 km) to Bainbridge.

According to the United States Census Bureau, the city has a total area of 6.6 square miles (17 km^{2}), of which 0.01 square miles (0.03 km^{2}), or 0.20%, are water.

=== Climate ===
The climate in this area is characterized by hot, humid summers and generally mild to cool winters. According to the Köppen Climate Classification system, Camilla has a humid subtropical climate, abbreviated "Cfa" on climate maps. Camilla has a relatively wet climate with high precipitation year-round, as typical of the eastern United States. Its southerly latitude in Georgia causes a greater tropical influence resulting in very mild winters in comparison with Atlanta for example.

Climate data for Camilla, Georgia (normals 1991–2020, extremes 1889–present)
Month	Jan	Feb	Mar	Apr	May	Jun	Jul	Aug	Sep	Oct	Nov	Dec	Year
Record high °F (°C)	85 (29)	87 (31)	91 (33)	99 (37)	105 (41)	105 (41)	107 (42)	105 (41)	104 (40)	98 (37)	90 (32)	88 (31)	107 (42)
Mean maximum °F (°C)	75.4 (24.1)	78.2 (25.7)	82.7 (28.2)	86.7 (30.4)	91.8 (33.2)	95.0 (35.0)	95.8 (35.4)	95.5 (35.3)	92.8 (33.8)	88.5 (31.4)	82.8 (28.2)	77.3 (25.2)	97.2 (36.2)
Mean daily maximum °F (°C)	60.4 (15.8)	64.2 (17.9)	70.4 (21.3)	77.3 (25.2)	84.4 (29.1)	88.7 (31.5)	90.4 (32.4)	89.8 (32.1)	86.3 (30.2)	79.0 (26.1)	70.0 (21.1)	62.9 (17.2)	77.0 (25.0)
Daily mean °F (°C)	49.0 (9.4)	52.5 (11.4)	58.4 (14.7)	65.3 (18.5)	73.1 (22.8)	79.0 (26.1)	81.1 (27.3)	80.6 (27.0)	76.4 (24.7)	67.4 (19.7)	57.4 (14.1)	51.5 (10.8)	66.0 (18.9)
Mean daily minimum °F (°C)	37.7 (3.2)	40.7 (4.8)	46.4 (8.0)	53.4 (11.9)	61.8 (16.6)	69.4 (20.8)	71.9 (22.2)	71.3 (21.8)	66.6 (19.2)	55.7 (13.2)	44.7 (7.1)	40.1 (4.5)	55.0 (12.8)
Mean minimum °F (°C)	21.4 (−5.9)	25.1 (−3.8)	30.1 (−1.1)	38.9 (3.8)	48.6 (9.2)	61.7 (16.5)	66.9 (19.4)	64.7 (18.2)	54.8 (12.7)	39.2 (4.0)	29.0 (−1.7)	25.0 (−3.9)	19.4 (−7.0)
Record low °F (°C)	2 (−17)	1 (−17)	17 (−8)	32 (0)	40 (4)	49 (9)	56 (13)	56 (13)	36 (2)	30 (−1)	15 (−9)	7 (−14)	1 (−17)
Average precipitation inches (mm)	5.00 (127)	4.76 (121)	5.21 (132)	4.00 (102)	2.30 (58)	5.56 (141)	5.25 (133)	5.28 (134)	4.03 (102)	2.75 (70)	3.19 (81)	4.24 (108)	51.57 (1,309)
Average precipitation days (≥ 0.1 in)	6.6	5.6	6.1	4.7	4.3	8.3	8.8	8.0	5.2	3.9	4.5	6.0	72
Source: NOAA

== Demographics ==
Historical population
Census	Pop.	Note	%±
1870	289		—
1880	672		132.5%
1890	866		28.9%
1900	1,051		21.4%
1910	1,827		73.8%
1920	2,136		16.9%
1930	2,025		−5.2%
1940	2,588		27.8%
1950	3,745		44.7%
1960	4,753		26.9%
1970	4,987		4.9%
1980	5,414		8.6%
1990	5,008		−7.5%
2000	5,669		13.2%
2010	5,360		−5.5%
2020	5,187		−3.2%
U.S. Decennial Census; 1850-1870 1870-1880; 1890-1910 1920-1930; 1940 1950 1960; 1970 1980 1990; 2000 2010

=== 2020 census ===
As of the 2020 census, Camilla had a population of 5,187. The median age was 39.4 years. 25.4% of residents were under the age of 18 and 18.0% of residents were 65 years of age or older. For every 100 females there were 79.0 males, and for every 100 females age 18 and over there were 72.3 males age 18 and over.

Camilla racial composition as of 2020
Race	Num.	Perc.
White (non-Hispanic)	1,148	22.13%
Black or African American (non-Hispanic)	3,781	72.89%
Native American	6	0.12%
Asian	38	0.73%
Other/Mixed	103	1.99%
Hispanic or Latino	111	2.14%

92.1% of residents lived in urban areas, while 7.9% lived in rural areas.

There were 2,077 households in Camilla, of which 32.5% had children under the age of 18 living in them. Of all households, 24.1% were married-couple households, 18.9% were households with a male householder and no spouse or partner present, and 50.9% were households with a female householder and no spouse or partner present. About 29.7% of all households were made up of individuals and 12.7% had someone living alone who was 65 years of age or older.

There were 2,304 housing units, of which 9.9% were vacant. The homeowner vacancy rate was 1.8% and the rental vacancy rate was 7.8%.

== Education ==
=== Mitchell County School District ===
The Mitchell County School District holds grades pre-school to grade twelve, and consists of one elementary school that's in Baconton GA, a middle school, a high school, and one charter school. The district has 176 full-time teachers and over 2,855 students. The Mitchell County Head Start Center opened in 2001. District schools include:

- South Mitchell County Elementary School
- North Mitchell County Elementary School
- Mitchell County Middle School
- Mitchell County High School

=== Charter school ===
- Baconton Community Charter School

=== Private education ===
- Westwood Schools

=== Higher education ===
Andersonville Theological Seminary has its headquarters based in Camilla. The distance education seminary is accredited through the Association of Independent Christian College and Seminaries. The seminary's headquarters consists of two administrative buildings. It's widely reported by former students that the seminary is a diploma mill where sub-standard degrees are given for little or no actual coursework.

== Government ==
The legislative authority of the government of the City of Camilla is vested in the six-member Council. Council members serve for terms of four years and until their respective successors are elected and qualified. Three members are elected from and by the voters of Council District No. 1, and three members are elected from and by the voters of Council District No. 2.

Mayor

- Mayor Kelvin Owens (term expires December 31, 2023)

Council members

- W.D. Palmer, III (District 2; term expires December 31, 2025)
- Raymond Dewayne Burley (District 1; term expires December 31, 2025)
- Corey Morgan (District 1; term expires December 31, 2023)
- Steve Collins (District 2; term expires December 31, 2023)
- Venterra Pollard (District 1; term expires December 31, 2025)
- Laura Beth Tucker (District 2; term expires December 31, 2025)

== Transportation ==
- U.S. Highway 19 is the major travel route through the city, connecting Camilla to Albany in the north and Thomasville to the south
- Georgia State Route 112 connects Cairo to the south and Sylvester to the northeast
- Georgia State Route 37 connects Moultrie to the east
- Georgia State Route 311 and Georgia State Route 97 connects Bainbridge to the southeast

== Notable people ==
- Kathryn Stripling Byer (1944–2017), poet and teacher; North Carolina Poet Laureate 2005–2009
- Oscar Branch Colquitt (1861–1940), former governor of Texas
- Danny Copeland (born 1966), NFL defensive back; Super Bowl winner with Washington Redskins
- Tiger Flowers (1895–1927), first Black middleweight boxing champion of the world
- James Griffin (born 1961), ex-NFL safety with Detroit Lions
- Krysta Harden, former U.S. Deputy Secretary of Agriculture
- Jumaine Jones (born 1979), professional basketball forward for Bnei HaSharon of Israel
- Fred Nixon (born 1958), ex-NFL player with Green Bay Packers
- Grover Stewart, NFL defensive tackle
- Orson Swindle (born 1937), US Marine Corps colonel and former POW with John McCain in Vietnam

== Gallery ==
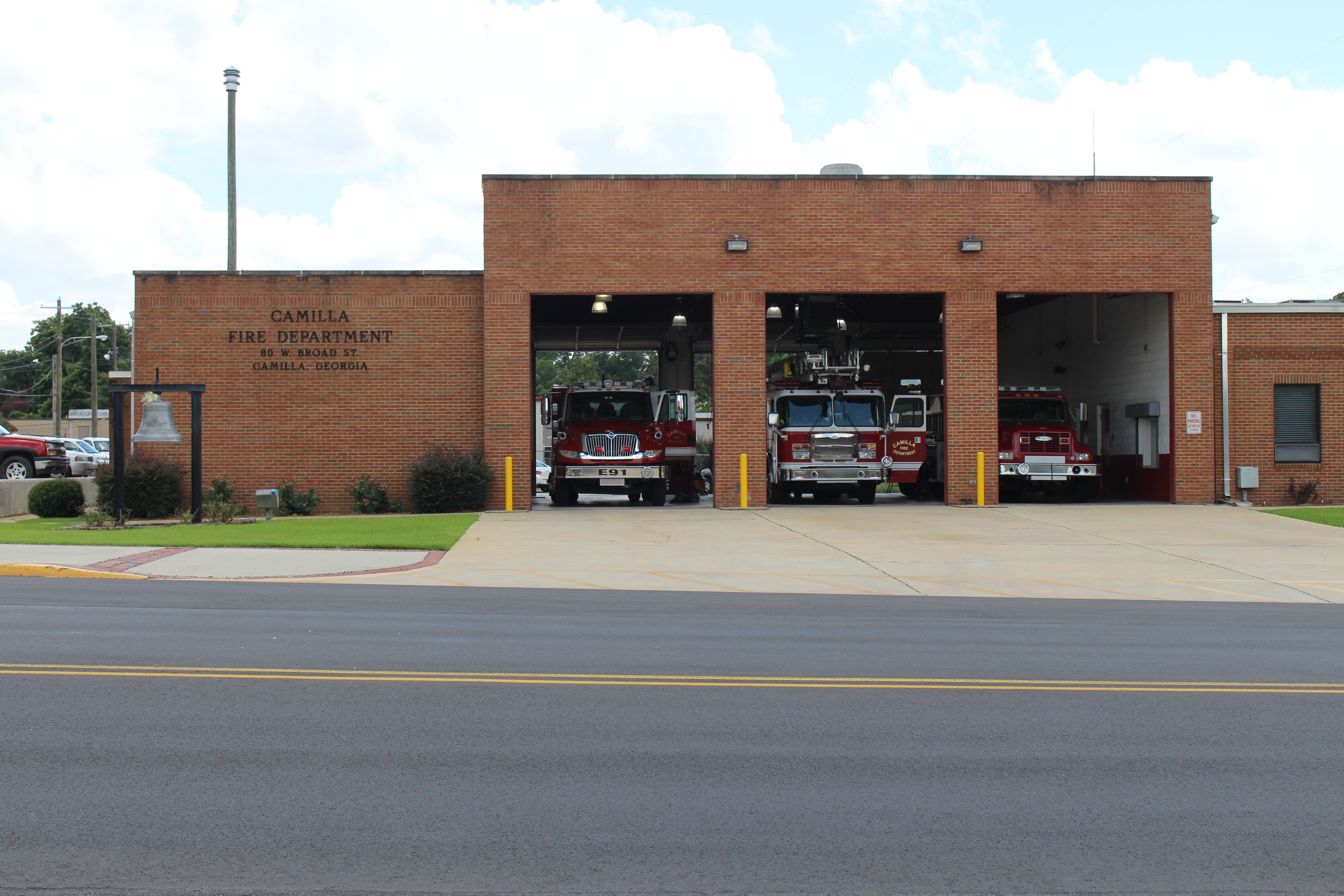
Camilla Fire Department

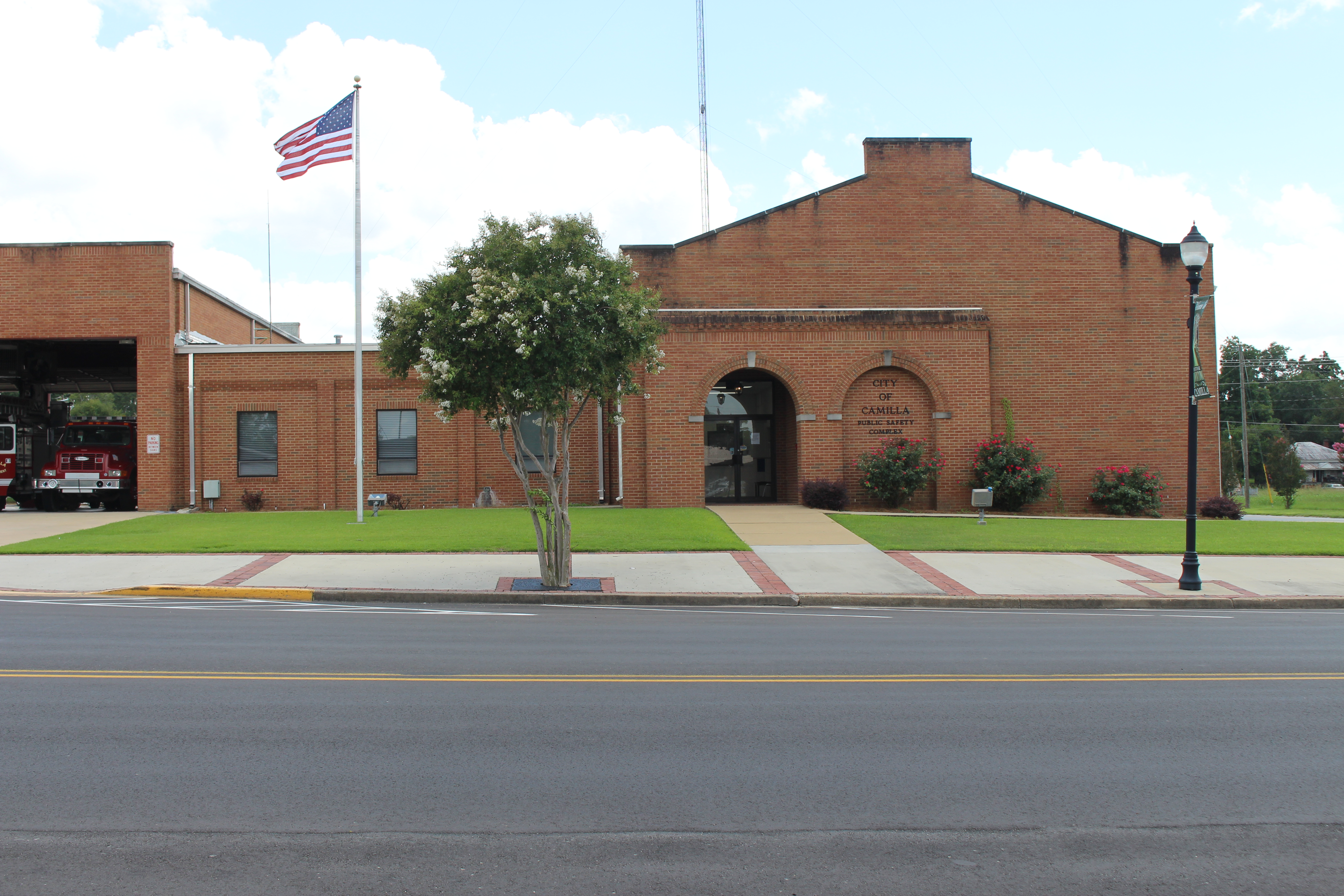
City of Camilla Public Safety Complex, which is attached to the fire station

== See also ==
- Impact of the 2019–20 coronavirus pandemic on the meat industry in the United States
