= Attapulgus, Georgia =

- City
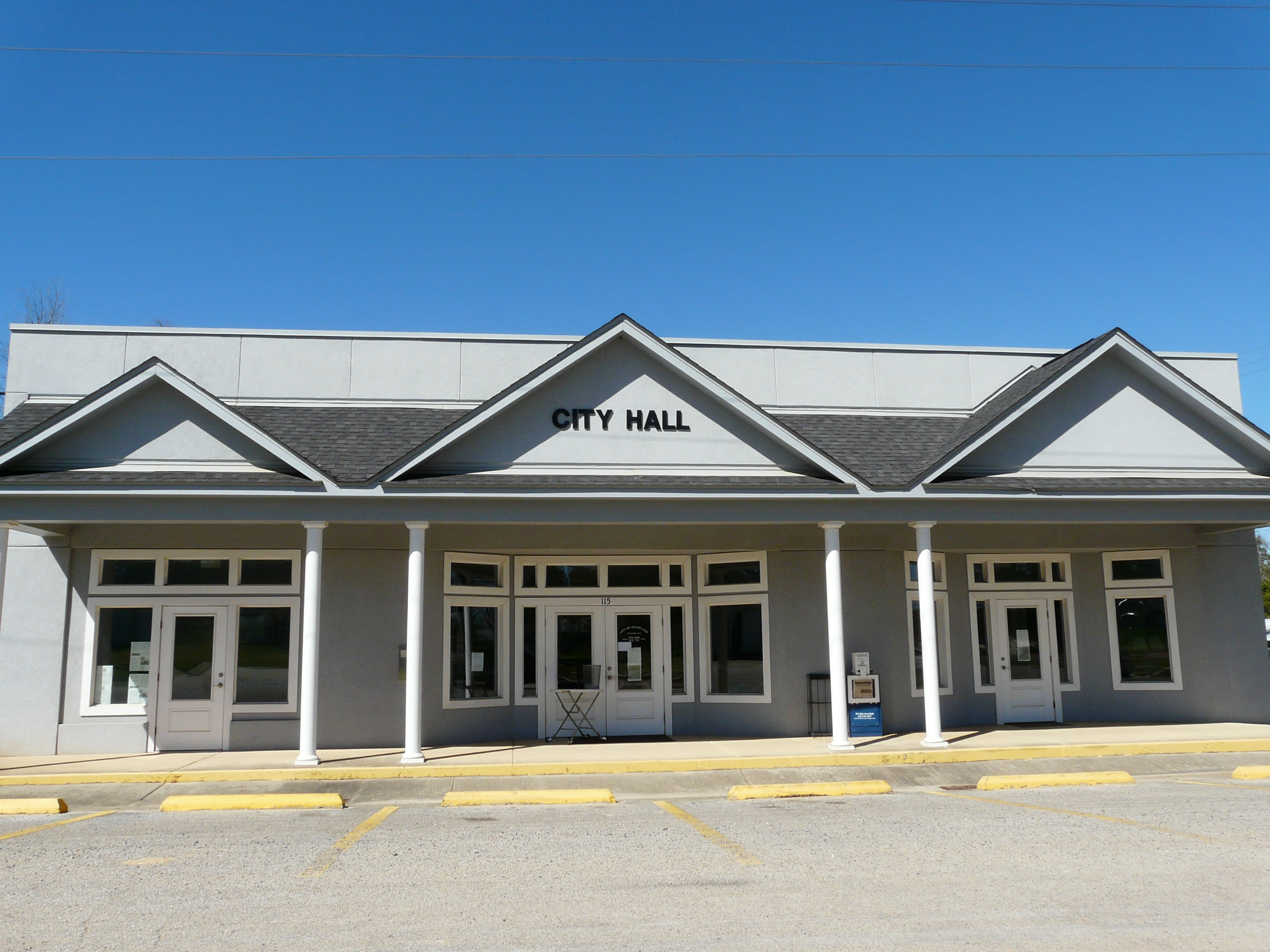
- Attapulgus City Hall

- Location in Decatur County and the state of Georgia
- Coordinates: 30°44′54″N 84°29′2″W
- Country: United States
- State: Georgia
- County: Decatur

Area
  - Total: 0.80 sq mi (2.06 km^{2})
  - Land: 0.80 sq mi (2.06 km^{2})
  - Water: 0 sq mi (0.00 km^{2})
- Elevation: 318 ft (97 m)

Population (2020)
  - Total: 454
  - Density: 570.2/sq mi (220.14/km^{2})
- Time zone: UTC-5 (Eastern (EST))
  - Summer (DST): UTC-4 (EDT)
- ZIP codes: 31715, 39815
- Area code: 229
- FIPS code: 13-04084
- GNIS feature ID: 0354409
- Website: georgiainfo.galileo.usg.edu/topics/historical_markers/county/decatur/attapulgus

Attapulgus is a city in Decatur County, Georgia, United States. As of the 2020 census, the city had a population of 454, up from 449 at the 2010 census. It is part of the Bainbridge, Georgia micropolitan statistical area.

The town's name is a Muscogee word meaning "Dogwood"; due to the abundance of attapulgite, which makes up the clay soil throughout much of the Southeast, the mineral was named after the town.

Attapulgus was the birthplace of civil rights leader Hosea Williams (1926–2000), who was run out of town by a lynch mob at the age of 13. He was known for his close association with Dr. Martin Luther King Jr., and for leading, with John Lewis, the famous march across the Edmund Pettus Bridge in Selma, Alabama, in 1965 that led to the passage of the landmark Voting Rights Act of 1965. Williams served on the Atlanta City Council, the DeKalb County Commission, and in the Georgia Senate. He also started a program to feed the hungry that has continued long after his death.

== Geography ==
Attapulgus is located at 30°44′54″N 84°29′2″W (30.748243, -84.483810).

The city is located near the Georgia-Florida state line. U.S. Route 27 bypasses the city to the east, leading northwest 13 mi (21 km) to Bainbridge, the Decatur County seat, and southeast 30 mi (48 km) to Tallahassee, Florida. Georgia State Route 241 connects the city with the Florida state line 6 mi (9.7 km) to the southwest.

According to the United States Census Bureau, the city has a total area of 0.8 square miles (2.1 km^{2}), all land.

== Demographics ==
Historical population
Census	Pop.	Note	%±
1870	267		—
1880	255		−4.5%
1930	416		—
1940	315		−24.3%
1950	457		45.1%
1960	567		24.1%
1970	513		−9.5%
1980	623		21.4%
1990	380		−39.0%
2000	492		29.5%
2010	449		−8.7%
2020	454		1.1%
U.S. Decennial Census; 1850-1870 1870-1880; 1890-1910 1920-1930; 1940 1950 1960; 1970 1980 1990; 2000 2010

As of the census of 2000, there were 492 people, 179 households, and 129 families residing in the city. In 2020, its population was 454.
