= Vada, Georgia =

- Unincorporated community
- Location within Georgia Location within the United States
- Coordinates: 31°04′44″N 84°24′47″W
- Country: United States
- State: Georgia
- County: Decatur, Mitchell
- Time zone: UTC-5 (Eastern (EST))
  - Summer (DST): UTC-4 (EDT)
- ZIP code: 31730
- Area code: 229

Vada is an unincorporated community in Decatur and Mitchell counties, in the U.S. state of Georgia.

== History ==
A post office called Vada was established in 1892, and remained in operation until 1907. The community was named after Vada Wooten, the daughter of a local law enforcement agent. Early variant names were "Harrell" and "Pull-Tight".
