= Hopeful, Georgia =

- Unincorporated community
- Location within Georgia Location within the United States
- Coordinates: 31°10′8.4″N 84°23′34.8″W
- Country: United States
- State: Georgia
- County: Mitchell
- Elevation: 154 ft (47 m)
- Time zone: UTC-5 (Eastern (EST))
  - Summer (DST): UTC-4 (EDT)
- ZIP code: 31730
- Area code: 229

Hopeful is an unincorporated community located in Mitchell County, Georgia, United States.

== History ==
The community was so named on account of the first settlers' "hopeful" spirit.

== Geography ==
Hopeful sits at the intersection of Georgia Highway 65 and River Road. Georgia Highway 97, Colonial Road, Firetower Road, Broomsedge Road, Hopeful Park Road, and Willie Curtis Road also run through the area.
