= National Register of Historic Places listings in Worth County, Georgia =

This is a list of properties and districts in Worth County, Georgia that are listed on the National Register of Historic Places (NRHP).

This National Park Service list is complete through NPS recent listings posted May 1, 2026.

== Current listings ==
	Name on the Register	Image	Date listed	Location	City or town	Description
1	Possum Poke	Possum Poke	August 26, 1982 (#82002499)	US 82; 31°31′02″N 83°46′55″W	Poulan	Now owned by Abraham Baldwin Agricultural College
2	Poulan Library	Poulan Library	July 25, 2003 (#03000679)	S side of 100 block of Church St., across from the church 31°30′48″N 83°47′18″W	Poulan	Built in 1908
3	Sumner High School	Sumner High School	September 27, 1996 (#96001035)	716 Walnut St. 31°30′33″N 83°44′08″W	Sumner	
4	Sylvester Commercial Historic District	Sylvester Commercial Historic District	July 9, 1987 (#87001153)	Bounded by E. Kelly, N. Main, E. Front, and N. Isabella Sts. (original) and approx. the jct. of Main St. and Liberty St., (increase); 31°31′36″N 83°50′16″W	Sylvester	Second set of boundaries represents a boundary increase of May 9, 2002
5	US Post Office-Sylvester	US Post Office-Sylvester	July 5, 1996 (#96000735)	122 N. Main St. 31°31′37″N 83°50′06″W	Sylvester	Built 1937-39
6	Worth County Courthouse	Worth County Courthouse	September 18, 1980 (#80001268)	Courthouse Sq. 31°31′41″N 83°50′09″W	Sylvester	Built 1905
7	Worth County Local Building	Worth County Local Building	August 21, 1980 (#80001269)	118 N. Isabella St. 31°31′38″N 83°50′15″W	Sylvester	Built 1911
