= Worth County School District =

School district in Georgia (U.S. state)

Address
- 103 Eldridge Street Sylvester, Worth, Georgia, 31791-1832; United States
- Coordinates: 31.534937°N 83.830000°W

District information
- Grades: Pre-school - 12
- Superintendent: Nehemiah Cummings
- Accreditation(s): Southern Association of Colleges and Schools; Georgia Accrediting Commission

Students and staff
- Enrollment: 4,354
- Faculty: 296

Other information
- Telephone: (229) 776-8600
- Fax: (229) 776-8603
- Website: www.worthschools.net

The Worth County School District is a public school district in Worth County, Georgia, United States, based in Sylvester. It serves the communities of Poulan, Sumner, Sylvester, and Warwick.

== Schools ==
The Worth County School District has two elementary schools, one middle school, and one high school.

=== Elementary schools ===
- Worth County Elementary School (Steven Rouse, Principal)
- Worth County Primary School (Jared Worthy, Principal)

=== Middle school ===
- Worth County Middle School (Jacque Walker, Interim Principal)

=== High school ===
- Worth County High School (Melissa Edwards, Principal)
