= WXZE =

Radio station in Sylvester, Georgia, United States (1963–1989)

- Sylvester, Georgia; United States
- Frequency: 1540 kHz

Ownership
- Owner: 5-Star Media, Inc.

History
- First air date: December 16, 1963; 62 years ago
- Last air date: Late 1980s

Technical information
- Facility ID: 143
- Power: 1,000 watts (daytime only)
- Transmitter coordinates: 31.51740°N 83.82490°W

WXZE was a radio station on 1540 AM in Sylvester, Georgia, operating between 1963 and the late 1980s.

== History ==
The station went on the air on December 16, 1963, as WOGA, owned by Worth County Broadcasters. It was a 1,000-watt, daytime-only station with studios in the historic First National Bank Building at 102 North Isabella Street. The original owners of Worth County Broadcasters, James Rouse and James Sutton, sold their stakes in the station to William R. Crews in 1972. The Crews family sold the station for $250,000 to Feldman Broadcasters, Inc., in 1979, and the new owners changed the call letters to WRSG on October 2. WRSG aired middle-of-the-road music.

In 1984, WRSG was sold to a group known as 5-Star Media; several of its members worked at radio stations in Atlanta. WRSG relaunched as WXZE on January 18, 1985; the new station branded as "Wixieland Country". In 1987, however, WXZE flipped to classic rock. The rock format flip received national attention because of the protest of one of the station's DJs. Kurt Andrews, upset at the change in format, barricaded himself in the control room, refused to answer the telephone, and proceeded to play Bob Seger's "Old Time Rock and Roll" for seven hours, stopping only for commercials and newscasts. While Andrews's contract precluded him from quitting or being fired, station manager Bryan O'Bryan quipped, "It doesn't say anything about what happens if I shoot him." The station folded not long after.
