= Possum Poke =

Historic site in Georgia, United States

- U.S. National Register of Historic Places
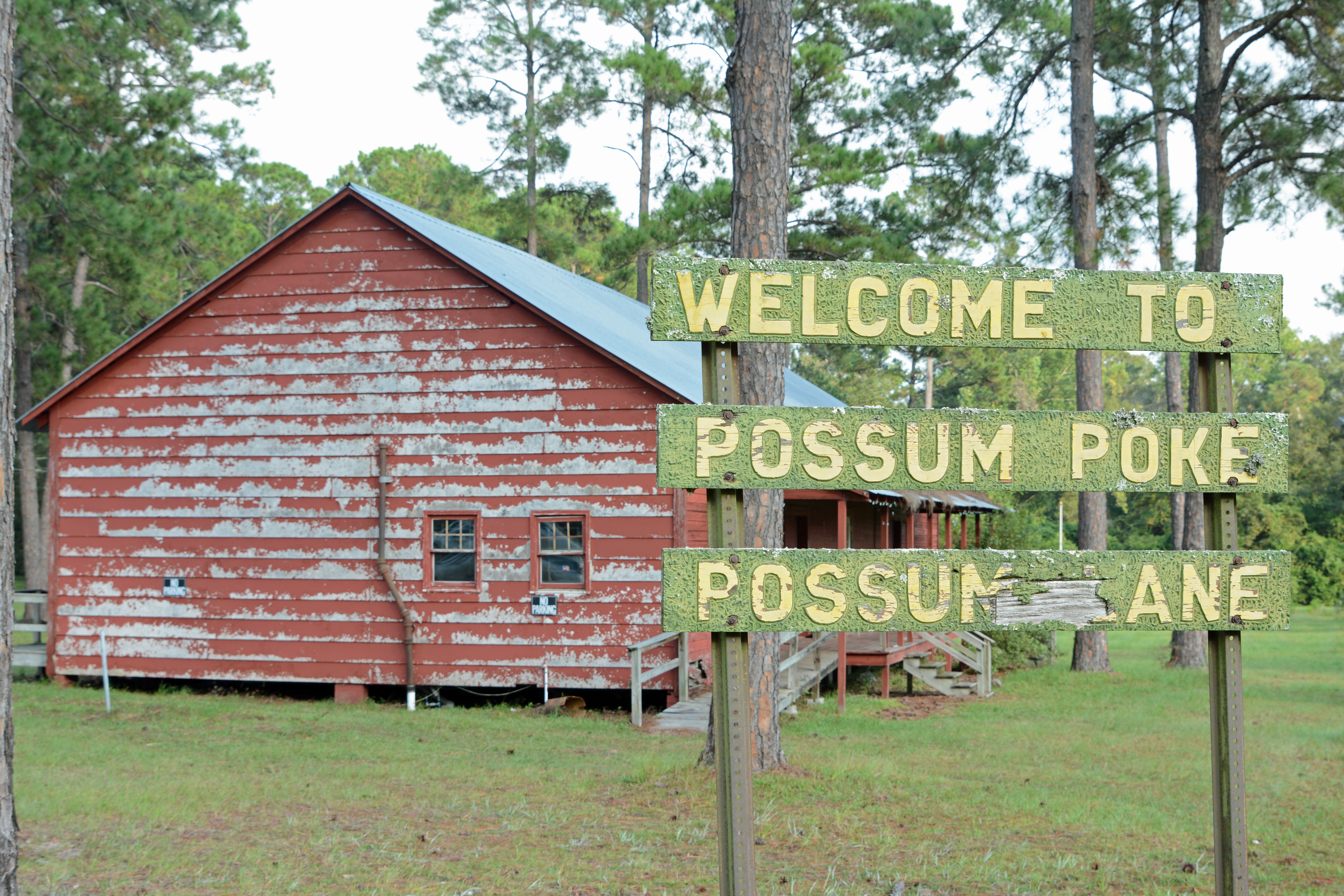
- Possum Poke welcome sign and a building

- Location within Georgia Location within the United States
- Location: US 82, Poulan, Georgia
- Coordinates: 31°31′02″N 83°46′55″W
- Area: 15 acres (6.1 ha)
- Built: 1905
- Architectural style: Bungalow/Craftsman, Plantation Plain
- NRHP reference No.: 82002499
- Added to NRHP: August 26, 1982

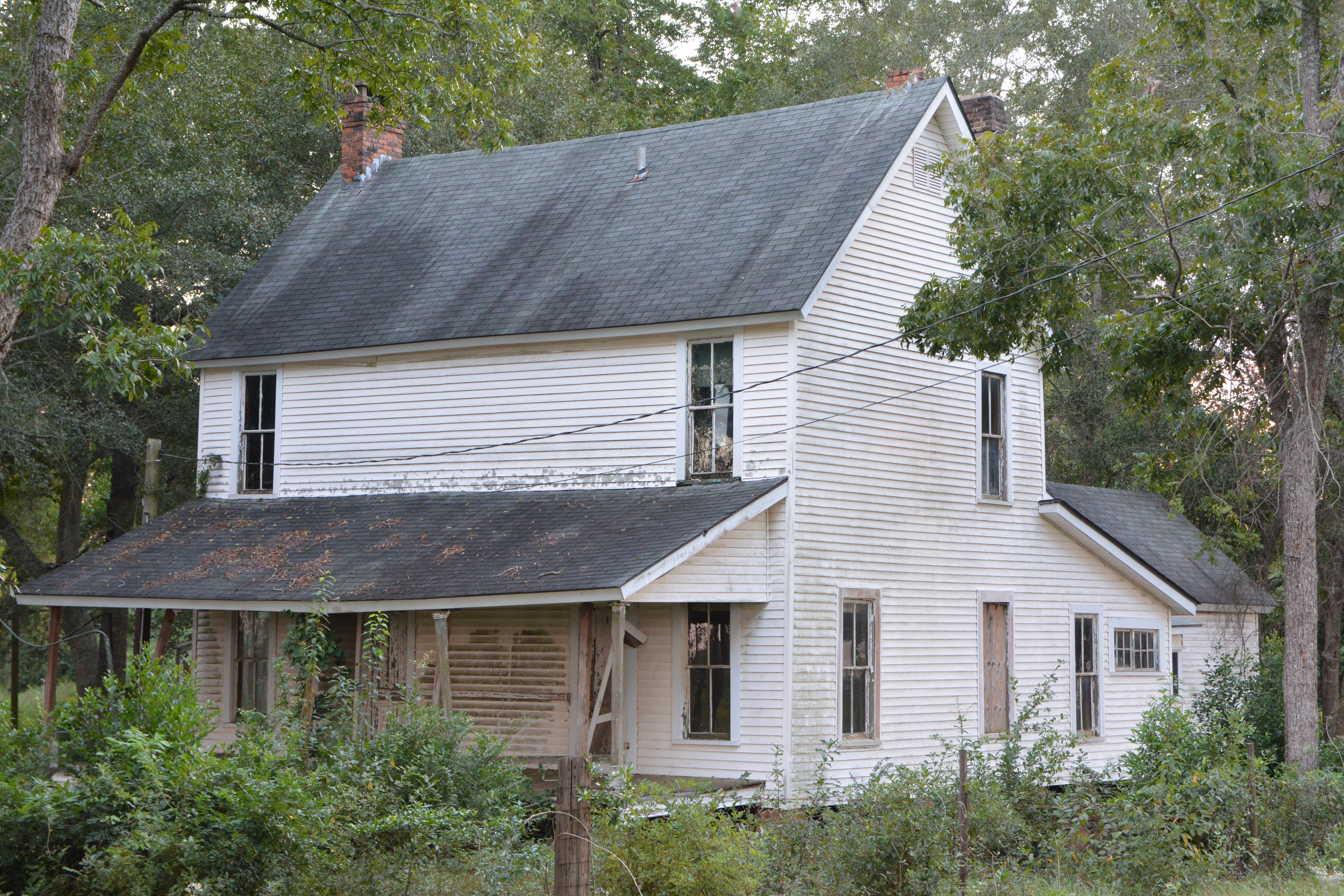
The "Big Poke" building

Possum Poke is a historic hunting retreat outside Poulan, Georgia, United States, and for years was the winter home of Chase Osborn, a former governor of Michigan, author and adventurer. Once a hunting camp, the two main buildings are "Big Poke" and "Little Poke". The "Big Poke" home was owned by Osborn, who died there in 1949. Stone monuments on the grounds commemorate him and his longtime confidante and second wife Stellanova Osborn, who died in 1988. Though these monuments are sometimes mistaken for the couple's gravestones, the Osborns are actually buried in Michigan.

The site is located on Possum Lane off U.S. Route 82. It is managed by the Sylvester-Worth County Chamber of Commerce, is open to the public, and is rentable for special events.

On April 25, 1974, three marker monuments, two boulders from the Hiawatha National Forest on Lake Superior and a flagpole were dedicated at the site. It was added to the National Register of Historic Places on August 26, 1982. The ownership of Possum Poke transferred from Worth County to the Abraham Baldwin Agricultural College in March 1999. At the time of the transfer, the condition of the house was deteriorating.

== See also ==
- National Register of Historic Places listings in Worth County, Georgia
