= Poulan Library =

Historic library in Georgia, US

- U.S. National Register of Historic Places
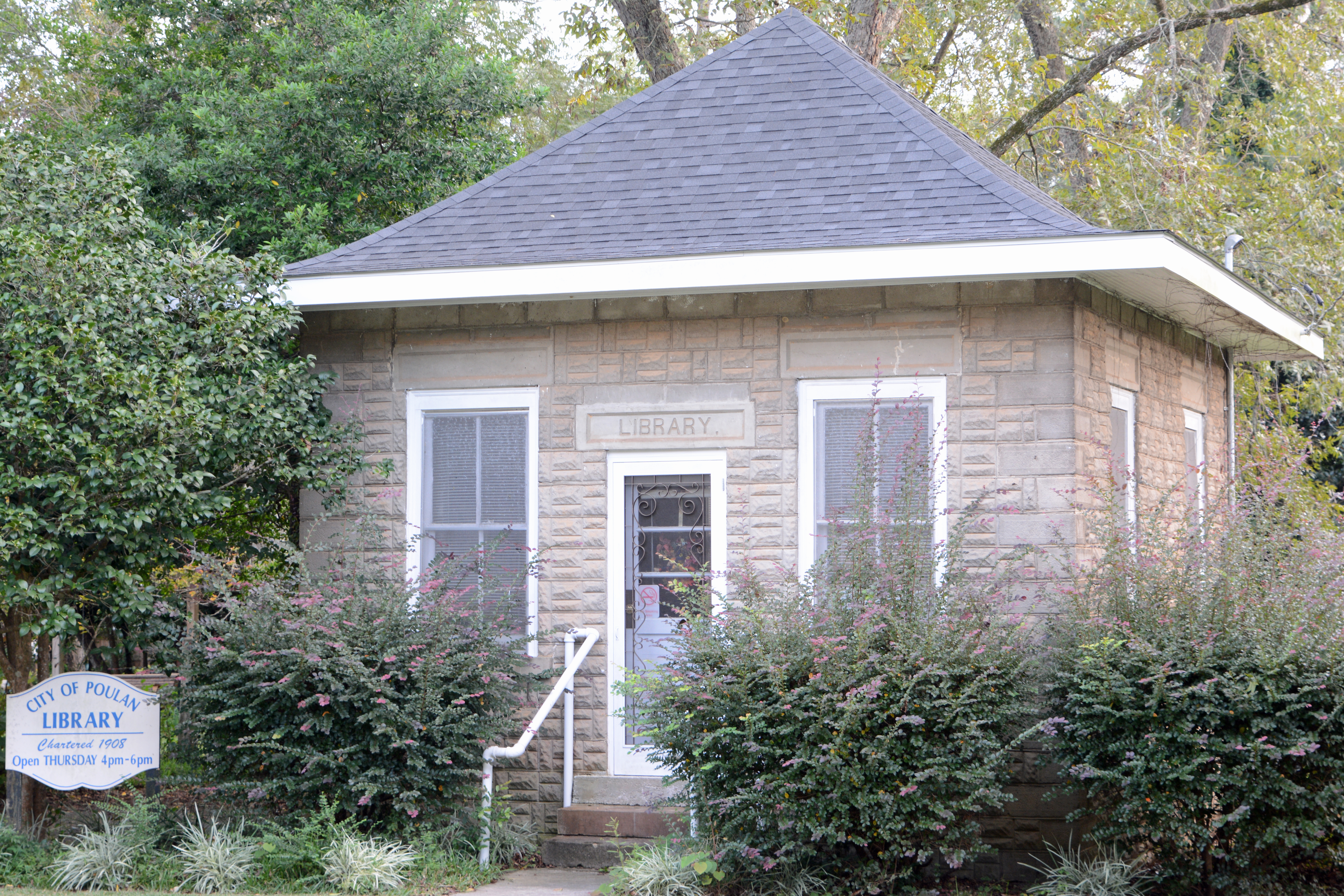

- Location within Georgia Location within the United States
- Location: S side of 100 blk. of Church St., Poulan, Georgia
- Coordinates: 31.51318°N 83.78827°W
- Area: 0.5 acres (0.20 ha)
- Built: 1908
- Architectural style: Colonial Revival
- NRHP reference No.: 03000679
- Added to NRHP: July 25, 2003

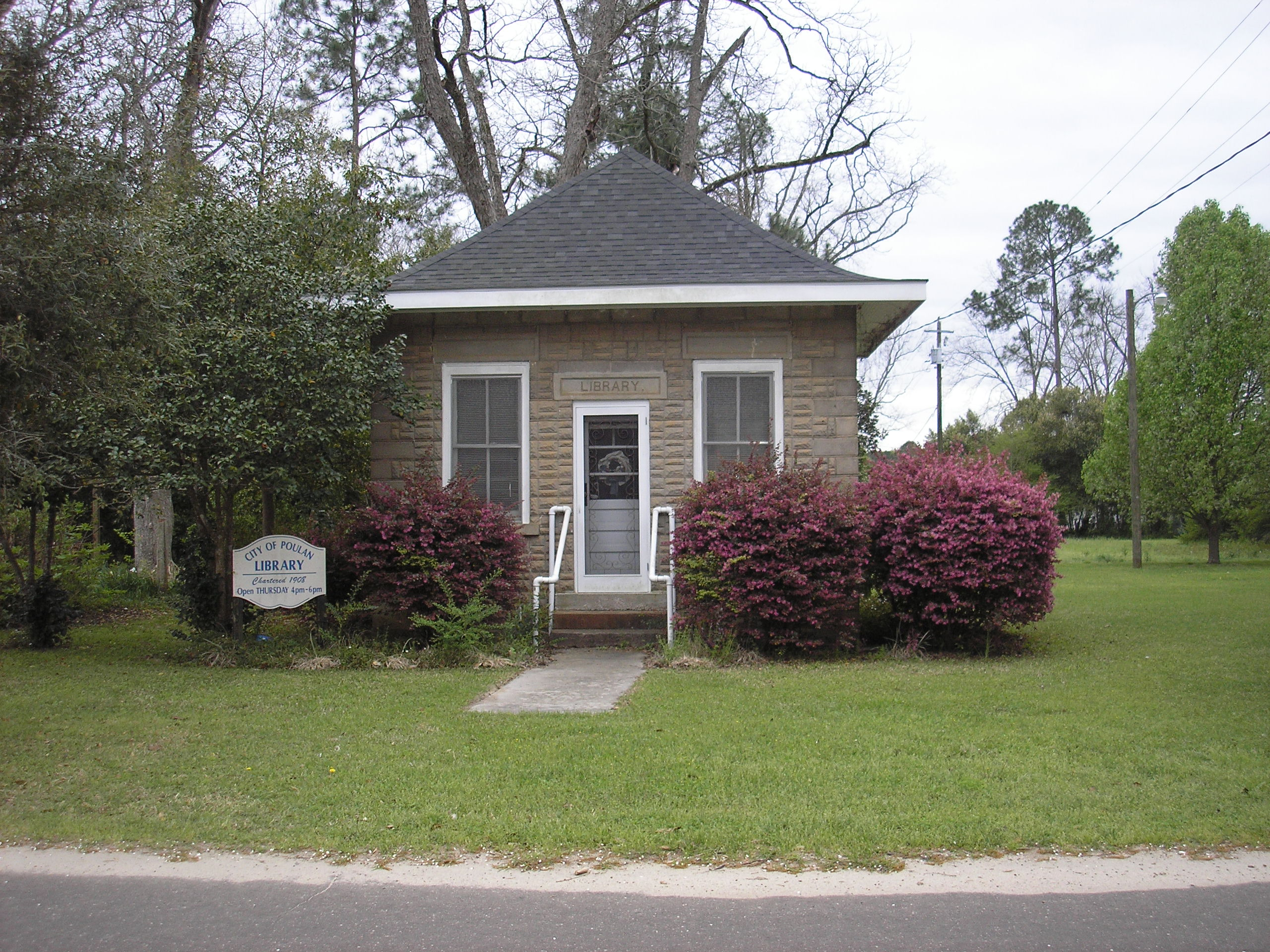
Library

Poulan Library is a historic and distinctively small library in Poulan, Georgia, United States. It was built in 1980 and added to the National Register of Historic Places on July 25, 2003. It is located on the south side of the 100 block of Church Street. It is open to the public on Thursday afternoons and by appointment.

== See also ==
- National Register of Historic Places listings in Worth County, Georgia
