= Worth County Courthouse (Georgia) =

- U.S. National Register of Historic Places
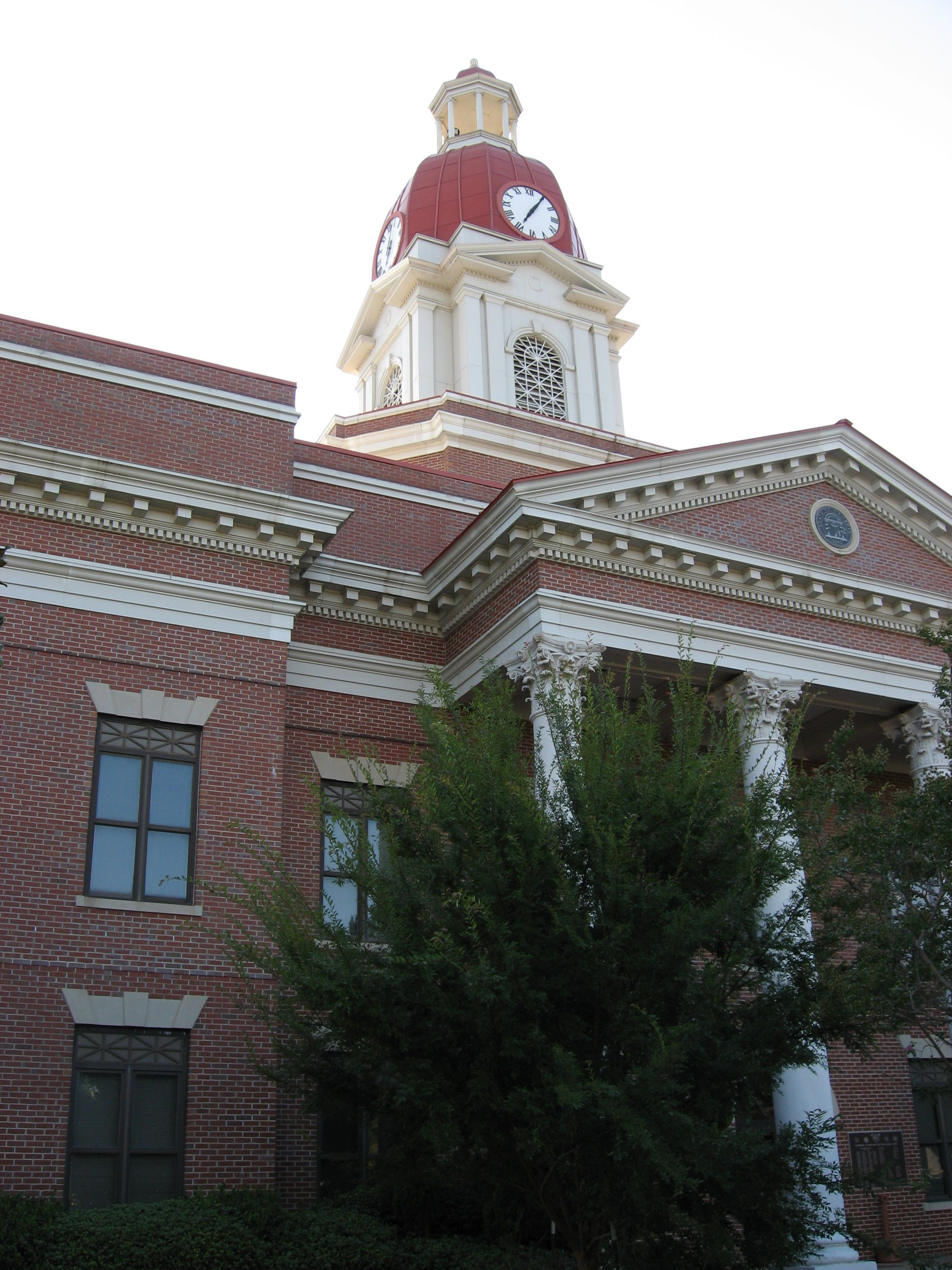

- Location within Georgia
- Location: Courthouse Sq., Sylvester, Georgia
- Coordinates: 31°31′40″N 83°50′10″W
- Area: 1 acre (0.40 ha)
- Built: 1905
- Built by: Totherow, T.G.,& Co.
- Architect: J.W. Golucke
- Architectural style: Classical Revival
- MPS: Georgia County Courthouses TR
- NRHP reference No.: 80001268
- Added to NRHP: September 18, 1980

The Worth County Courthouse, located in Courthouse Square in Sylvester, Georgia, is a historic courthouse building serving Worth County, Georgia. It was added to the National Register of Historic Places in 1980.

It was designed by J.W. Golucke and built in 1905 at a cost of $45,996.

== See also ==
- National Register of Historic Places listings in Worth County, Georgia
