= United States Post Office (Sylvester, Georgia) =

- U.S. Post Office-Sylvester
- U.S. National Register of Historic Places
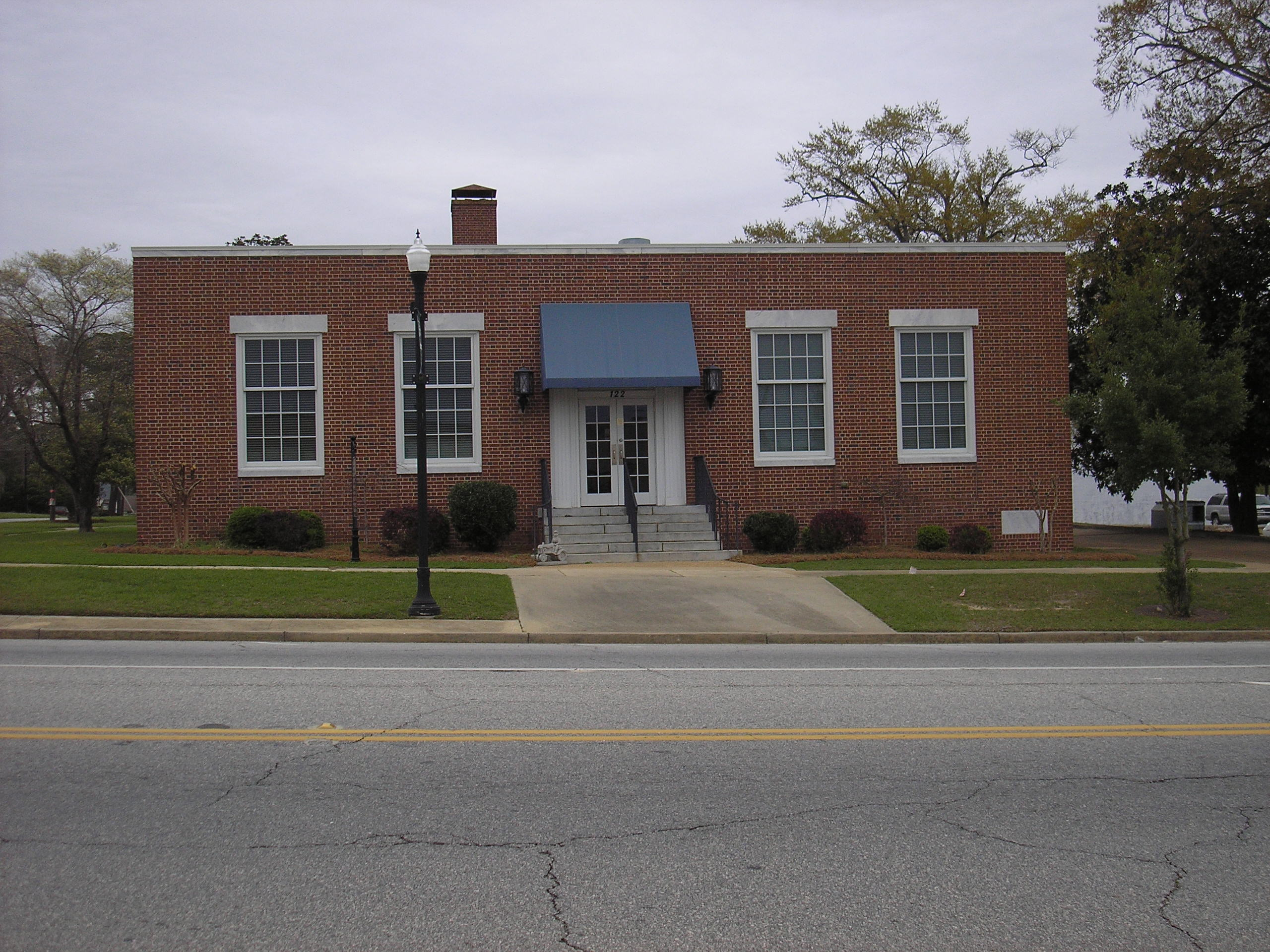

- Location within Georgia
- Location: 122 N. Main St., Sylvester, Georgia
- Coordinates: 31°31′37″N 83°50′6″W
- Area: 0.5 acres (0.20 ha)
- Built: 1939
- NRHP reference No.: 96000735
- Added to NRHP: July 5, 1996

The United States Post Office in Sylvester, Georgia is a historic post office. It was the area's only post office and is adorned with a mural from the New Deal era titled Cantaloupe Industry that was painted by Chester J. Tingler in 1939. It was added to the National Register of Historic Places on July 5, 1996. It is located at 122 North Main Street.

It is a rectangular, one-story building with Colonial Revival details applied to what has been termed as otherwise an International-style building. The International-style elements are its plain walls and windows and its flat composition roof.

== See also ==
- National Register of Historic Places listings in Worth County, Georgia
