= Sylvester Local News =

- Worth County Local Building
- U.S. National Register of Historic Places
- U.S. Historic district – Contributing property
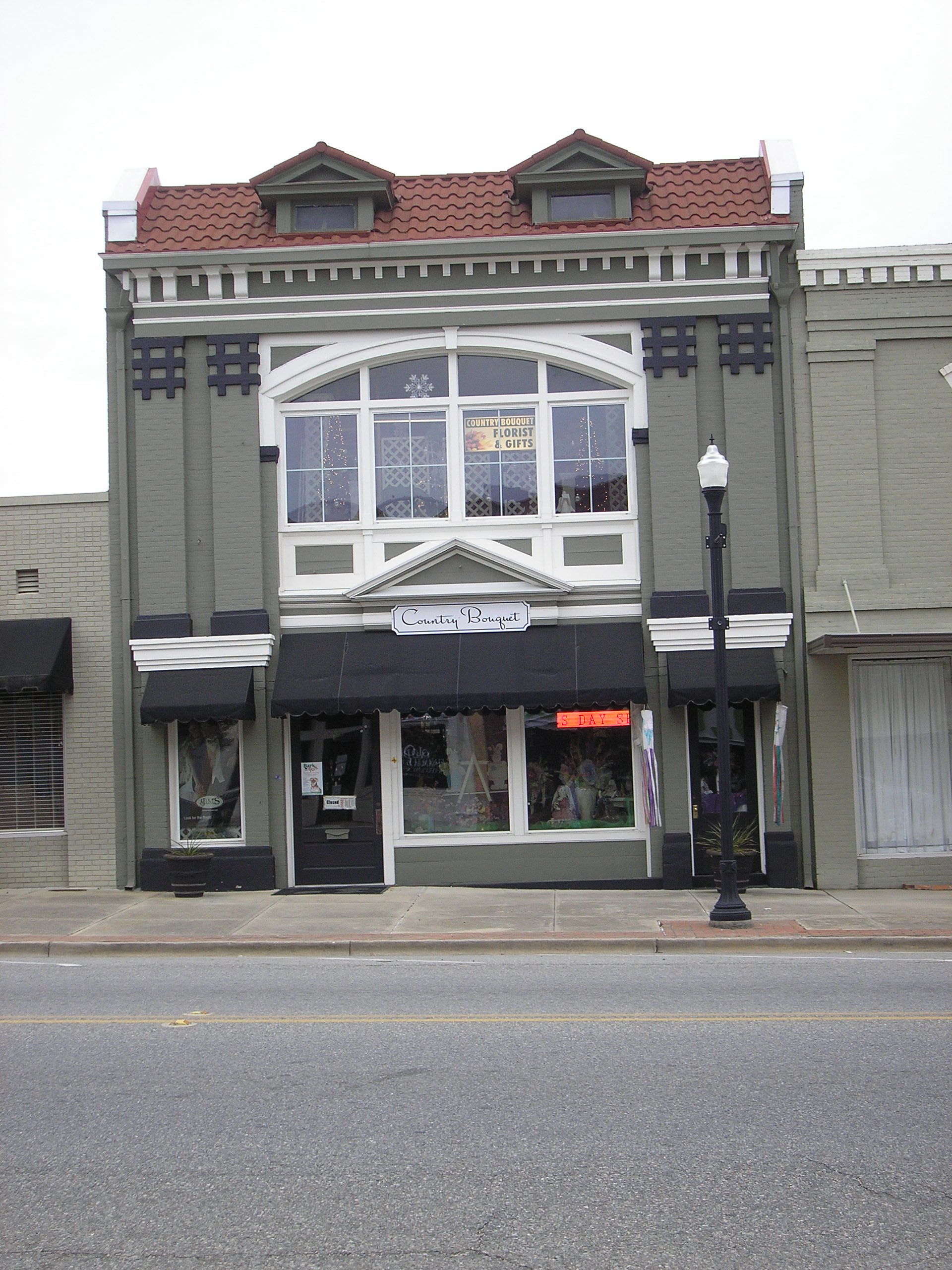

- Location within Georgia Location within the United States
- Location: 118 N. Isabella St., Sylvester, Georgia
- Coordinates: 31°31′38″N 83°50′15″W
- Area: less than one acre
- Built: 1911
- Architectural style: Beaux Arts
- Part of: Sylvester Commercial Historic District (ID87001153)
- NRHP reference No.: 80001269

Significant dates
- Added to NRHP: August 21, 1980
- Designated CP: July 9, 1987

The Sylvester Local News is a historic newspaper company in Sylvester, Worth County, Georgia. It is the oldest business in Worth County. The paper's brick building was constructed in the 1920s was individually listed on the National Register of Historic Places (NRHP) on August 21, 1980, as the Worth County Local Building. It is located at 118 North Isabella Street.

The newspaper business was established in 1884 as the Sumner Free Trader. The paper later changed its name to the Worth County Local. It then became the Sylvester Local and it is now the Sylvester Local News. It houses a linotype machine and other printing equipment. The building is open to the public.

The building is also a contributing building in the NRHP-listed Sylvester Commercial Historic District.

In 2016 the entire archival collection of the newspaper was scanned and uploaded for public access by the Margaret Jones Library of the Worth County Library System.

== See also ==
- National Register of Historic Places listings in Worth County, Georgia
