= Daniel Mack =

American WWI soldier and lynching victim

- Military career
- Allegiance: United States
- Branch: 372nd Infantry Regiment fighting as part of the 157th Infantry Division of the French Army, called the "Red Hand Division"
- Conflicts: World War I; Champagne region; Second Battle of the Marne; Meuse–Argonne offensive

Daniel Mack (born c. 1897) was a soldier from the 365th Infantry Regiment an all-Black unit that fought with honours in World War I. He was almost lynched but survived (Note: Some sources claim that he was killed in the lynch attack) during the Red Summer a period of racial violence in America.

== 365th Infantry Regiment ==
The 92nd Division was first constituted on paper 24 October 1917 in the National Army, over six months after the U.S. entry into World War I. The division was commanded throughout most of its existence by Major General Charles C. Ballou and was composed of the 183rd Infantry Brigade with the 365th and 366th Infantry Regiments, and the 184th Infantry Brigade with the 367th and 368th Infantry Regiments, together with supporting artillery, engineer, medical and signal units attached. The division was organized on 27 October 1917 at Camp Funston, Kansas, the men first being trained at the regimental level. For this division, 104 black captains, 397 first lieutenants, and 125 second lieutenants were trained at a "negro officers' camp" in Des Moines, Iowa. A special "negro zone" was to be built at the east end of Camp Funston, with "separate amusement places and exchanges. "A.D. Jellison, a banker of Junction City, Kansas, gave a plot of land for a "community house," to be erected by the black men from the seven states which sent African-American trainees.

== Lynching ==
Daniel Mack returned from the First World War and was hesitant to tolerate the Jim Crow south. During an April 5, 1919, market day in Sylvester, Georgia, Mack was walking through a busy street and brushed against a white man. The white man was offended that Mack didn't show the proper amount of respect and the two got in a scuffle. Police came on the scene and promptly arrested Mack for assault. During the trial, he was sentenced to 30 days in prison. A few days into his sentence, on April 14, a white mob broke into the prison, took him out into the wilderness and lynched Mack. He played dead and he was left for dead. No arrests were ever made.

== Bibliography ==
Notes

References

- The Chicago Defender (May 10, 1919). "Soldier in Uniform is Beaten in Georgia Town". The Chicago Defender. Chicago. ISSN 0745-7014.
- Horn, James Francis (2017). World War I and Jefferson County, West Virginia. Arcadia Publishing. ISBN 9781625857378.
- James, Rawn Jr. (2013). The Double V: How Wars, Protest, and Harry Truman Desegregated America's Military. Bloomsbury Publishing USA. ISBN 9781608196173.
- The Junction City (Kansas) Weekly Union (October 10, 1917). "To Camp Funston". The Junction City (Kansas) Weekly Union.
- The Junction City (Kansas) Weekly Union (November 15, 1917b). "A Negro Zone at Funston". The Junction City (Kansas) Weekly Union.
- McGrath, John J. (2004). The Brigade: A History, Its Organization and Employment in the US Army. DIANE Publishing. ISBN 9781428910225.
- Pencak, William (2009). Encyclopedia of the Veteran in America, Volume 1. ABC-CLIO. ISBN 9780313340086.
- Wilson, John B. (1987). Armies, Corps, Divisions, and Separate Brigades. Government Printing Office. ISBN 9780160869402.
