= Hoke Howell =

American film and television actor

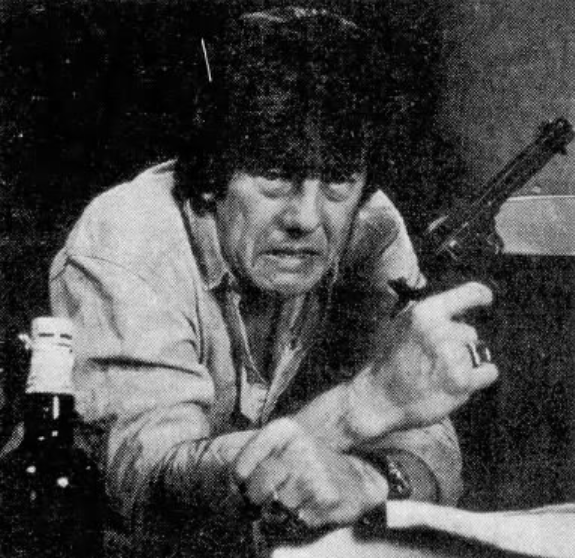
- Howell in 1979
- Born: John Hoke Howell Jr. August 27, 1929; Sumner, Georgia, U.S.
- Died: May 9, 1997 (aged 67); Burbank, California, U.S.
- Occupation(s): Film and television actor
- Spouse: Pat Stewart

John Hoke Howell Jr. (August 27, 1929 – May 9, 1997) was an American film and television actor. He was known for playing the recurring role of Ben Jenkins in the American western television series Here Come the Brides.

== Life and career ==
Howell was born in Sumner, Georgia, the son of John and Allene Howell. He served in the United States Navy. After his discharge, attended the American Academy of Dramatic Arts, graduating in 1956. He began his screen career in 1961, appearing in the film The Hustler. In the same year, he appeared in the film Splendor in the Grass, and made his television debut in the ABC situation comedy television series The Hathaways.

Later in his career, Howell guest-starred in numerous television programs including The Andy Griffith Show (as yokel Dud Wash), Gunsmoke, Columbo, The Rookies, McHale's Navy, The Jack Benny Program, Bonanza, The Dukes of Hazzard, Green Acres, Happy Days, The Virginian, Lost in Space and The Untouchables, and played the recurring role of Ben Jenkins in the ABC western television series Here Come the Brides. He also appeared in numerous films such as Framed, Shenandoah, Slaughter's Big Rip-Off, The Sidehackers, The Last of the Secret Agents?, Another 48 Hrs., Humanoids from the Deep and The Glove.

Howell retired from acting in 1997, last appearing in the film The Shooter.

== Death ==
Howell died on May 9, 1997, in Burbank, California, at the age of 67. He was buried at Forest Lawn Memorial Park.
