= Worth County High School =

Public high school in Sylvester, Georgia, United States

Location
- 406 W. King Street; Sylvester, Georgia 31791; United States; 31°32′52″N 83°50′30″W

Information
- School type: Public high school
- Denomination: Worth County School District
- Established: 1961
- Superintendent: Nehamiah Cummings
- Principal: Jared Worthy
- Teaching staff: 48.00 (on an FTE basis)
- Grades: 9–12
- Gender: Co-ed
- Student to teacher ratio: 18.02
- Colors: Gold and Black
- Mascot: Ram "Rambo"
- Team name: Rams
- Accreditation: Southern Association of Colleges and Schools
- Newspaper: The Ram
- Yearbook: The Ram
- Website: Worth County High School

Worth County High School (also known as Worth County Comprehensive High School or Worth County College and Career Academy) is a public high school located in Sylvester, Georgia, United States. The school is part of the Worth County School District, which serves Worth County.
