= Sumner High School and auditorium =

- Sumner High School
- U.S. National Register of Historic Places
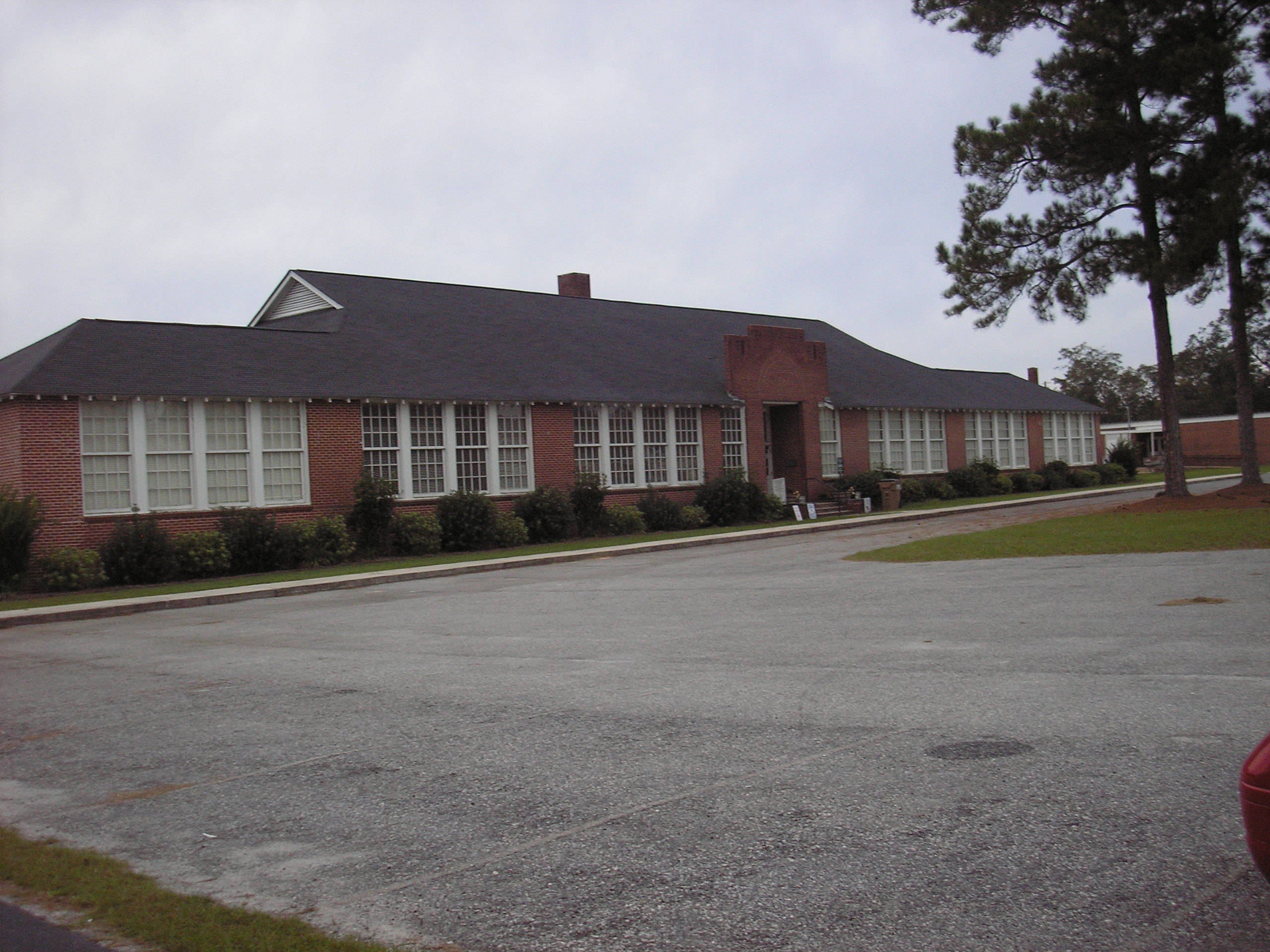

- Location within Georgia Location within the United States
- Location: 716 Walnut St., Sumner, Georgia
- Coordinates: 31°30′33″N 83°44′8″W
- Area: less than one acre
- Built: 1938
- Built by: Works Progress Administration
- NRHP reference No.: 96001035
- Added to NRHP: September 27, 1996

Sumner High School and Sumner Auditorium, now the Sumner Town Hall is a historic high school building and auditorium in Sumner, Georgia, Worth County, Georgia. It was added to the National Register of Historic Places on September 27, 1996. The buildings are located at 716 Walnut Street. The auditorium is used as Sumner's Town Hall. The old school building is used by Worth County.

== See also ==
- National Register of Historic Places listings in Worth County, Georgia
