= 1910 Michigan gubernatorial election =

- November 8, 1910
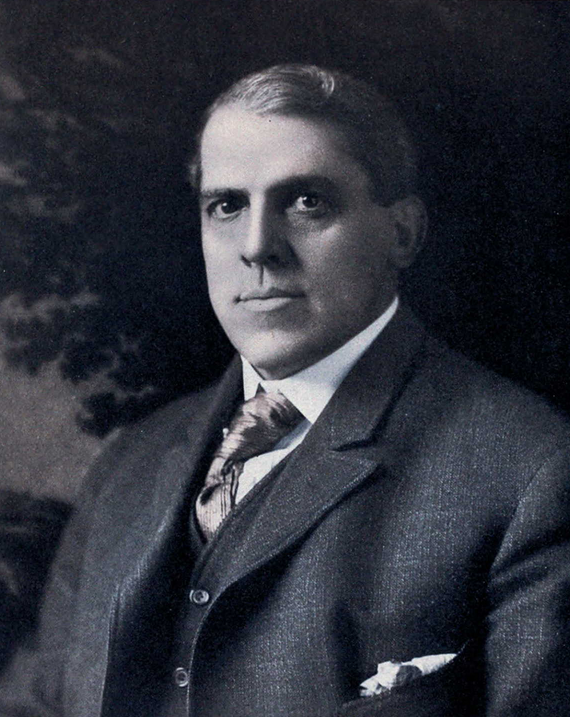

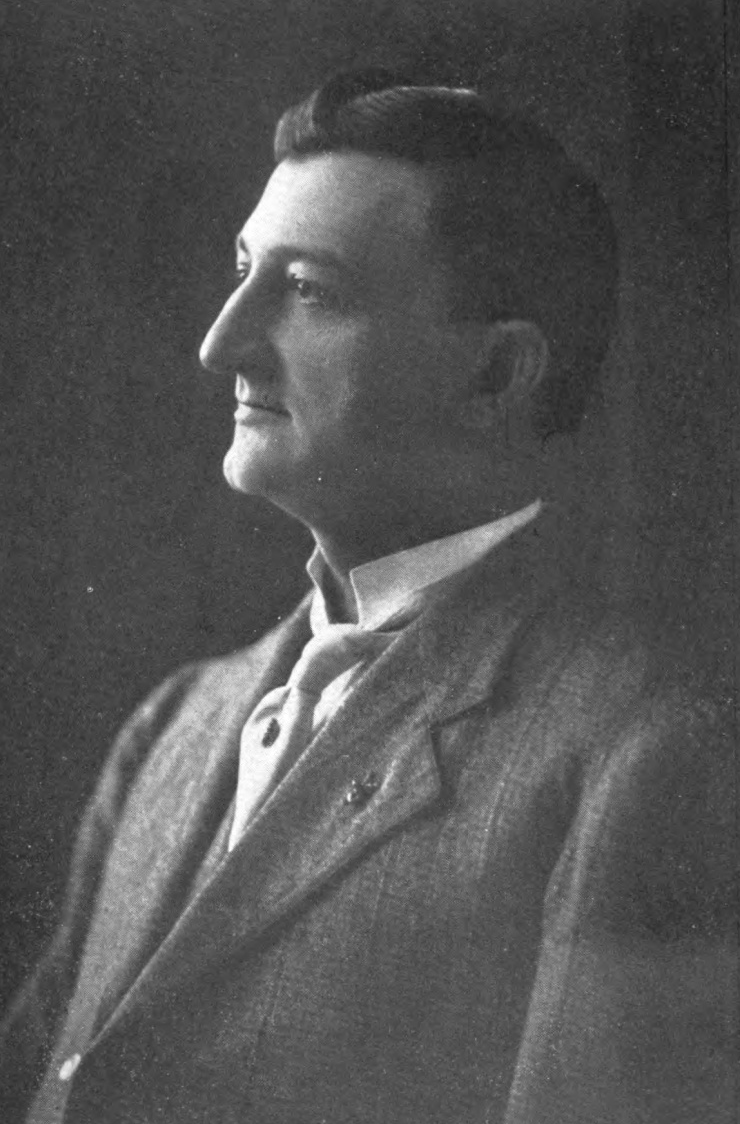
Nominee	Chase S. Osborn	Lawton T. Hemans
Party	Republican	Democratic
Popular vote	202,803	159,770
Percentage	52.85%	41.63%
- County results Osborn: 40–50% 50–60% 60–70% 70–80% 80–90% Hemans: 40–50% 50–60%
Governor before election
Fred M. Warner
Republican
Elected Governor
Chase S. Osborn
Republican

The 1910 Michigan gubernatorial election was held on November 8, 1910. Republican nominee Chase S. Osborn defeated Democratic candidate Lawton T. Hemans with 52.85% of the vote.

== Primary election ==
Michigan held primary elections for governor on September 6, 1910.

=== Republican party ===
Chase S. Osborn secured the Republican nomination over Patrick H. Kelley and Amos S. Musselman.

==== Candidates ====
- Patrick H. Kelley, Lieutenant Governor of Michigan
- Amos S. Musselman, businessman from Grand Rapids
- Chase S. Osborn, member of University of Michigan Board of Regents

==== Results ====
Republican primary results
Party	Candidate	Votes	%
Republican	Chase S. Osborn	88,270	46.14%
Republican	Patrick H. Kelley	52,337	27.35%
Republican	Amos S. Musselman	50,721	26.51%
Total votes		191,328	100.00%

=== Democratic party ===
Lawton T. Hemans was nominated without opposition for the second consecutive election.

==== Candidates ====
- Lawton T. Hemans, former member of Michigan House of Representatives

==== Results ====
Democratic primary results
Party	Candidate	Votes	%
Democratic	Lawton T. Hemans	22,304	100.00%
Total votes		22,304	100.00%

=== Minor parties ===
Prohibition primary results
Party	Candidate	Votes	%
Prohibition	Fred W. Corbett	1,723	100.00%
Total votes		1,723	100.00%

Socialist primary results
Party	Candidate	Votes	%
Socialist	Joseph Warnock	792	100.00%
Total votes		792	100.00%

== General election ==
=== Candidates ===
Major party candidates

- Chase S. Osborn, Republican
- Lawton T. Hemans, Democratic

Other candidates

- Joseph Warnock, Socialist
- Fred W. Corbett, Prohibition
- Herman Richter, Socialist Labor

=== Results ===
1910 Michigan gubernatorial election
Party	Candidate	Votes	%	±%
Republican	Chase S. Osborn	202,803	52.85%	+4.46%
Democratic	Lawton T. Hemans	159,770	41.63%	−4.99%
Socialist	Joseph Warnock	9,992	2.60%	+0.86%
Prohibition	Fred W. Corbett	9,989	2.60%	−0.37%
Socialist Labor	Herman Richter	1,204	0.31%	+0.16%
	Scattering	4	0.00%	
Majority		43,033	11.21%	
Total votes		383,762	100.00%	
Republican hold		Swing	+9.45%	

==== Results by county ====
This was the only election between 1884 and 1936 in which the winning candidate failed to carry Berrien County.

County	Chase S. Osborn Republican		Lawton T. Hemans Democratic		Joseph Warnock Socialist		Fred W. Corbett Prohibition		Herman Richter Socialist Labor		Margin		Total votes cast
County	#	%	#	%	#	%	#	%	#	%	#	%	Total votes cast
Alcona	537	76.39%	86	12.23%	58	8.25%	22	3.13%	0	0.00%	451	64.15%	703
Alger	485	69.38%	148	21.17%	35	5.01%	27	3.86%	4	0.57%	337	48.21%	699
Allegan	2,584	53.90%	1,981	41.32%	100	2.09%	117	2.44%	12	0.25%	603	12.58%	4,794
Alpena	1,348	67.06%	590	29.35%	52	2.59%	12	0.60%	7	0.35%	758	37.71%	2,010 (Note: Includes 1 Scattering vote)
Antrim	813	60.18%	423	31.31%	53	3.92%	59	4.37%	3	0.22%	390	28.87%	1,351
Arenac	729	54.53%	531	39.72%	41	3.07%	32	2.39%	4	0.30%	198	14.81%	1,337
Baraga	678	70.85%	239	24.97%	8	0.84%	29	3.03%	3	0.31%	439	45.87%	957
Barry	2,028	48.74%	1,947	46.79%	43	1.03%	129	3.10%	14	0.34%	81	1.95%	4,161
Bay	3,487	47.43%	3,433	46.69%	330	4.49%	87	1.18%	15	0.20%	54	0.73%	7,352
Benzie	590	54.48%	257	23.73%	98	9.05%	128	11.82%	10	0.92%	333	30.75%	1,083
Berrien	4,018	46.85%	4,051	47.24%	270	3.15%	206	2.40%	31	0.36%	-33	-0.38%	8,576
Branch	2,265	47.31%	2,360	49.29%	51	1.07%	105	2.19%	7	0.15%	-95	-1.98%	4,788
Calhoun	3,944	49.83%	3,581	45.24%	246	3.11%	111	1.40%	33	0.42%	363	4.59%	7,915
Cass	2,024	47.53%	2,005	47.09%	151	3.55%	73	1.71%	5	0.12%	19	0.45%	4,258
Charlevoix	1,330	62.06%	517	24.13%	200	9.33%	66	3.08%	30	1.40%	813	37.94%	2,143
Cheboygan	1,358	52.41%	1,112	42.92%	54	2.08%	62	2.39%	5	0.19%	246	9.49%	2,591
Chippewa	2,602	80.56%	513	15.88%	42	1.30%	72	2.23%	1	0.03%	2,089	64.67%	3,230
Clare	784	56.00%	563	40.21%	28	2.00%	20	1.43%	5	0.36%	221	15.79%	1,400
Clinton	2,172	48.54%	2,139	47.80%	28	0.63%	134	2.99%	2	0.04%	33	0.74%	4,475
Crawford	445	60.79%	259	35.38%	16	2.19%	11	1.50%	1	0.14%	186	25.41%	732
Delta	1,758	70.21%	630	25.16%	61	2.44%	38	1.52%	17	0.68%	1,128	45.05%	2,504
Dickinson	1,872	73.67%	495	19.48%	64	2.52%	71	2.79%	39	1.53%	1,377	54.19%	2,541
Eaton	2,826	42.65%	3,662	55.27%	41	0.62%	94	1.42%	2	0.03%	-836	-12.62%	6,626
Emmet	1,172	50.60%	746	32.21%	291	12.56%	102	4.40%	5	0.22%	426	18.39%	2,316
Genesee	3,789	49.20%	3,015	39.15%	493	6.40%	378	4.91%	27	0.35%	774	10.05%	7,702
Gladwin	812	67.39%	345	28.63%	22	1.83%	23	1.91%	3	0.25%	467	38.76%	1,205
Gogebic	1,460	54.36%	734	27.33%	61	2.27%	407	15.15%	24	0.89%	726	27.03%	2,686
Grand Traverse	1,007	50.99%	673	34.08%	228	11.54%	52	2.63%	15	0.76%	334	16.91%	1,975
Gratiot	2,357	51.75%	2,016	44.26%	23	0.50%	155	3.40%	4	0.09%	341	7.49%	4,555
Hillsdale	2,055	44.68%	2,369	51.51%	20	0.43%	152	3.31%	3	0.07%	-314	-6.83%	4,599
Houghton	5,677	65.58%	2,221	25.66%	242	2.80%	499	5.76%	17	0.20%	3,456	39.93%	8,656
Huron	2,195	61.01%	1,268	35.24%	36	1.00%	94	2.61%	5	0.14%	927	25.76%	3,598
Ingham	3,786	36.25%	6,130	57.80%	127	1.22%	364	3.49%	35	0.34%	-2,344	-22.45%	10,443
Ionia	2,894	44.61%	3,110	47.94%	40	0.62%	439	6.77%	4	0.06%	-216	-3.33%	6,487
Iosco	865	58.37%	579	39.07%	11	0.74%	27	1.82%	0	0.00%	286	19.30%	1,482
Iron	1,356	83.76%	189	11.67%	27	1.67%	36	2.22%	11	0.68%	1,167	72.08%	1,619
Isabella	1,961	49.68%	1,888	47.83%	40	1.01%	54	1.37%	4	0.10%	73	1.85%	3,947
Jackson	3,966	40.79%	5,427	55.82%	154	1.58%	166	1.71%	10	0.10%	-1,461	-15.03%	9,723
Kalamazoo	3,864	43.52%	4,169	46.95%	477	5.37%	346	3.90%	23	0.26%	-305	-3.44%	8,879
Kalkaska	433	53.99%	276	34.41%	51	6.36%	42	5.24%	0	0.00%	157	19.58%	802
Kent	9,228	48.50%	8,649	45.46%	685	3.60%	412	2.17%	52	0.27%	579	3.04%	19,026
Keweenaw	673	88.32%	53	6.96%	20	2.62%	15	1.97%	1	0.13%	620	81.36%	762
Lake	324	59.12%	184	33.58%	21	3.83%	17	3.10%	2	0.36%	140	25.55%	548
Lapeer	2,178	56.21%	1,491	38.48%	13	0.34%	189	4.88%	4	0.10%	687	17.73%	3,875
Leelanau	534	58.88%	304	33.52%	35	3.86%	24	2.65%	10	1.10%	230	25.36%	907
Lenawee	4,069	49.93%	3,891	47.75%	38	0.47%	144	1.77%	7	0.09%	178	2.18%	8,149
Livingston	2,183	44.63%	2,587	52.89%	6	0.12%	115	2.35%	0	0.00%	-404	-8.26%	4,891
Luce	239	81.57%	35	11.95%	1	0.34%	18	6.14%	0	0.00%	204	69.62%	293
Mackinac	847	59.19%	557	38.92%	11	0.77%	16	1.12%	0	0.00%	290	20.27%	1,431
Macomb	3,193	49.47%	3,099	48.02%	20	0.31%	137	2.12%	5	0.08%	94	1.46%	6,454
Manistee	1,468	37.85%	2,163	55.78%	179	4.62%	58	1.50%	10	0.26%	-695	-17.92%	3,878
Marquette	3,841	70.58%	1,001	18.39%	422	7.75%	166	3.05%	12	0.22%	2,840	52.19%	5,442
Mason	1,437	50.23%	1,310	45.79%	33	1.15%	70	2.45%	11	0.38%	127	4.44%	2,861
Mecosta	1,189	54.12%	828	37.69%	80	3.64%	93	4.23%	7	0.32%	361	16.43%	2,197
Menominee	2,095	62.09%	1,112	32.96%	104	3.08%	51	1.51%	12	0.36%	983	29.13%	3,374
Midland	1,321	61.90%	755	35.38%	25	1.17%	30	1.41%	3	0.14%	566	26.52%	2,134
Missaukee	1,043	70.76%	327	22.18%	49	3.32%	50	3.39%	5	0.34%	716	48.58%	1,474
Monroe	3,070	48.96%	3,050	48.64%	23	0.37%	120	1.91%	8	0.13%	20	0.32%	6,271
Montcalm	1,971	57.23%	1,150	33.39%	200	5.81%	105	3.05%	18	0.52%	821	23.84%	3,444
Montmorency	264	70.59%	95	25.40%	10	2.67%	4	1.07%	1	0.27%	169	45.19%	374
Muskegon	2,898	60.10%	1,554	32.23%	292	6.06%	56	1.16%	22	0.46%	1,344	27.87%	4,822
Newaygo	1,454	64.97%	669	29.89%	47	2.10%	68	3.04%	0	0.00%	785	35.08%	2,238
Oakland	4,448	48.09%	4,406	47.63%	93	1.01%	296	3.20%	6	0.06%	42	0.45%	9,250
Oceana	1,397	58.57%	839	35.18%	30	1.26%	113	4.74%	6	0.25%	558	23.40%	2,385
Ogemaw	731	58.43%	446	35.65%	38	3.04%	34	2.72%	2	0.16%	285	22.78%	1,251
Ontonagon	1,138	76.38%	265	17.79%	42	2.82%	38	2.55%	7	0.47%	873	58.59%	1,490
Osceola	1,036	55.76%	733	39.45%	28	1.51%	58	3.12%	3	0.16%	303	16.31%	1,858
Oscoda	221	78.65%	55	19.57%	1	0.36%	3	1.07%	1	0.36%	166	59.07%	281
Otsego	305	60.64%	179	35.59%	5	0.99%	13	2.58%	1	0.20%	126	25.05%	503
Ottawa	3,722	62.23%	2,056	34.38%	74	1.24%	111	1.86%	18	0.30%	1,666	27.85%	5,981
Presque Isle	966	80.97%	197	16.51%	17	1.42%	9	0.75%	4	0.34%	769	64.46%	1,193
Roscommon	296	59.56%	178	35.81%	13	2.62%	8	1.61%	2	0.40%	118	23.74%	497
Saginaw	6,411	51.56%	5,633	45.30%	262	2.11%	88	0.71%	41	0.33%	778	6.26%	12,435
Sanilac	3,654	71.66%	1,240	24.32%	34	0.67%	169	3.31%	2	0.04%	2,414	47.34%	5,099
Schoolcraft	622	83.16%	90	12.03%	23	3.07%	4	0.53%	9	1.20%	532	71.12%	748
Shiawassee	2,963	51.95%	2,270	39.80%	37	0.65%	385	6.75%	49	0.86%	693	12.15%	5,704
St. Clair	4,294	52.64%	3,385	41.50%	280	3.43%	145	1.78%	53	0.65%	909	11.14%	8,157
St. Joseph	2,378	49.18%	2,320	47.98%	71	1.47%	62	1.28%	4	0.08%	58	1.20%	4,835
Tuscola	2,750	64.40%	1,149	26.91%	26	0.61%	342	8.01%	3	0.07%	1,601	37.49%	4,270
Van Buren	2,589	55.97%	1,862	40.25%	82	1.77%	83	1.79%	10	0.22%	727	15.72%	4,626
Washtenaw	3,937	44.30%	4,690	52.77%	51	0.57%	184	2.07%	26	0.29%	-753	-8.47%	8,888
Wayne	31,910	52.92%	25,399	42.12%	1,989	3.30%	680	1.13%	317	0.53%	6,511	10.80%	60,295
Wexford	1,190	52.40%	837	36.86%	69	3.04%	165	7.27%	10	0.44%	353	15.54%	2,271
Total	202,803	52.85%	159,770	41.63%	9,992	2.60%	9,989	2.60%	1,204	0.31%	43,033	11.21%	383,672

===== Counties that flipped from Democratic to Republican =====
- Barry
- Calhoun
- Cass
- Clinton
- Gratiot
- Isabella
- Kent
- Lenawee
- Monroe
- Muskegon
- Saginaw
- Shiawassee
- St. Joseph

===== Counties that flipped from Republican to Democratic =====
- Berrien
