= Chase Osborn =

American politician (1860–1949)

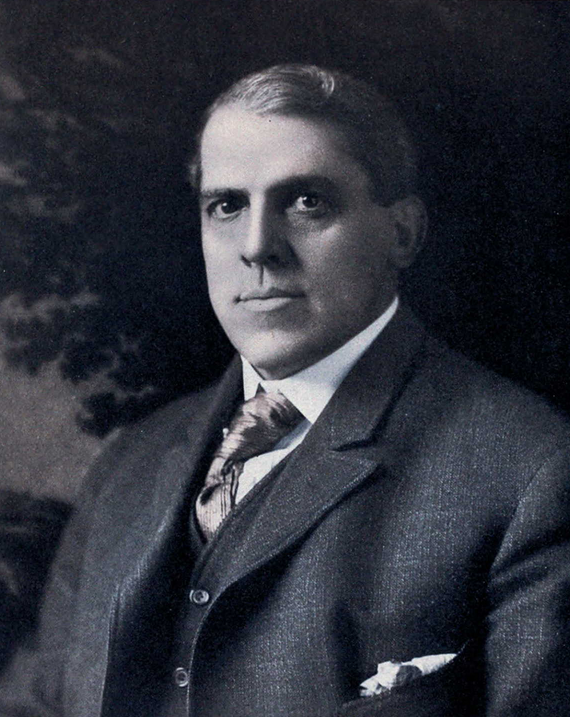
- Osborn from 1910 Michiganensian

27th Governor of Michigan
- In office January 2, 1911 – January 1, 1913
- Lieutenant: John Q. Ross
- Preceded by: Fred M. Warner
- Succeeded by: Woodbridge N. Ferris

Personal details
- Born: January 22, 1860 Huntington County, Indiana
- Died: April 11, 1949 (aged 89) Poulan, Georgia
- Party: Republican
- Spouse(s): Lillian G. Jones, Stellanova Brunt

Chase Salmon Osborn (January 22, 1860 – April 11, 1949) was an American politician, newspaper reporter and publisher, and explorer. He served as the 27th governor of Michigan from 1911 to 1913. The governor spent time at Possum Poke in Georgia, using it as a retreat and a place to write. He died there on April 11, 1949, aged 89.

== Early life in Indiana, Illinois and Wisconsin ==
Osborn was born in a log house in Huntington County, Indiana to George A. Osborn and Margaret (Fannon) Osborn, who named him Chase Salmon after abolitionist Salmon Chase, who became the next U.S. Secretary of the Treasury under Abraham Lincoln, and later Chief Justice of the Supreme Court. He was educated at Purdue University, where he became a member of the Sigma Chi fraternity, yet left before graduating. From there he moved to Chicago, Illinois, and briefly worked for the Chicago Tribune. On May 7, 1881, while a reporter for the Evening Wisconsin in Milwaukee, Wisconsin, he married Lillian G. Jones. They moved north, near the Michigan border, to Florence, Wisconsin, where he ran a local newspaper and prospected for iron.

== Life and politics in Michigan ==
Osborn later moved to Sault Ste. Marie, Michigan where he ran another newspaper, The Sault News, and also began his involvement in politics. In 1889, he was appointed Postmaster of Sault Ste. Marie and, in 1895, state Fish and Game Warden. In 1898, Governor Hazen S. Pingree appointed Osborn Commissioner of Railroads, a position in which he served from 1899 to 1903. After selling out his newspaper, he and Walter J. Hunsaker bought The Saginaw Courier Herald. In 1900, he was unsuccessful to win the Republican nomination for Governor of Michigan, losing to Aaron T. Bliss, who won the general election. In 1908, he served as a delegate to the Republican National Convention from Michigan to nominate William Howard Taft for U.S. president. That same year he became a member of the University of Michigan Board of Regents and served from 1908 to 1911.

In 1910, Osborn was elected the 27th Governor of Michigan and served from 1911 to 1913. His tenure as governor was focused on reforms as the state deficit was eliminated; a workmen's compensation bill was sanctioned; and a presidential primary law was authorized. In 1912, Osborn campaigned for Theodore Roosevelt for president to unseat the current President Taft. After Roosevelt lost the Republican nomination and bolted from the party to start the Progressive Party, Osborn still campaigned for him in Illinois, Missouri, and Oklahoma, yet not in Michigan. Osborn did not run for a second term and is to date the only governor of Michigan from the Upper Peninsula.

Governor Osborn at his desk in his office

After his term as governor, Osborn traveled the world and came back for another attempt to become governor again and unseat his successor, Democrat Woodbridge N. Ferris, but was unsuccessful. In 1918 he was a candidate in the primary for United States Senator from Michigan, being defeated by fellow Republican Truman H. Newberry. He supported Woodrow Wilson's League of Nations, and urged participation in world affairs during the 1920s and 1930s despite the consensus of isolationism during those years. Osborn met Stellanova Brunt in 1924, and she took a job as his researcher and secretary. In 1928, he was a candidate for the Republican nomination for U.S. vice president, yet was defeated by Charles Curtis, who later won with Herbert Hoover as president. In 1930, he was again a candidate in the primary for the U.S. Senate, being defeated by fellow Republican James Couzens. In 1931, Chase and Lillian Osborn legally adopted 37-year-old Stellanova, and she changed her last name to Osborn. In 1934, he was elected chairman of the Michigan Republican Party. In 1936, he was a candidate for Presidential Elector to elect Alfred Landon, who lost to Franklin Roosevelt. In 1939, he met with Roosevelt to lobby for construction of the Mackinac Bridge, a project that was completed in 1957 after the deaths of both Osborn and Roosevelt.

== Retirement, death, and legacy ==
After politics, Osborn returned to the newspaper business and became active in the pursuit of iron ore prospecting. He was a member of the Audubon Society, National Rifle Association of America, Sons of the American Revolution, Freemasons, Elks, Kiwanis, Knights of Pythias, Lions Club, Odd Fellows, Sigma Chi, and Sigma Delta Chi. He was also the author of several books.

Osborn used a wheelchair, and Stellanova became his full-time nurse. After his wife Lillian died, Stellanova's adoption was annulled. On April 9, 1949, at Osborn's Georgia residence, he at 89 and Stellanova at 54 were married. He died two weeks later at Possum Poke, his residence in Poulan, Georgia. He is interred at Duck Island, his Michigan residence on Sugar Island, near Sault Ste. Marie in the St. Marys River.

Osborn's book The Iron Hunter (1919; republished 2002) is autobiographical. The title refers to work he did prospecting for iron ore in Wisconsin and the Michigan Upper Peninsula and reflects his love of the outdoors. He wrote several other books and co-wrote some with his adopted daughter, Stellanova, who also wrote several books herself.

A portrait of Governor Osborn can be found in the collections of the Michigan State Capitol. Painted in 1931 by Robert Grafton, the painting is a naturalistic, half-length depiction of the man. The portrait is not currently on display, but more information can be found on the Capitol's website.

There is also an undated oil painting on canvas of Governor Osborn on display at the Bay Mills Community College Library and Heritage Center in Brimley, MI. The riverfront walk in downtown Sault Ste. Marie, Michigan features a historical monument and bust of Osborn. The Student Union at the Ann Arbor campus of the University of Michigan also holds a bust of Osborn on the first floor. The female freshman dormitory at Lake Superior State University in Sault Ste. Marie is named in honor of him.

== See also ==
- Possum Poke
- Honoring Governor Osborn / Preserve
- Governor Chase S. Osborn Website
- Portrait of Osborn in MI Capitol

== Sources ==
- Biodata from "Politicalgraveyard.com"
- Wayne State University Press publicity for republication of The Iron Hunter
- Shaul, Richard D. 2004. "To a Different Drum." Michigan History, September/October 2004
- U.S.S. Chase S. Osborn
- Chase Salmon Osborn and Stellanova Osborn website
- "Osborn, Chase Salmon," Men of progress: embracing biographical sketches of representative Michigan men; with an outline history of the state ... (The Evening News Association, Detroit, 1900), p. 131
- National Governors Association
- Bentley Historical Library
- Governor Osborn's home in Sault Ste. Marie, Michigan
- A Michigan Love Story by Stan J. Wooded
- Hunts' Guide to Michigan's Upper Peninsula, "Sault Ste. Marie, Michigan: Riverfront walk along Water Street and Brady Park"

Party political offices
Preceded by Fred M. Warner	Republican nominee for Governor of Michigan; 1910	Succeeded by Amos S. Musselman
Preceded by Amos S. Musselman	Republican nominee for Governor of Michigan; 1914	Succeeded by Albert Sleeper
Political offices
Preceded by Fred M. Warner	Governor of Michigan; 1911–1913	Succeeded by Woodbridge N. Ferris
