= Worth County Middle School =

Coordinates: 31.53479°N 83.83013°W

- 1305 N. Isabella St. Sylvester, Georgia 31791; United States

Information
- Type: Public
- School district: Worth County School District
- Grades: 6-8
- Website: WCMS homepage

Worth County Middle School is a public middle school located in Sylvester, Georgia, United States. The school has 105 staff/faculty members and more than 900 students in grades 6 to 8. Construction of the school began in 1990.

The principal is Paul Zimmer. When Zimmer took over as principal, WCMS was an NI-7 school, but has now made AYP for 3 consecutive years. The school's assistant principals are Cora Brettel, Pam Quimbley, and Steven Rouse. The department heads are Jim McMickin for mathematics, Lisa Underwood for language arts, Jennifer Easom for science, Amy Bozeman for social studies, and Katherine Labonte for connections.

Worth County Middle School's teams have the nickname Rams, just like Worth County High School. Trey Haynes, Jared Sherrard, and Will Knight coach football, and Haynes also coaches boys' basketball. Jimmy Hughes and Kelly McDougald coach baseball. Mitch Mitchell and Diane Dykes coach girls softball, and Tim Hathcock coaches girls' basketball. Mitchell also coaches boys' and girls' soccer.
