= Sylvester Commercial Historic District =

Historic district in Georgia, United States

- U.S. National Register of Historic Places
- U.S. Historic district
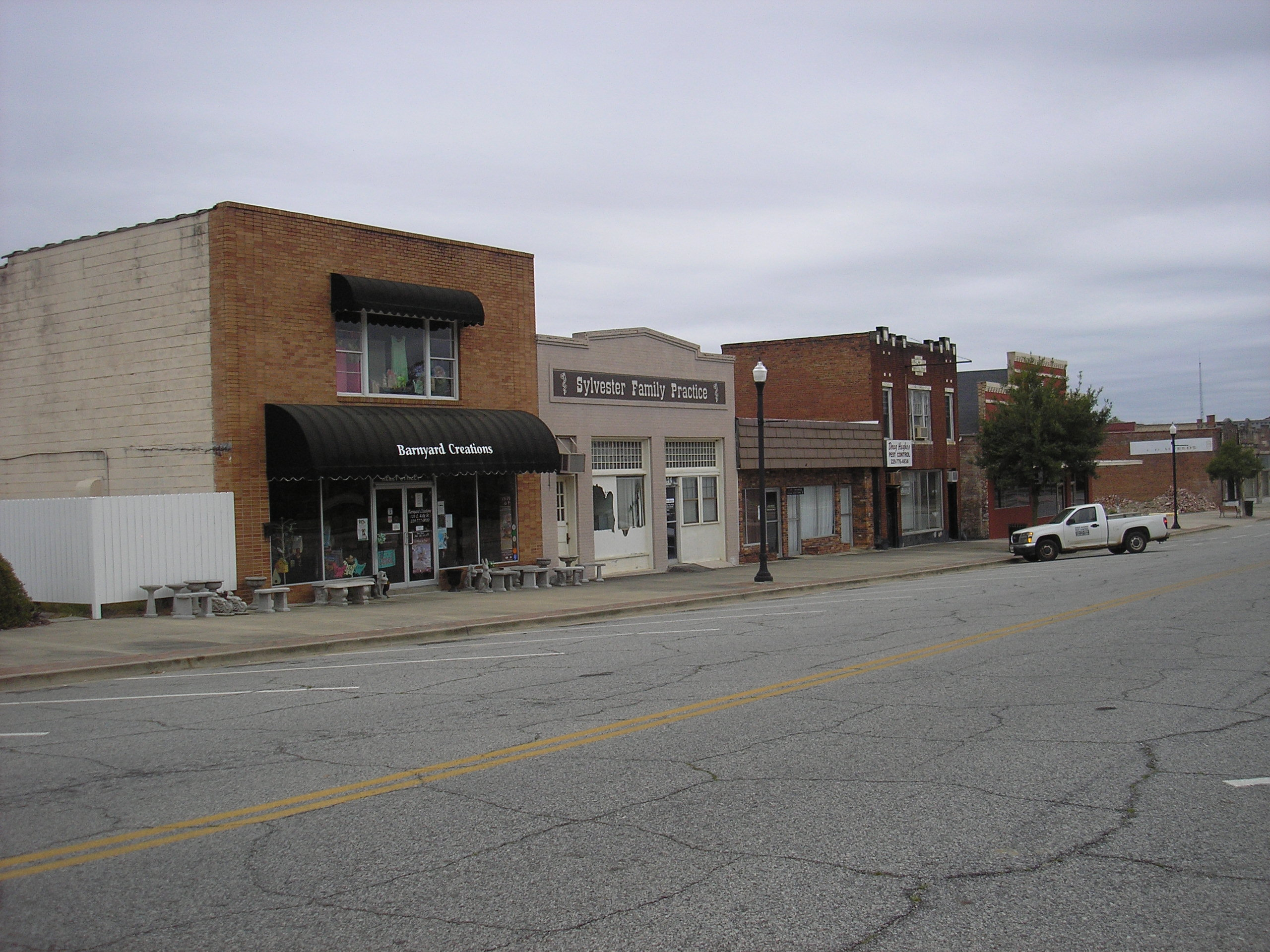

- Location within Georgia Location within the United States
- Location: Bounded by E. Kelly, N. Main, E. Front, and N. Isabella Sts., (original); Approx. the jct. of Main St. and Liberty St., (increase) Sylvester, Georgia
- Coordinates: 31°31′35″N 83°50′7″W
- Built: 1881 and 1898
- Architect: John M. Bullard
- Architectural style: Classical Revival, Beaux Arts, Victorian Commercial, Late 19th And 20th Century Revivals, Late 19th And Early 20th Century American Movements
- NRHP reference No.: 87001153 and 02000454

Significant dates
- Added to NRHP: July 9, 1987
- Boundary increase: May 9, 2002

Sylvester Commercial Historic District is a historic district in Sylvester, Georgia that was listed on the National Register of Historic Places (NRHP) in 1987. It includes the Worth County Local Building which is separately NRHP-listed. Its boundaries were increased in 2002 to include some federally owned property. The expanded district included 65 contributing buildings and 16 noncontributing buildings.

Prominent resources within the district include:

- Sylvester Banking Company (1910), which was Sylvester City Hall in 1987, 101 North Main Street. (see accompanying photo 13). It is a two-story granite Classical Revival style building, with Corinthian pilasters.
- First National Bank of Sylvester (c. 1915), which was WXZE Radio in 1987, 102 North Isabella Street (photo 8). Neoclassical, with a metal cornice.
- Alford Building (c. 1910), 115-119 North Main Street (photo 14). Largest historic commercial building in Sylvester. A Masonic Lodge once used the third floor of this three-story red brick Commercial Style building.
- Worth County Local Building (1911), 118 North Isabella Street (Photo 6), separately NRHP-listed. Originally a newspaper office, its architecture is a vernacular version of Beaux-Arts architecture.
- C.W. Hillhouse Building (1897), 125 E. Front Street (photo 12). Originally a hardware store. Asserted to be "the best local example of a late Victorian commercial building." It has hooded second-story windows and "an elaborate metal cornice".
- T.C. Jefford Block (1911-1924), 106-108-110-112 East Kelly Street (photo 2). It has four one-story commercial facades, two with original prism glass over their entrances.
- Sylvia Theater (1915), 118 East Kelly Street (photo 1). First movie theater in Sylvester. "It has a red brick facade with white marble geometric decorative patterns."
