= Sumner, Georgia =

- Town
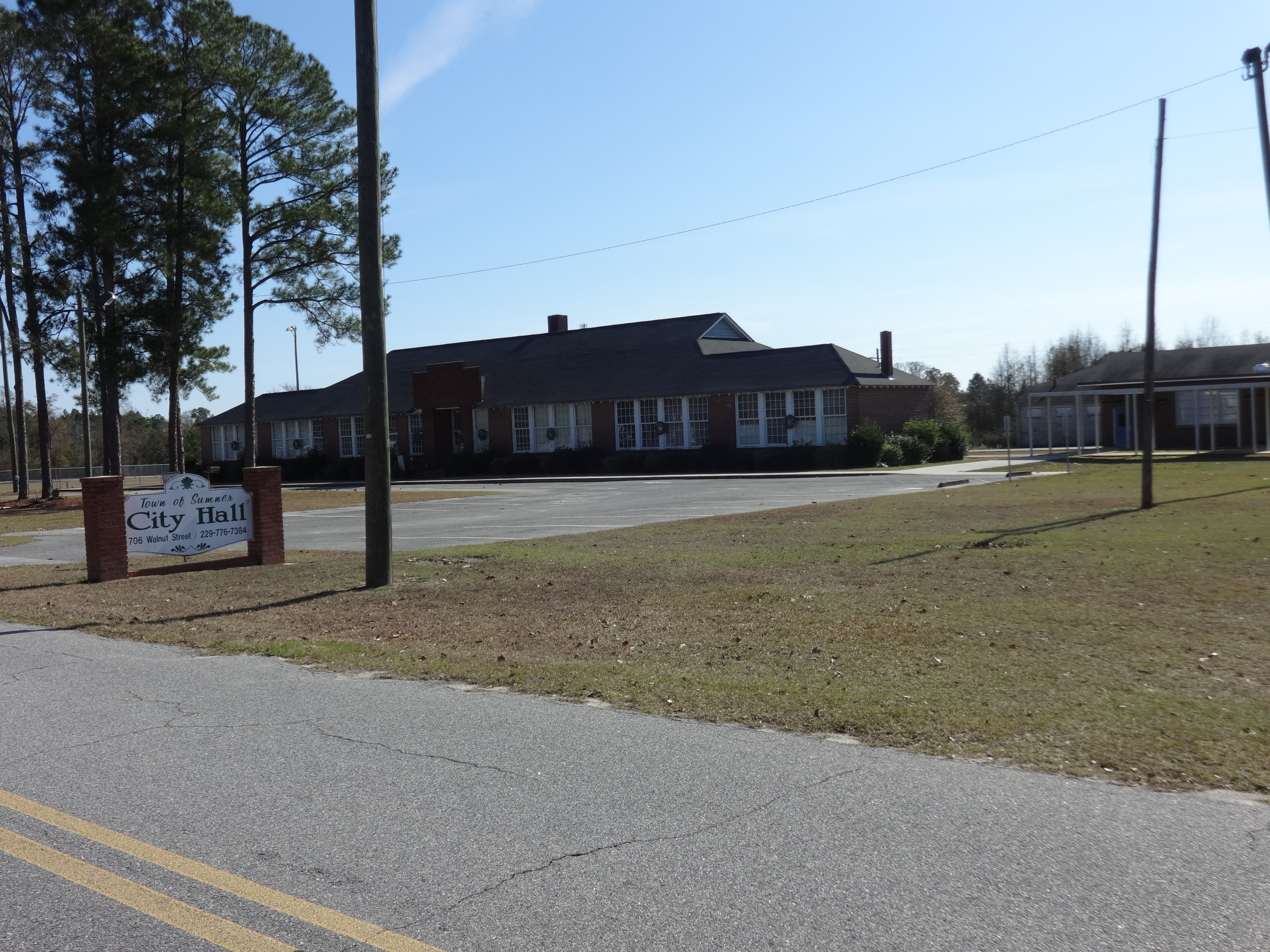
- Sumner City Hall

- Location in Worth County and the state of Georgia
- Coordinates: 31°30′40″N 83°44′18″W
- Country: United States
- State: Georgia
- County: Worth

Area
  - Total: 1.77 sq mi (4.59 km^{2})
  - Land: 1.77 sq mi (4.59 km^{2})
  - Water: 0 sq mi (0.00 km^{2})
- Elevation: 377 ft (115 m)

Population (2020)
  - Total: 445
  - Density: 251.2/sq mi (96.98/km^{2})
- Time zone: UTC-5 (Eastern (EST))
  - Summer (DST): UTC-4 (EDT)
- ZIP code: 31789
- Area code: 229
- FIPS code: 13-74432
- GNIS feature ID: 0356569
- Website: https://sumnerga.com/

Sumner is a town in Worth County, Georgia, United States. The population was 445 in 2020, up from 427 in 2010. It is part of the Albany, Georgia metropolitan statistical area. Sumner High School is listed on the National Register of Historic Places.

== Geography ==
Sumner is located at 31°30′40″N 83°44′18″W (31.510979, -83.738315). According to the United States Census Bureau, the town has a total area of 1.1 square miles (2.8 km^{2}), all land.

== History ==
The community was named after John C. "Jack" Sumner, the original owner of the town site. The Georgia General Assembly incorporated Sumner as a town in 1883.

== Demographics ==
Historical population
Census	Pop.	Note	%±
1900	333		—
1910	336		0.9%
1920	331		−1.5%
1930	332		0.3%
1940	340		2.4%
1950	226		−33.5%
1960	193		−14.6%
1970	207		7.3%
1980	213		2.9%
1990	209		−1.9%
2000	309		47.8%
2010	427		38.2%
2020	445		4.2%
U.S. Decennial Census; 1850-1870 1870-1880; 1890-1910 1920-1930; 1940 1950 1960; 1970 1980 1990; 2000 2010

=== Racial and ethnic composition ===
Sumner town, Georgia – Racial and ethnic composition Note: the US Census treats Hispanic/Latino as an ethnic category. This table excludes Latinos from the racial categories and assigns them to a separate category. Hispanics/Latinos may be of any race.
Race / Ethnicity (NH = Non-Hispanic)	Pop 2000	Pop 2010	Pop 2020	% 2000	% 2010	% 2020
White alone (NH)	259	310	295	83.82%	72.60%	66.29%
Black or African American alone (NH)	46	103	103	14.89%	24.12%	23.15%
Native American or Alaska Native alone (NH)	3	0	3	0.97%	0.00%	0.67%
Asian alone (NH)	0	0	1	0.00%	0.00%	0.22%
Native Hawaiian or Pacific Islander alone (NH)	0	0	0	0.00%	0.00%	0.00%
Other race alone (NH)	0	0	0	0.00%	0.00%	0.00%
Mixed race or Multiracial (NH)	1	6	32	0.32%	1.41%	7.19%
Hispanic or Latino (any race)	0	8	11	0.00%	1.87%	2.47%
Total	309	427	445	100.00%	100.00%	100.00%

=== 2000 census ===
As of the census of 2000, there were 309 people, 110 households, and 87 families residing in the town. By 2020, its population grew to 445.

== Notable people ==
- Hoke Howell (1929–1997), actor who was known for playing the recurring role of Ben Jenkins in the ABC western television series Here Come the Brides
