= Poulan, Georgia =

Poulan
- City
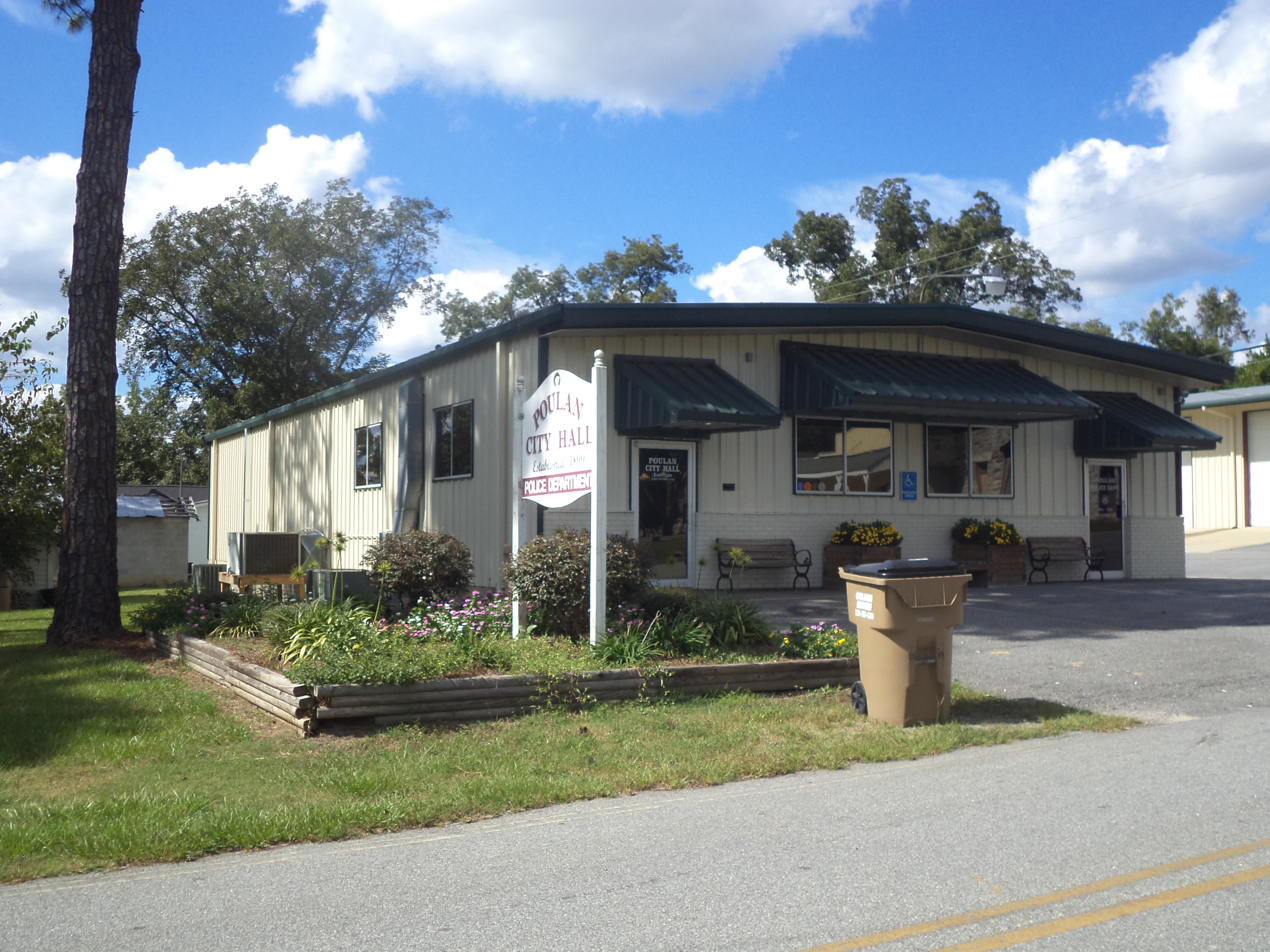
- Poulan City Hall and Police Station

- Location in Worth County and the state of Georgia
- Coordinates: 31°30′49″N 83°47′28″W
- Country: United States
- State: Georgia
- County: Worth

Government
  - Mayor: Robert Greer

Area
  - Total: 1.67 sq mi (4.33 km^{2})
  - Land: 1.67 sq mi (4.33 km^{2})
  - Water: 0 sq mi (0.00 km^{2})
- Elevation: 381 ft (116 m)

Population (2020)
  - Total: 760
  - Density: 454.2/sq mi (175.36/km^{2})
- Time zone: UTC-5 (Eastern (EST))
  - Summer (DST): UTC-4 (EDT)
- ZIP code: 31781
- Area code: 229
- FIPS code: 13-62496
- GNIS feature ID: 0321100
- Website: www.cityofpoulan.com

Poulan is a city in Worth County, Georgia, United States. The population was 709 in 2026. Poulan is part of the Albany, Georgia metropolitan area.

Poulan is notable for its police department's speed trap tactics from 2006 to 2024, and reported criminal activity by city and police leadership.

== History ==
The Georgia General Assembly incorporated Poulan as a town in 1889. The city was named for Judge W. A. Poulan. The remnants of what was once a bank and pharmacy are still standing on Broad Street. Poulan is also home to the only two historical registered properties in Worth County; the Poulan Library and Possum Poke. Poulan was settled in 1877 along the Brunswick and Albany railroad.

== Controversy ==
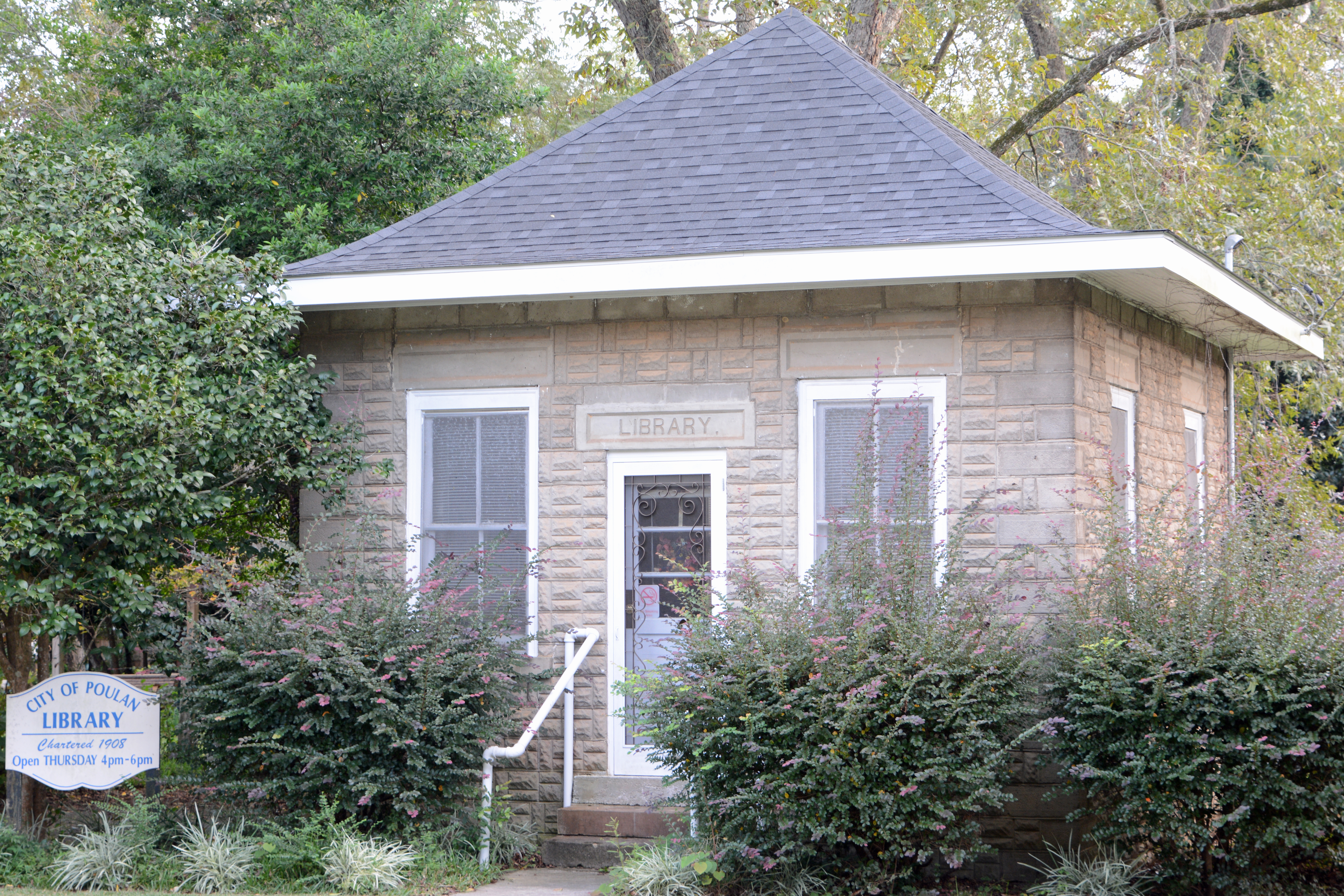
Library, on the National Register of Historic Places

In December 2007, then Police Chief Angie Schlosser, was fired from the Poulan Police Department after the city claimed she had performed an illegal background investigation into a city council member. Schlosser was never charged with a crime, and no outside investigation was conducted.

In September 2012, then Poulan Mayor, Dustin Grubbs, was arrested in Dougherty County and charged with felony possession of various narcotic prescription pills including oxycodone, oxycontin, and two different mixtures of Vicodin in different dosages. Grubbs remained the Mayor of Poulan until his death in October 2020.

In August 2017, Rosemary Jones, a police officer employed by Poulan Police, was arrested and charged by the Georgia Bureau of Investigation with two counts of felony cruelty to children in the first degree, two counts of aggravated assault, and one count of felony false imprisonment. She was retained by the Poulan Police Department, and promoted to Major.

In April 2022, officers reported their own findings of corruption by the Police Chief, Larry Whisenant, including theft, firearms violations, and falsified reports to both the Georgia Bureau of Investigation and the Tift Judicial Circuit District Attorney's Office. Both officers were terminated after they reported their evidence and investigation.

The Poulan Police Department has been featured in numerous articles by investigative journalists, most notably for its speed trap tactics and criminal activity since 2009. In 2009, Poulan's small police force generated nearly $900,000 from fines and fees, a number comparable to a city 30 times its size and due to the charges and fees being more than most cities. The per capita revenue from fines and fees is $1,019.15. Larry Whisenant, the current Poulan Police Chief has never been investigated or prosecuted, despite multiple former officers and investigative journalists detailing incidents of criminal activity. The City of Poulan posted a photo on their website showcasing the relationship that Larry Whisenant has with the Georgia Governor's Office, specifically GA Governor Brian Kemp.

== Speed trap ==
The city attorney; former Albany, Georgia mayor Tommy Coleman has repeatedly defended the enforcement tactics, as well as the Worth County Sheriff and Warwick Police Departments. Worth County officials (including a member of the County Commission) and City of Poulan officials, admitted that Poulan required the revenue from speed-related citations because their tax base was so small.

Between 2008 and 2012, Poulan is estimated to have received $1,676,402.80 (a per-capita amount of $2,012.49) from their Police Department's tactics inside the Poulan city limits on U.S. Route 82 (GA State Route 520). Residents of Poulan have publicly voiced their concern over their police department's tactics multiple times with department leadership specifically denying quotas for summons and citations for traffic related offenses.

== COVID-19 ==
During the COVID-19 epidemic, Worth County Sheriff Don Whitaker deputized members of the Poulan Police Department so that county ordinances specifically related to COVID-19 regulations could be enforced by Poulan Police Officers inside the city limits of Poulan.

== Geography ==
Poulan is located at 31°30′49″N 83°47′28″W (31.513739, -83.791041). According to the United States Census Bureau, the city has a total area of 1.7 square miles (4.3 km^{2}), all land.

== Demographics ==
Historical population
Census	Pop.	Note	%±
1900	474		—
1910	652		37.6%
1920	586		−10.1%
1930	611		4.3%
1940	670		9.7%
1950	750		11.9%
1960	736		−1.9%
1970	766		4.1%
1980	818		6.8%
1990	962		17.6%
2000	946		−1.7%
2010	851		−10.0%
2020	760		−10.7%
U.S. Decennial Census; 1850-1870 1870-1880; 1890-1910 1920-1930; 1940 1950 1960; 1970 1980 1990; 2000 2010

=== Racial and ethnic composition ===
Poulan city, Georgia – Racial and ethnic composition Note: the US Census treats Hispanic/Latino as an ethnic category. This table excludes Latinos from the racial categories and assigns them to a separate category. Hispanics/Latinos may be of any race.
Race / Ethnicity (NH = Non-Hispanic)	Pop 2000	Pop 2010	Pop 2020	% 2000	% 2010	% 2020
White alone (NH)	720	647	549	76.11%	76.03%	72.24%
Black or African American alone (NH)	208	182	148	21.99%	21.39%	19.47%
Native American or Alaska Native alone (NH)	4	3	1	0.42%	0.35%	0.13%
Asian alone (NH)	1	2	3	0.11%	0.24%	0.39%
Native Hawaiian or Pacific Islander alone (NH)	0	0	0	0.00%	0.00%	0.00%
Other race alone (NH)	0	0	6	0.00%	0.00%	0.79%
Mixed race or Multiracial (NH)	6	11	39	0.63%	1.29%	5.13%
Hispanic or Latino (any race)	7	6	14	0.74%	0.71%	1.84%
Total	946	851	760	100.00%	100.00%	100.00%

=== 2000 census ===
As of the census of 2000, there were 946 people, 365 households, and 273 families residing in the city. By 2020, its population declined to 760. By 2026, is population declined to 709.

== Notable people ==
- Howell Heflin (1921–2005), politician
- Chase Osborn (1860–1949), politician
