= Sylvester, Georgia =

- City
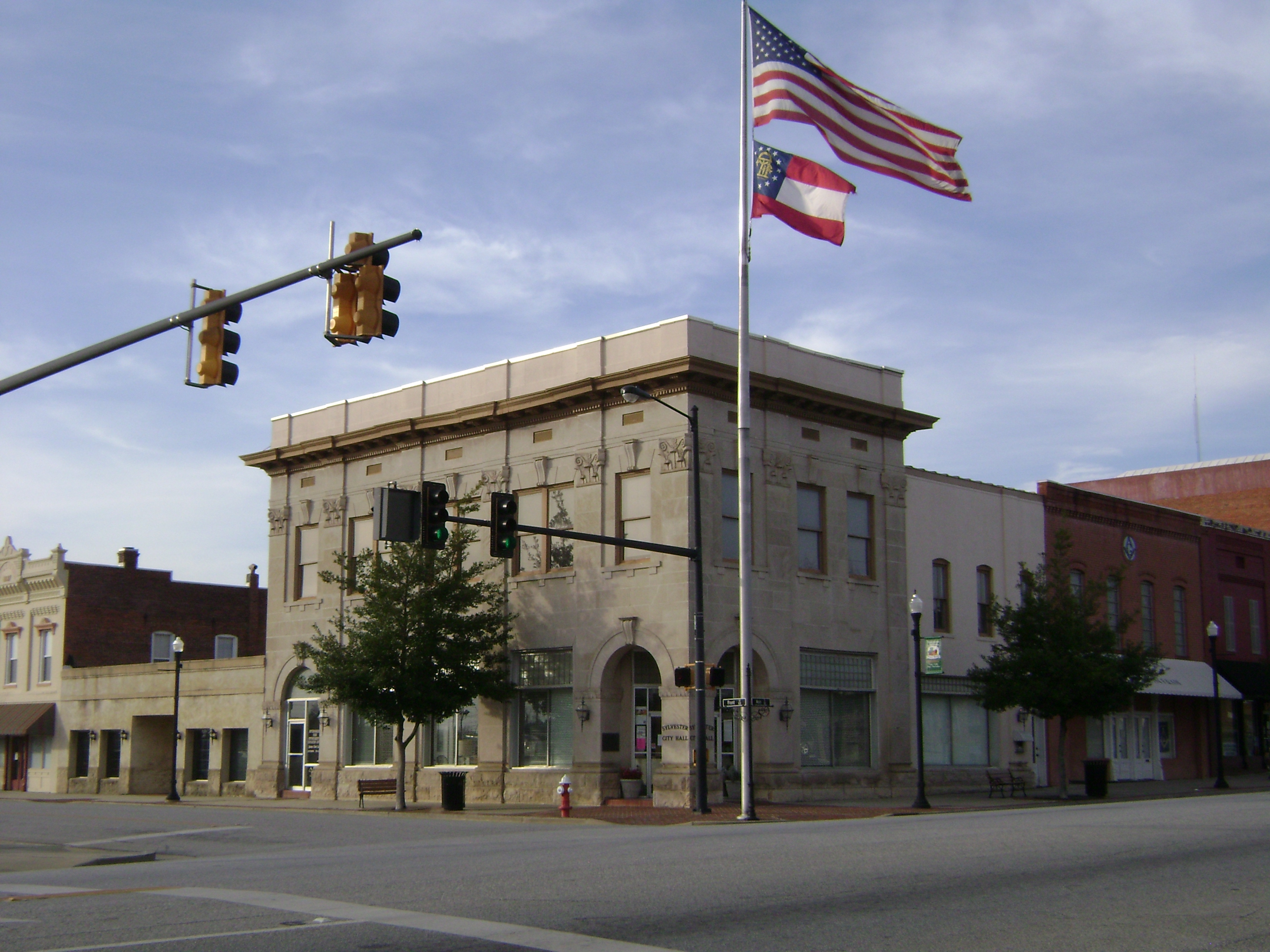
- Sylvester City Hall

- Flag Seal Logo
- Nickname
- Motto: "Small Town. Big Heart."
- Location in Worth County and the state of Georgia
- Coordinates: 31°31′53″N 83°50′10″W
- Country: United States
- State: Georgia
- County: Worth
- Settled: 1893
- Incorporated (City): December 21st, 1898

Area
  - Total: 6.60 sq mi (17.09 km^{2})
  - Land: 6.56 sq mi (16.99 km^{2})
  - Water: 0.039 sq mi (0.10 km^{2})
- Elevation: 387 ft (118 m)

Population (2020)
  - Total: 5,644
  - Density: 860.4/sq mi (332.21/km^{2})
- Time zone: UTC-5 (Eastern (EST))
  - Summer (DST): UTC-4 (EDT)
- ZIP code: 31791
- Area code: 229
- FIPS code: 13-75188
- GNIS feature ID: 0356576
- Website: cityofsylvester.com

Sylvester is the county seat of Worth County, Georgia, United States. The population was 5,644 in 2020. The city is the county seat and business center of Worth County and is claimed to be the Peanut Capital of the World due to its peanut production.

== History ==
Sylvester was platted in 1893. The Georgia General Assembly incorporated Sylvester as a town in 1898.

== Geography ==
Sylvester is located at 31°31′53″N 83°50′10″W (31.531425, -83.836233). According to the United States Census Bureau, the city has a total area of 5.7 square miles (15 km^{2}), of which 5.7 square miles (15 km^{2}) is land and 0.04 square miles (0.10 km^{2}) (0.52%) is water.

Sylvester is located on U.S. Highway 82 at the junction of Georgia State Route 33. Georgia State Route 256 enters into southeast Sylvester, where it is co-designated Martin Luther King Jr. Drive.

== Demographics ==
Historical population
Census	Pop.	Note	%±
1900	552		—
1910	1,447		162.1%
1920	1,547		6.9%
1930	1,984		28.2%
1940	2,191		10.4%
1950	2,623		19.7%
1960	3,610		37.6%
1970	4,226		17.1%
1980	5,860		38.7%
1990	5,702		−2.7%
2000	5,990		5.1%
2010	6,188		3.3%
2020	5,644		−8.8%
U.S. Decennial Census; 1850-1870 1870-1880; 1890-1910 1920-1930; 1940 1950 1960; 1970 1980 1990; 2000 2010

=== Racial and ethnic composition ===
Sylvester city, Georgia – Racial and ethnic composition Note: the US Census treats Hispanic/Latino as an ethnic category. This table excludes Latinos from the racial categories and assigns them to a separate category. Hispanics/Latinos may be of any race.
Race / Ethnicity (NH = Non-Hispanic)	Pop 2000	Pop 2010	Pop 2020	% 2000	% 2010	% 2020
White alone (NH)	2,328	2,349	2,023	38.86%	37.96%	35.84%
Black or African American alone (NH)	3,583	3,669	3,342	59.82%	59.29%	59.21%
Native American or Alaska Native alone (NH)	6	3	6	0.10%	0.05%	0.11%
Asian alone (NH)	7	36	47	0.12%	0.58%	0.83%
Native Hawaiian or Pacific Islander alone (NH)	1	2	6	0.02%	0.03%	0.11%
Other race alone (NH)	0	3	16	0.00%	0.05%	0.28%
Mixed race or Multiracial (NH)	11	61	113	0.18%	0.99%	2.00%
Hispanic or Latino (any race)	54	65	91	0.90%	1.05%	1.61%
Total	5,990	6,188	5,644	100.00%	100.00%	100.00%

=== 2020 census ===
As of the 2020 census, Sylvester had a population of 5,644. The median age was 37.3 years. 25.7% of residents were under the age of 18 and 17.7% of residents were 65 years of age or older. For every 100 females there were 79.3 males, and for every 100 females age 18 and over there were 75.9 males age 18 and over.

95.8% of residents lived in urban areas, while 4.2% lived in rural areas.

There were 2,182 households in Sylvester, of which 34.2% had children under the age of 18 living in them. Of all households, 30.5% were married-couple households, 17.2% were households with a male householder and no spouse or partner present, and 45.7% were households with a female householder and no spouse or partner present. About 30.0% of all households were made up of individuals and 14.5% had someone living alone who was 65 years of age or older. There were 1,709 families residing in the city.

There were 2,459 housing units, of which 11.3% were vacant. The homeowner vacancy rate was 1.8% and the rental vacancy rate was 8.5%.

Sylvester racial composition as of 2020
Race	Num.	Perc.
White (non-Hispanic)	2,023	35.84%
Black or African American (non-Hispanic)	3,342	59.21%
Native American	6	0.11%
Asian	47	0.83%
Pacific Islander	6	0.11%
Other/Mixed	129	2.29%

== Education ==
The Worth County School District holds pre-school to grade twelve, and consists of two elementary schools, a middle school, and a high school. The district has 296 full-time teachers and over 4,354 students.

- Worth County Elementary School
- Worth County Primary School
- Worth County Middle School
- Worth County High School
- Caleb's Christian Academy K-12

== Notable people ==
- Marion Butts - NFL running back who played for the San Diego Chargers, New England Patriots, and Houston Oilers; born in Sylvester.
- Rickey Claitt - NFL running back who played for the Washington Redskins; born in Sylvester.
- Meshak Williams - NFL defensive end who played for the Baltimore Ravens; born in Sylvester.
- Mary Hood - award-winning author of How Far She Went, And Venus Is Blue and Familiar Heat. Graduated from Worth County High School.
- Ray Jenkins - Newspaper editor and deputy press secretary to President Jimmy Carter; born in Sylvester.
- Daniel Mack - WWI black veteran lynched in town, but survived by playing dead.
- Sue Monk Kidd - author of the New York Times bestseller, The Secret Life of Bees and The Mermaid Chair. Born in Sylvester.
- Frank Park - Congressman (1913–1935)
- Bob Sikes - U.S. Representative for Florida, born in Isabella.
- Sonny Skinner - PGA golf pro.
- Michael Carter - Musician, Songwriter, Producer (Lead guitarist for Luke Bryan), graduated from Worth County High School.
