= Georgia State Route 39 =

State highway in Georgia, United States

State Route 39
- SR 39; mainline in red, connector routes in blue

Route information
- Maintained by GDOT
- Length: 118 mi (190 km)

Major junctions
- South end: Lake Seminole in southern Seminole County
- US 84 / SR 38 / SR 91 / SR 91 Alt. in Donalsonville; US 27 Bus. / SR 1 Bus. / SR 62 / SR 62 Byp. in Blakely; US 82 / SR 27 / SR 50 in Georgetown
- North end: US 27 / SR 1 near Louvale

Location
- Country: United States
- State: Georgia
- Counties: Seminole, Miller, Early, Clay, Quitman, Stewart

Highway system
- Georgia State Highway System; Interstate; US; State; Special
← SR 38	→ SR 40
← SR 374	SR 375	→ SR 376

State Route 39 (SR 39) is a 118-mile-long (190 km) state highway that travels south-to-north through portions of Seminole, Miller, Early, Clay, Quitman, and Stewart counties in the southwestern part of the U.S. state of Georgia. The route proceeds north from its southern terminus along the shore of Lake Seminole in southern Seminole County to a point just southwest of Omaha. From Lake Seminole to Omaha, its route parallels the course of the Chattahoochee River, but in Omaha the route turns to an easterly direction until it meets its northern terminus, an intersection with US 27/SR 1 in a rural south of the unincorporated community of Louvale.

SR 39 passes through several historic districts and landmarks, including the Blakely Historic District and the Fort Gaines Historic District. These areas are part of the Georgia Historic Preservation Division.

== Route description ==
=== Seminole and Miller counties ===
SR 39 begins at a parking lot for a boat ramp along the shore of Lake Seminole, south of Seminole State Park in southern Seminole County. SR 39 travels northwest and west onto Mildred Cummings Road. It then turns to the north and skirts along the western edge of the park, intersecting SR 253 (Bainbridge Highway) on its northwestern corner. The route continues to the north, intersecting the northern terminus of SR 374. Approaching Donalsonville from the south, it skirts along the western edge of the Donalsonville Country Club, intersects SR 285, passes the Donalsonville Municipal Airport and Seminole County Middle/High School. In Donalsonville proper, adjacent to Davis Park, is an intersection with SR 91 (Marianna Highway). The two highways begin a concurrency through town. About five blocks to the north is an intersection with US 84/SR 38 (3rd Street). Less than 500 feet (150 m) after crossing over a CSX railway line, the two routes diverge, with SR 39 heading northwest on West Crawford Street. Before leaving town, it curves to a more north-northwestern routing. Approximately 1.5 miles (2.4 km) later, it enters Miller County and straddles the Early-Miller County line. About 1 mile (1.6 km) north-northwest of the county line, SR 39 curves to a due north routing. Farther to the north, at the intersection with Moulton Road and Shingler Road, the highway heads to the west and enters Early County.

=== Early County ===
SR 39 resumes its northward routing just northwest of Killarney. In Jones Crossroads is an intersection with SR 273 (Papermill Highway).. After curving to the north-northeast, the route enters Lucile, where it has a short segment on the Early–Miller county line. After it re-emerges into Early County, it enters Blakely. In Blakely, SR 39 passes southwest of the Town & Country Golf Course and turns right onto Cedar Springs Road (part of former SR 363). One block later, it intersects US 27 Business/SR 1 Business (South Main Street). The three highways travel concurrently to the north through downtown. On the way, they pass east of Blakely Cemetery and intersect SR 62 (Columbia Street), which joins the concurrency. The four highways travel around the city square, with SR 62 departing the concurrency on the east side of the square. US 27 Business/SR 1 Business/SR 39 continue to the north. At the intersection with SR 62 Bypass (Martin Luther King Jr. Boulevard), SR 39 turns left and travels concurrent with SR 62 Bypass into the northwestern part of the city. At the intersection with Fort Gaines Street, SR 39 departs to the northwest and leaves the city. Just before Grimsley Mills Road, it curves to the north-northwest, and after Singletary Road, it curves back to the northwest. Just before leaving the county, SR 39 curves to a nearly due north routing. A short distance later, the road enters Clay County.

=== Clay, Quitman, and Stewart counties ===
SR 39 continues to the north, and curves to the northwest, before entering Fort Gaines, where it curves to a northward routing and is briefly concurrent with SR 37. North of Fort Gaines, SR 39 intersects the western terminus of SR 266 (Coleman Road) and runs along the eastern shore of Walter F. George Lake, and passes just east of George T. Bagby State Park. It curves to the northwest and crosses over Pataula Creek and passes northeast of Pataula Creek Park. SR 39 curves back to the north and enters Quitman County. It curves to the north-northeast and intersects US 82/SR 50. The three highways travel concurrently to the northwest into Georgetown. In town is an intersection with the southern terminus of SR 27. At this intersection, SR 27/SR 39 travel to the northeast. Then, SR 39 departs to the north-northeast, running parallel to the Chattahoochee River and entering Stewart County. After curving to a nearly due north routing, the route intersects the western terminus of SR 39 Connector just south of Florence Marina State Park. SR 39 begins a gradual curve to the north-northeast. Just southwest of Omaha, the route intersects the eastern terminus of SR 39 Spur and makes a nearly 90-degree turn to the east. It passes through Omaha and continues to the east. After crossing over a CSX railway line, it continues to the east until it meets its northern terminus, an intersection with US 27/SR 1 in a rural area south of the unincorporated community of Louvale.

=== National Highway System ===
The following portions of SR 39 that is included as part of the National Highway System, a system of routes determined to be the most important for the nation's economy, mobility, and defense

- From the southern end of the US 27 Bus./SR 1 Bus. to the northern end of the SR 62 Byp. cconcurrency in Blakely.
- The brief concurrency with US 82/SR 50 from a point southeast of Georgetown to the central part of the city

== History ==
The portion of SR 39 north of Georgetown was formerly SR 375. However, it was renumbered as an extension of SR 39 after just a few months.

== Major intersections ==
County	Location	mi	km	Destinations	Notes
Seminole	Lake Seminole	0.0	0.0	Southern terminus	
Seminole	Seminole State Park	2.4	3.9	SR 253 – Fairchild, Bainbridge	
Seminole		10.5	16.9	SR 374 south – Donalsonville	Northern terminus of SR 374
Seminole		14.0	22.5	SR 285 (Bartow–Gibson Highway) – Steam Mill, Brinson	
Seminole	Donalsonville	17.7	28.5	SR 91 south (Marianna Highway) – Malone	Southern end of SR 91 concurrency
Seminole	Donalsonville	18.3	29.5	US 84 / SR 38 (3rd Street)	
Seminole	Donalsonville	18.5	29.8	SR 91 north (North Tennille Avenue) – Colquitt	Northern end of SR 91 concurrency
Seminole	Donalsonville	18.7	30.1	SR 91 Alt. (Wiley Avenue)	
Miller	No major junctions				
Early	Jones Crossroads	29.5	47.5	SR 273 (Papermill Highway) – Cedar Springs, Colquitt	
Miller	No major junctions				
Early	Blakely	43.5	70.0	US 27 Bus. south / SR 1 Bus. south (South Main Street)	Southern end of US 27 Bus./SR 1 Bus. concurrency
Early	Blakely	44.1	71.0	SR 62 west (Columbia Road) – Columbia	Southern end of SR 62 concurrency
Early	Blakely	44.3	71.3	SR 62 east (Magnolia Street) – Arlington, Leary, Pretoria, Albany	Northern end of SR 62 concurrency; at the eastern edge of town square, on one-way street
Early	Blakely	44.4	71.5	SR 62 west (Main Street)	Northern end of SR 62 concurrency; at the northern edge of town square, on one-way street
Early	Blakely	45.3	72.9	US 27 Bus. north / SR 1 Bus. north (North Main Street) / SR 62 Byp. east (Martin Luther King Jr. Boulevard)	Northern end of US 27 Bus./SR 1 Bus. concurrency; southern end of SR 62 Byp. concurrency
Early	Blakely	45.9	73.9	SR 62 Byp. west (Martin Luther King Jr. Boulevard)	Northern end of SR 62 Byp. concurrency
Clay	Fort Gaines	63.4	102.0	SR 37 east (Hartford Road) – Edison	Southern end of SR 37 concurrency
Clay	Fort Gaines	63.5	102.2	SR 37 west (Hartford Road) – Shorterville	Northern end of SR 37 concurrency
Clay		65.2	104.9	SR 266 east (Coleman Road) – Coleman	Western terminus of SR 266
Quitman		83.2	133.9	US 82 east / SR 50 east	Southern end of US 82/SR 50 concurrency
Quitman	Georgetown	85.4	137.4	US 82 west / SR 50 west (Middle Street) / SR 27 east	Northern end of US 82/SR 50 concurrency; southern end of SR 27 concurrency; western terminus of SR 27
Quitman	Georgetown	86.3	138.9	SR 27 east – Lumpkin	Northern end of SR 27 concurrency
Stewart		102	164	SR 39 Conn. east – Lumpkin	Western terminus of SR 39 Conn.
Stewart		106	171	SR 39 Spur west – Pittsview	Eastern terminus of SR 39 Spur
Stewart	Louvale	118	190	US 27 / SR 1 (Martha Berry Highway) / Tatum Road east – Lumpkin, Cusseta	Northern terminus of SR 39; western terminus of Tatum Road
1.000 mi = 1.609 km; 1.000 km = 0.621 mi: Concurrency terminus

== Special routes ==
=== Connector route ===
State Route 39 Connector
- Location: Florence Marina State Park–Lumpkin
- Length: 15.7 mi (25.3 km)

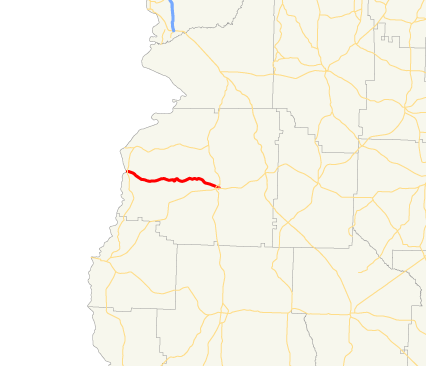
Map of SR 39 Connector

State Route 39 Connector (SR 39 Connector) is a 15.7-mile-long (25.3 km) connector route that travels totally within Stewart County. As its designation implies, it connects the SR 39 mainline near Florence Marina State Park with US 27/SR 1 and SR 1 Connector in Lumpkin. The route passes through Providence Canyon State Park.

SR 39 Connector begins at an intersection with the SR 39 mainline southeast of Florence Marina State Park, south-southwest of Omaha. It travels to the southeast, crossing over a northeastern arm of the Walter F. George Lake. Then, it curves to an eastern orientation and travels through Providence Canyon State Park. The route then travels to the east-southeast. Just before entering the city limits of Lumpkin, it intersects US 27/SR 1 (Martha Berry Highway). At its intersection with Florence Street, the connector curves to the east and meets its eastern terminus, an intersection with SR 1 Connector (Chestnut Street).

SR 39 Connector is not part of the National Highway System, a system of roadways important to the nation's economy, defense, and mobility.

The entire route is in Stewart County.

Location	mi	km	Destinations	Notes
	0.0	0.0	SR 39 – Georgetown, Omaha	Western terminus
	15.2	24.5	US 27 / SR 1 (Martha Berry Highway)	
Lumpkin	15.7	25.3	SR 1 Conn. (Chestnut Street)	Eastern terminus
1.000 mi = 1.609 km; 1.000 km = 0.621 mi

=== Spur route ===
State Route 39 Spur
- Location: Alabama state line–southwest of Omaha
- Length: 1.5 mi (2.4 km)

State Route 39 Spur (SR 39 Spur) is a 1.5-mile-long (2.4 km) spur route that travels from the Alabama state line to the SR 39 mainline southwest of Omaha. West of the Chattahoochee River, at the Alabama state line, the roadway becomes known as Alabama State Route 208.

SR 39 Spur is not part of the National Highway System, a system of roadways important to the nation's economy, defense, and mobility.

The entire route is in Stewart County.

Location	mi	km	Destinations	Notes
Alabama state line	0.0	0.0	SR 208 west (Omaha Road) – Pittsview	Western terminus at the Alabama state line, at a crossing over the Chattahoochee River
	1.5	2.4	SR 39 – Georgetown, Omaha	Eastern terminus
1.000 mi = 1.609 km; 1.000 km = 0.621 mi
