= Georgia State Route 91 =

Highway in Georgia

State Route 91
- Georgia State Route 91 highlighted in red

Route information
- Maintained by GDOT
- Length: 85.68 mi (137.89 km)
- Existed: 1930–present

Major junctions
- South end: SR 2 at the Florida state line southwest of Donalsonville
- US 84 / SR 38 in Donalsonville; US 27 / SR 1 in Colquitt; SR 37 in Newton; SR 62 southwest of Albany; US 19 Bus. / US 82 Bus. / SR 520 Bus. in Albany; US 19 / US 82 / SR 3 / SR 133 / SR 520 in Albany
- North end: SR 32 northeast of Albany

Location
- Country: United States
- State: Georgia
- Counties: Seminole, Miller, Baker, Dougherty, Lee

Highway system
- Georgia State Highway System; Interstate; US; State; Special
← SR 90	→ SR 91W

State Route 91 (SR 91) is an 85.68-mile-long (137.89 km) south-to-north state highway in the southwest part of the U.S. state of Georgia. The highway travels from its southern terminus at the Florida state line, southwest of Donalsonville, where the roadway continues as Florida State Road 2 (SR 2), northeast through Albany to its northern terminus, an intersection with SR 32 at a point northeast of the city. It also travels through Donalsonville, Colquitt, and Newton.

== Route description ==
SR 91 begins at the Florida state line, where the roadway continues as State Road 2. Just east of the state line, the highway has an intersection with SR 285. Northeast, in Donalsonville, the highway intersects US 84/SR 38/SR 39. The four highways have a very brief concurrency through the city. Just prior to leaving the city, SR 39 departs the concurrency to the south, while SR 91 departs to the north. Southwest of Colquitt, is an intersection with SR 273. Just west of the city, SR 91 intersects SR 45. The two highways begin a concurrency to the northeast. Just after that, they intersect US 27/SR 1. The three-highway concurrency heads east to Colquitt. In the city, US 27/SR 1 depart to the southeast, while SR 45/SR 91 continue to the east. Just to the east, SR 45 departs to the north, while SR 91 heads east. SR 91 heads northeast to an intersection with SR 253. The highway heads northeast to Newton. In Newton, the highway intersects SR 37 and SR 200. Just southwest of Albany, SR 91 intersects SR 62. In the city, is an intersection with SR 234. Farther into the city, is an intersection with US 19 Bus./US 82 Bus./SR 520 Bus. Just before leaving Albany, the highway has an interchange with the Liberty Expressway (US 19/US 82/SR 3/SR 133/SR 520). SR 91 heads northeast until it reaches its northern terminus, at an intersection with SR 32. The roadway continues as Philema Road North.

The following portions of SR 91 are part of the National Highway System, a system of routes determined to be the most important for the nation's economy, mobility, and defense:

- The entire length of the US 27/SR 1 concurrency in Colquitt
- From the SR 62 intersection near Albany to a point located at the approximate Dougherty–Lee county line

== History ==
=== 1930s ===
SR 91 was established between October 1929 and June 1930 from US 84/SR 38 in Donalsonville northeast to Colquitt and then east-northeast to SR 37 in Newton. In January 1932, it was extended north-northeast to Albany. In April, it was extended south-southwest to the Florida state line. By the beginning of August, the southern terminus was truncated to just east of the Florida state line. That month, the southern terminus was re-extended to the Florida state line. The next month, the southern terminus was truncated again to just east of the Florida state line. From the SR 62 intersection southwest of Albany, SR 91 was under construction. In October, the southern terminus was re-extended yet again to the Florida state line. In August 1933, the segment from the SR 62 intersection to Albany had a "completed hard surface". By the middle of 1937, the portion of SR 91 from Newton to the SR 62 was under construction. By the beginning of October, a small portion in the southwestern part of Albany was under construction. At the end of the year, the highway was extended north on US 19/SR 3 to the northern part of Albany and then on a sole path to the Dougherty–Lee county line just east of the Chehaw State Park. Nearly the entire segment from the Florida state line to Donalsonville was under construction. By September 1938, the Dougherty County portion of the Newton–Albany segment had a completed hard surface. Two segments had completed grading, but was not surfaced: the entire Seminole County portion and the Baker County portion of the Newton–Albany segment. By July 1939, the entire portion of SR 91 in Donalsonville had a completed hard surface. A small portion just west of the Miller–Baker county line had completed grading, but was not surfaced. The sole portion of the extension north of Albany (northeast of US 19/SR 3) was under construction. By October, the Baker County portion of the Newton–Albany segment had a "sand clay or top soil" surface. By the end of the year, the Miller County portion of the Colquitt–Newton segment was under construction.

=== 1940s ===
In the first quarter of 1940, the bridge over the Chattahoochee River at the Florida state line was indicated to be a toll bridge. Two segments had completed grading, but were not surfaced: nearly the entire portion from Florida to Donalsonville and the sole portion north of Albany. Three segments were under construction: the southern terminus, the Miller County portion of the Donalsonville–Colquitt segment, and the Colquitt–Newton segment. By October, the bridge over the Chattahoochee River was no longer indicated to be a toll bridge. The sole portion north of Albany had a completed hard surface. From the southern terminus to the southwest part of Donalsonville, SR 91 was under construction. By the end of the year, two segments had a completed hard surface: from Colquitt to a point east of the Miller–Baker county line and the Baker County portion of the Newton–Albany segment. By the middle of 1941, nearly the entire segment from the Florida state line to Donalsonville had a sand clay or top soil surface. By the end of the year, the Colquitt–Newton segment had a completed hard surface. Between the beginning of 1945 and November 1946, the entire length of SR 91 from the Florida state line to the Dougherty–Lee county line had a completed hard surface.

=== 1950s to 1980s ===
In 1952, an unnumbered road was built from the northern terminus of SR 91 northeast to SR 32 in the southeastern part of Lee County. Between June 1955 and July 1957, SR 32's path between Leesburg and Ashburn was shifted to the northeast. This meant that the unnumbered road no longer ended at SR 32. In 1971, SR 91 was extended north-northeast to SR 32's new path through Lee County, at a point east of Leesbsurg. In 1973, the path of SR 91 in the Newton area was shifted southeast to travel through the city. Its former path around the northwest part of the city was redesignated as SR 702. By March 1980, SR 702 was decommissioned, and SR 91 was reverted to its previous path around Newton.

== Major intersections ==
County	Location	mi	km	Destinations	Notes
Chattahoochee River		0.000	0.000	Southern terminus; continuation into Florida as FL SR 2 over the German Talmadge Bridge	
Seminole		1.871	3.011	SR 285 east (Ned Alday River Road) / J.O. Harvey River Road north – Seminole State Park, Lake Seminole	Western terminus of SR 285; southern terminus of J.O. Harvey River Road
Seminole	Donalsonville	8.347	13.433	SR 91 Alt. north (South Wiley Avenue)	Southern terminus of SR 91 Alt.; provides access to Donalsonville Hospital Emergency Center
Seminole	Donalsonville	8.629	13.887	SR 39 south (South Tennile Avenue) – Seminole State Park	Southern end of SR 39 concurrency; provides access to Donalsonville Municipal Airport
Seminole	Donalsonville	9.188	14.787	US 84 / SR 38 (East 3rd Street) – Jakin, Bainbridge	
Seminole	Donalsonville	9.378	15.092	SR 39 north (West Crawford Street) – Blakely, Ft. Gaines	Northern end of SR 39 concurrency
Seminole		10.251	16.497	SR 91 Alt. south (North Wiley Avenue) – Health Dept.	Northern terminus of SR 91 Alt.; provides access to Donalsonville Hospital Emergency Center
Miller		19.495	31.374	SR 273 west (Mayhaw Road) – Cedar Springs	Eastern terminus of SR 273
Miller	Colquitt	21.560	34.697	SR 45 south / Rock Road west – Iron City	Southern end of SR 45 concurrency; eastern terminus of Rock Road
Miller	Colquitt	21.694	34.913	US 27 north / SR 1 north – Blakely, Shelby Acres Farm	Southern end of US 27 / SR 1 concurrency
Miller	Colquitt	22.902	36.857	US 27 south / SR 1 south / SR 45 Truck begins / SR 91 Truck begins (Crawford Street) – Bainbridge	Northern end of US 27 / SR 1 concurrency; southern terminus of SR 45 Truck and SR 91 Truck
Miller	Colquitt	23.083	37.148	SR 45 Conn. south (First Street) to US 27	Traffic circle around Miller County Courthouse
Miller	Colquitt	23.144	37.247	SR 45 north (First Street) – Iron City, Arlington, Bainbridge, Blakely	Northern end of SR 45 concurrency
Miller	Colquitt	23.689	38.124	SR 45 Truck south / SR 91 Spur south / SR 91 Truck south	Northern terminus of SR 45 Truck / SR 91 Spur / SR 91 Truck
Baker		36.288	58.400	SR 253 south / Josuli Road north – Bainbridge	Northern terminus of SR 253; southern terminus of Josuli Road
Baker	Newton	50.265	80.894	SR 37 – Morgan, Camilla	
Baker	Newton	50.461	81.209	SR 200 west (Sunset Avenue) to SR 37 – Damascus, Newton	Eastern terminus of SR 200
Dougherty		66.639	107.245	SR 62 west (Leary Road) / Hardup Road south – Arlington	Southern end of SR 62 concurrency
Dougherty	Albany	70.224	113.015	SR 62 east (South Slappey Boulevard) – Albany, Dawson	Northern end of SR 62 concurrency
Dougherty	Albany	70.425	113.338	SR 234 (West Oakridge Drive) to SR 300 (Ga.–Fla. Parkway) – Darton Col., Albany Tech College, Albany State University, Marine Corps Logistics Base	
Dougherty	Albany	72.664	116.941	US 19 Bus. / US 82 Bus. / SR 520 Bus. (West Oglethorpe Boulevard) to SR 300 – Albany State University, Albany Tech. Col.	
Dougherty	Albany	74.765	120.323	US 19 south / US 82 east / SR 3 south / SR 133 south / SR 520 east (Liberty Expressway east) / North Washington Street south – Sylvester, Camilla	Southern end of SR 133 concurrency; Liberty Expressway east exit 5; North Washington Street can only be accessed from the Liberty Expressway exit ramp
Dougherty	Albany	75.039	120.764	US 19 north / US 82 west / SR 3 north / SR 520 west (Liberty Expressway west) / SR 133 north (North Jefferson Street) – Dawson, Leesburg	Northern end of SR 133 concurrency; Liberty Expressway west exit 5
Lee		85.678	137.885	SR 32 / Philema Road north – Leesburg, Ashburn, Cordele	Northern terminus; Philema Road continues north
1.000 mi = 1.609 km; 1.000 km = 0.621 mi: Concurrency terminus

== Special routes ==
=== Donalsonville alternate route ===
State Route 91 Alternate
- Location: Donalsonville
- Length: 1.9 mi (3.1 km)
- Existed: 1969–present

State Route 91 Alternate (SR 91 Alt.) is a 1.9-mile-long (3.1 km) alternate route of SR 91 that exists almost entirely within the city limits of Donalsonville. It is known as South Wiley Avenue for just over one-third of its path. The rest of the highway is known as North Wiley Avenue.

The alternate route begins at an intersection with the SR 91 mainline (Marianna Highway) in the southern part of the city. It heads nearly due north to an intersection with US 84/SR 38 (3rd Street). It continues to the north, then curves to the north-northeast, and crosses over some railroad tracks of CSX. Then it intersects SR 39 (Crawford Street). It continues to the north-northeast and curves to a due-north direction. It passes the Donalsonville Hospital Emergency Center and then curves back to the north-northeast again until it meets its northern terminus, another intersection with the SR 91 mainline just north of the city limits of Donalsonville.

The alternate route was established on its current path in 1969.

The entire route is in Seminole County.

Location	mi	km	Destinations	Notes
Donalsonville	0.0	0.0	SR 91 (Marianna Highway) – Malone, Fla., Donalsonville	Southern terminus
Donalsonville	0.7	1.1	US 84 (3rd Street) / SR 38 – Bainbridge	
Donalsonville	1.0	1.6	SR 39 (Crawford Street) – Blakely	
	1.9	3.1	SR 91 (Tennille Avenue)	Northern terminus
1.000 mi = 1.609 km; 1.000 km = 0.621 mi

=== Colquitt truck route ===
State Route 91 Truck
- Location: Colquitt
- Length: 1.1 mi (1.8 km)

State Route 91 Truck (SR 91 Truck) is a 1.1-mile-long (1.8 km) truck route of SR 91 that exists entirely within the central part of Miller County. Its route travels totally within the city limits of Colquitt. It is concurrent with SR 45 Truck for its entire length.

It begins at an intersection with US 27/SR 1/SR 45/SR 91 (West Crawford Street) in the central part of the city, at a point where SR 45 and SR 91 end their concurrency with US 27/SR 1. This intersection is also the southern terminus of SR 45 Truck, which begins a concurrency with SR 91 Truck. US 27, SR 1, SR 45 Truck, and SR 91 Truck travel to the southeast and curve to the east. They intersect the southern terminus of SR 45 Conn. (South First Street). The concurrency curves again to the southeast and intersects the southern terminus of SR 91 Spur, where the truck routes leave US 27/SR 1. SR 45 Truck, SR 91 Spur, and SR 91 Truck travel to the northeast and curve to a nearly due north direction. At an intersection with SR 91 (Main Street), SR 91 Spur and SR 91 Truck end, while SR 45 Truck turns left onto SR 91.

The entire route is in Colquitt, Miller County.

mi	km	Destinations	Notes
0.0	0.0	US 27 north / SR 1 north / SR 45 south / SR 91 south (West Crawford Street) – Blakely SR 45 north / SR 91 north (West College Street) – Arlington, Newton	Southern end of US 27/SR 1 and SR 45 Truck concurrencies; southern terminus of SR 45 Truck and SR 91 Truck
0.2	0.32	SR 45 Conn. north (South First Street)	Southern terminus of SR 45 Conn.; provides access to Miller County Hospital
0.7	1.1	US 27 south / SR 1 south (East Crawford Street) / SR 91 Spur begins – Bainbridge	Northern end of US 27/SR 1 concurrency; southern end of SR 91 Spur concurrency; southern terminus of SR 91 Spur
1.1	1.8	SR 45 Truck north / SR 91 (Main Street) – Colquitt, Donalsonville, Newton, Albany	Northern end of SR 45 Truck and SR 91 Spur concurrencies; northern terminus of SR 91 Spur and SR 91 Truck
1.000 mi = 1.609 km; 1.000 km = 0.621 mi: Concurrency terminus

=== Colquitt spur ===
State Route 91 Spur
- Location: Colquitt
- Length: 0.3 mi (480 m)
- Existed: 1960–present

State Route 91 Spur (SR 91 Spur) is a 0.3-mile-long (0.48 km) spur route of SR 91. It is entirely concurrent with SR 45 Truck and SR 91 Truck. Its southern terminus is at US 27/SR 1 (Crawford Street) in the central part of Colquitt. This intersection is where SR 45 Truck and SR 91 Truck end their concurrency with US 27/SR 1. The three highways travel to the northeast and curve to a nearly due north direction. At an intersection with SR 91 (Main Street), SR 91 Spur and SR 91 Truck end, and SR 45 Truck turns left onto SR 91.

Between July 1957 and June 1960, SR 91 Spur was established on its current path.

The entire route is in Colquitt, Miller County.

mi	km	Destinations	Notes
0.0	0.0	US 27 / SR 1 / SR 45 Truck south / SR 91 Truck south (Crawford Street) – Bainbridge, Donalsonville, Blakely	Southern end of SR 45 Truck/SR 91 Truck concurrency; southern terminus
0.3	0.48	SR 45 Truck north / SR 91 (Main Street) – Colquitt, Donalsonville, Newton, Albany	Northern terminus of SR 91 Spur/SR 91 Truck; north end of SR 45 Truck/SR 91 Truck concurrency
1.000 mi = 1.609 km; 1.000 km = 0.621 mi: Concurrency terminus
