= Georgia State Route 374 =

State highway in Georgia, United States

State Route 374
- SR 374 highlighted in red

Route information
- Maintained by GDOT
- Length: 7.9 mi (12.7 km)
- Existed: 1972–present

Major junctions
- South end: SR 253 north of Lake Seminole
- North end: SR 39 in central Seminole County

Location
- Country: United States
- State: Georgia
- Counties: Seminole

Highway system
- Georgia State Highway System; Interstate; US; State; Special
← SR 373	→ SR 375

State Route 374 (SR 374) is a 7.9-mile-long (12.7 km) rural state highway located entirely in Seminole County in the southwestern part of the U.S. state of Georgia. The roadway was built in the early 1960s and was designated as SR 374 in 1972.

== Route description ==
SR 374 begins at an intersection with SR 253 north of Lake Seminole and travels to the north and curves to the northwest. Then, it curves back to the north and again curves to the northwest until it reaches its northern terminus, an intersection with SR 39 approximately 6.8 miles (10.9 km) south of Donalsonville.

SR 374 is not part of the National Highway System, a system of roadways important to the nation's economy, defense, and mobility.

== History ==
The roadway that would eventually become SR 374 was built between 1960 and 1963 on nearly exactly the same alignment as the current one. In 1972, the roadway was extended southward to the northern shore of Lake Seminole and the entire roadway was designated as SR 374. In 1997, the segment south of SR 253 was removed from the state highway system.

== Major intersections ==
The entire route is in Seminole County.

Location	mi	km	Destinations	Notes
	0.0	0.0	SR 253 – Seminole State Park, Reynoldsville	Southern terminus
	7.9	12.7	SR 39 – Fairchild, Donalsonville	Northern terminus
1.000 mi = 1.609 km; 1.000 km = 0.621 mi
