= Georgia State Route 253 =

State highway in Georgia, United States

State Route 253
- Georgia State Route 253 highlighted in red

Route information
- Maintained by GDOT
- Length: 43.3 mi (69.7 km)

Major junctions
- South end: Trail's End Resort and Marina at the shores of Lake Seminole
- North end: SR 91 southwest of Newton

Location
- Country: United States
- State: Georgia
- Counties: Seminole, Decatur, Baker

Highway system
- Georgia State Highway System; Interstate; US; State; Special
← SR 252	→ SR 254

State Route 253 (SR 253) is a southwest–northeast state highway located in the southwestern part of the U.S. state of Georgia. Its routing is within portions of Seminole, Decatur, and Baker counties.

== Route description ==
SR 253 begins in Seminole County, at the entrance to Trail's End Resort and Marina, on the shore of Lake Seminole, which separates Florida and Georgia. It heads northeast and curves to the east, to an intersection with SR 39, at the northwest corner of Seminole State Park. It runs northeast until it intersects SR 374. SR 253 continues heading northeast, past Reynoldsville State Park, into Decatur County, and over a northern branch of Lake Seminole, until it meets SR 310 (Yates Spring Road). The highway continues its northeast trek until it enters Bainbridge.

In Bainbridge, it meets SR 253 Spur (Airport Road), before it crosses under US 27/US 84/SR 1/SR 38 (Wiregrass Georgia Parkway). Farther to the northeast is a short concurrency with US 27 Business/SR 1 Business (Dothan Road). The route then leaves the city to continue to the northeast, passing through rural areas, and crossing into Baker County, before meeting its northern terminus, an intersection with SR 91, southwest of Newton.

SR 253 is not part of the National Highway System, a system of roadways important to the nation's economy, defense, and mobility.

== Major intersections ==
County	Location	mi	km	Destinations	Notes
Seminole	Lake Seminole	0.0	0.0	Entrance to Trail's End Resort and Marina	Southern terminus
Seminole		2.3	3.7	SR 39 – Donalsonville	
Seminole		4.4	7.1	SR 374 north	Southern terminus of SR 374
Decatur	Lake Seminole	11.3	18.2	Crossing over Lake Seminole	
Decatur		13.0	20.9	SR 310 north (Yates Spring Road)	Southern terminus of SR 310
Decatur	Bainbridge	21.7	34.9	SR 253 Spur north (Airport Road)	Southern terminus of SR 253 Spur
Decatur	Bainbridge	22.3	35.9	US 27 / US 84 / SR 1 / SR 38 (Wiregrass Georgia Parkway)	
Decatur	Bainbridge	22.7	36.5	US 27 Bus. north / SR 1 Bus. north (Dothan Road)	Southern end of US 27 Business/SR 1 Business concurrency
Decatur	Bainbridge	23.1	37.2	US 27 Bus. south / SR 1 Bus. south (Dothan Road)	Northern end of US 27 Business/SR 1 Business concurrency
Baker		43.3	69.7	SR 91 – Colquitt, Newton	Northern terminus
1.000 mi = 1.609 km; 1.000 km = 0.621 mi: Concurrency terminus

== Bannered route ==
State Route 253 Spur
- Location: Bainbridge
- Length: 1.1 mi (1.8 km)

State Route 253 Spur (SR 253 Spur) is a 1.1-mile-long (1.8 km) spur route in the western part of Bainbridge.

It begins at an intersection with the SR 253 mainline southwest of its interchange with US 27/US 84/SR 1/SR 38. It heads north to meet its northern terminus, an intersection with US 84/SR 38, northwest of downtown Bainbridge.

SR 253 Spur is not part of the National Highway System, a system of roadways important to the nation's economy, defense, and mobility.

The entire route is in Bainbridge, Decatur County.

mi	km	Destinations	Notes
0.0	0.0	SR 253 (Spring Creek Road) – Reynoldsville	Southern terminus
1.1	1.8	US 84 / SR 38 (Dothan Road)	Northern terminus
1.000 mi = 1.609 km; 1.000 km = 0.621 mi
