= Georgia State Route 285 =

State highway in Georgia, United States

State Route 285
- SR 285 highlighted in red

Route information
- Maintained by GDOT
- Length: 13.9 mi (22.4 km)

Major junctions
- West end: SR 91 southwest of Donalsonville
- SR 39 south of Donalsonville
- East end: US 84 / SR 38 in Brinson

Location
- Country: United States
- State: Georgia
- Counties: Seminole, Decatur

Highway system
- Georgia State Highway System; Interstate; US; State; Special
← SR 284	→ SR 286

State Route 285 (SR 285) is a west–east state highway located in the southwestern part of the U.S. state of Georgia.

== Route description ==
SR 285 begins at an intersection with SR 91 (which goes to the state line) southwest of Donalsonville, in Seminole County, where the roadway continues as Butler Ferry Road. The route heads southeast along River Road for a short distance before turning and running nearly due east through rural portions of Seminole County. On its way through Seminole County, it intersects SR 39. Almost immediately after entering Decatur County, the route meets its eastern terminus. The route creates a direct route from the Florida State line for drivers in towns like Malone and Bascom to get to US 84/Bainbridge. It is close to the FL-GA-AL tripoint.

== Major intersections ==
County	Location	mi	km	Destinations	Notes
Seminole		0.0	0.0	SR 91 – Malone, Florida, Donalsonville	Western terminus
Seminole		6.1	9.8	SR 39 – Seminole State Park, Donalsonville	
Decatur		13.0	20.9	US 84 / SR 38 (Dothan Road) – Donalsonville, Brinson	Eastern terminus
1.000 mi = 1.609 km; 1.000 km = 0.621 mi
