= Jim Woodruff Dam =

Hydroelectric dam in Florida, United States

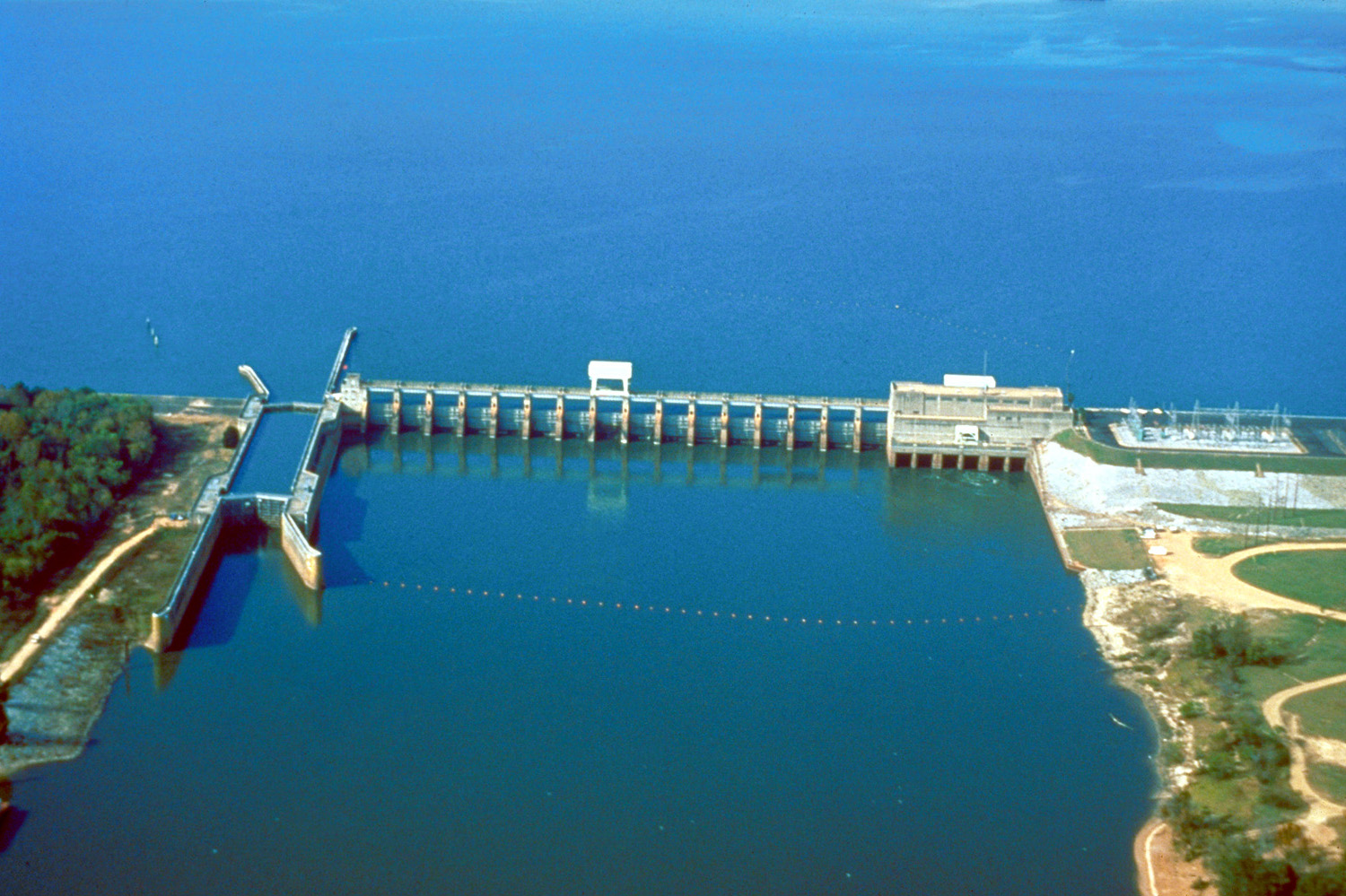
- Aerial view of Jim Woodruff Dam in 1999 (by U.S. Army Corps of Engineers)
- Interactive map of Jim Woodruff Dam
- Official name: Jim Woodruff Dam
- Location: Gadsden and Jackson Counties, Florida / Decatur and Seminole Counties, Georgia
- Coordinates: 30°42′31″N 84°51′50″W
- Construction began: about 1947
- Opening date: 1957
- Operator: U.S. Army Corps of Engineers

Dam and spillways
- Impounds: Chattahoochee, and Flint Rivers

Reservoir
- Creates: Lake Seminole
- Surface area: 58.6 square miles (152 km^{2})

Jim Woodruff Dam is a hydroelectric dam on the Apalachicola River, about 1,000 feet (300 m) south of that river's origin at the confluence of the Flint and Chattahoochee Rivers.

The dam impounds Lake Seminole on the common border of Florida and Georgia. The dam is named in honor of James W. Woodruff, Sr., a Georgia businessman who spearheaded the development of the Apalachicola-Chattahoochee-Flint Project.

Electricity from the dam is marketed by the Southeastern Power Administration.

== Project authorization and history ==
The Jim Woodruff Lock and Dam project was authorized by the U.S. Congress in the Rivers and Harbors Act of 1946. It is a key component of the larger Apalachicola-Chattahoochee-Flint Project, which was designed to expand the river system for navigation, hydropower, and other uses.

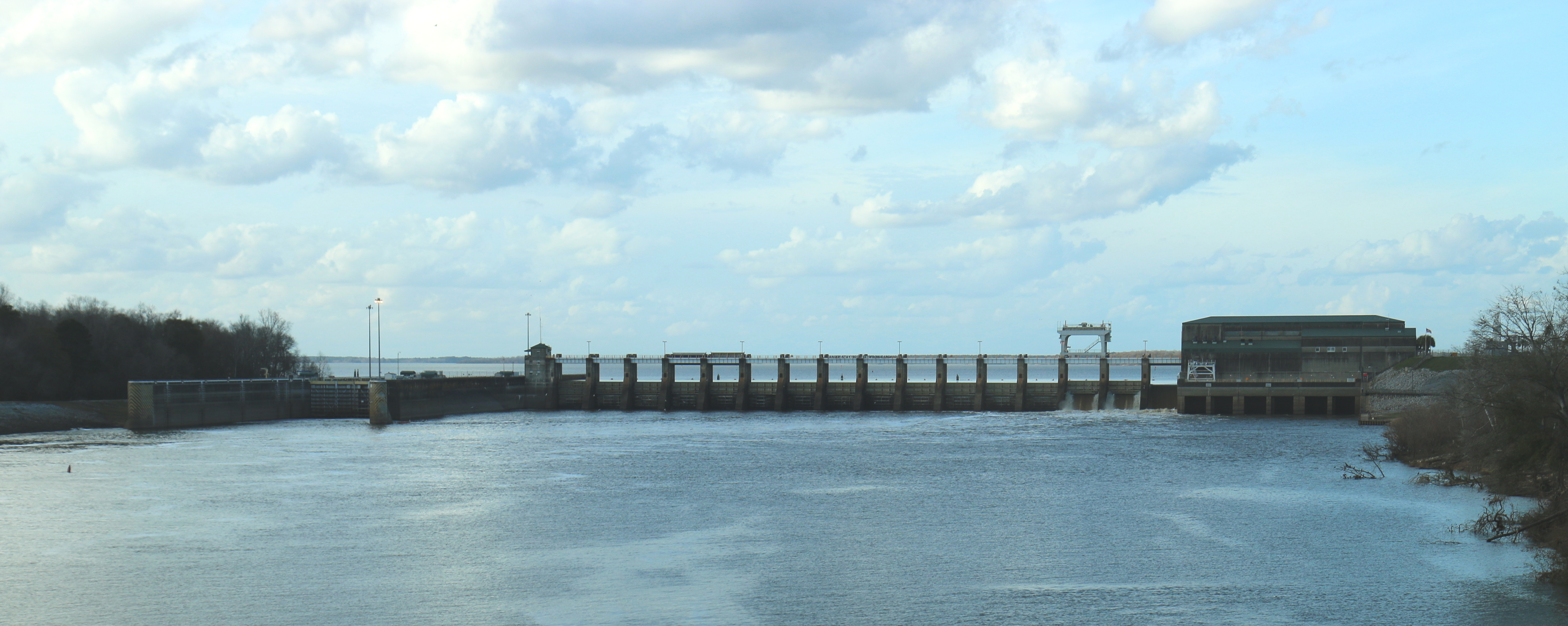
The dam, photographed from US90

A groundbreaking ceremony was held on October 1, 1947, to mark the official start of construction by the U.S. Army Corps of Engineers. The project was completed and the dam began full operation in 1957. The dam is named for James W. Woodruff, Sr, a businessman from Georgia who was a major component for the development of the ACF river system.

== Purposes and impact ==
The Jim Woodruff Dam is a multipurpose project. While the project is not authorized for flood control storage, its primary authorized purposes include:

- Navigation: The lock allows commercial and recreational vessels to bypass the dam, creating a navigable waterway as part of the ACF system.
- Hydroelectric power: The dam's power plant generates electricity for the region.
- Recreation: The creation of Lake Seminole established a major area for boating, fishing, and other water activities, managed in part by the Corps of Engineers and state parks.
- Wildlife: The project is operated to support fish and wildlife conservation.
- Water quality: The project also has a mandate for maintaining water quality.

The dam's construction and the subsequent filling of Lake Seminole inundated several historical and prehistoric sites, including the U.S. Army's 19th-century Fort Scott.

On October 10, 2018, the dam and its facilities were directly impacted by Hurricane Michael. While the main dam structure survived, the powerhouse roof sustained significant damage, and downed transmission lines temporarily halted power generation.

== See also ==
- Water wars in Florida
