= Dee Virgin =

American football player (born 1993)

Profile
- Position: Cornerback

Personal information
- Born: October 29, 1993 (age 33); Donalsonville, Georgia, U.S.
- Listed height: 5 ft 9 in (1.75 m)
- Listed weight: 195 lb (88 kg)

Career information
- High school: Seminole County (Donalsonville)
- College: West Alabama
- NFL draft: 2017: undrafted

Career history
- Houston Texans (2017–2018)*; Detroit Lions (2018–2020); Los Angeles Rams (2020)*; New England Patriots (2020); San Francisco 49ers (2021)*; Chicago Bears (2021)
- * Offseason or practice squad member only

Career NFL statistics
- Total tackles: 15
- Forced fumbles: 1
- Stats at Pro Football Reference

Javaris Drequis "Dee" Virgin (born October 29, 1993) is an American former professional football player who was a cornerback in the National Football League (NFL). He played college football for the West Alabama Tigers.

== Professional career ==
Pre-draft measurables
Height	Weight	Arm length	Hand span	40-yard dash	10-yard split	20-yard split	20-yard shuttle	Three-cone drill	Vertical jump	Broad jump	Bench press
5 ft 9 1/4 in (1.76 m)	194 lb (88 kg)	31 1/2 in (0.80 m)	8 1/2 in (0.22 m)	4.47 s	1.50 s	2.59 s	4.29 s	7.35 s	36.5 in (0.93 m)	10 ft 6 in (3.20 m)	16 reps
All values from Pro Day

=== Houston Texans ===
Virgin signed with the Houston Texans as an undrafted free agent on May 12, 2017. He was waived by the Texans on September 6, 2017 and was re-signed to the practice squad. He signed a reserve/future contract with the Texans on January 1, 2018.

On September 1, 2018, Virgin was waived by the Texans.

=== Detroit Lions ===
On September 2, 2018, Virgin was claimed off waivers by the Detroit Lions. On October 2, 2018, Virgin was waived by the Lions and was re-signed to the practice squad. He was promoted to the active roster on December 22, 2018.

Virgin re-signed with the Lions on April 21, 2020. He was waived on September 5, 2020 and signed to the practice squad the next day. He was elevated to the active roster on September 19 and November 25 for the team's weeks 2 and 12 games against the Green Bay Packers and Houston Texans, and reverted to the practice squad after each game. Virgin was released on December 17, 2020.

=== Los Angeles Rams ===
On December 22, 2020, Virgin signed with the practice squad of the Los Angeles Rams. He was released on December 29, 2020.

=== New England Patriots ===
On January 1, 2021, Virgin was signed to the New England Patriots active roster. He was waived on August 31, 2021.

=== San Francisco 49ers ===
On September 3, 2021, Virgin was signed to the San Francisco 49ers practice squad. He was released on September 21, 2021.

=== Chicago Bears ===
On December 1, 2021, Virgin was signed to the Chicago Bears practice squad. He was waived on January 4, 2022.

=== Orlando Guardians ===
On November 17, 2022, Virgin was selected by the Orlando Guardians of the XFL, but did not report.
