= National Register of Historic Places listings in Seminole County, Georgia =

This is a list of properties and districts in Seminole County, Georgia that are listed on the National Register of Historic Places (NRHP).

This National Park Service list is complete through NPS recent listings posted March 21, 2025.

== Current listings ==
	Name on the Register	Image	Date listed	Location	City or town	Description
1	Donalsonville Historic District	Donalsonville Historic District	March 20, 2002 (#02000190)	Roughly bounded by the Seaboard RR line, W. Third St., and Morris and S. Tennille Aves. 31°02′33″N 84°52′57″W	Donalsonville	Donalsonville City Hall on W 2nd St.
2	Seminole County Courthouse	Seminole County Courthouse	September 18, 1980 (#80001231)	Courthouse Sq. 31°02′30″N 84°53′05″W	Donalsonville	
3	Southeastern Holiness Institute		June 21, 1982 (#82002463)	102 Hospital Circle; 31°03′03″N 84°52′51″W	Donalsonville	
