= Seminole County School District =

School district in Georgia (U.S. state)

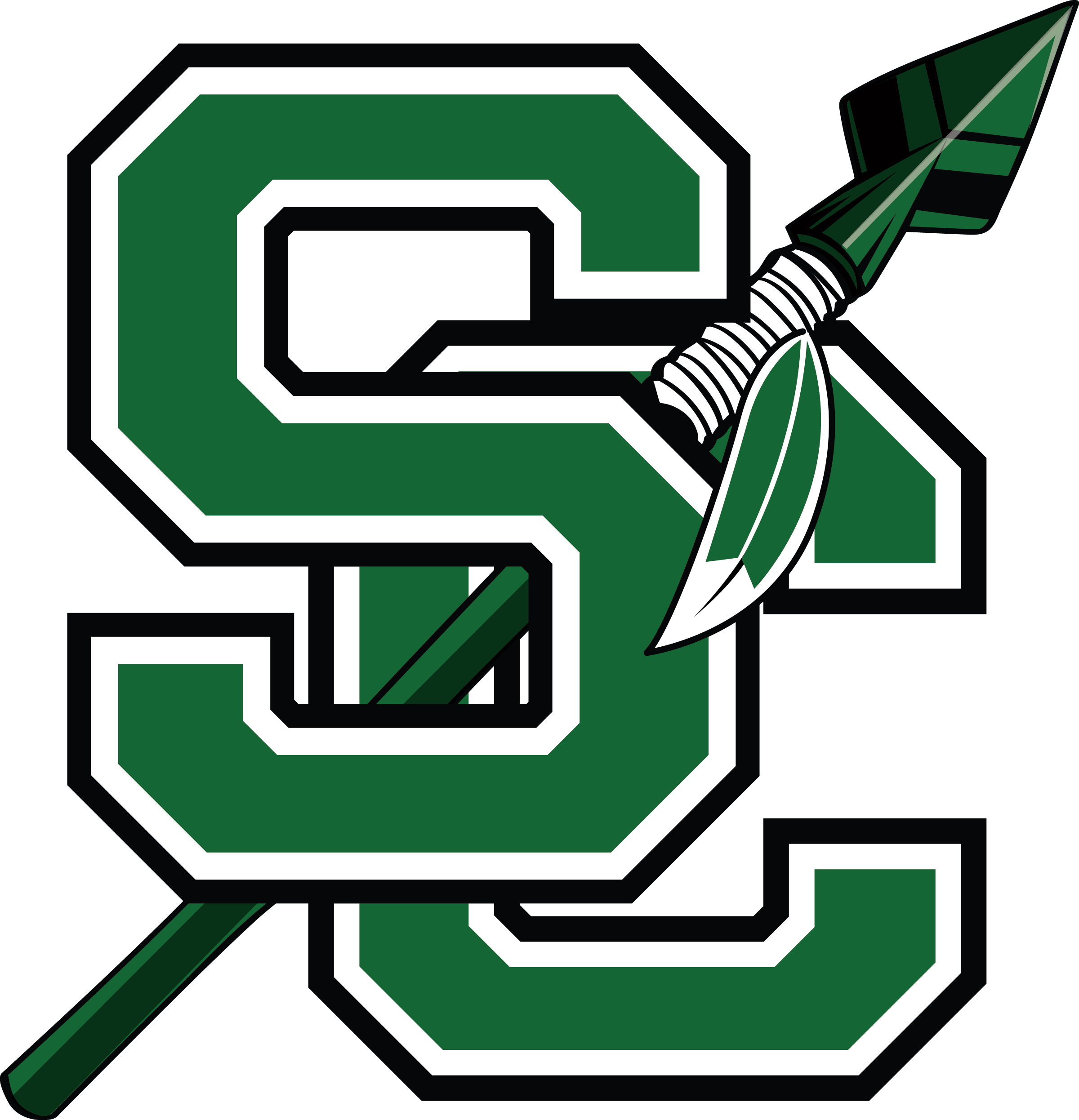

Address
- 203 E 6th Street Donalsonville, Georgia, 39845; United States
- Coordinates: 31.034852°N 84.881004°W

District information
- Grades: Pre-Kindergarten – 12
- Superintendent: Mark Earnest
- Accreditations: Southern Association of Colleges and Schools; Georgia Accrediting Commission

Students and staff
- Enrollment: 1,340 (2022–23)
- Faculty: 102.40 (FTE)
- Student–teacher ratio: 13.09

Other information
- Telephone: (229) 524-2433
- Website: seminole.k12.ga.us

The Seminole County School District is a public school district in Seminole County, Georgia, United States, based in Donalsonville. It serves the communities of Donalsonville and Iron City.

== Schools ==
The Seminole County School District has one elementary school and one middle-high school.

=== Elementary school ===
- Seminole County Elementary School

=== Middle-high school ===
- Seminole County Middle/High School

== History ==
The first school in Donalsonville was held in the Masonic lodge in 1892. Later the Donalsonville School was expanded into a two story building, including grades one through eleven.

The first recorded black school was not until the late 1920s. By 1955, there was only one school for black students in Seminole County, the Seminole County Training School; it was located in Donalsonville and enrolled around 540 students. In 1970, during the integration of schools, three schools were created. They were the only schools in Seminole County and included Donalsonville Elementary, which housed Kindergarten through fourth grades; Seminole County Junior High School, with fifth through eighth grades; and Seminole County Senior High School, housing grades nine through twelve.

Today there are two schools, Seminole County Elementary, which includes Kindergarten through fifth grades; and Seminole Middle-High School, which houses grades six through twelve. Pre-K programs have also opened in Donalsonville.

Seminole County High School was once the playing ground for Washington Redskins player Phillip Daniels. He left Donalsonville for the University of Georgia, where he played out his college football career until he was drafted in 1996 by the Seattle Seahawks.
