= Cyrene, Georgia =

- Unincorporated community
- Location within Georgia
- Coordinates: 31°00′N 84°42′W
- Country: United States
- State: Georgia
- County: Decatur
- Time zone: UTC-5 (Eastern (EST))
  - Summer (DST): UTC-4 (EDT)
- ZIP code: 39852
- Area code: 229
- GNIS feature ID: 326242

Cyrene is an unincorporated community in Decatur County, in the U.S. state of Georgia.

== History ==
A post office called Cyrene was established in 1894, and remained in operation until 1938. The community was named after the ancient city of Cyrenaica.
