= Ausmac, Georgia =

- Unincorporated community
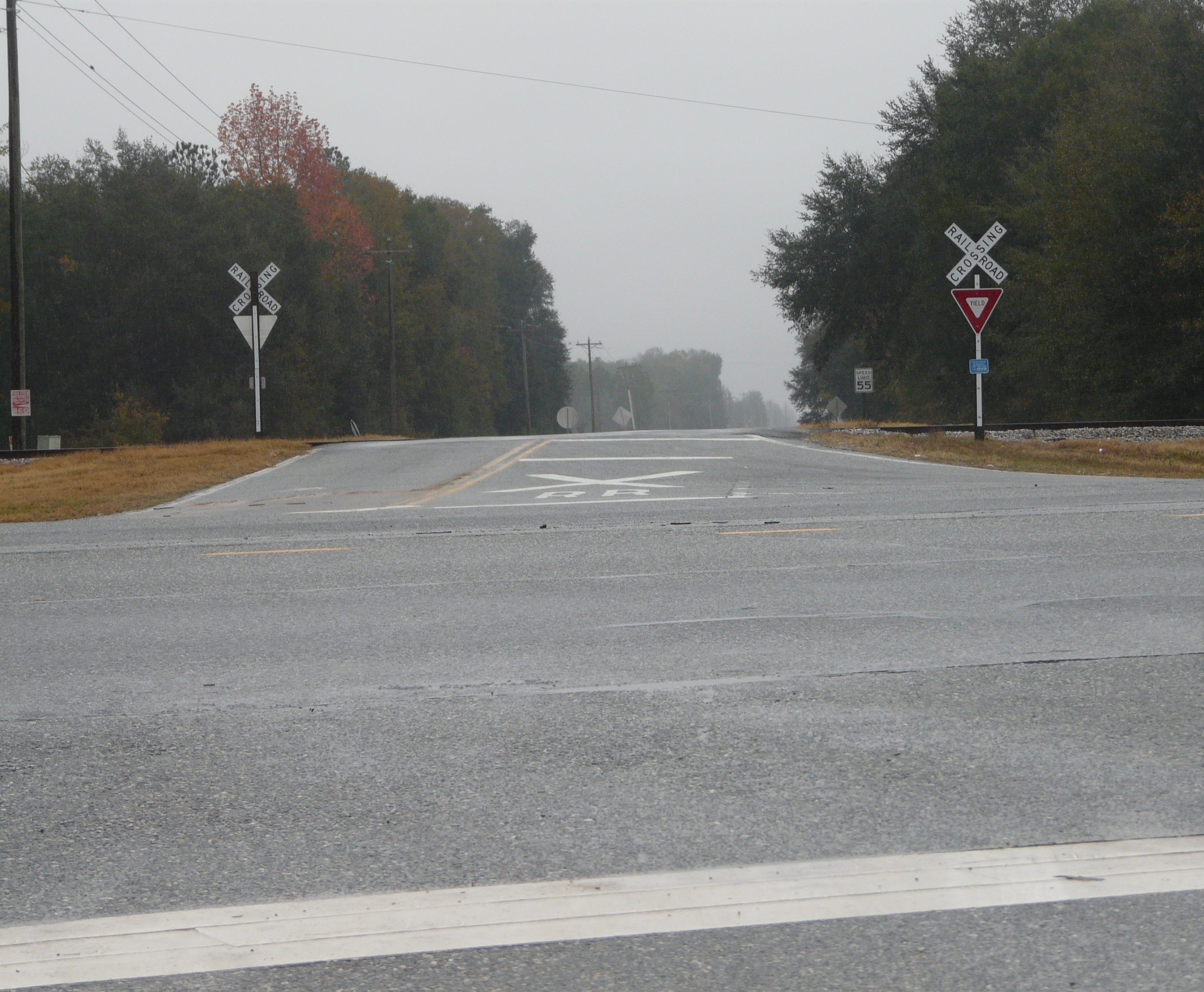
- Georgia Southwestern Railroad crossing in Ausmac

- Location within Georgia
- Coordinates: 30°59′47″N 84°37′27″W
- Country: United States
- State: Georgia
- County: Decatur
- Time zone: UTC-5 (Eastern (EST))
  - Summer (DST): UTC-4 (EDT)
- ZIP code: 39852
- Area code: 229
- GNIS feature ID: 331067

Ausmac is an unincorporated community in Decatur County, in the U.S. state of Georgia.

== History ==
The name "Ausmac" is an amalgamation of Ausley and McCaskill, two businessmen in the local turpentine industry.
