= Steam Mill, Georgia =

Unincorporated community in Georgia, U.S.

Coordinates: 30°58′13″N 84°58′07″W

Steam Mill is an unincorporated community in Seminole County, in the U.S. state of Georgia.

== History ==
A post office called Steam Mill was established in 1852, and remained in operation until 1910. The community was named for its steam mill which processed cotton and grain. A variant name was "Dickersons Store".
