= Decatur County, Georgia =

County in Georgia, United States

- County
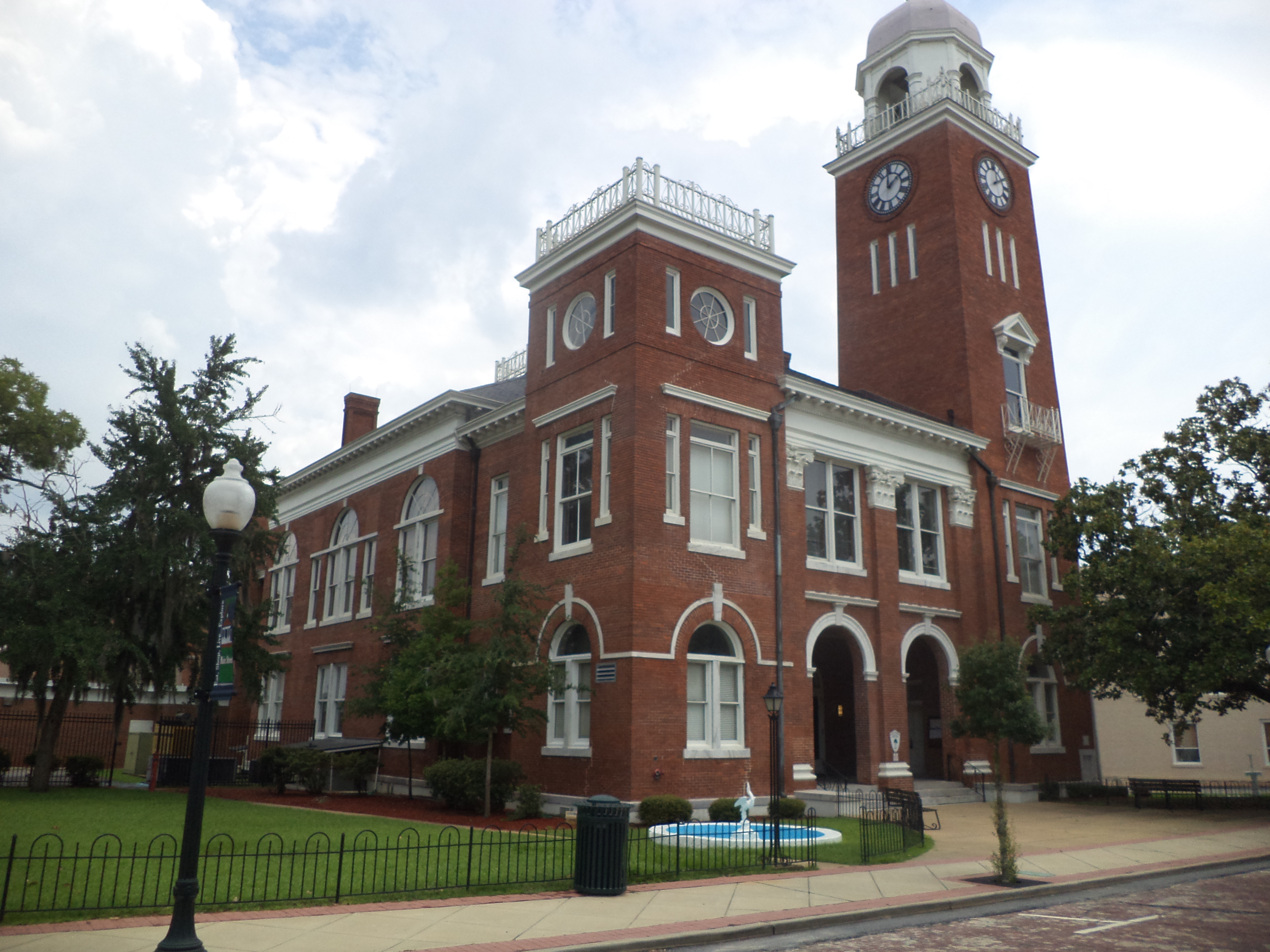
- Decatur County Courthouse in Bainbridge

- Seal Logo

- Location within the U.S. state of Georgia
- Coordinates: 30°53′N 84°35′W
- Country: United States
- State: Georgia
- Founded: 1823; 203 years ago
- Named for: Stephen Decatur
- Seat: Bainbridge
- Largest city: Bainbridge

Area
  - Total: 623 sq mi (1,610 km^{2})
  - Land: 597 sq mi (1,550 km^{2})
  - Water: 26 sq mi (67 km^{2}) 4.2%

Population (2020)
  - Total: 29,367
  - Estimate (2025): 29,432 ▲
  - Density: 49/sq mi (19/km^{2})
- Time zone: UTC−5 (Eastern)
  - Summer (DST): UTC−4 (EDT)
- Congressional district: 2nd
- Website: www.decaturcountyga.gov

Decatur County is a county located in the U.S. state of Georgia. As of the 2020 census, the population was 29,367. The county seat is Bainbridge.

Decatur County comprises the Bainbridge, GA Micropolitan Statistical Area (μSA), which is included in the Tallahassee—Bainbridge, FL-GA Combined Statistical Area.

== History ==
The county was created by an act of the Georgia General Assembly on December 8, 1823, from a portion of Early County. Three other counties were created from land that was originally part of Decatur County.

In 1825, a portion of Decatur was used in the creation of Thomas County. In 1905, another portion of Decatur was used in the creation of part of Grady County. In 1920, the western portion of Decatur County was used to form Seminole County in its entirety.

Decatur County is named for United States Navy Commodore Stephen Decatur, a hero of the War of 1812.

== Geography ==
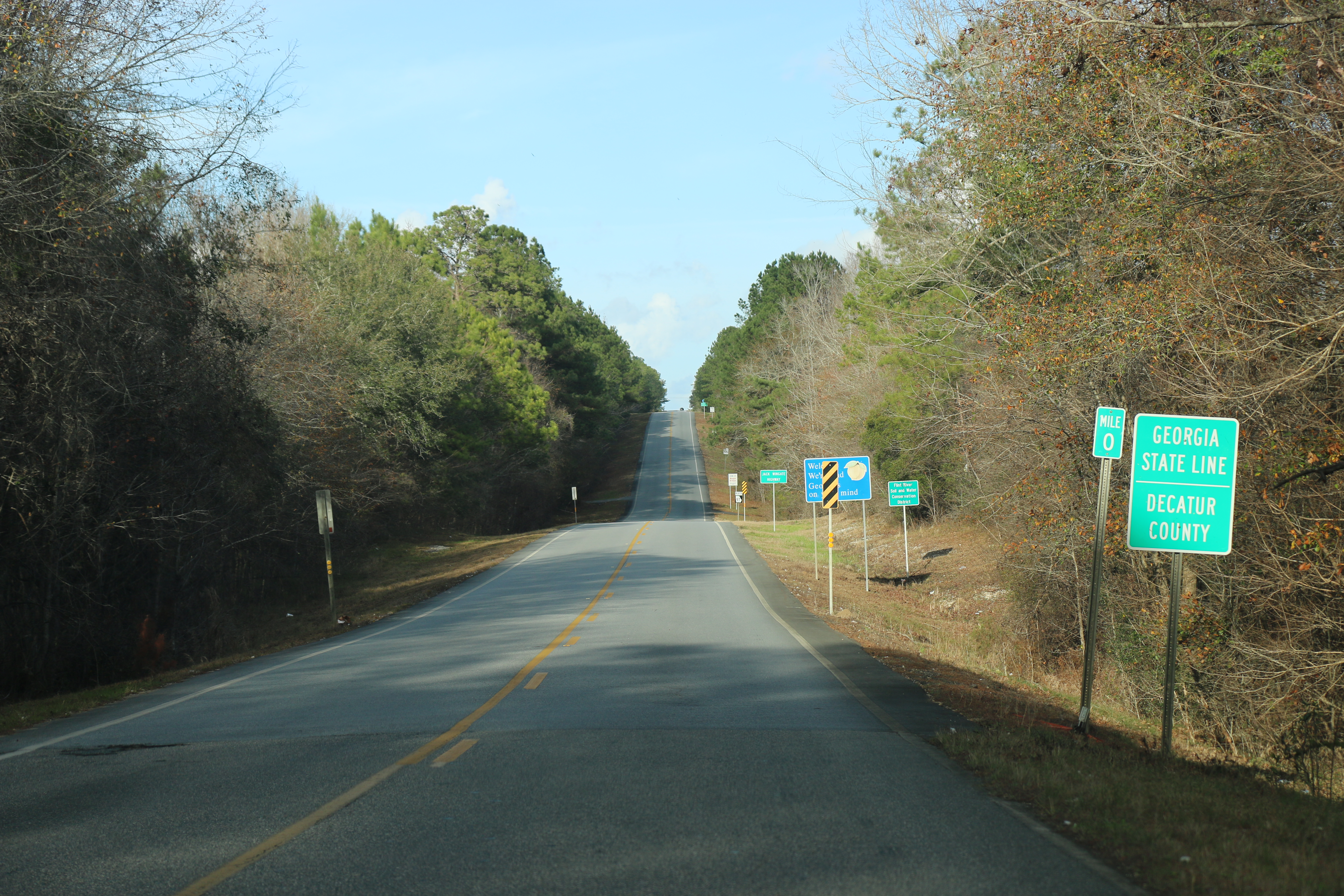
The welcome sign for Decatur County on State Route 97

According to the U.S. Census Bureau, the county has a total area of 623 square miles (1,610 km^{2}), of which 597 square miles (1,550 km^{2}) is land and 26 square miles (67 km^{2}) (4.2%) is water.

The bulk of Decatur County, from northeast to southwest, and centered on Bainbridge, is located in the Lower Flint River sub-basin of the ACF River Basin (Apalachicola-Chattahoochee-Flint River Basin). Almost all of the county's western border is located in the Spring Creek sub-basin of the same ACF River Basin. The southwestern portion of Decatur County, centered on Attapulgus, and bordered on the west by State Route 302, is located on the Lower Ochlockonee River sub-basin of the larger Ochlockonee River basin. Finally, the county's southwestern corner, west of State Route 302, is located in the Apalachicola River sub-basin of the same larger ACF River basin.

=== Major highways ===
- U.S. Route 27 / State Route 1
  - U.S. Route 27 Business / State Route 1 Business
- U.S. Route 84 / State Route 38
  - U.S. Route 84 Business / State Route 38 Business
- State Route 97
  - State Route 97 Spur
- State Route 241
- State Route 253
  - State Route 253 Spur
- State Route 262
- State Route 285
- State Route 302
  - State Route 302 Spur
- State Route 309
- State Route 310
- State Route 311

=== Adjacent counties ===
- Miller County - north
- Mitchell County - northeast
- Baker County - northeast
- Grady County - east
- Gadsden County, Florida - south
- Seminole County - west

== Communities ==
=== Cities ===
- Attapulgus
- Bainbridge
- Climax

=== Town ===
- Brinson

=== Census-Designated Place ===
- Faceville

=== Unincorporated communities ===
- Amsterdam
- Ausmac
- Cyrene
- Eldorendo
- Fowlstown
- Vada

== Demographics ==
Historical population
Census	Pop.	Note	%±
1830	3,854		—
1840	5,872		52.4%
1850	8,262		40.7%
1860	11,922		44.3%
1870	15,183		27.4%
1880	19,072		25.6%
1890	19,949		4.6%
1900	29,454		47.6%
1910	29,045		−1.4%
1920	31,785		9.4%
1930	23,622		−25.7%
1940	22,234		−5.9%
1950	23,620		6.2%
1960	25,203		6.7%
1970	22,310		−11.5%
1980	25,495		14.3%
1990	25,511		0.1%
2000	28,240		10.7%
2010	27,842		−1.4%
2020	29,367		5.5%
2025 (est.)	29,432	▲	0.2%
U.S. Decennial Census; 1790-1880 1890-1910; 1920-1930 1930-1940; 1940-1950 1960-1980; 1980-2000 2010

=== Racial and ethnic composition ===
Decatur County, Georgia – Racial and ethnic composition Note: the US Census treats Hispanic/Latino as an ethnic category. This table excludes Latinos from the racial categories and assigns them to a separate category. Hispanics/Latinos may be of any race.
Race / Ethnicity (NH = Non-Hispanic)	Pop 1980	Pop 1990	Pop 2000	Pop 2010	Pop 2020	% 1980	% 1990	% 2000	% 2010	% 2020
White alone (NH)	15,389	15,012	15,800	14,615	14,280	60.36%	58.85%	55.95%	52.49%	48.63%
Black or African American alone (NH)	9,818	9,917	11,227	11,366	12,200	38.51%	38.87%	39.76%	40.82%	41.54%
Native American or Alaska Native alone (NH)	24	61	59	57	64	0.09%	0.24%	0.21%	0.20%	0.22%
Asian alone (NH)	38	40	86	138	183	0.15%	0.16%	0.30%	0.50%	0.62%
Native Hawaiian or Pacific Islander alone (NH)	x	x	4	3	16	x	x	0.01%	0.01%	0.05%
Other race alone (NH)	0	9	3	33	64	0.00%	0.04%	0.01%	0.12%	0.22%
Mixed race or Multiracial (NH)	x	x	156	226	649	x	x	0.55%	0.81%	2.21%
Hispanic or Latino (any race)	226	472	905	1,404	1,911	0.89%	1.85%	3.20%	5.04%	6.51%
Total	25,495	25,511	28,240	27,842	29,367	100.00%	100.00%	100.00%	100.00%	100.00%

=== 2020 census ===
As of the 2020 United States census, there were 29,367 people and 7,113 families residing in the county. The median age was 40.0 years. 23.6% of residents were under the age of 18 and 18.0% of residents were 65 years of age or older. For every 100 females there were 95.4 males, and for every 100 females age 18 and over there were 92.3 males age 18 and over. 47.2% of residents lived in urban areas, while 52.8% lived in rural areas.

The racial makeup of the county was 49.6% White, 41.7% Black or African American, 0.4% American Indian and Alaska Native, 0.6% Asian, 0.1% Native Hawaiian and Pacific Islander, 4.1% from some other race, and 3.6% from two or more races. Hispanic or Latino residents of any race comprised 6.5% of the population.

There were 11,466 households in the county, of which 31.3% had children under the age of 18 living with them and 34.8% had a female householder with no spouse or partner present. About 29.2% of all households were made up of individuals and 13.3% had someone living alone who was 65 years of age or older.

There were 13,036 housing units, of which 12.0% were vacant. Among occupied housing units, 61.9% were owner-occupied and 38.1% were renter-occupied. The homeowner vacancy rate was 1.3% and the rental vacancy rate was 6.3%.

== Education ==
Decatur County School District is the local school district with Bainbridge High School being the local high school.

Spring Creek Charter Academy was formed in 2019 and includes grades Pre-K through 9th Grade as of 2023–2024 school year with the next year being added as each grade progresses through the years.

Abraham Baldwin Agricultural College has a satellite campus in Bainbridge. Southern Regional Technical College has a satellite campus in Bainbridge serving the county.

== Politics ==
As of the 2020s, Decatur County is a Republican stronghold, voting 62% for Donald Trump in 2024. For elections to the United States House of Representatives, Decatur County is part of Georgia's 2nd congressional district, currently represented by Sanford Bishop. For elections to the Georgia State Senate, Decatur County is part of District 11. For elections to the Georgia House of Representatives, Decatur County is part of District 171.

United States presidential election results for Decatur County, Georgia
Year	Republican		Democratic		Third party(ies)	
Year	No.	%	No.	%	No.	%
1912	34	6.00%	500	88.18%	33	5.82%
1916	116	8.94%	1,147	88.37%	35	2.70%
1920	300	23.40%	982	76.60%	0	0.00%
1924	151	16.38%	637	69.09%	134	14.53%
1928	1,156	61.16%	734	38.84%	0	0.00%
1932	65	5.17%	1,169	93.00%	23	1.83%
1936	79	3.85%	1,965	95.71%	9	0.44%
1940	217	10.85%	1,781	89.05%	2	0.10%
1944	294	15.47%	1,606	84.53%	0	0.00%
1948	296	13.03%	1,209	53.21%	767	33.76%
1952	1,001	27.95%	2,581	72.05%	0	0.00%
1956	1,062	22.31%	3,699	77.69%	0	0.00%
1960	918	24.82%	2,780	75.18%	0	0.00%
1964	5,060	71.55%	2,011	28.44%	1	0.01%
1968	749	10.62%	1,729	24.51%	4,576	64.87%
1972	4,292	78.21%	1,196	21.79%	0	0.00%
1976	2,500	40.09%	3,736	59.91%	0	0.00%
1980	2,919	46.76%	3,242	51.93%	82	1.31%
1984	4,134	60.88%	2,656	39.12%	0	0.00%
1988	3,866	61.95%	2,348	37.62%	27	0.43%
1992	3,142	42.35%	3,198	43.11%	1,079	14.54%
1996	3,035	44.65%	3,245	47.74%	517	7.61%
2000	4,187	54.75%	3,398	44.43%	63	0.82%
2004	5,348	59.71%	3,577	39.94%	31	0.35%
2008	5,890	56.72%	4,424	42.60%	71	0.68%
2012	5,824	55.47%	4,591	43.72%	85	0.81%
2016	6,020	58.35%	4,124	39.97%	173	1.68%
2020	6,755	58.09%	4,782	41.12%	91	0.78%
2024	7,140	61.82%	4,372	37.86%	37	0.32%

United States Senate election results for Decatur County, Georgia2
Year	Republican		Democratic		Third party(ies)	
Year	No.	%	No.	%	No.	%
2020	6,696	58.49%	4,563	39.86%	190	1.66%
2020	5,919	58.92%	4,127	41.08%	0	0.00%

United States Senate election results for Decatur County, Georgia3
Year	Republican		Democratic		Third party(ies)	
Year	No.	%	No.	%	No.	%
2020	2,991	26.42%	1,738	15.35%	6,590	58.22%
2020	5,926	58.98%	4,121	41.02%	0	0.00%
2022	5,433	61.47%	3,303	37.37%	103	1.17%
2022	4,880	61.24%	3,088	38.76%	0	0.00%

Georgia Gubernatorial election results for Decatur County
Year	Republican		Democratic		Third party(ies)	
Year	No.	%	No.	%	No.	%
2022	5,659	63.71%	3,191	35.92%	33	0.37%

== See also ==
- National Register of Historic Places listings in Decatur County, Georgia
- List of counties in Georgia
