= Fairchild, Georgia =

Unincorporated community in Georgia, U.S.

Coordinates: 30°49′29″N 84°54′24″W

Fairchild is an unincorporated community in Seminole County, in the U.S. state of Georgia.

== History ==
A post office called Fairchild was established in 1887, and remained in operation until 1913. According to tradition, the community was named after one Mr. Fairchild, a pioneer citizen. A variant name is "Fairchilds".
