= Donalsonville Municipal Airport =

Donalsonville Municipal Airport Donalsonville Army Auxiliary Airfield
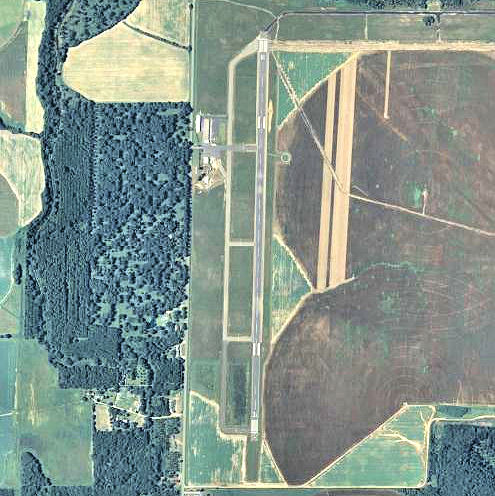
- 2006 USGS airphoto
- IATA: none; ICAO: none; FAA LID: 17J

Summary
- Serves: Donalsonville, Georgia
- Coordinates: 31°00′29″N 084°52′23″W

Map
- Location of Donalsonville Municipal Airport

Runways
Direction	Length		Surface
Direction	ft	m	Surface
01/19	5,182	1,579	asphalt

Donalsonville Municipal Airport is an airport located 2 miles south of Donalsonville, Georgia, United States.

== History ==
Opened in July 1944, during World War II, the airport was used as an auxiliary training airfield for the Army pilot school at Bainbridge Army Airfield. With the end of the war, it was turned over to the city of Donalsonville and developed into a municipal airport.

== See also ==
- Georgia World War II Army Airfields
- List of airports in Georgia (U.S. state)
