= George T. Bagby State Park =

American public park in Georgia

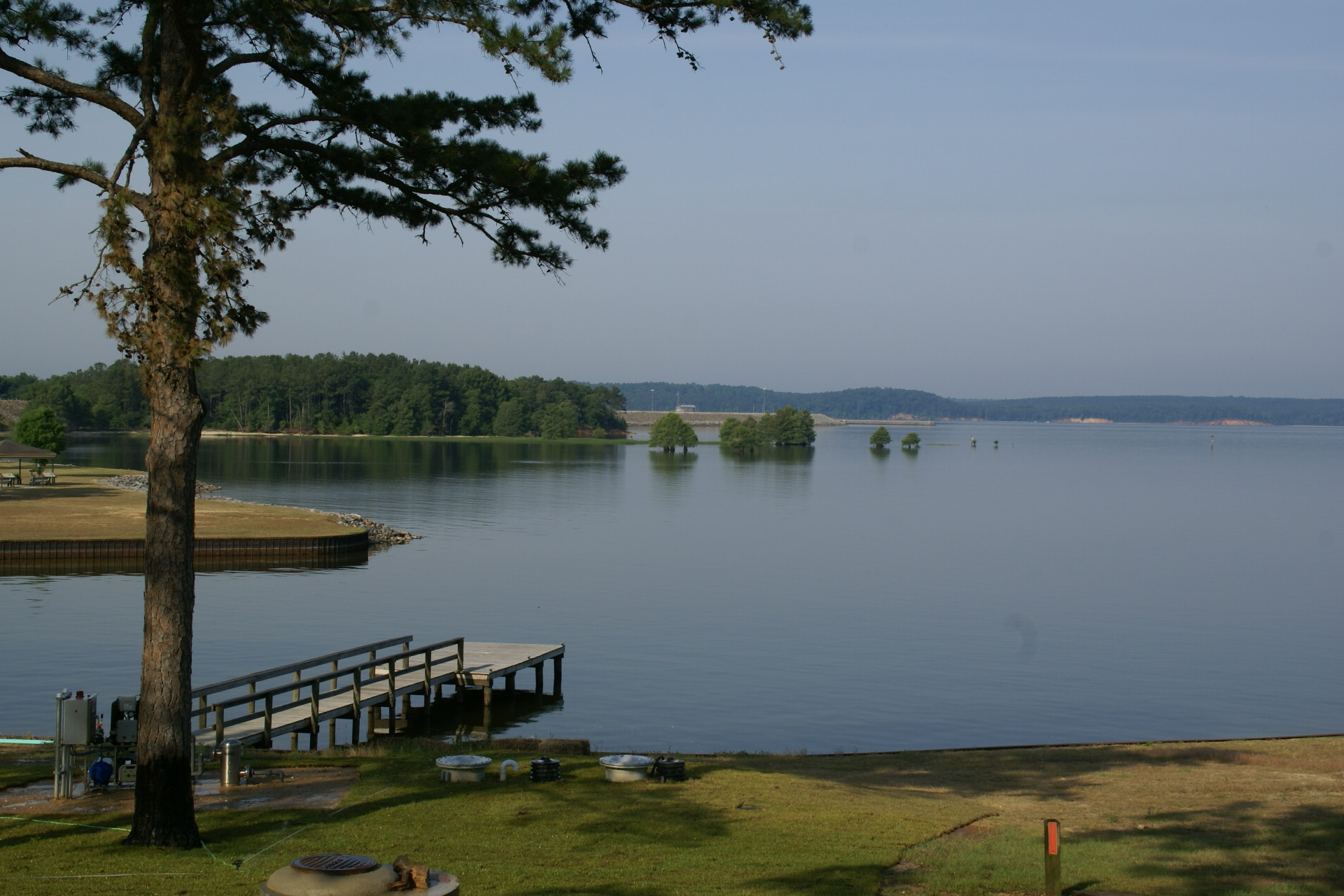
- View from the East Bank

- Location within Georgia
- Location: Clay County, Georgia
- Nearest city: Fort Gaines, Georgia
- Coordinates: 31°39′57.6″N 85°3′25.2″W
- Area: 700 acres (280 ha)

George T. Bagby State Park is a 700-acre (280 ha) state park located in southwestern Georgia on the shore of Walter F. George Lake. The park offers a 60-room lodge, conference center, restaurant, cottages, and features the 18 hole Meadow Links Golf Course, as well as a marina and boat ramp. There is a 3-mile (4.8 km) nature trail, and fishing and boating on Lake Walter F. George.

In 2013, George T. Bagby State Park was privatized and its management handed over to Coral Hospitality, a Florida-based hotel and resort management company. Its official name was changed to George T. Bagby State Park & Lodge.

== Facilities ==
- 700 acres (280 ha)
- 60-room lodge conference center
- Restaurant and courtesy dock
- 5 cottages
- 18-hole Meadow Links Golf Course and Pro Shop
- Tennis courts
- 48,000 acres (190 km^{2}) lake and swimming beach

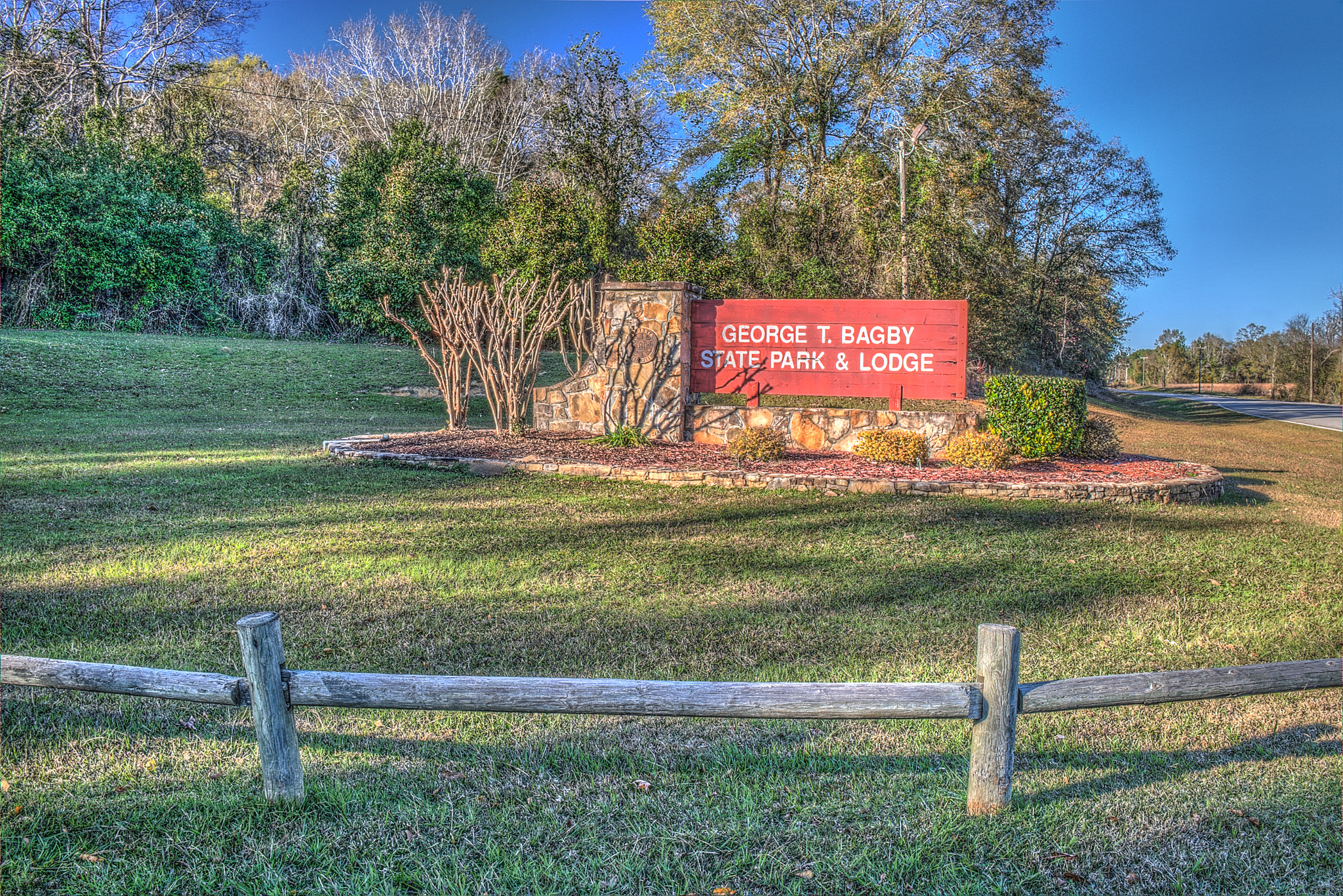
Entrance sign
