= Spring Creek (Flint River tributary) =

Coordinates: 30.80213°N 84.78714°W

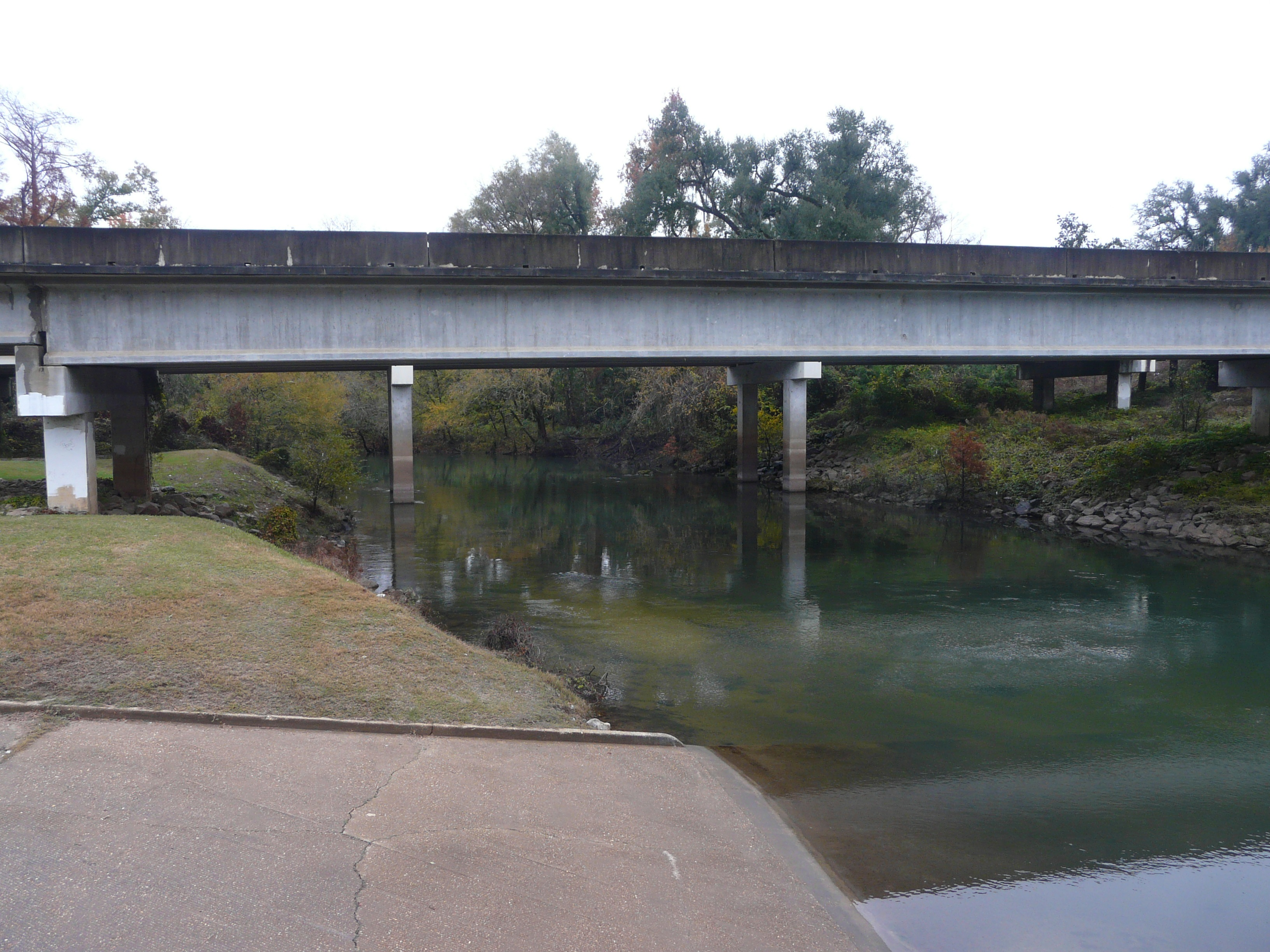
- Spring Creek flowing under U.S. Route 84

Location
- Country: United States

Physical characteristics
- Source
  - location: Georgia

Spring Creek is a 76.5-mile-long (123.1 km) tributary of the Flint River in southwest Georgia in the United States.

Rising in the northeastern corner of Clay County, 5 miles (8 km) north of Bluffton, the creek flows south to join the Flint River in Lake Seminole, approximately 6 miles (10 km) upstream of that river's confluence with the Chattahoochee River to form the Apalachicola River, which flows through Florida to the Gulf of Mexico.

== See also ==
- List of rivers of Georgia
