= Iron City, Georgia =

- Town
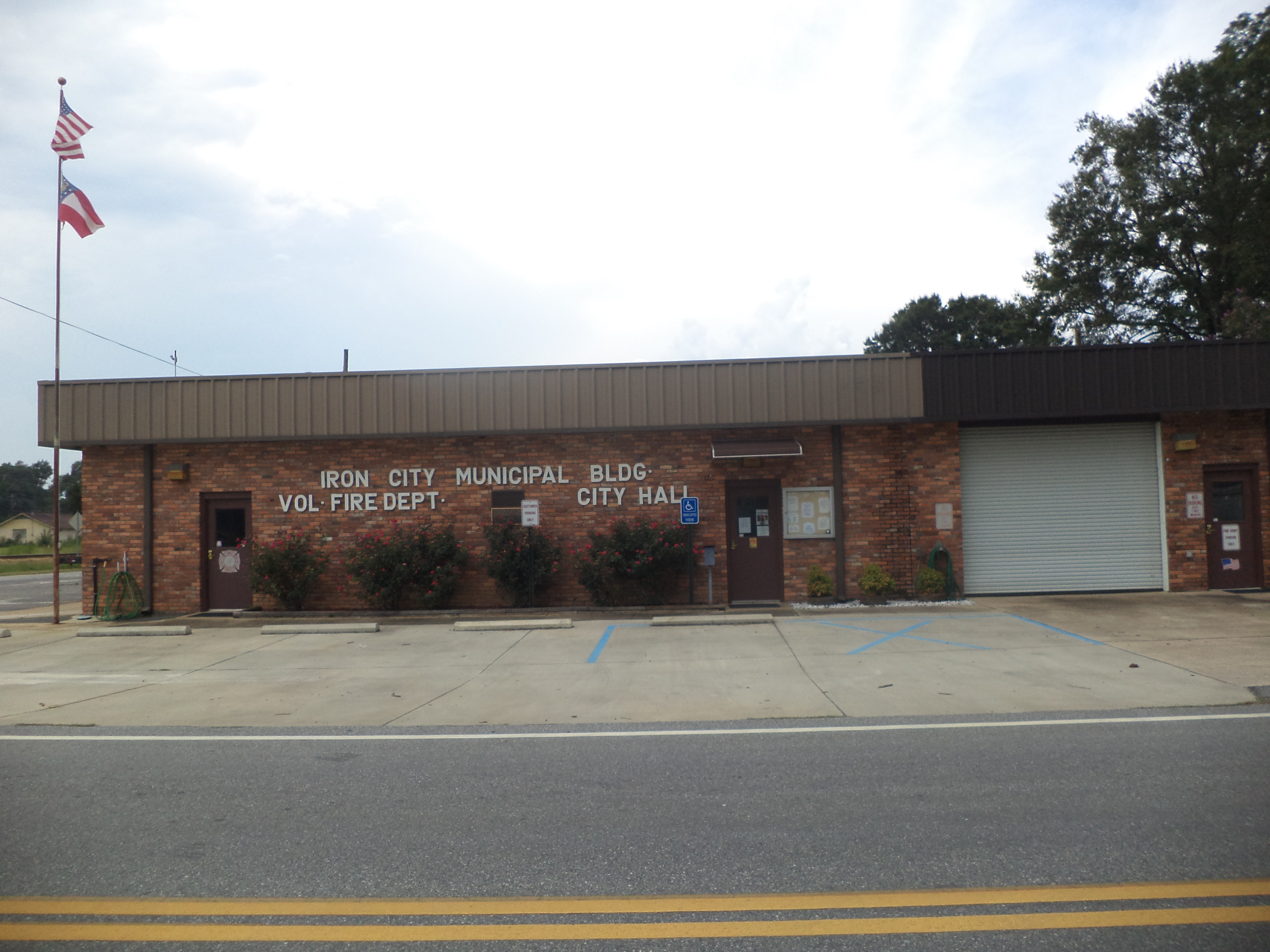
- Iron City City Hall

- Location in Seminole County and the state of Georgia
- Coordinates: 31°0′51″N 84°48′43″W
- Country: United States
- State: Georgia
- County: Seminole

Government
  - Mayor: Zack Conoly

Area
  - Total: 0.80 sq mi (2.07 km^{2})
  - Land: 0.80 sq mi (2.07 km^{2})
  - Water: 0 sq mi (0.00 km^{2})
- Elevation: 144 ft (44 m)

Population (2020)
  - Total: 312
  - Density: 390.7/sq mi (150.86/km^{2})
- Time zone: UTC-5 (Eastern (EST))
  - Summer (DST): UTC-4 (EDT)
- ZIP codes: 31759, 39859
- Area code: 229
- FIPS code: 13-41344
- GNIS feature ID: 0332064

Iron City is a town in Seminole County, Georgia, United States. The population was 312 in 2020.

== Geography ==
Iron City is located at 31°0′51″N 84°48′43″W (31.014217, -84.812070). According to the United States Census Bureau, the town has a total area of 0.8 square miles (2.1 km^{2}) consisting solely of land.

When Iron City was reincorporated in 1908, the corporate limits of the town were to be one half-mile in every direction of the Atlantic Coast Line Railroad Depot, according to the Ladies Club. According to the census data for Iron City, the town has an area of 0.8 square miles (2.1 km^{2}). On the map, Iron City is located at 31.01333 N Latitude and -84.81306 W Longitude. It is 40 miles east of Dothan, Alabama and 17 miles west of Bainbridge.

== Demographics ==
Historical population
Census	Pop.	Note	%±
1910	459		—
1920	496		8.1%
1930	300		−39.5%
1940	289		−3.7%
1950	293		1.4%
1960	298		1.7%
1970	351		17.8%
1980	367		4.6%
1990	503		37.1%
2000	321		−36.2%
2010	310		−3.4%
2020	312		0.6%
U.S. Decennial Census; 1850-1870 1870-1880; 1890-1910 1920-1930; 1940 1950 1960; 1970 1980 1990; 2000 2010

In 2020, the city had a population of 312, down from 321 in 2000.
