= Seminole County, Georgia =

County in Georgia, United States

- County
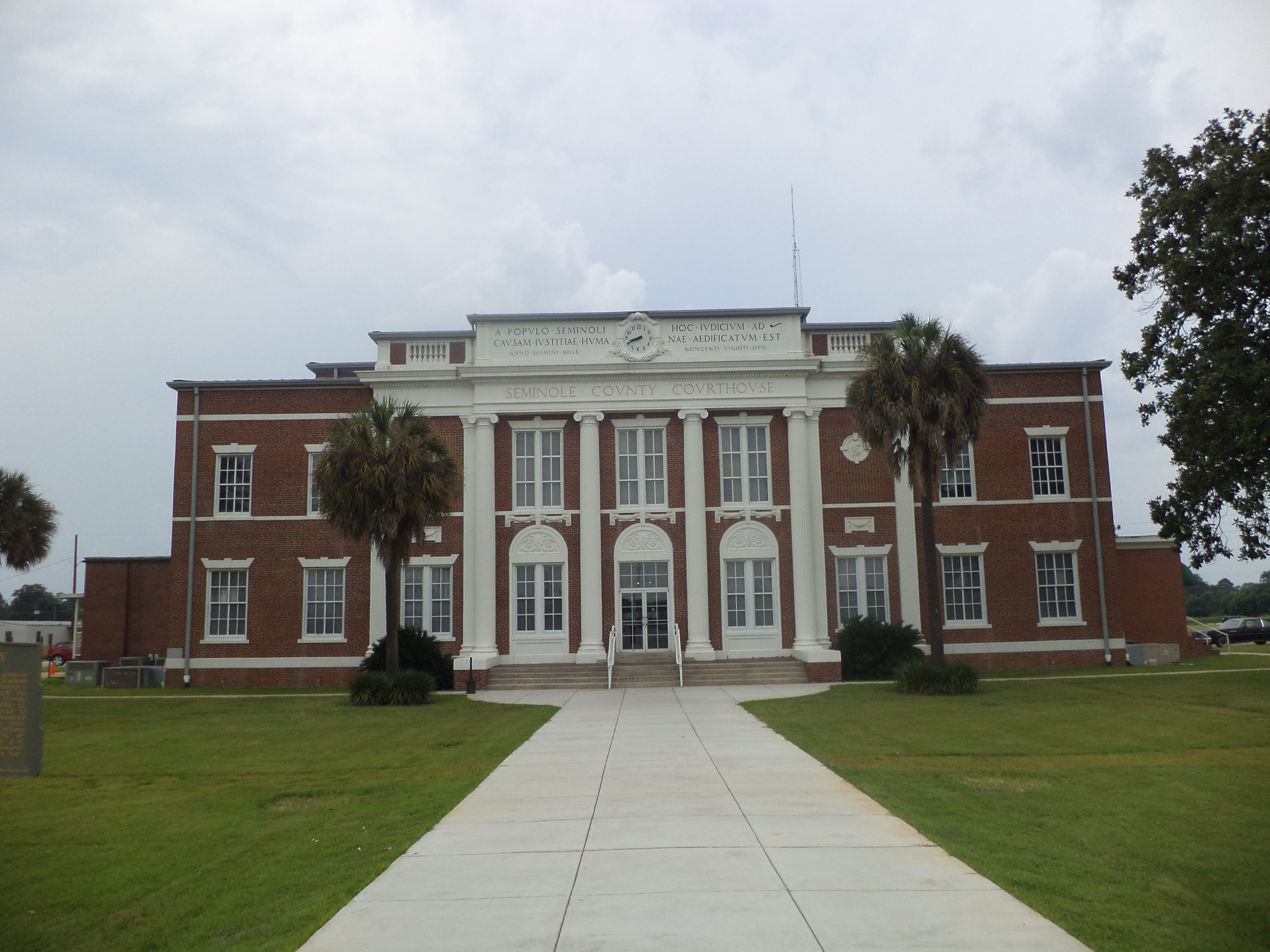
- Seminole County Courthouse in Donalsonville

- Seal Logo

- Location within the U.S. state of Georgia
- Coordinates: 30°56′N 84°52′W
- Country: United States
- State: Georgia
- Founded: November 2, 1920; 105 years ago
- Named for: Seminole tribe
- Seat: Donalsonville
- Largest city: Donalsonville

Area
  - Total: 257 sq mi (670 km^{2})
  - Land: 235 sq mi (610 km^{2})
  - Water: 21 sq mi (54 km^{2}) 8.3%

Population (2020)
  - Total: 9,147
  - Estimate (2025): 9,162 ▲
  - Density: 38.9/sq mi (15.0/km^{2})
- Time zone: UTC−5 (Eastern)
  - Summer (DST): UTC−4 (EDT)
- Congressional district: 2nd
- Website: seminolecountyga.com

Seminole County is a county located in the southwestern corner of U.S. state of Georgia. As of the 2020 census, the population was 9,147. The county seat is Donalsonville.

== History ==
The state constitutional amendment to create the county was proposed July 8, 1920, and ratified November 2. The area for the new county was taken from land which was originally part of Decatur and Early counties. It is named for the Seminole tribe of Native Americans, who once lived in the Chattahoochee River basin within the county, before European settlement forced their move to the Florida Everglades. According to legend, the celebrated Seminole warrior Osceola was born in what is today Seminole County.

== Geography ==
According to the U.S. Census Bureau, the county has a total area of 257 square miles (670 km^{2}), of which 235 square miles (610 km^{2}) is land and 21 square miles (54 km^{2}) (8.3%) is water.

The bulk of Seminole County is located in the Spring Creek sub-basin of the ACF River Basin (Apalachicola-Chattahoochee-Flint River Basin). The county's entire western border with Florida is located in the Lower Chattahoochee River sub-basin of the same ACF River Basin. A tiny southeastern corner of Seminole County, all part of Lake Seminole, is located in the Lower Flint River sub-basin of the same larger ACF River Basin. It is the only county in Georgia that borders both Alabama and Florida.

=== Major highways ===
- U.S. Route 84 / State Route 38
- State Route 39
- State Route 45
- State Route 91
  - State Route 91 Alternate
- State Route 253
- State Route 285
- State Route 374

=== Adjacent counties ===
- Miller County (northeast)
- Decatur County (east)
- Jackson County, Florida (southwest)
- Houston County, Alabama (northwest)
- Early County (north-northwest)

== Communities ==
=== City ===
- Donalsonville (county seat)

=== Town ===
- Iron City

== Demographics ==
Historical population
Census	Pop.	Note	%±
1930	7,389		—
1940	8,492		14.9%
1950	7,904		−6.9%
1960	6,802		−13.9%
1970	7,059		3.8%
1980	9,057		28.3%
1990	9,010		−0.5%
2000	9,369		4.0%
2010	8,729		−6.8%
2020	9,147		4.8%
2025 (est.)	9,162	▲	0.2%
U.S. Decennial Census; 1790-1880 1890-1910; 1920-1930 1930-1940; 1940-1950 1960-1980; 1980-2000 2010 2020

=== Racial and ethnic composition ===
Seminole County, Georgia – Racial and ethnic composition Note: the US Census treats Hispanic/Latino as an ethnic category. This table excludes Latinos from the racial categories and assigns them to a separate category. Hispanics/Latinos may be of any race.
Race / Ethnicity (NH = Non-Hispanic)	Pop 1980	Pop 1990	Pop 2000	Pop 2010	Pop 2020	% 1980	% 1990	% 2000	% 2010	% 2020
White alone (NH)	5,950	5,517	5,734	5,516	5,617	65.70%	61.23%	61.20%	63.19%	61.41%
Black or African American alone (NH)	2,907	2,934	3,224	2,887	2,961	32.10%	32.56%	34.41%	33.07%	32.37%
Native American or Alaska Native alone (NH)	26	19	15	12	6	0.29%	0.21%	0.16%	0.14%	0.07%
Asian alone (NH)	3	10	17	33	61	0.03%	0.11%	0.18%	0.38%	0.67%
Native Hawaiian or Pacific Islander alone (NH)	x	x	0	0	0	x	x	0.00%	0.00%	0.00%
Other race alone (NH)	3	0	0	10	25	0.03%	0.00%	0.00%	0.11%	0.27%
Mixed race or Multiracial (NH)	x	x	32	67	249	x	x	0.34%	0.77%	2.72%
Hispanic or Latino (any race)	168	530	347	204	228	1.85%	5.88%	3.70%	2.34%	2.49%
Total	9,057	9,010	9,369	8,729	9,147	100.00%	100.00%	100.00%	100.00%	100.00%

=== 2020 census ===
As of the 2020 census, the county had a population of 9,147. The median age was 45.7 years. 20.4% of residents were under the age of 18 and 22.6% of residents were 65 years of age or older. For every 100 females there were 95.7 males, and for every 100 females age 18 and over there were 92.1 males age 18 and over. 0.0% of residents lived in urban areas, while 100.0% lived in rural areas. The census also counted 2,162 families residing in the county.

The racial makeup of the county was 61.9% White, 32.7% Black or African American, 0.1% American Indian and Alaska Native, 0.7% Asian, 0.0% Native Hawaiian and Pacific Islander, 1.4% from some other race, and 3.2% from two or more races. Hispanic or Latino residents of any race comprised 2.5% of the population.

There were 3,798 households in the county, of which 27.2% had children under the age of 18 living with them and 32.3% had a female householder with no spouse or partner present. About 30.0% of all households were made up of individuals and 14.9% had someone living alone who was 65 years of age or older.

There were 5,048 housing units, of which 24.8% were vacant. Among occupied housing units, 72.2% were owner-occupied and 27.8% were renter-occupied. The homeowner vacancy rate was 2.6% and the rental vacancy rate was 8.1%.

== Politics ==
As of the 2020s, Seminole County is a Republican stronghold, voting 70% for Donald Trump in 2024. For elections to the United States House of Representatives, Seminole County is part of Georgia's 2nd congressional district, currently represented by Sanford Bishop. For elections to the Georgia State Senate, Seminole County is part of District 11. For elections to the Georgia House of Representatives, Seminole County is part of District 154.

United States presidential election results for Seminole County, Georgia
Year	Republican		Democratic		Third party(ies)	
Year	No.	%	No.	%	No.	%
1924	24	9.80%	201	82.04%	20	8.16%
1928	110	22.87%	371	77.13%	0	0.00%
1932	20	2.48%	776	96.28%	10	1.24%
1936	82	9.73%	761	90.27%	0	0.00%
1940	58	6.13%	884	93.45%	4	0.42%
1944	83	7.16%	1,076	92.84%	0	0.00%
1948	105	11.68%	722	80.31%	72	8.01%
1952	176	13.52%	1,126	86.48%	0	0.00%
1956	129	8.76%	1,343	91.24%	0	0.00%
1960	77	4.65%	1,579	95.35%	0	0.00%
1964	1,294	75.19%	427	24.81%	0	0.00%
1968	201	8.06%	370	14.84%	1,922	77.10%
1972	1,851	83.12%	376	16.88%	0	0.00%
1976	681	24.72%	2,074	75.28%	0	0.00%
1980	1,117	38.04%	1,794	61.10%	25	0.85%
1984	1,636	54.79%	1,350	45.21%	0	0.00%
1988	1,469	55.54%	1,171	44.27%	5	0.19%
1992	850	33.74%	1,193	47.36%	476	18.90%
1996	1,003	39.74%	1,265	50.12%	256	10.14%
2000	1,537	53.42%	1,313	45.64%	27	0.94%
2004	1,977	60.26%	1,278	38.95%	26	0.79%
2008	2,315	57.77%	1,660	41.43%	32	0.80%
2012	2,245	59.44%	1,478	39.13%	54	1.43%
2016	2,345	65.36%	1,189	33.14%	54	1.51%
2020	2,613	67.21%	1,256	32.30%	19	0.49%
2024	2,811	70.15%	1,191	29.72%	5	0.12%

United States Senate election results for Seminole County, Georgia2
Year	Republican		Democratic		Third party(ies)	
Year	No.	%	No.	%	No.	%
2020	2,597	67.67%	1,187	30.93%	54	1.41%
2020	2,351	67.21%	1,147	32.79%	0	0.00%

United States Senate election results for Seminole County, Georgia3
Year	Republican		Democratic		Third party(ies)	
Year	No.	%	No.	%	No.	%
2020	1,263	33.74%	419	11.19%	2,061	55.06%
2020	2,611	67.55%	1,254	32.45%	0	0.00%
2022	2,152	71.19%	827	27.36%	44	1.46%
2022	1,955	71.14%	793	28.86%	0	0.00%

Georgia Gubernatorial election results for Seminole County
Year	Republican		Democratic		Third party(ies)	
Year	No.	%	No.	%	No.	%
2022	2,255	74.06%	773	25.39%	17	0.56%

== Education ==
Public education is provided by the Seminole County School District.

== See also ==
- National Register of Historic Places listings in Seminole County, Georgia
- List of counties in Georgia
