= Southwest Georgia =

Coordinates: 31°20′N 84°10′W

- Region
- Ray Charles Plaza, Albany

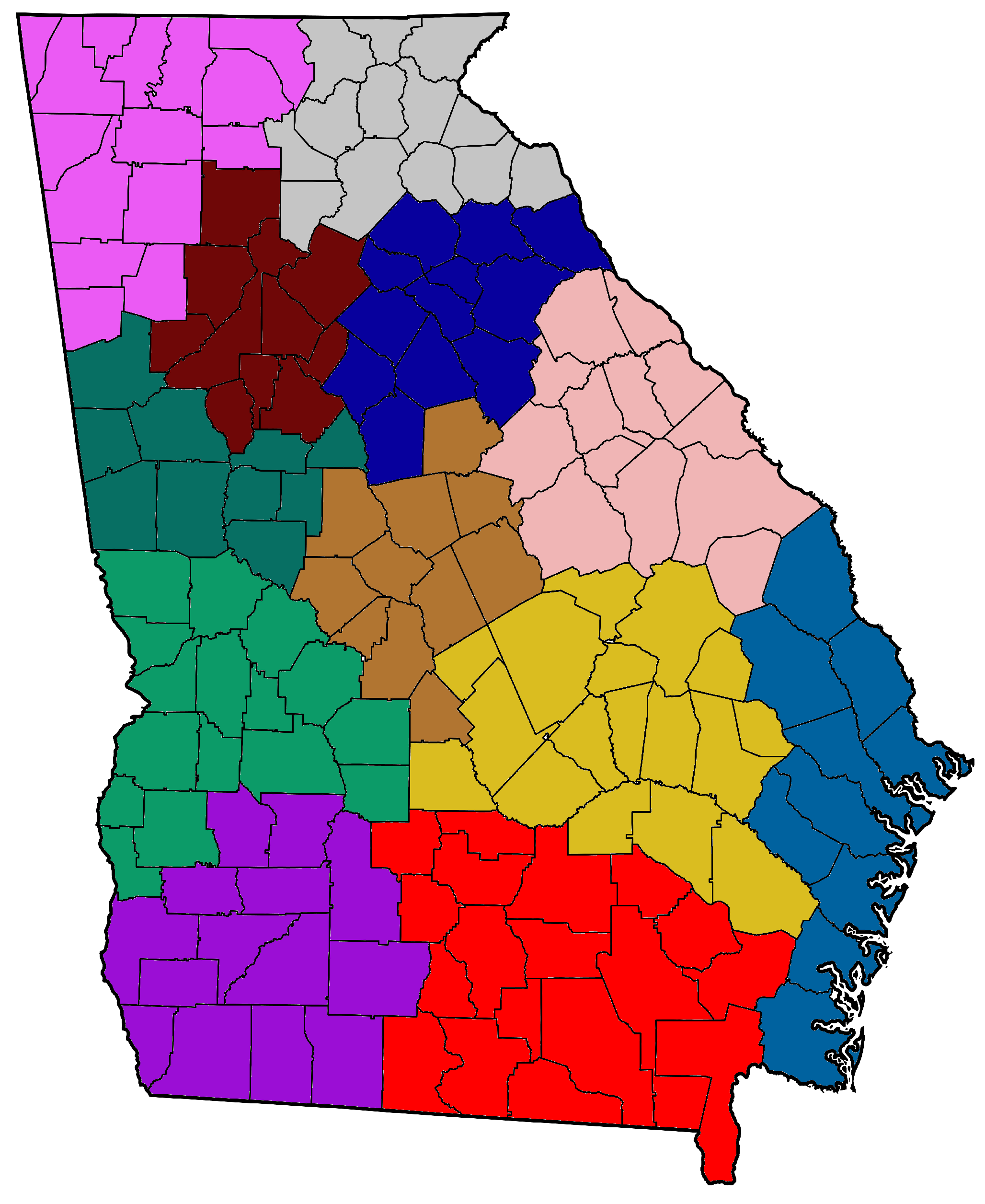
- Southwest Georgia highlighted in purple

- Location of Georgia within the United States
- Country: United States
- State: Georgia
- Largest cities: Albany; Thomasville; Moultrie; Bainbridge; Cairo

Population (2020)
  - Total: 352,426
- Demonym: Southwest Georgian
- Website: georgia.org/regions/southwest-georgia

Southwest Georgia is a fourteen-county region in the U.S. state of Georgia, bordering Alabama and Florida. Colloquially referred to as SOWEGA, the region is anchored by Albany—its most populous city and the region's sole metropolitan statistical area. As of the 2020 United States census, Southwest Georgia's population was 352,426.

== Geography ==
Located in the Deep South, Southwest Georgia borders the U.S. states of Alabama and Florida to its west and south. According to the Georgia Department of Economic Development, Southwest Georgia consists of the following counties: Baker, Calhoun, Colquitt, Decatur, Dougherty, Early, Grady, Lee, Miller, Mitchell, Seminole, Terrell, Thomas, and Worth. The region is home to the Kolomoki Mounds and Seminole State Park.

== Demographics ==
According to the 2020 U.S. census, the counties forming the region's population numbered 352,426. In a separate study by the American Community Survey, the counties forming the Southwest Georgia Regional Commission had a collective population of 347,714 in 2022. Having a predominantly Black and African American population, six of Southwest Georgia's counties form part of the Black Belt in the American South—areas with more than 50% of its racial and ethnic composition identifying as Black and African American.

In terms of religious belief and observance, Southwest Georgia is a part of the largely evangelical Protestant Bible Belt. In common with Southeast Georgia and other regions of the state, Baptists formed the largest Christian constituency as of 2020, with 102,909 adherents spread throughout 7 denominations: the Southern Baptist Convention, National Missionary Baptist Convention, National Baptist Convention, USA, the National Association of Free Will Baptists, Primitive Baptists, the Full Gospel Baptist Church Fellowship, and American Baptist Association. Following, nondenominational Protestants numbered 21,710, according to the Association of Religion Data Archives. Other large groups included Methodists, Catholics, and Pentecostals.

Non-Christian religions and spiritual traditions were a minority in the region, with Hinduism being Southwest Georgia's second-largest religion, followed by Islam and the Baha'i Faith. There is one Hindu temple and 2 mosques throughout the entire region, with its Hindu community making up part of the Bochasanwasi Akshar Purushottam Swaminarayan Sanstha denomination.

In 2022, the American Community Survey estimated the west-central area's median household income was $47,542; north-central's $48,340; and east area's $51,257. Throughout each subdivision of Southwest Georgia, an estimated 24.5% to 25% of the population lived at or below the poverty line.

== Economy ==
According to the Georgia Department of Economic Development, Southwest Georgia's largest industry is the food industry.

== Politics ==
Southwest Georgia is part of Georgia's 2nd congressional district, which is represented in U.S. Congress by Sanford Bishop (D) and has a CPVI of D+6. GA-02 has long been a Democratic stronghold.

== Transportation ==
=== Air ===
- Southwest Georgia Regional Airport

=== Highways ===
- U.S. Route 19
- U.S. Route 27
- U.S. Route 82
- U.S. Route 84
