= Seminole State Park =

State park in Georgia, USA

- IUCN category V (protected landscape/seascape)
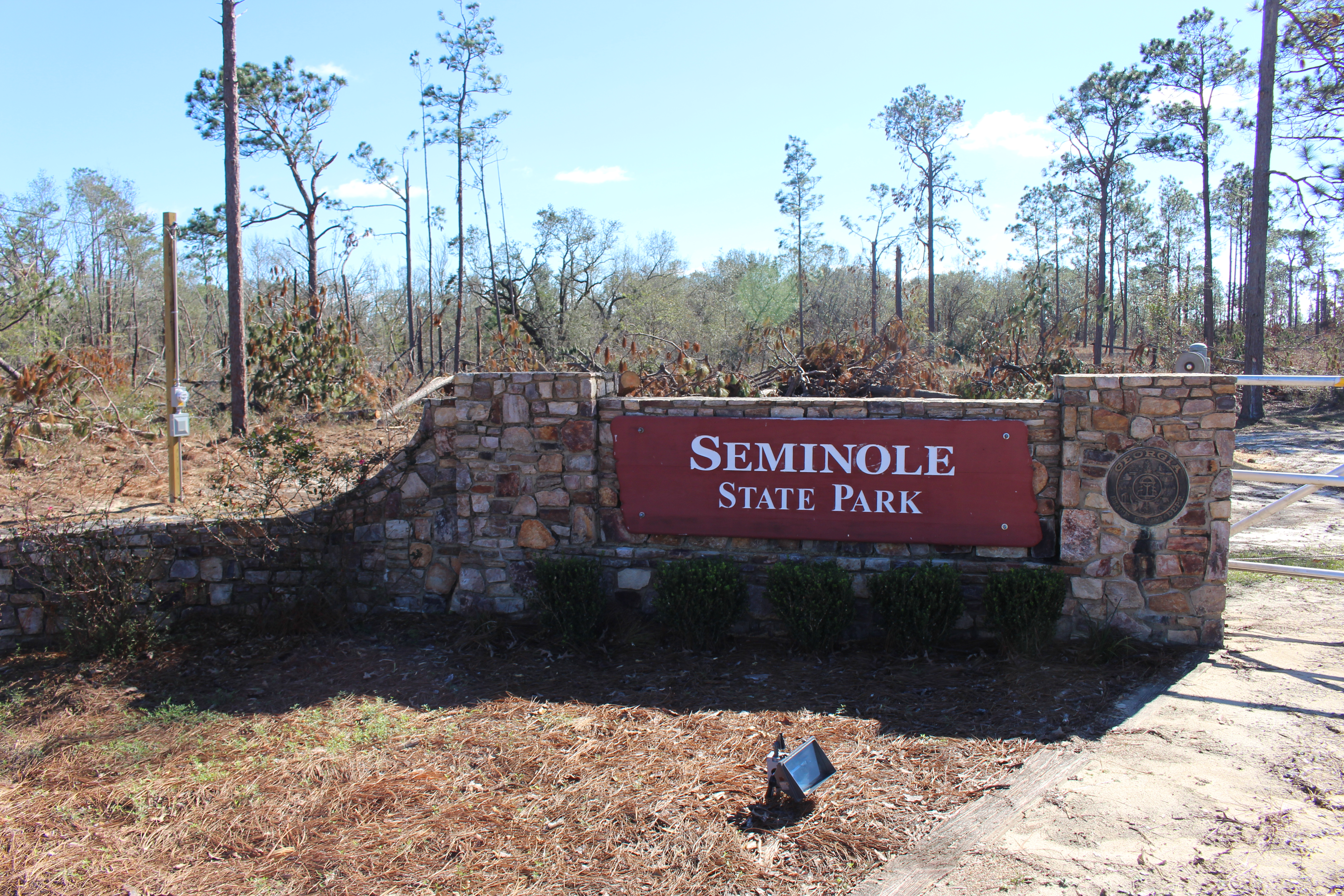
- Seminole State Park sign
- Interactive map of Seminole State Park
- Location: Seminole County, Georgia, U.S.
- Coordinates: 30°48′25″N 84°52′30″W
- Area: 604 acres (2.44 km^{2})
- Operator: Georgia State Parks & Historic Sites
- Website: gastateparks.org/Seminole

Seminole State Park is a 604-acre (2.44 km^{2}) state park located on the shores of Lake Seminole in the extreme southwest corner of Georgia. The park offers excellent fishing opportunities on the lake, as well as a tranquil getaway in one of the park's cottages or campsites. The park also offers a scenic nature trail to experience the forest in the park. The park also offers treehouse camping that sleeps up to fifteen people. The park recently opened a new group shelter that seats up to two hundred people.

== Facilities ==
- 604 acres
- 50 tent, trailer, and RV campsites
- 14 cottages
- Lake and swimming beach
- 5 picnic shelters
- Group shelter (seats 200)
- Pioneer campground
- Gift shop
