= Lake Seminole =

Reservoir in Florida, U.S.

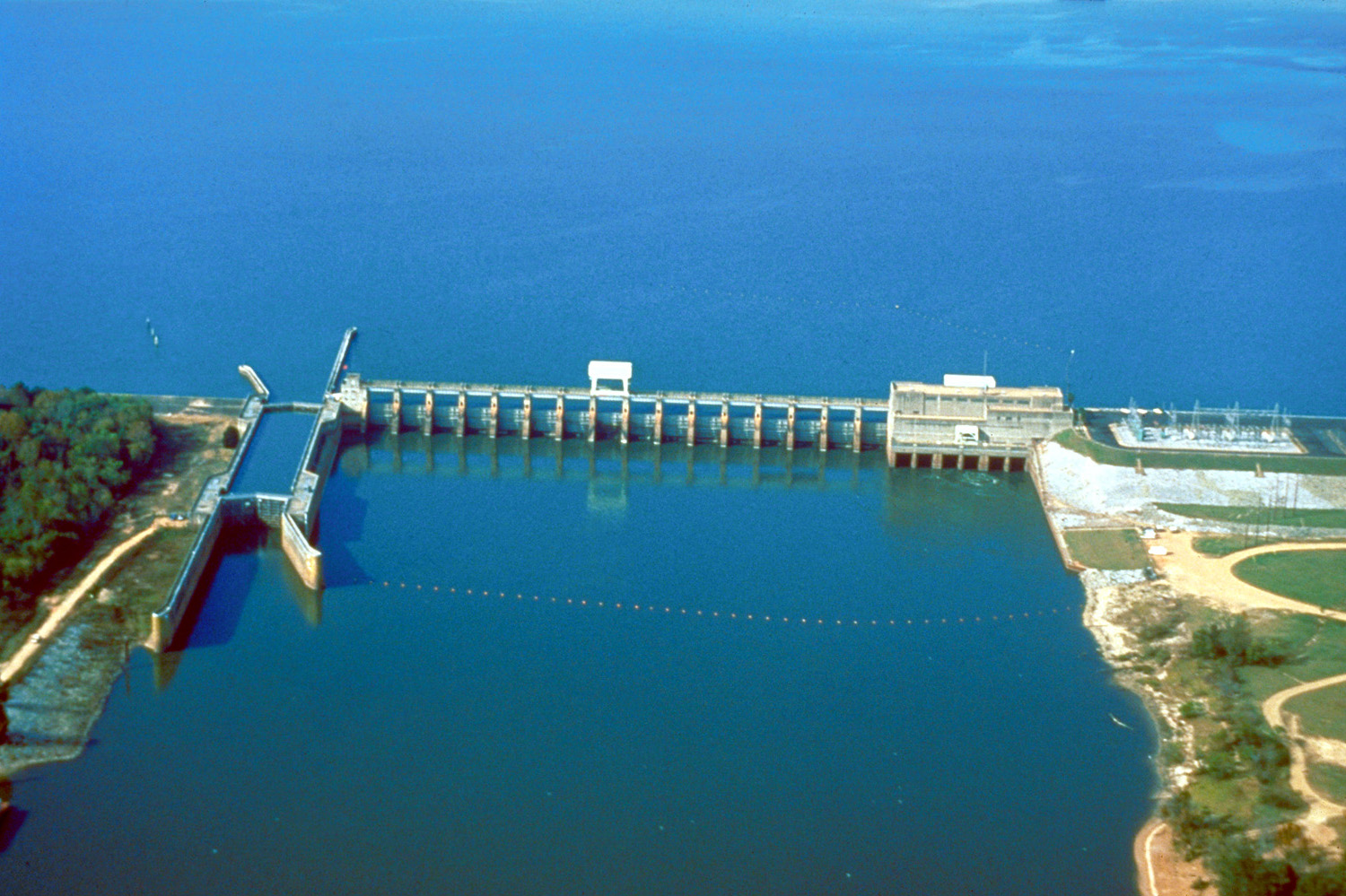
- Jim Woodruff Lock and Dam. This earthen dam is over one mile (1.6 km) long but this photograph shows only the concrete and steel lock and water control structure of the dam. Sneads, FL is on the left and Chattahoochee, FL is on the right.

- Location within Florida Location within the United States
- Location: Georgia–Florida border, United States
- Coordinates: 30°43′12″N 84°52′12″W
- Primary inflows: Chattahoochee, Flint River
- Primary outflows: Apalachicola River
- Catchment area: 17,200 sq mi (44,548 km^{2})
- Basin countries: United States
- Max. length: 35 mi (56 km)
- Max. width: 2 mi (3.2 km)
- Surface area: 37,500 acres (152 km^{2})
- Average depth: 10 ft (3.0 m)
- Max. depth: 30 ft (9.1 m)
- Shore length^{1}: 376 mi (605 km)
- Surface elevation: 77.5 ft (23.6 m)
- ^{1} Shore length is not a well-defined measure.

Lake Seminole (/ˈsɛmɪnoʊl/, SEM-i-nohl) is a reservoir located in the southwest corner of Georgia along its border with Florida, maintained by the U.S. Army Corps of Engineers. The Chattahoochee and Flint rivers join in the lake, before flowing from the Jim Woodruff Lock and Dam, which impounds the lake, as the Apalachicola River. The lake contains 37,500 acres (152 km^{2}) of water, and has a shoreline of 376 mi (605 km). The fish in Lake Seminole include largemouth bass, crappie, chain pickerel, catfish, striped bass and other species. American alligators, snakes and various waterfowl are also present in the lake, which is known for its goose hunting. (Note: For many years, The Canada goose was protected throughout most of Florida, with one exception, it was legal to hunt the goose on Lake Seminole. However, increases in the feral population has led to the season being opened statewide.)

== History ==
Authorized by the United States Congress in the Rivers and Harbors Act of 1946 as the Jim Woodruff Lock and Dam Project, construction began the following year. With the dam completed in 1952, in 1957 the lake was opened. The project was expected to cost $29 million USD, but when completed had required $46.5 million USD. The lake is named after the Seminole Indians.

== Jim Woodruff Dam ==
The Jim Woodruff Dam, located about 1,000 feet (300 m) south of the original confluence of the Chattahoochee River, Flint River and Spring Creek to form the Apalachicola River and with a spillway 2,224 feet (678 m) wide, is a hydroelectric and navigational dam named in honor of James W. Woodruff, Sr., a Georgia businessman who spearheaded the development of the Apalachicola-Chattahoochee-Flint Project.

The dam crosses the state line between Georgia and Florida, with the eastern end of the dam being located in Georgia and the majority, including the locks, gates, spillway, and powerhouse, all being within Florida, just 100 feet south of the southwest corner of Georgia.

== Navigation ==
The Jim Woodruff Dam has a single lock, 450 feet (140 m) in length and 82 feet (25 m) wide, that provides navigational access to the lake and the upstream rivers from the Apalachicola River and Gulf of Mexico. Lake Seminole extends upstream along the Chattahoochee River for 30 miles (48 km) and up the Flint River for 35 miles (56 km).

== Parks ==
The U.S. Army Corps of Engineers maintains 10 parks along the shore of the lake, with 35 parks in total available for recreation, including five campgrounds. Seminole State Park covers 604 acres (244 ha) of lakeshore in Georgia, while Three Rivers State Park covers 686 acres (278 ha) of wetland north of Sneads, Florida.

== San Carlos de los Chacatos ==
The West Bank Overlook at the western end of the dam is the location of the Spanish mission San Carlos de los Chacatos, established in 1674 following a revolt by the Chacato. Used by both Marcos Delgado and Don Laureano de Torres y Ayala on their expeditions, the mission was attacked by Alibamu warriors in 1696, then later by English forces led by Colonel James Moore during Queen Anne's War and abandoned.

Resettled during the Creek War in 1813 by Uchee refugees, the site was abandoned again in 1818 during the First Seminole War, and was not rediscovered until 1948 during archaeological work by the Florida Park Service supporting the construction of Lake Seminole.

== Fort Scott ==
Fort Scott was built in 1816 on the west bank of the Flint River, just before it empties into the Apalachicola. The intent was to protect what was then the southern border of the United States (the border between Georgia and Florida), subject to various types of invaders operating through or out of Spanish territory. The Fort was abandoned after Florida became a U.S. territory in 1821 and there was no longer a border to defend. The area around the site was flooded due to the creation of the lake, thus the land which the fort resided became an island.

== Notes ==
Lake Seminole is known for its large bass fishing during the summer and duck hunting in the early winter. It has also been a location of preference for the well-renowned Bass Anglers Sportsman Society (B.A.S.S.) fishing tournaments.
