= Donalsonville, Georgia =

City in Georgia, United States

- City
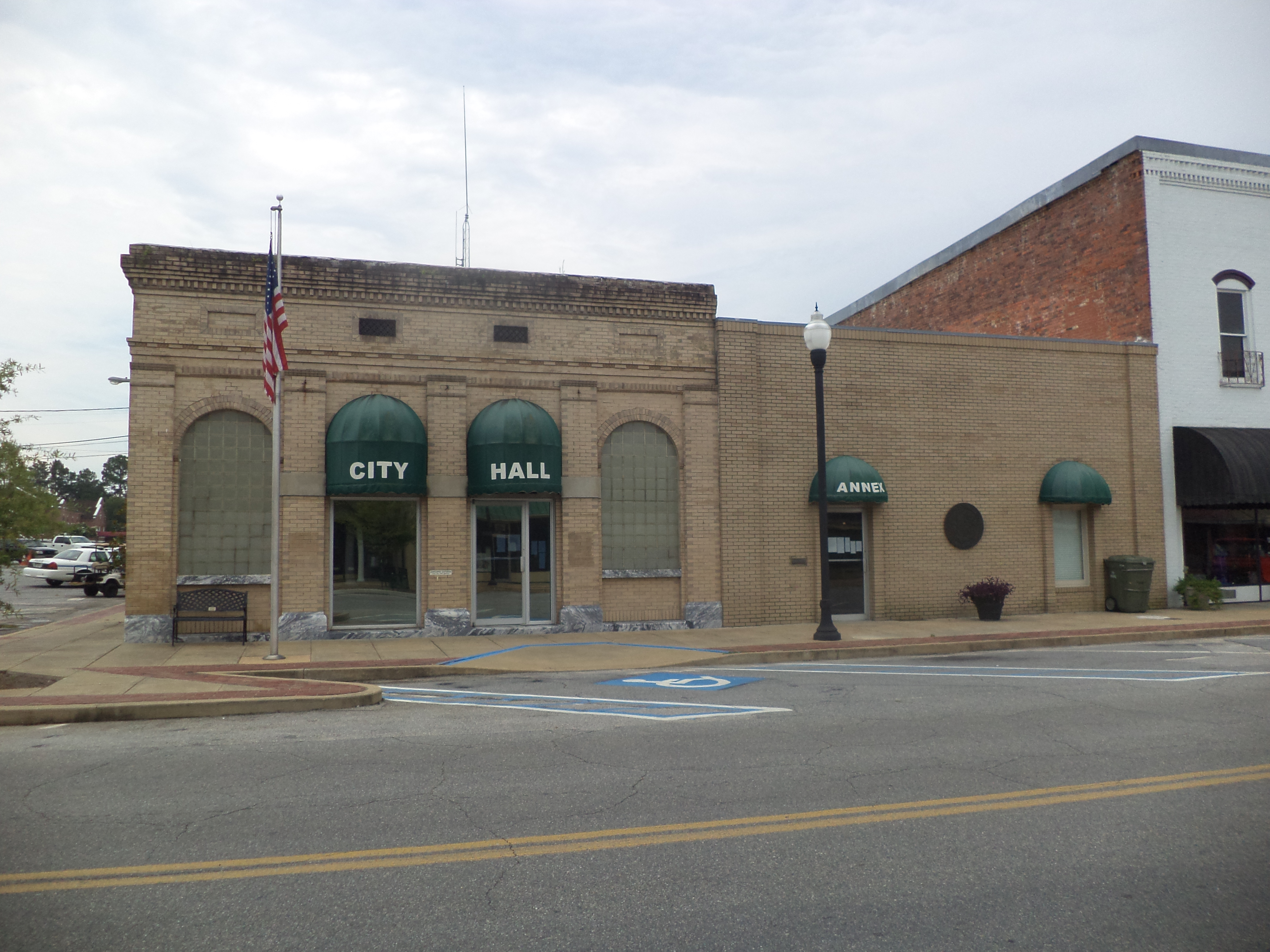
- Donalsonville City Hall

- Flag Seal
- Motto: The Gateway to Lake Seminole
- Location in Seminole County and the state of Georgia
- Coordinates: 31°2′27″N 84°52′42″W
- Country: United States
- State: Georgia
- County: Seminole

Government
  - Type: Council-Manager
  - Mayor: Twynette Reynolds

Area
  - Total: 3.99 sq mi (10.34 km^{2})
  - Land: 3.97 sq mi (10.29 km^{2})
  - Water: 0.019 sq mi (0.05 km^{2})
- Elevation: 148 ft (45 m)

Population (2020)
  - Total: 2,833
  - Density: 713.4/sq mi (275.43/km^{2})
- Time zone: UTC−5 (Eastern (EST))
  - Summer (DST): UTC−4 (EDT)
- ZIP Codes: 39845
- Area code: 229
- FIPS code: 13-23368
- GNIS feature ID: 0331568
- Website: donalsonvillega.org

Donalsonville is a city in and the county seat of Seminole County, Georgia, United States. The population was 2,833 in 2020.

== History ==
Donalsonville was originally part of Decatur County. It is named after John Ernest Donalson (1846–1920), also known as Jonathan or John E. Donalson, a prominent businessman of the area. Donalson built the first lumber mill in Donalsonville, Donalson Lumber Company. He also built homes and a commissary for the workers of the mill. The lumber company paved the way for the town's growth.

Donalsonville was first chartered as a town in Georgia on December 8, 1897. When Seminole County was formed in January 1920, Donalsonville was named as its county seat. By August 1922, the Town of Donalsonville became known as the City of Donalsonville, with the charter passing on August 19, 1922.

The Seminole County Courthouse was erected in 1922 and is still standing today. The Courthouse is listed on the National Register of Historic Places.

== Geography ==
Donalsonville is located at 31°2′27″N 84°52′42″W.

According to the United States Census Bureau, the city has a total area of 4.0 square miles (10 km^{2}), of which 4.0 square miles (10 km^{2}) is land and 0.25% is water. The city is located 20 minutes north of Lake Seminole, 62 miles (100 km) south of Albany, 36 miles (58 km) east of Dothan, Alabama and 107 miles (172 km) west of Valdosta.

=== Climate ===
Climate data for Donalsonville, Georgia, 1991–2020 normals, extremes 2001–present
Month	Jan	Feb	Mar	Apr	May	Jun	Jul	Aug	Sep	Oct	Nov	Dec	Year
Record high °F (°C)	83 (28)	86 (30)	91 (33)	95 (35)	101 (38)	107 (42)	104 (40)	105 (41)	102 (39)	97 (36)	91 (33)	84 (29)	107 (42)
Mean maximum °F (°C)	77.6 (25.3)	80.2 (26.8)	86.2 (30.1)	90.6 (32.6)	96.2 (35.7)	100.2 (37.9)	99.5 (37.5)	99.9 (37.7)	97.5 (36.4)	92.6 (33.7)	84.7 (29.3)	80.2 (26.8)	101.6 (38.7)
Mean daily maximum °F (°C)	59.0 (15.0)	64.5 (18.1)	71.5 (21.9)	77.8 (25.4)	85.4 (29.7)	89.4 (31.9)	91.3 (32.9)	91.0 (32.8)	87.2 (30.7)	79.9 (26.6)	69.8 (21.0)	62.3 (16.8)	77.4 (25.2)
Daily mean °F (°C)	49.0 (9.4)	53.7 (12.1)	59.7 (15.4)	66.4 (19.1)	74.4 (23.6)	80.1 (26.7)	82.0 (27.8)	81.8 (27.7)	77.4 (25.2)	68.6 (20.3)	58.2 (14.6)	52.1 (11.2)	67.0 (19.4)
Mean daily minimum °F (°C)	38.9 (3.8)	42.9 (6.1)	48.0 (8.9)	55.0 (12.8)	63.4 (17.4)	70.9 (21.6)	72.7 (22.6)	72.6 (22.6)	67.6 (19.8)	57.3 (14.1)	46.6 (8.1)	42.0 (5.6)	56.5 (13.6)
Mean minimum °F (°C)	23.4 (−4.8)	28.3 (−2.1)	33.3 (0.7)	42.1 (5.6)	52.9 (11.6)	65.7 (18.7)	67.4 (19.7)	67.4 (19.7)	56.4 (13.6)	42.3 (5.7)	30.6 (−0.8)	28.8 (−1.8)	22.5 (−5.3)
Record low °F (°C)	18 (−8)	21 (−6)	24 (−4)	34 (1)	45 (7)	59 (15)	60 (16)	62 (17)	46 (8)	34 (1)	23 (−5)	19 (−7)	18 (−8)
Average precipitation inches (mm)	4.79 (122)	4.84 (123)	5.26 (134)	4.48 (114)	3.15 (80)	5.81 (148)	6.13 (156)	5.69 (145)	5.37 (136)	3.10 (79)	3.61 (92)	4.70 (119)	56.93 (1,448)
Average precipitation days (≥ 0.01 in)	7.8	6.9	5.8	5.9	6.8	9.9	11.1	10.9	6.3	5.2	5.4	8.2	90.2
Source 1: NOAA
Source 2: National Weather Service (mean maxima/minima, precip days 2006–2020)

== Demographics ==
Historical population
Census	Pop.	Note	%±
1900	519		—
1910	747		43.9%
1920	1,031		38.0%
1930	1,183		14.7%
1940	1,718		45.2%
1950	2,569		49.5%
1960	2,621		2.0%
1970	2,907		10.9%
1980	3,320		14.2%
1990	2,761		−16.8%
2000	2,796		1.3%
2010	2,650		−5.2%
2020	2,833		6.9%
U.S. Decennial Census; 1850–1870 1870–1880; 1890–1910 1920–1930; 1940 1950 1960; 1970 1980 1990; 2000 2010

=== 2020 census ===
As of the 2020 census, Donalsonville had a population of 2,833. The median age was 39.1 years. 25.3% of residents were under the age of 18 and 16.8% of residents were 65 years of age or older. For every 100 females there were 86.4 males, and for every 100 females age 18 and over there were 77.9 males age 18 and over.

0.0% of residents lived in urban areas, while 100.0% lived in rural areas.

There were 1,088 households in Donalsonville, of which 35.4% had children under the age of 18 living in them. Of all households, 27.5% were married-couple households, 19.7% were households with a male householder and no spouse or partner present, and 46.9% were households with a female householder and no spouse or partner present. About 33.4% of all households were made up of individuals and 13.5% had someone living alone who was 65 years of age or older. As of the 2020 census, there were 542 families residing in the city.

There were 1,290 housing units, of which 15.7% were vacant. The homeowner vacancy rate was 2.1% and the rental vacancy rate was 8.7%.

Racial composition as of the 2020 census
Race	Number	Percent
White	910	32.1%
Black or African American	1,753	61.9%
American Indian and Alaska Native	2	0.1%
Asian	60	2.1%
Native Hawaiian and Other Pacific Islander	1	0.0%
Some other race	47	1.7%
Two or more races	60	2.1%
Hispanic or Latino (of any race)	82	2.9%

== Economy ==
Donalsonville has about a 63% high school graduate rate with about 52% in the work force. The biggest industries are education, health, and social services. (Georgia.gov) The average median income for households according to the U.S. Census report in 2000 was $20,687 and median family income was $25,679, with the average household size around 2 and family size around 3 people.

According to 2012 data from the Donalsonville Chamber of Commerce, the top five employers in the city are as follows:

Employer	Employees
Donalsonville Hospital, Inc.	350
Ponder Enterprises Inc.	250
Lewis M. Carter, Inc.	150
American Peanut Growers Group, LLC	80
JH Harvey Company	30

== Education ==
The Seminole County School District holds pre-school to grade twelve, and consists of one elementary school and one middle-high school. The district has 120 full-time teachers and over 1,754 students.

- Seminole County Elementary School
- Seminole County Middle/High School

=== Public library ===
Donalsonville is home to the Seminole County Public Library.

== Alday family murders ==
Donalsonville was the site of the second largest mass murder in Georgia history (the largest being the Woolfolk murders in 1887). On May 14, 1973, Carl Isaacs, his half brother Wayne Coleman, and fellow prisoner George Dungee escaped from the Maryland State Prison. They were later joined by Carl's younger brother, 15-year-old Billy Isaacs. While en route to Florida the men came upon the Alday farm in Donalsonville. They stopped at a mobile home owned by Jerry Alday and his wife Mary, to look for gas as there was a gas pump on the property.

Jerry Alday and his father Ned Alday arrived as the trailer was being ransacked and were ordered inside, then shot to death in separate bedrooms. Jerry's brother Jimmy arrived at the trailer on a tractor and he too was led inside and forced to lay on a couch, then shot. Later, Jerry's 25-year-old wife Mary arrived at the trailer as the men attempted to hide the tractor. She was restrained, while Jerry's brother Chester and uncle Aubrey arrived in a pickup truck. The criminals accosted the pair still in their truck and forced them inside the trailer where they were also shot to death. Mary Alday was raped on her kitchen table before being taken out to a wooded area miles away where she was raped again and then finally murdered.

Billy Isaacs cooperated with prosecutors and received a forty-year sentence for armed robbery and burglary. Carl Isaacs, Coleman, and Dungee were tried by jury in Seminole County in 1973, convicted, and sentenced to death. All three convictions and sentences were overturned by the U.S. Court of Appeals for the 11th Circuit in 1985, on the grounds that the pool of local jurors had been tainted by excess pretrial publicity. All three defendants were re-tried in 1988 and were again convicted; however, only Carl Isaacs was sentenced to death, Coleman and Dungee receiving life sentences.

Carl Isaacs was executed on May 6, 2003, at Georgia Diagnostic and Classification State Prison in Jackson, by lethal injection. At the time of his execution, aged 49, he was the longest-serving death row inmate anywhere in the US, having spent 30 years on death row prior to execution.

Billy Isaacs was released from prison in 1993, and died in Florida on May 4, 2009. George Dungee died in prison on April 4, 2006. Only Wayne Coleman remains incarcerated (as of 2023).

The murders were the subject on an award-winning 1977 documentary called Murder One directed by Fleming 'Tex' Fuller. Fuller then wrote a screenplay, which was filmed as the 1988 film, Murder One, starring Henry Thomas. The 1988 film was widely released in North America, but it wasn't released in southwest Georgia near where the killings took place, so as not to offend people.

Janice Daugharty published a fictionalized account of the murders, Going to Jackson (2010, ).

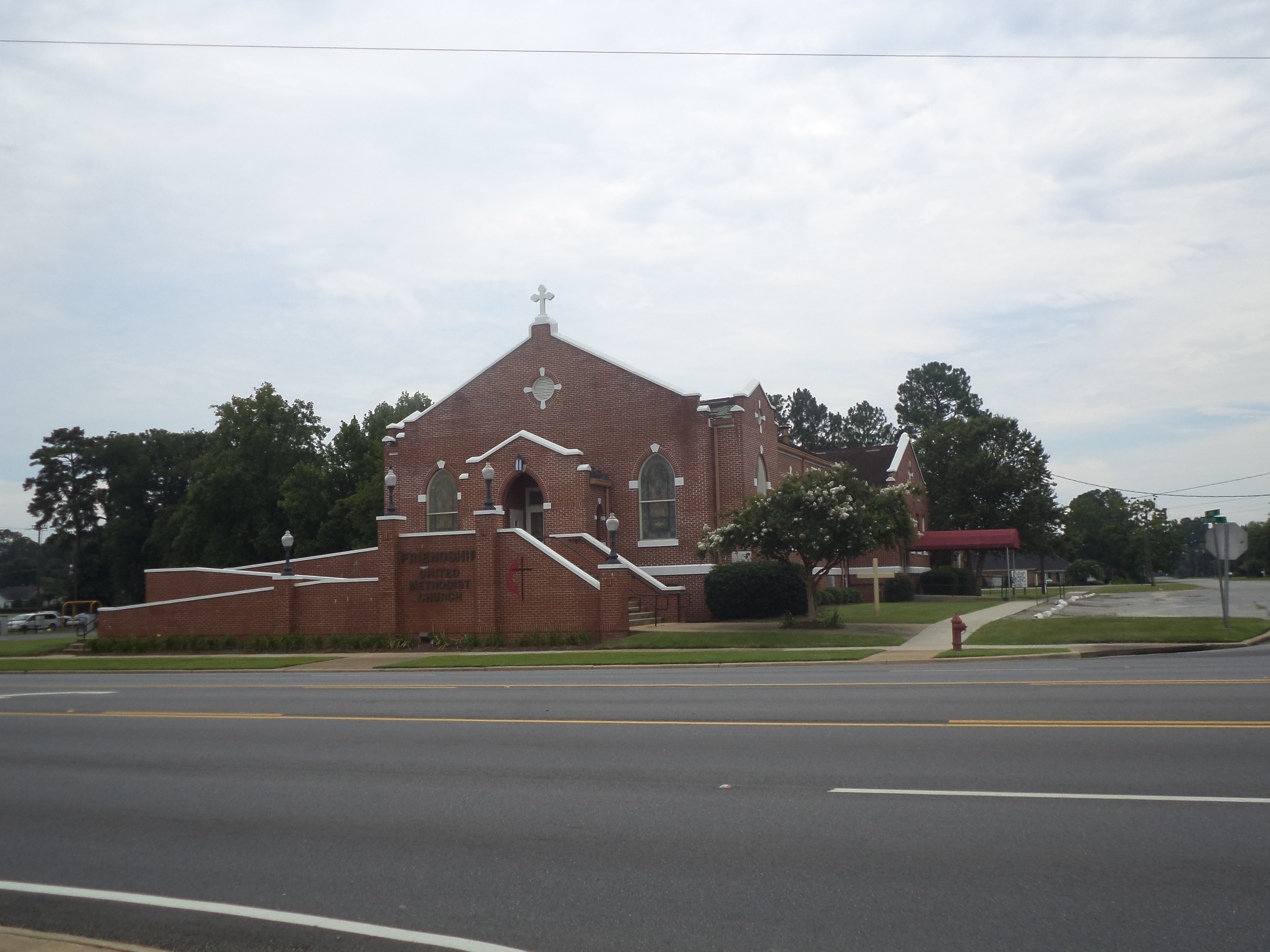
Friendship United Methodist Church

== Religion ==
By the 1900s, the need for churches arose. The first church was erected in Donalsonville in 1850, the Friendship United Methodist Church. In the beginning the Methodist Church served as a meeting place for all Protestant denominations. Later, the First Presbyterian Church of Donalsonville was established in January 1898 with 25 members. On August 4, 1902, 18 people helped to create the First Baptist Church of Donalsonville. The Church of The Nazarene, originally called "The Holiness Church," was established in October 1902. The meetings of the Church of the Nazarene were actually held in a member's house until 1903, when a building was erected. The first black church in Donalsonville was created in 1895, the Live Oak African Methodist Episcopal Church. Eventually, the number totalled thirteen.

== Notable people ==
- John and Clarence Anglin – brothers who escaped from Alcatraz prison in 1962
- Alfred Corn, poet and essayist, born Bainbridge and lived in Donalsonville and Valdosta
- Bacarri Rambo – former Miami Dolphins safety
- Phillip Daniels – former NFL player, current Assistant Defensive Line Coach for the Philadelphia Eagles
