= Chattahoochee Industrial Railroad =

Class III railroad in Georgia, US

Overview
- Headquarters: Cedar Springs, Georgia
- Reporting mark: CIRR
- Locale: Georgia
- Dates of operation: 1961–2025

Technical
- Track gauge: 4 ft 8 1/2 in (1,435 mm) standard gauge
- Length: 15 mi (24 km)

Other
- Website: https://www.gwrr.com/cirr/

Chattahoochee Industrial Railroad (reporting mark CIRR) is a class III railroad located in southern Georgia.

It connects Cedar Springs, Hilton and Saffold over a 15-mile route, interconnecting with CSX Corporation and the Hilton & Albany Railroad.

CIRR primarily serves Georgia-Pacific's Cedar Springs mill, a large containerboard facility. In 2002, CIRR hauled 19,561 carloads; most of them were paper pulp, and coal. It was previously a Georgia Pacific subsidiary until 2004, when Georgia Pacific sold it and other railroad properties to Genesee & Wyoming Inc. As of August 2025 the railroad has been closed due to the Georgia Pacific plant closing. And the other industry job on the line has been changed over to the Hilton and Albany railroad. CIRR assets are now classed as owned by the Bay Line Railroad.
