= National Register of Historic Places listings in Early County, Georgia =

This is a list of properties and districts in Early County, Georgia that are listed on the National Register of Historic Places (NRHP).

This National Park Service list is complete through NPS recent listings posted March 21, 2025.

== Current listings ==
	Name on the Register	Image	Date listed	Location	City or town	Description
1	Bank of Jakin	Bank of Jakin	July 25, 2003 (#03000678)	135 S. Pearl St. 31°05′23″N 84°58′59″W	Jakin	Later used as city hall
2	Blakely Court Square Historic District	Blakely Court Square Historic District	May 9, 2002 (#02000452)	Bounded by Powell St., Smith Ave., and Church and Bay Sts. 31°22′38″N 84°56′02″W	Blakely	
3	James and Clara Butler House		January 11, 2002 (#01001430)	College St. 31°22′45″N 84°56′27″W	Blakely	
4	Coheelee Creek Covered Bridge	Coheelee Creek Covered Bridge	May 13, 1976 (#76000617)	2 mi. N of Hilton on Old River Rd. 31°18′23″N 85°04′43″W	Hilton	
5	Early County Courthouse	Early County Courthouse	September 18, 1980 (#80001015)	Courthouse Sq. 31°22′39″N 84°56′03″W	Blakely	
6	Jane Donalson Harrell House	Jane Donalson Harrell House	June 17, 1982 (#82002407)	SR 1975 off U.S. 84; 31°05′02″N 84°59′46″W	Jakin	
7	Kolomoki Mounds	Kolomoki Mounds	October 15, 1966 (#66000280)	8 mi. N of Blakely on U.S. 27, Kolomoki Mounds State Park; 31°28′02″N 84°56′31″W	Blakely	National Historic Landmark and a Georgia state historic site
