= Colomokee, Georgia =

Unincorporated community in Georgia, U.S.

Coordinates: 31°27′38″N 84°52′46″W

Colomokee is an unincorporated community in Early County, in the U.S. state of Georgia.

== History ==
A post office called Colomokee was established in 1896, and remained in operation until 1905. A variant name was "Kolomoki". The community takes its name from Kolomoki Creek.

== See also ==
- Kolomoki Mounds
