= Georgia State Route 370 =

Highway in Georgia

State Route 370
- SR 370 highlighted in red

Route information
- Maintained by GDOT
- Length: 12.6 mi (20.3 km)
- Existed: 1970–present

Major junctions
- South end: US 84 / SR 38 northwest of Jakin
- SR 273 / SR 273 Spur southwest of Cedar Springs
- North end: SR 62 in Hilton

Location
- Country: United States
- State: Georgia
- County: Early

Highway system
- Georgia State Highway System; Interstate; US; State; Special
← SR 369	→ SR 371

State Route 370 (SR 370) is a 12.6-mile-long (20.3 km) north–south state highway located entirely within Early County in the southwestern part of the U.S. state of Georgia. It travels parallel to the Chattahoochee River for its entire length. The southernmost 1.5 miles (2.4 km) is part of the Blakely Highway. The rest of the highway is known as Great Southern Highway. The roadway's construction began in the early 1960s. Later that decade, the Blakely Highway section was included as part of former SR 363. In 1970, the road was designated as SR 370.

== Route description ==
SR 370 begins at an intersection with US 84/SR 38 (Hugh D. Broome Sr. Parkway) northwest of Jakin. Approximately 4.6 miles (7.4 km) north-northwest of the southern terminus, SR 370 intersects the western terminus of SR 273 (Paper Mill Parkway) and the eastern terminus of SR 273 Spur. Finally, the route curves to a nearly due north routing and meets its northern terminus, an intersection with SR 62 (Columbia Highway) in Hilton. SR 370 is the first and last state route on State Route 62 and 84.

SR 370 is not part of the National Highway System, a system of roadways important to the nation's economy, defense, and mobility.

== History ==
The road that would eventually become SR 370 was built between 1960 and 1963 from its current southern terminus to approximately 1.5 miles (2.4 km) north of that point. In 1967, this entire segment was designated as part of SR 363. In 1970, SR 370 was designated along its current length from approximately 1.5 miles (2.4 km) north of its current southern terminus to its current northern terminus. It is unclear if it traveled concurrent with SR 363 south of the southern end of this segment. Between 1984 and 1986, SR 363 was decommissioned. SR 370 was designated along its current length.

== Major intersections ==
The entire route is in Early County.

Location	mi	km	Destinations	Notes
Saffold	0.0	0.0	US 84 / SR 38 (Hugh D. Broome, Sr. Parkway)	Southern terminus
	4.6	7.4	SR 273 east (Paper Mill Parkway) / SR 273 Spur west – Georgia-Pacific factory, Cedar Springs	Western terminus of SR 273; eastern terminus of SR 273 Spur
Hilton	12.6	20.3	SR 62 (Columbia Highway) – Columbia, Blakely	Northern terminus
1.000 mi = 1.609 km; 1.000 km = 0.621 mi
