= Hilton and Albany Railroad =

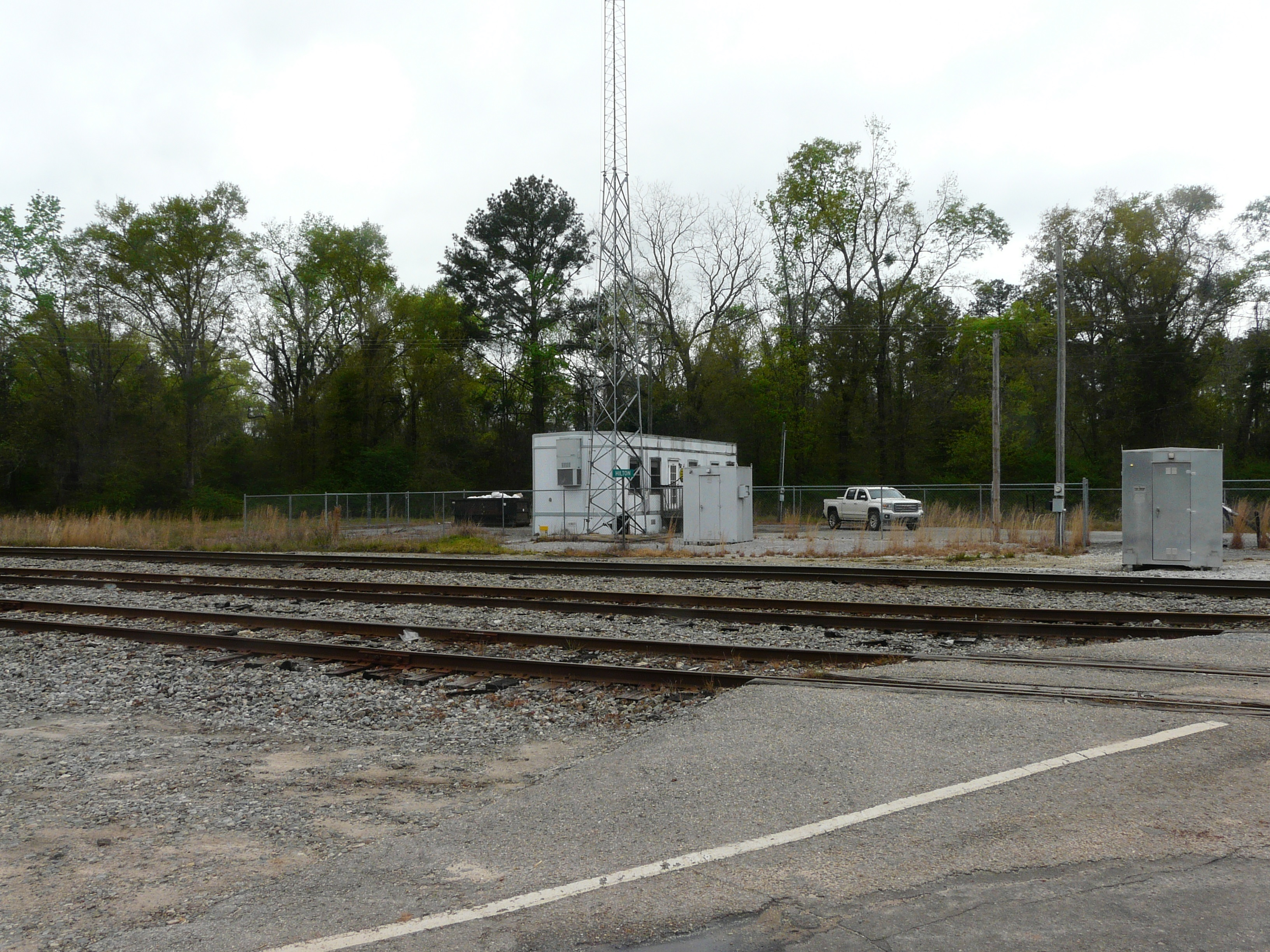
- A small office along the Hilton and Albany Railroad at Old River Road in Early County, Georgia.

Overview
- Parent company: Genesee and Wyoming Inc.
- Headquarters: Hilton, Georgia
- Reporting mark: HAL
- Dates of operation: 1999–
- Predecessor: Seaboard System Railroad

Technical
- Length: 56 mi (90 km)

Other
- Website: https://www.gwrr.com/hal/

The Hilton and Albany Railroad (reporting mark HAL) is a class III shortline railroad owned and operated by Genesee and Wyoming Inc.. The railroad runs from Hilton to Albany based in Georgia. The railroad's line interchanges with CSX Transportation (CSX) and the Bay Line Railroad (BAYL).

== Locomotive fleet ==
Number	Model	Builder	Build date	Former nos.	Disposition	Notes
2318	GP39-2	EMD	1966	Ex-VRE RP39-2C V01, CSX 6669, SBD 6669, ACL GP40 927	Operational	
3351	SD40-2	EMD	1979	Ex-HLCX 8036, BNSF 8036, BN 8036	Operational	
3352	SD40-2	EMD	1979	Ex-HLCX 8033, BNSF 8033, BN 8033	Operational	
