= AN Railway =

Class III railroad in Florida

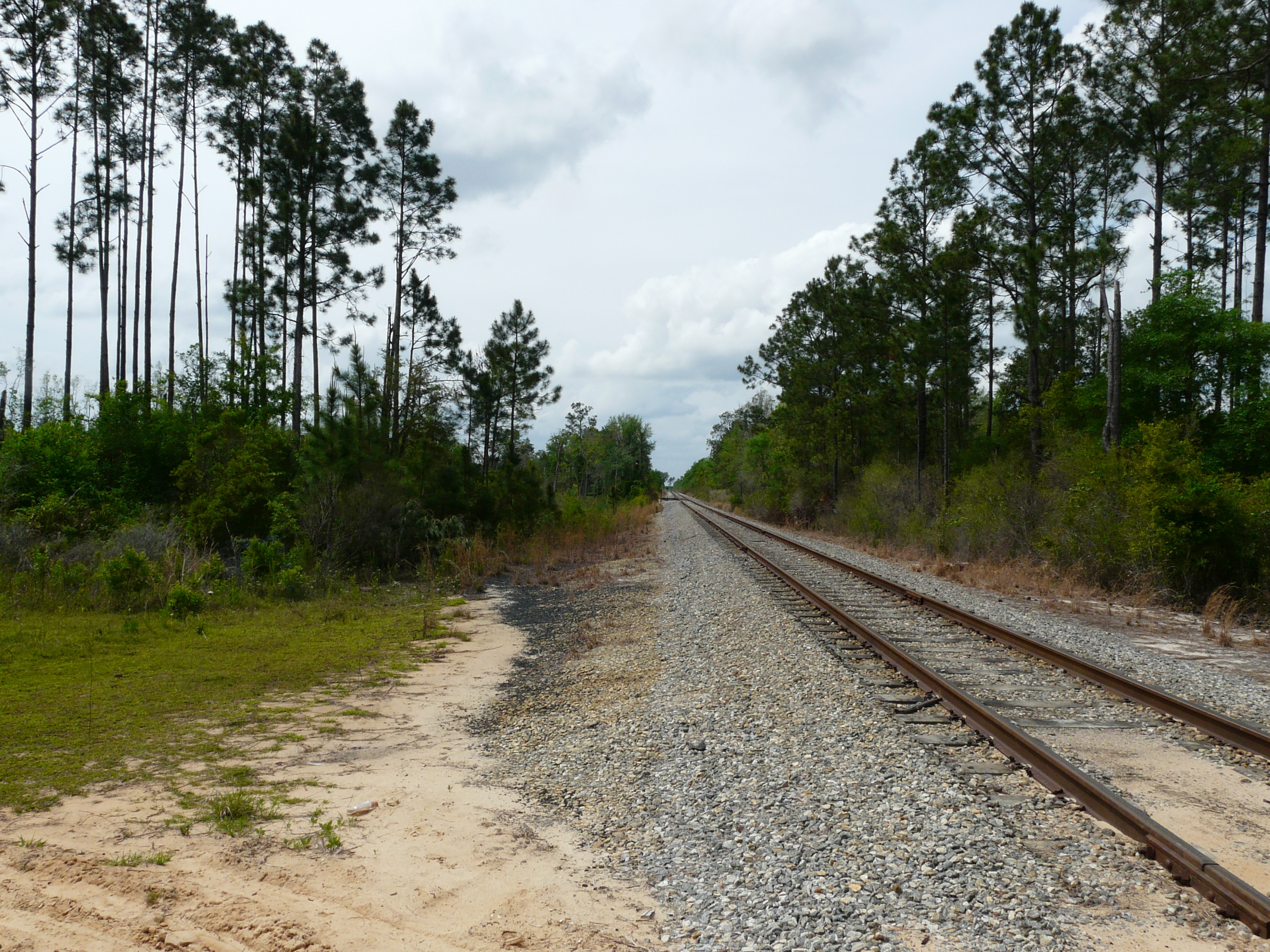
- The AN Railway in Liberty County, Florida

Overview
- Headquarters: Port Saint Joe, Florida
- Reporting mark: AN
- Locale: Florida Panhandle
- Dates of operation: 2002–present
- Predecessor: Apalachicola Northern Railroad

Technical
- Track gauge: 4 ft 8 1/2 in (1,435 mm)
- Length: 96 miles (154 km)

Other
- Website: Official website

The AN Railway (reporting mark AN) is one of several shortline railroad companies leased by the Genesee & Wyoming parent company. It operates between Port Saint Joe, Florida and a connection with the Florida Gulf & Atlantic Railroad at Chattahoochee, Florida. The railroad no longer reaches its namesake city of Apalachicola, Florida, as the rails have been removed between Franklin and Apalachicola. The railroad operates approximately 96 miles (154 km) of track.

== History ==
The original line was constructed by the Apalachicola Northern Railroad between 1905 and 1910. The Apalachicola Northern continued to operate it through various corporate reorganizations until 2002, when it leased the line to the Rail Management Corporation, which also acquired its locomotives, rolling stock, and railroad equipment. The new company began operating on September 1, 2002. Genesee & Wyoming acquired the Rail Management Corporation and its railroads in 2005.

== Equipment ==
Unlike most shortlines, the AN Railway's locomotive fleet consisted entirely of originally purchased units direct from the manufacturer, as opposed to the purchasing of second-hand engines. Its diesel roster is primarily EMD hood units, although many of these locomotives were sold off after business on the railroad dropped with the closure of some industrial areas.

=== Current roster ===
Model	Quantity	Built	Numbers
EMD GP15T	3	1983	720-722

=== Retired Roster ===
Model	Quantity	Built	Retired	Numbers
EMD NW2	3	1947	1970	701-704
EMD SW9	7	1952–1953	2005	705-711
EMD SW1500	8	1969–1970	2005	712-719

== See also ==
- List of United States railroads
- List of Florida railroads
- Genesee & Wyoming
- Bay Line Railroad
