= Georgia State Route 273 =

State highway in Georgia, United States

State Route 273
- SR 273 highlighted in red

Route information
- Maintained by GDOT
- Length: 17.2 mi (27.7 km)
- Existed: 1950–present

Major junctions
- West end: SR 273 Spur / SR 370 southwest of Cedar Springs
- SR 39 east of Cedar Springs
- East end: SR 91 southwest of Colquitt

Location
- Country: United States
- State: Georgia
- Counties: Early, Miller

Highway system
- Georgia State Highway System; Interstate; US; State; Special
← SR 272	→ SR 274

State Route 273 (SR 273) is a 17.2-mile-long (27.7 km) west-east state highway located in the southwestern part of the U.S. state of Georgia. It travels within Early and Miller counties.

== Route description ==
SR 273 begins at an intersection with SR 273 Spur and SR 370 southwest of Cedar Springs. The highway heads northeast to Cedar Springs and then heads east to an intersection with SR 39 just before entering Miller County. It then heads east-southeast to meet its eastern terminus, an intersection with SR 91 southwest of Colquitt. Here, the roadway continues as Cypress Creek Road.

There is no section of SR 273 that is included as a part of the National Highway System, a system of routes determined to be the most important for the nation's economy, mobility and defense.

== History ==
SR 273 was established in 1950 along an alignment from US 84/SR 38 in Jakin, Georgia northeast to SR 39 near the unincorporated community of Killarney. By 1969, SR 273 was moved to the same alignment as it travels today.

== Major intersections ==
County	Location	mi	km	Destinations	Notes
Early		0.0	0.0	SR 273 Spur west / SR 370 (Great Southern Highway)	Western terminus of SR 273; eastern terminus of SR 273 Spur
Early		8.1	13.0	SR 39 (Lucile Highway) – Donalsonville, Blakely	
Miller		17.2	27.7	SR 91 – Donalsonville, Colquitt	Eastern terminus; roadway continues as Cypress Creek Road.
1.000 mi = 1.609 km; 1.000 km = 0.621 mi

== Early County spur route ==
State Route 273 Spur
- Location: Rural Early County
- Length: 1.6 mi (2.6 km)
- Existed: 1985–present

State Route 273 Spur (SR 273 Spur) is a 1.6-mile-long (2.6 km) spur route that exists entirely within the west-central part of Early County.

The spur route begins just east of the Chattahoochee River, at an entrance to a Georgia-Pacific plant. The highway travels on a nearly due east routing until it meets its eastern terminus, an intersection with the SR 273 mainline and SR 370 southwest of Cedar Springs.

There is no section of SR 273 Spur that is included as a part of the National Highway System, a system of routes determined to be the most important for the nation's economy, mobility and defense.

The roadway that would eventually become SR 273 Spur was built between June 1963 and the end of 1966 as an unnumbered road west-southwest from Cedar Springs. In 1967, SR 363 Spur was designated on this road. In 1985, when SR 363 and SR 363 Spur were decommissioned, SR 273 was extended west-southwest of Cedar Springs. This replaced the eastern part of SR 363 Spur. What was the western part was redesignated as SR 273 Spur.

The entire route is in Early County.

Location	mi	km	Destinations	Notes
	0.0	0.0	Georgia-Pacific plant entrance	Western terminus
	1.6	2.6	SR 273 east / SR 370 (Great Southern Highway)	Eastern terminus of SR 273 Spur; western terminus of SR 273
1.000 mi = 1.609 km; 1.000 km = 0.621 mi
