= Apalachicola Northern Railroad =

American railroad service

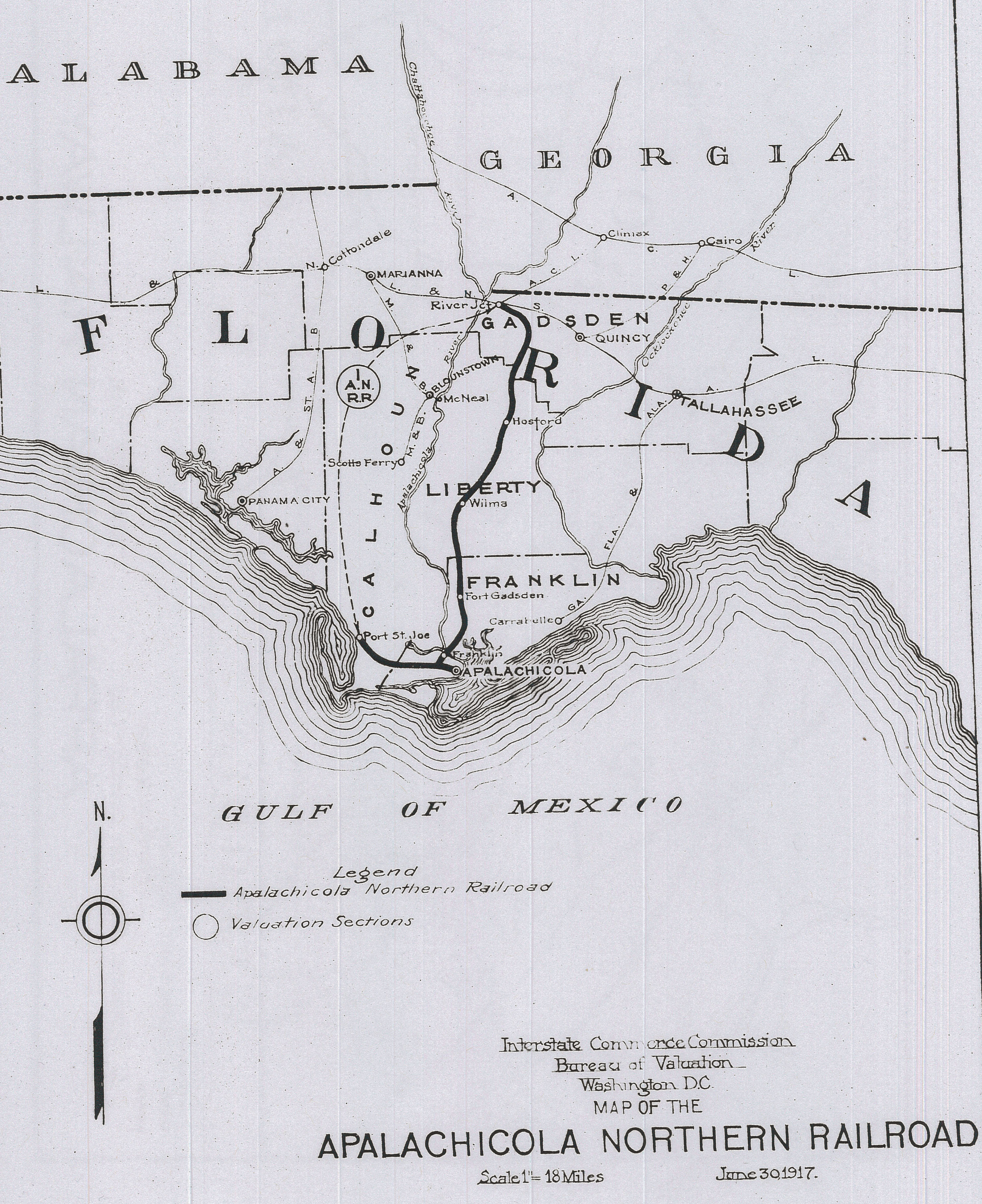
- 1917 map of the railroad

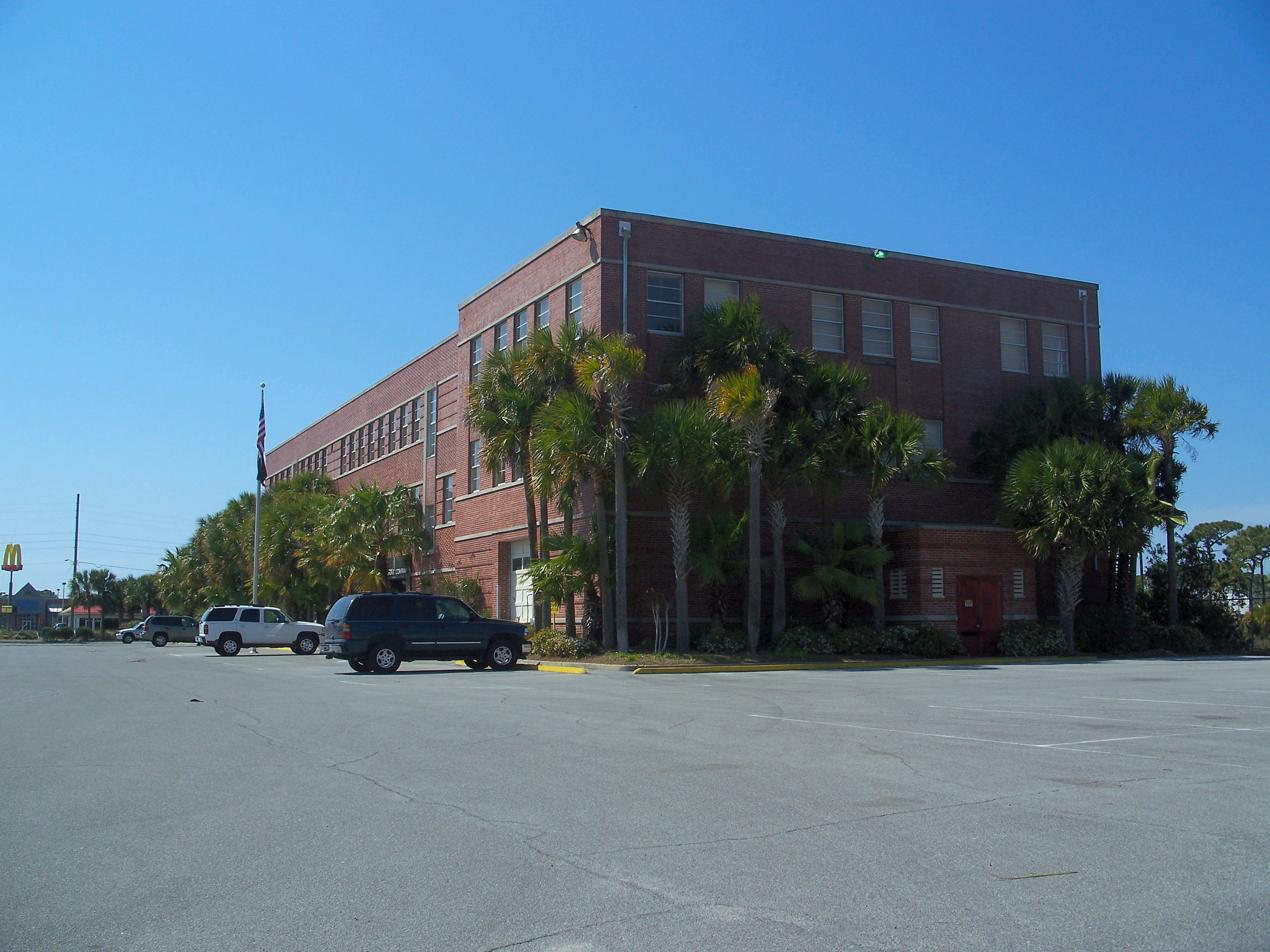
- The Apalachicola Northern's former headquarters in Port St. Joe, Florida.

Overview
- Headquarters: Port Saint Joe, Florida
- Reporting mark: AN
- Locale: Florida Panhandle
- Dates of operation: 1903–2002
- Successor: AN Railway

Technical
- Track gauge: 4 ft 8 1/2 in (1,435 mm)
- Length: 96 miles (154 km)

The Apalachicola Northern Railroad (reporting mark AN) was a short-line railroad which operated in the Florida Panhandle of the United States. It owned and operated a 96-mile (154 km) between Port Saint Joe, Florida, and Chattahoochee, Florida, with a short spur to Apalachicola, Florida. It was founded in 1903 and ceased operating in 2002 when the St. Joe Company, its corporate parent, leased its line to the AN Railway.

== History ==
The company was chartered on April 7, 1903. Construction began on March 21, 1905, and trains began running north from Apalachicola in 1907. The extension to Port St. Joe was completed on May 10, 1910.

The company operated in receivership on three occasions: July 1907 to October 1908, May 1914 to February 1916 and May 1932 to December 1936.

The company came under ownership of Alfred I. du Pont in 1933, along with the entire town of Port St. Joe. The railroad's largest customer, the St. Joe Paper Company mill in Port St. Joe, was owned by the Alfred I. duPont Testamentary Trust from 1936 to 1996. On September 30, 1940, Edward Ball, who managed the du Pont trust properties, transferred control of the railroad to the St. Joe Paper Company. When the paper company was sold in 1996, ownership of the railroad was returned to the St. Joe Company.

AN Railway, a subsidiary of the Rail Management Corporation, leased the line from the St. Joe Company on September 1, 2002 and acquired the railroad's locomotives, rolling stock, and railroad equipment. From that date the Apalachicola Northern ceased to operate as a railroad. The St. Joe Company continues to own the physical line.
