= Atlanta and St. Andrews Bay Railroad =

Railway in Alabama and Florida, US (1906–1994)

Atlanta and St. Andrews Bay Railway

Overview
- Reporting mark: ASAB
- Locale: Alabama and Florida
- Dates of operation: 1906–1994
- Successor: Bay Line Railroad

Technical
- Track gauge: 4 ft 8 1/2 in (1,435 mm)

The Atlanta and St. Andrews Bay Railway (reporting mark ASAB), also known as the Bay Line, was a Class I railroad which operated in Alabama and Florida. The company was founded in 1906 and opened its mainline between Dothan, Alabama, and Panama City, Florida, in 1908. Later reclassified as a short-line railroad, its assets were acquired by the Bay Line Railroad in 1994.

== History ==
As with many railroads in the region, the A&SAB began in the minds of timber investors and land developers seeking to access the agricultural resources of the Florida Panhandle and South Alabama. Chief among them was A. B. Steele, who created the railroad to build south out of Dothan towards the Gulf Coast. The company incorporated on February 14, 1906, and opened its 82-mile (132 km) line between Dothan and Panama City on July 15, 1908. Panama City was incorporated the following year at the terminus of the line. Plans were soon made to extend the railroad north to Atlanta, however financial difficulties and pressure from the Central of Georgia railroad put an end to any plans for extension.

Detail from a promotional matchbook

World War II brought about a considerable increase in traffic on the A&SAB. Several military bases in the vicinity of Panama City ensured the Bay Line would remain a hotbed of activity for the duration of the war. Shortly after the war in 1947, the A&SAB was granted Class I status. The company offered sleeper and coach passenger train service nightly between Panama City and Atlanta Union Station via Albany and Macon. The trains went over Central of Georgia Railway tracks from Dothan, Alabama, to Atlanta. At some point between 1955 and 1956 A&StA terminated all passenger service --coach and sleeping car service.

TOFC service began in 1962 with the construction of ramps at Panama City and Cottondale. Additional expansion came with the construction of a branch line to Graceville in 1971. In 1979 International Paper sold the railroad to Southwest Forest Industries, and the railroad changed hands again with the sale of Southwest Forest Industries to the Stone Container Corporation in 1987.

In 1989, Stone Container Corporation purchased from CSX Transportation a branch line from Grimes to Abbeville, Alabama. The new railroad, the Abbeville-Grimes Railway Company, was operated by the A&SAB. On January 1, 1994, the Rail Management Corporation acquired the assets of the railroad and created a new company, the Bay Line Railroad, to operate it.

=== Graceville branch ===
Construction of the branch spanning 7 miles (11 km) from Campbellton, Florida, to Graceville was completed on July 14, 1971. Graceville was located at the terminus of the Georgiana branch of the Louisville and Nashville Railroad. This allowed for interchange between the two railroads and access to a Southwest Forest Industries woodchip mill located in Graceville that supplied the Panama City paper mill. In addition to the woodchip mill, Gold Kist operated a peanut mill in Graceville.

The Seaboard System Railroad, successor to the Louisville and Nashville, abandoned the line into Graceville on January 16, 1984. The A&SAB purchased the small yard and wye track in Graceville from the vacating Seaboard and continued serving the city. Declining traffic prompted the abandonment of the branch by the mid 1990s.

=== Abbeville branch ===
Stone Container Corporation purchased the line between Grimes and Abbeville on March 1, 1989. The primary source of traffic is a woodchip mill near Abbeville, which provides woodchips for the Panama City paper mill. The Bay Line accessed the Abbeville & Grimes branch via trackage rights with CSX between Grimes and Dothan. The Abbeville branch was included in the sale to the Bay Line Railroad. The A&G was formally merged into the Bay Line on June 26, 1996.
