= Jane Donalson Harrell House =

- U.S. National Register of Historic Places
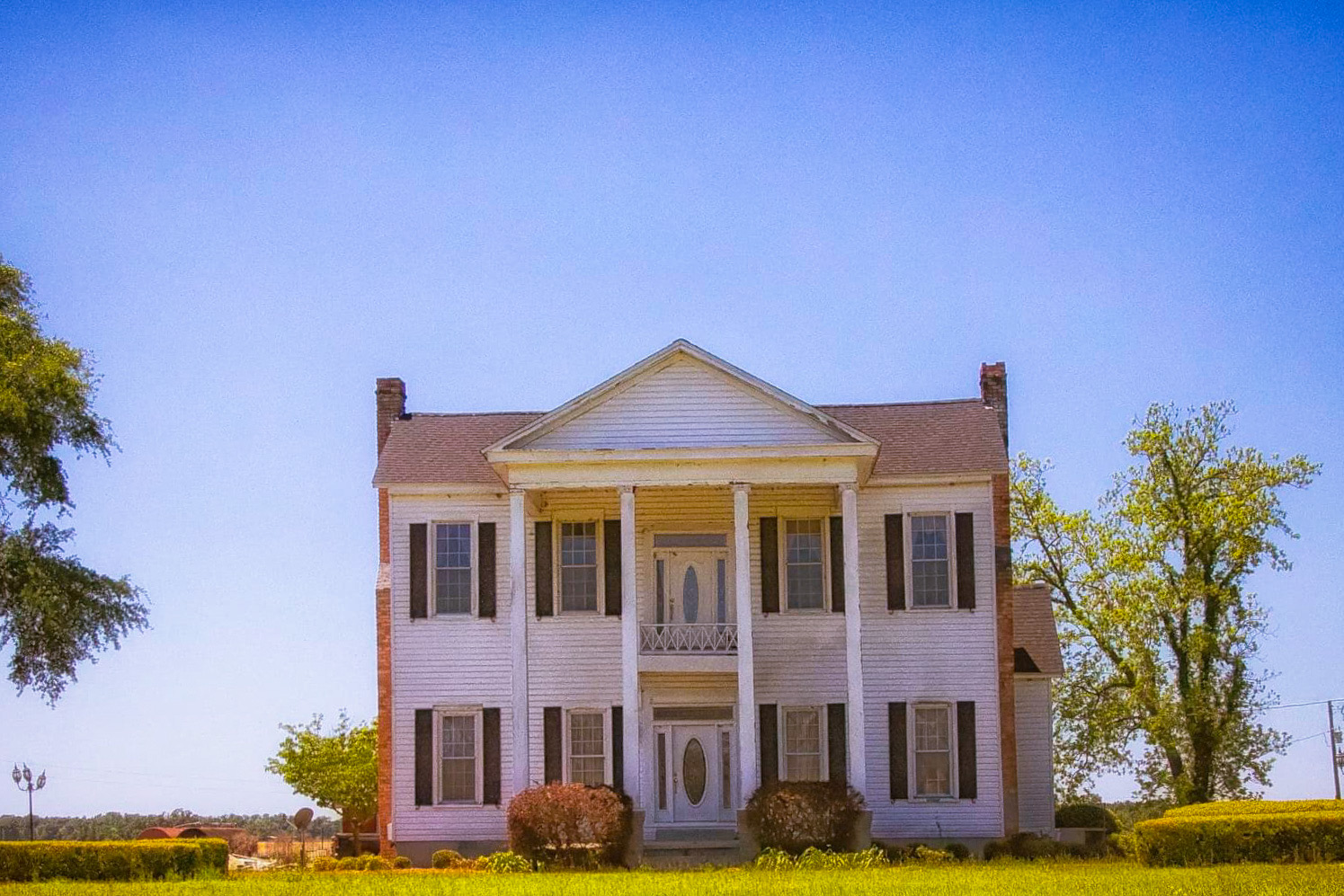

- Location within Georgia
- Location: SR 1975 off U.S. 84; Jakin, Georgia
- Coordinates: 31°05′02″N 84°59′46″W
- Area: 4 acres (1.6 ha)
- Built: c.1855
- Architectural style: Plantation Plain
- NRHP reference No.: 82002407
- Added to NRHP: June 17, 1982

The Jane Donalson Harrell House, located near the Chattahoochee River on County Route 1975 about .6 miles (0.97 km) south of U.S. 84 in Jakin, Georgia, was built around 1855. It was listed on the National Register of Historic Places in 1982.

It is a two-story Plantation Plain-style house with Greek Revival features.
