= Saffold, Georgia =

Unincorporated community in Georgia, U.S.

Coordinates: 31°07′13″N 85°02′00″W

Saffold is an unincorporated community in Early County, Georgia, United States. Its western boundary is the Chattahoochee River also bordering Gordon, Alabama. U.S. Route 84 and SR 370 pass through the community. It is located twenty miles (32 km) south of Blakely, 21 miles (34 km) southeast of Dothan, Alabama and two miles (3.2 km) northwest of Jakin.

== History ==
The community has the name of a local family of early settlers.
