= Rowena, Georgia =

Unincorporated community in Georgia, U.S.

Coordinates: 31°22′52″N 84°42′47″W

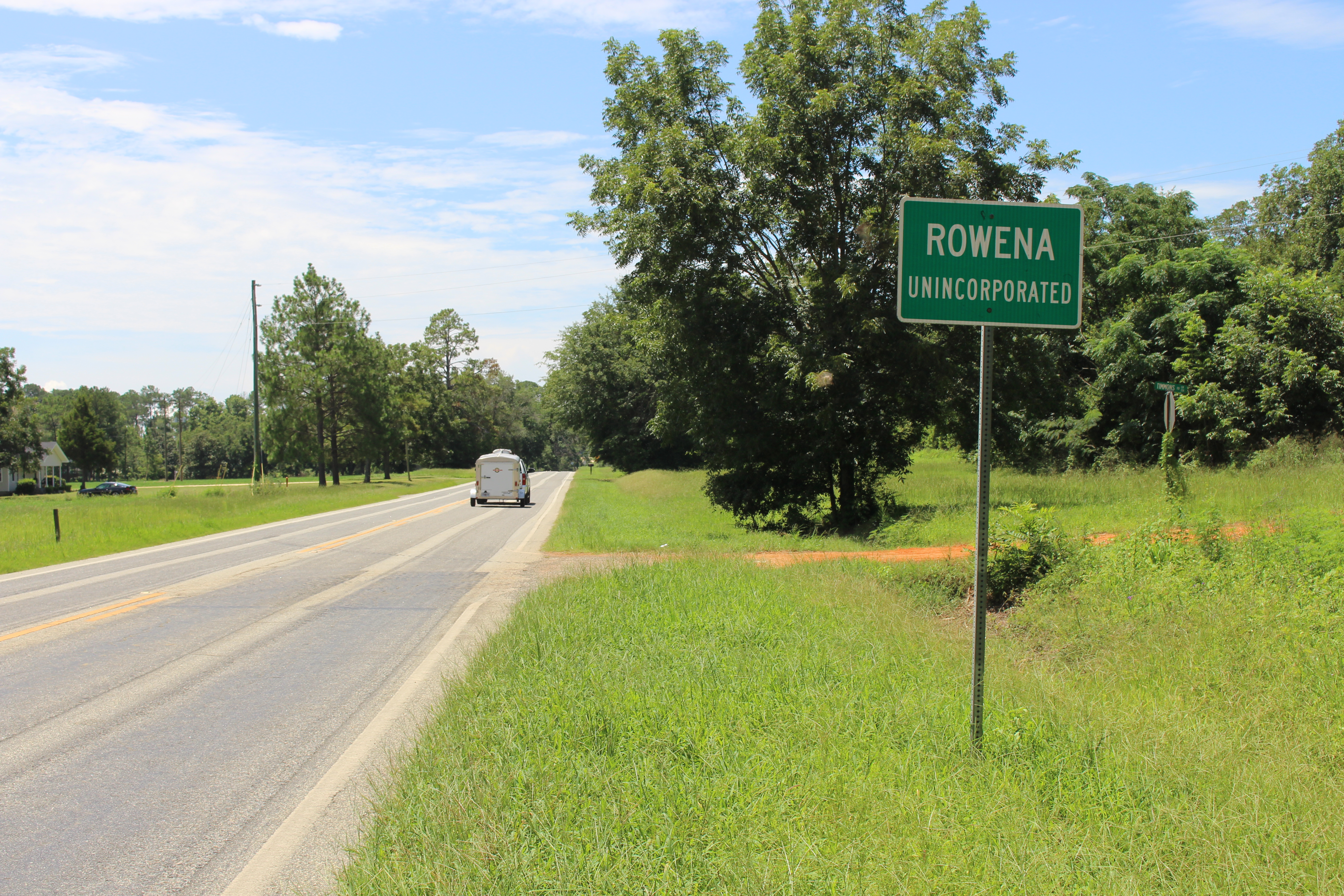
Road sign for Rowena

Rowena is an unincorporated community in Early County, in the U.S. state of Georgia. Rowena is named after the character from the Walter Scott novel Ivanhoe.

== History ==
The community was named after one Rowena Collins.
