= Early County Courthouse =

- U.S. National Register of Historic Places
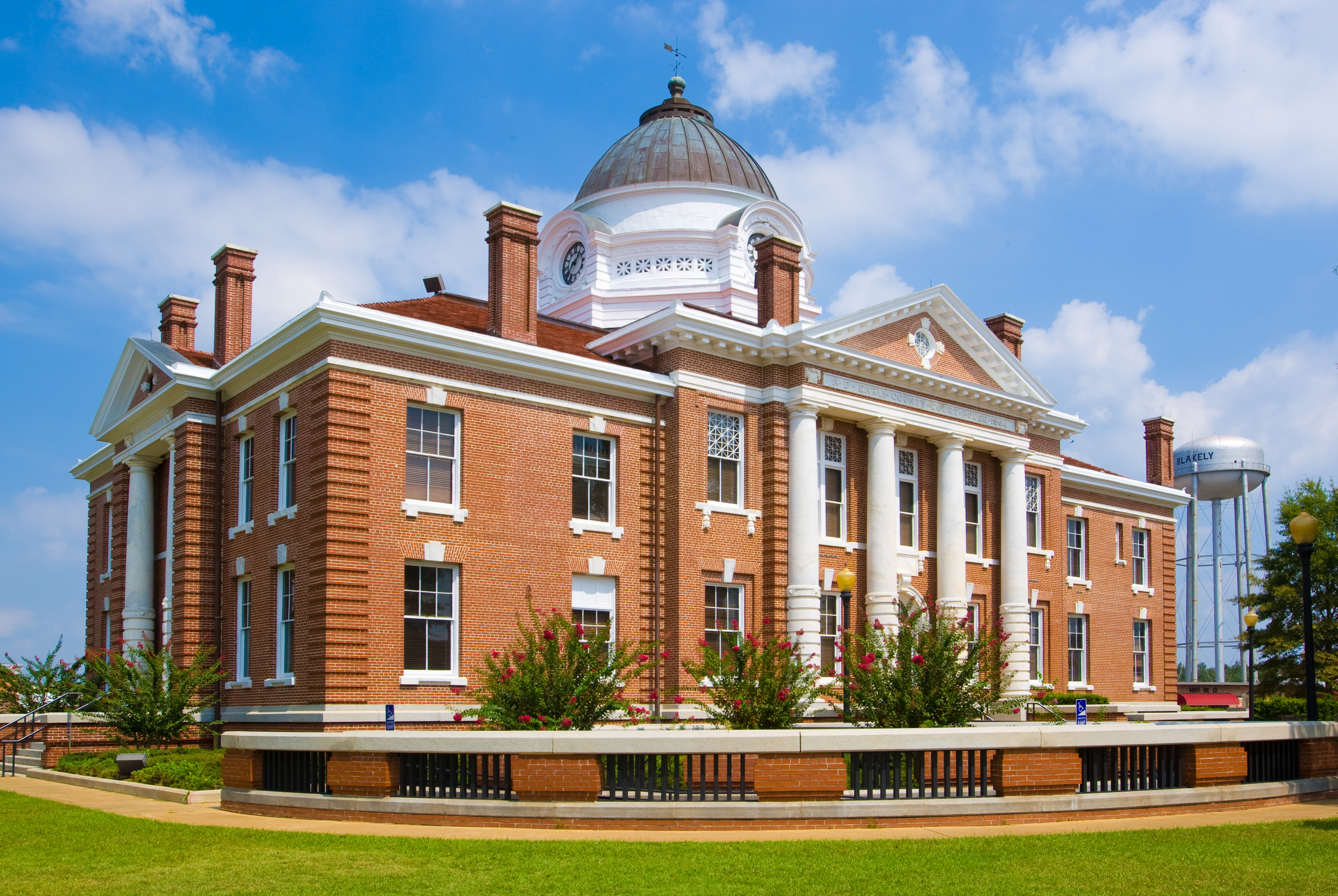

- Location within Georgia Location within the United States
- Location: Courthouse Sq., Blakely, Georgia
- Coordinates: 31°22′39″N 84°56′3″W
- Area: 1.5 acres (0.61 ha)
- Architectural style: Classical Revival
- MPS: Georgia County Courthouses TR
- NRHP reference No.: 80001015
- Added to NRHP: September 18, 1980

The Early County Courthouse (also known as the Grand Ole Lady) is the historic county courthouse of Early County, Georgia, located on Courthouse Square in Blakely, Georgia, the county seat. It was built in 1904 and added to the National Register of Historic Places on September 18, 1980. It is also a contributing building in the Blakely Court Square Historic District, NRHP-listed in 2002.

== History ==
Early County was chartered in 1818 and Blakely was established as the county seat in 1825. Early County's first courthouse was a log building, first used in 1827. That building was sold for $13 and moved, making way for the second courthouse. That two-story wooden structure was built in 1834.

The county's third courthouse, a western-facing building, was built in 1857-58 by Thomas Williams for $4,650; it was sold for $155 to make way for the fourth and present courthouse, built in 1904-1905. The third courthouse was described by the Early County News as dangerously unsafe and dilapidated. The proposal to build a new court building "was tinted with a light wash of New South fervor and an outpouring of self-promotion." The grand jury recommended a new courthouse, and a January 1905 piece by the Early County News praised an architectural rendering of the proposed design by the architects Thomas Henry Morgan and John Robert Dillon, as "the handsomest structure of its kind in Southern Georgia", which would "be in keeping with the wealth and prosperity of Early County--the Garden spot of Georgia."

== Design ==
The courthouse is two and half stories and is made of brick on the exterior, with marble floors in the main public spaces. It is in the Neoclassical (Classical Revival) style and is surrounded by smaller buildings, grass, and trees, providing a recreational space and a center for community activities. The courthouse in designed a cross plan; each of the building's four facades is fronted with four rusticated Georgia columns of solid granite, which support the porticoes facing Courthouse Square. The courthouse has a low dome, of the Beaux-Arts style.

On the courthouse square stands an original wooden Confederate flagpole, erected in 1861, which flies the Stars and Stripes; it was hewn from a long leaf pine harvested about a mile from the county seat. The flagpole is 100 feet tall and is believed to be the only original Confederate flagpole still standing. The courthouse square also contains a monument to the peanut, carved in stone atop a pedestal, commemorating the enduring importance of this cash crop to the region.

== See also ==
- National Register of Historic Places listings in Early County, Georgia
