= Blakely Court Square Historic District =

Historic district in Georgia, United States

- U.S. National Register of Historic Places
- U.S. Historic district
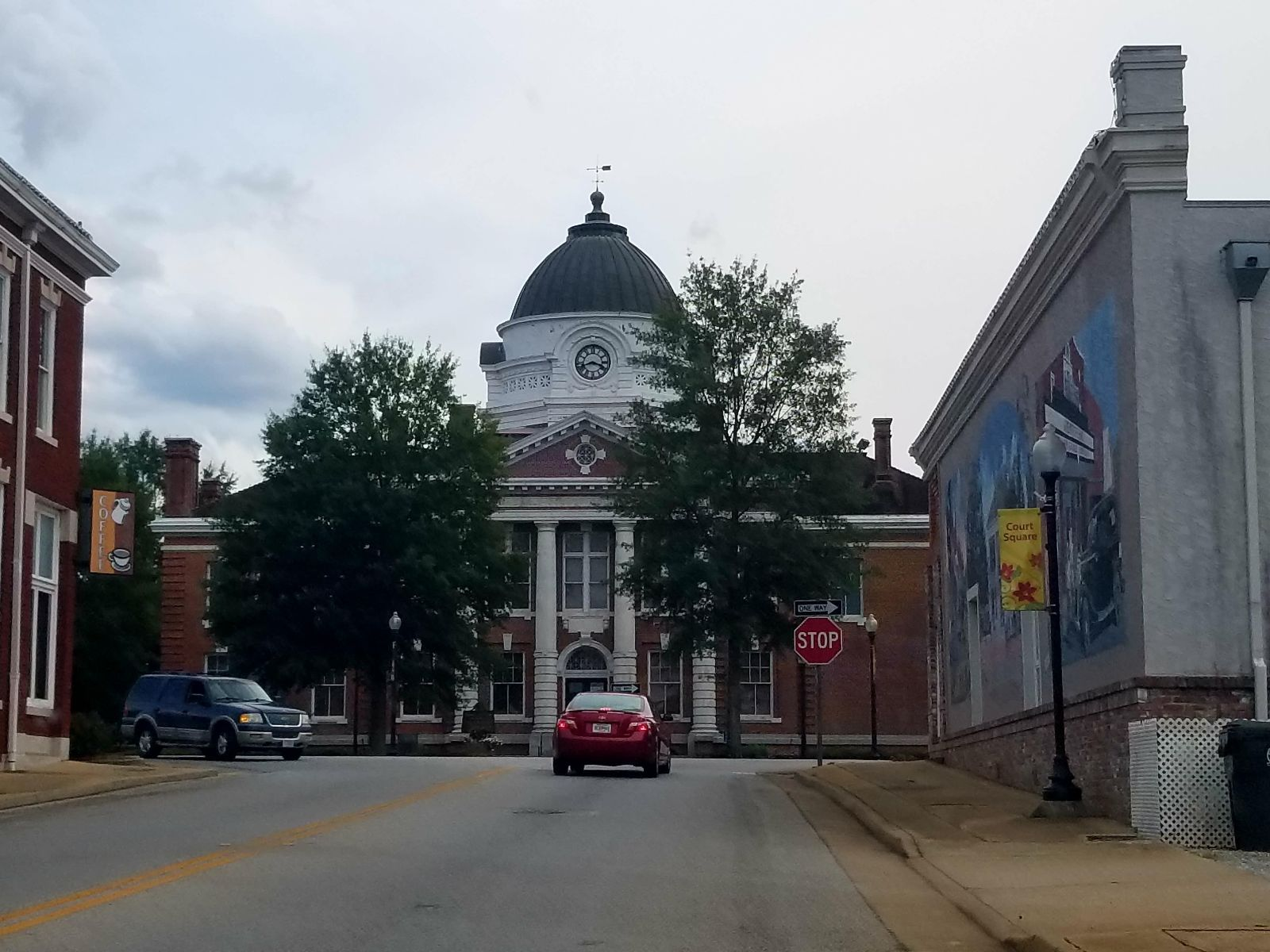

- Location within Georgia
- Location: Bounded by Powell St., Smith Ave., and Church and Bay Sts., Blakely, Georgia
- Coordinates: 31.377222°N 84.933889°W
- Area: 30 acres (12 ha)
- Architect: Holman, H.L.; others
- Architectural style: Late Victorian, Late 19th And 20th Century Revivals
- NRHP reference No.: 02000452
- Added to NRHP: May 9, 2002

The Blakely Court Square Historic District is a 30 acres (12 ha) historic district in Blakely in Early County, Georgia which was listed on the National Register of Historic Places in 2002.

The district is centered around the Early County Courthouse and is bounded by Powell St., Smith Ave., and Church and Bay Sts. It included 72 contributing buildings, two contributing structures, and two contributing objects. Additionally, it also included 21 non-contributing buildings and one non-contributing object.

It was deemed significant in the areas of architecture, community planning and development, politics/government and commerce. Its architectural landmarks include:

- Early County Courthouse (1905), neo-Classical
- United States Post Office (1937), Stripped Classical
- Blakely City Hall and Fire Department (1939), the Colonial Revival-style
- Early County Jail (1940), Art Deco
- two churches in Gothic Revival-style.
