= Damascus, Georgia =

- City
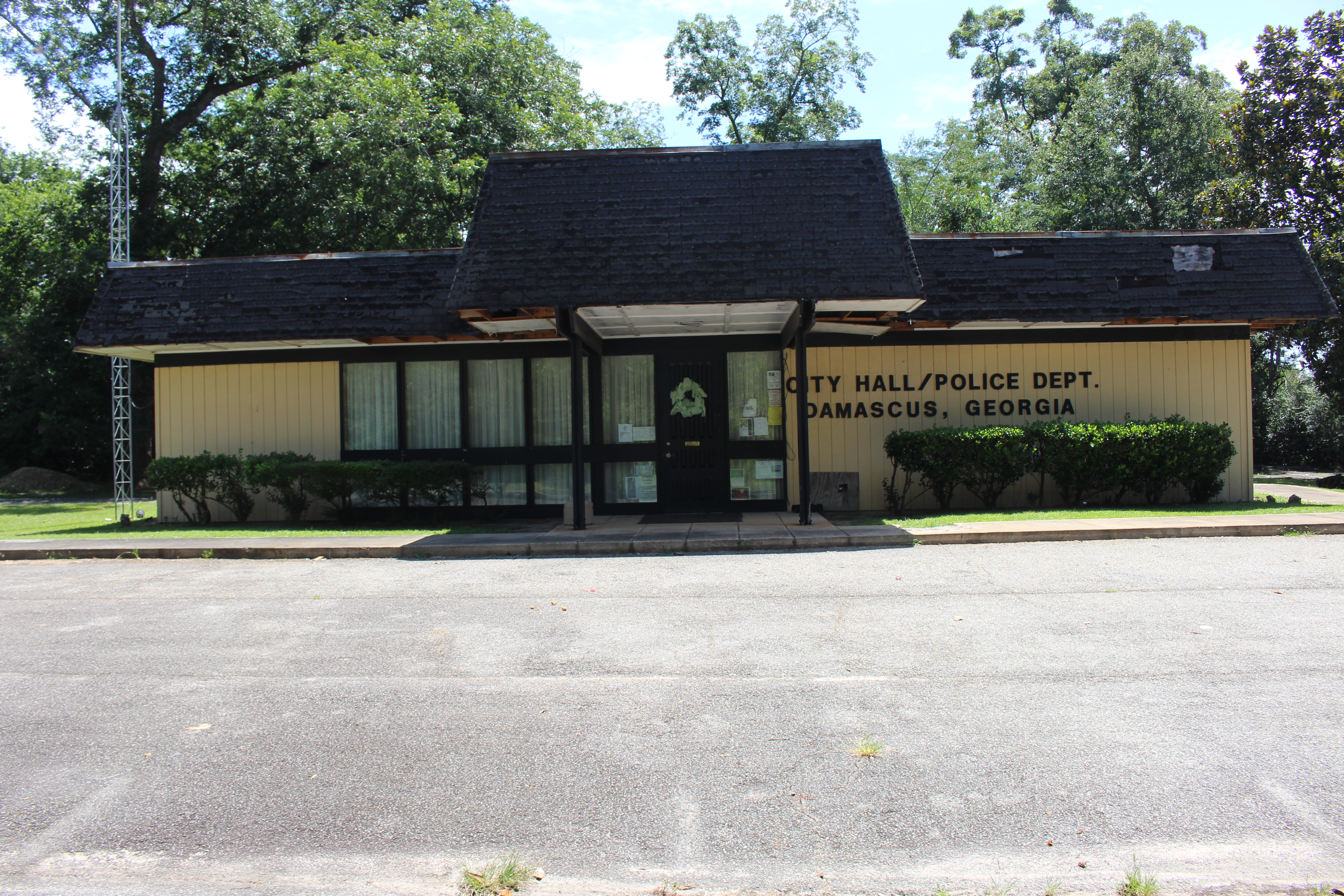
- Damascus City Hall and Police Department

- Location in Early County and the state of Georgia
- Coordinates: 31°17′55″N 84°43′3″W
- Country: United States
- State: Georgia
- County: Early

Area
  - Total: 1.77 sq mi (4.58 km^{2})
  - Land: 1.76 sq mi (4.56 km^{2})
  - Water: 0.0077 sq mi (0.02 km^{2})
- Elevation: 220 ft (67 m)

Population (2020)
  - Total: 212
  - Density: 120.4/sq mi (46.48/km^{2})
- Time zone: UTC-5 (Eastern (EST))
  - Summer (DST): UTC-4 (EDT)
- ZIP codes: 31741, 39841
- Area code: 229
- FIPS code: 13-21436
- GNIS feature ID: 0355426

Damascus is a city in Early County, Georgia, United States. The population was 212 in the 2020 census, down from 254 in the 2010 census.

== History ==
An early variant name was Kestler. An act of Georgia General Assembly officially changed the name to Damascus in 1914. The present name is a transfer from nearby Old Damascus, which it was named for Damascus, Syria. Old Damascus would be bypassed when a new railroad line was being built through the area.

In 2021, an EF2 tornado struck the area south of town, causing major damage and injuring five people.

On June 14, 2023, a tornado struck the town destroying a home and slightly injuring three people.

=== Flag ===
On May 19, 2026, Damascus adopted a new flag.

== Geography ==
Damascus is located in eastern Early County at 31°17′55″N 84°43′3″W (31.298580, -84.717429). Georgia State Route 45 passes through the community, leading north 10 miles (16 km) to Arlington and south 9 miles (14 km) to Colquitt. Georgia State Route 200 also passes through the center of town, leading east 24 miles (39 km) to Newton and northwest 15 miles (24 km) to Blakely, the Early County seat.

According to the United States Census Bureau, Damascus has a total area of 1.8 square miles (4.6 km^{2}), of which 0.01 square miles (0.02 km^{2}), or 0.48%, is water.

== Demographics ==
Historical population
| Census | Pop. | Note | %± |
|---|---|---|---|
| 1910 | 413 | | — |
| 1920 | 373 | | −9.7% |
| 1930 | 436 | | 16.9% |
| 1940 | 477 | | 9.4% |
| 1950 | 402 | | −15.7% |
| 1960 | 297 | | −26.1% |
| 1970 | 272 | | −8.4% |
| 1980 | 403 | | 48.2% |
| 1990 | 290 | | −28.0% |
| 2000 | 277 | | −4.5% |
| 2010 | 254 | | −8.3% |
| 2020 | 212 | | −16.5% |
U.S. Decennial Census; 1850-1870 1870-1880; 1890-1910 1920-1930; 1940 1950 1960; 1970 1980 1990; 2000 2010

=== Racial and ethnic composition ===
Damascus city, Georgia – Racial and ethnic composition Note: the US Census treats Hispanic/Latino as an ethnic category. This table excludes Latinos from the racial categories and assigns them to a separate category. Hispanics/Latinos may be of any race.
| Race / Ethnicity (NH = Non-Hispanic) | Pop 2000 | Pop 2010 | Pop 2020 | % 2000 | % 2010 | % 2020 |
|---|---|---|---|---|---|---|
| White alone (NH) | 100 | 82 | 65 | 36.10% | 32.28% | 30.66% |
| Black or African American alone (NH) | 176 | 162 | 137 | 63.54% | 63.78% | 64.62% |
| Native American or Alaska Native alone (NH) | 0 | 0 | 3 | 0.00% | 0.00% | 1.42% |
| Asian alone (NH) | 0 | 6 | 0 | 0.00% | 2.36% | 0.00% |
| Native Hawaiian or Pacific Islander alone (NH) | 0 | 0 | 0 | 0.00% | 0.00% | 0.00% |
| Other race alone (NH) | 0 | 0 | 0 | 0.00% | 0.00% | 0.00% |
| Mixed race or Multiracial (NH) | 1 | 3 | 1 | 0.36% | 1.18% | 0.47% |
| Hispanic or Latino (any race) | 0 | 1 | 6 | 0.00% | 0.39% | 2.83% |
| Total | 277 | 254 | 212 | 100.00% | 100.00% | 100.00% |

=== 2020 census ===
In 2020, the city had a population of 212, down from 254 in 2010 and 277 in 2000.

== Education ==
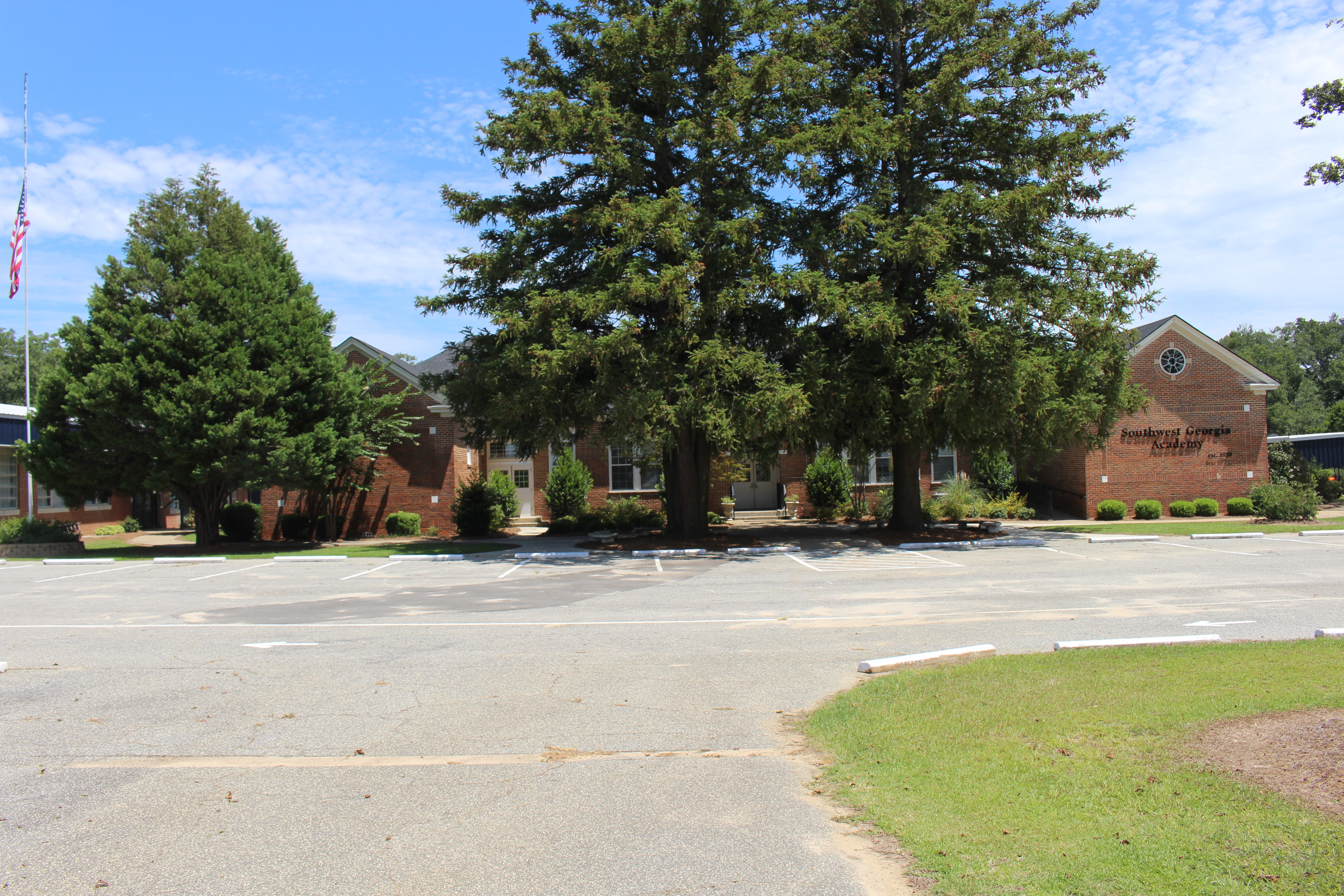
Southwest Georgia Academy, located on the grounds of the former Damascus High School

Public school students are zoned to the Early County School District which operates three schools in Blakely: Early County Elementary School, Early County Middle School, and Early County High School.

Damascus is home to Southwest Georgia Academy, which was founded in 1970 as a segregation academy and participates in the Georgia Independent School Association. Its property formerly housed Damascus High School.

== Gallery ==
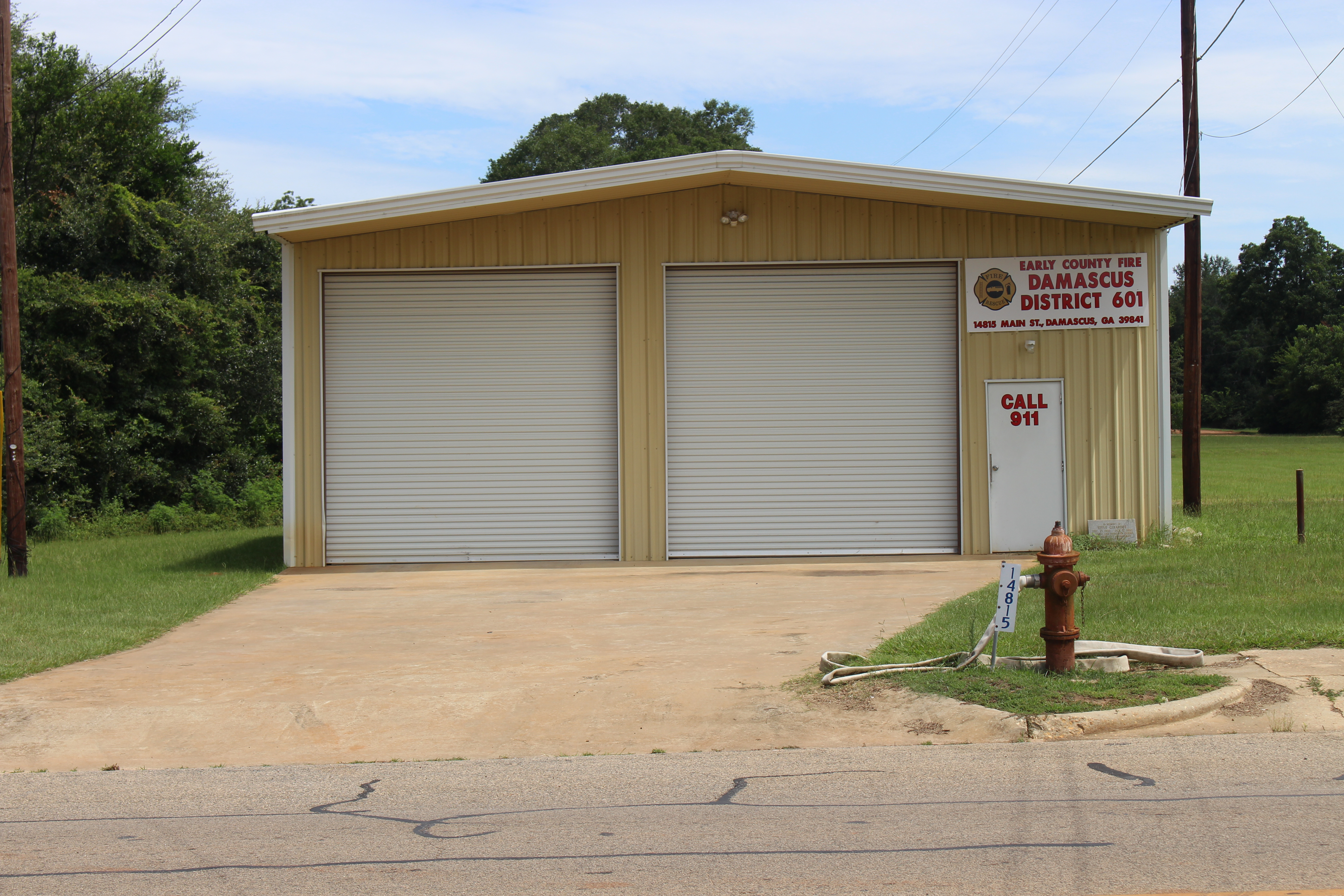
Early County Fire Damascus District fire station

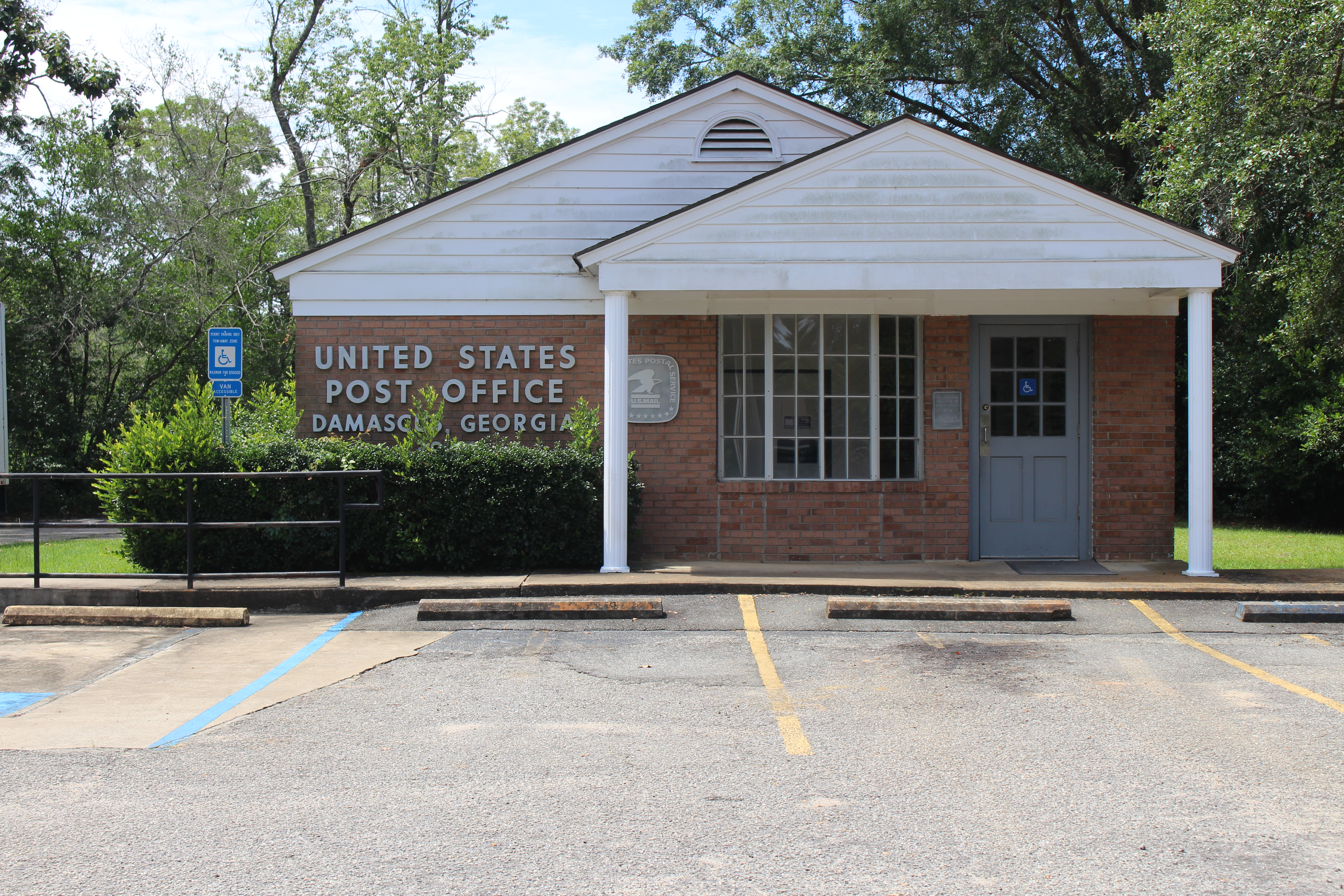
Damascus Post Office

== Notable people ==
- Robbie Robinson, bodybuilder, actor, three-time Mr. Universe overall winner
- Shawn Williams (American football), football player, Atlanta Falcons
