= Urquhart, Georgia =

Unincorporated community in Georgia, U.S.

Coordinates: 31°28′26″N 85°00′34″W

Urquhart is an unincorporated community in Early County, in the U.S. state of Georgia.

== History ==
The community was named after Dr. J. Q. Urquhart, a country physician.
