= Lucile, Georgia =

Unincorporated community in Georgia, U.S.

Coordinates: 31°14′37″N 84°55′02″W

Lucile is an unincorporated community in Early and Miller counties, in the U.S. state of Georgia.

== History ==
A post office called Lucile was established in 1899, and remained in operation until 1903. An early variant name was "Racketville". The present name is after Lucille Middleton, the daughter of the local postmaster.
