= Hentown, Georgia =

Unincorporated community in Georgia, U.S.

Coordinates: 31°16′49″N 84°50′12″W

Hentown is an unincorporated community in Early County, in the U.S. state of Georgia.

== History ==
The community was named for the fact a local resident kept a large flock of chickens.
