= Southwest Georgia Academy =

School in Damascus, Georgia, United States

Coordinates: 31.3052°N 84.7252°W

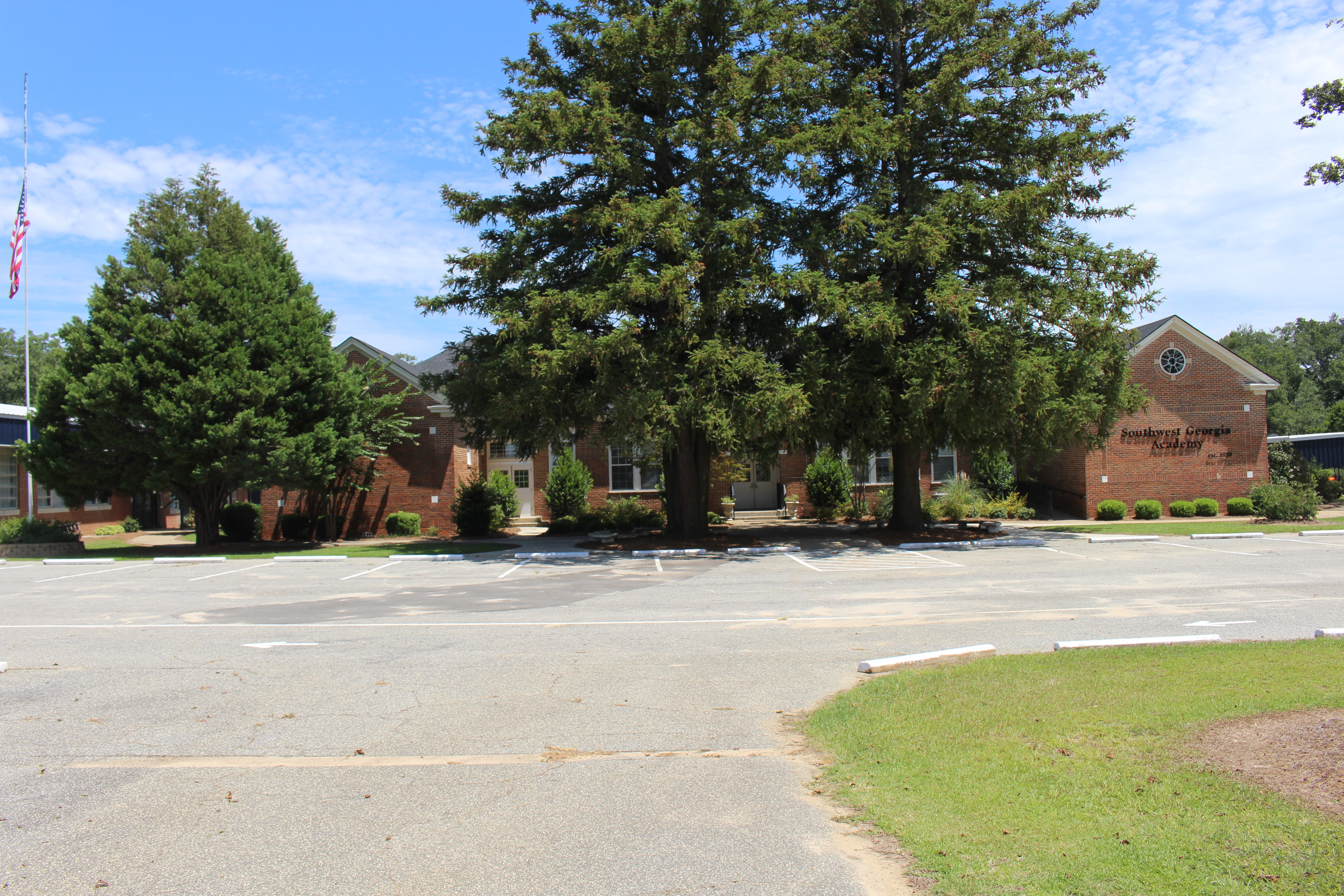
Southwest Georgia Academy

Southwest Georgia Academy is a K–12 private school in Damascus, Georgia. It was established in January 1970 as a segregation academy; the property formerly housed Damascus High School. The founding headmaster was W.T. Henry. According to the National Center for Education Statistics, 266 of 272 students, or 97.8% of the student body were white as of 2018, while 49% of the population of the county was white.

== Alumni ==
- Lea Henry Basketball player and coach.
