= Bay Line Railroad =

Class III railroad in Southeastern United States

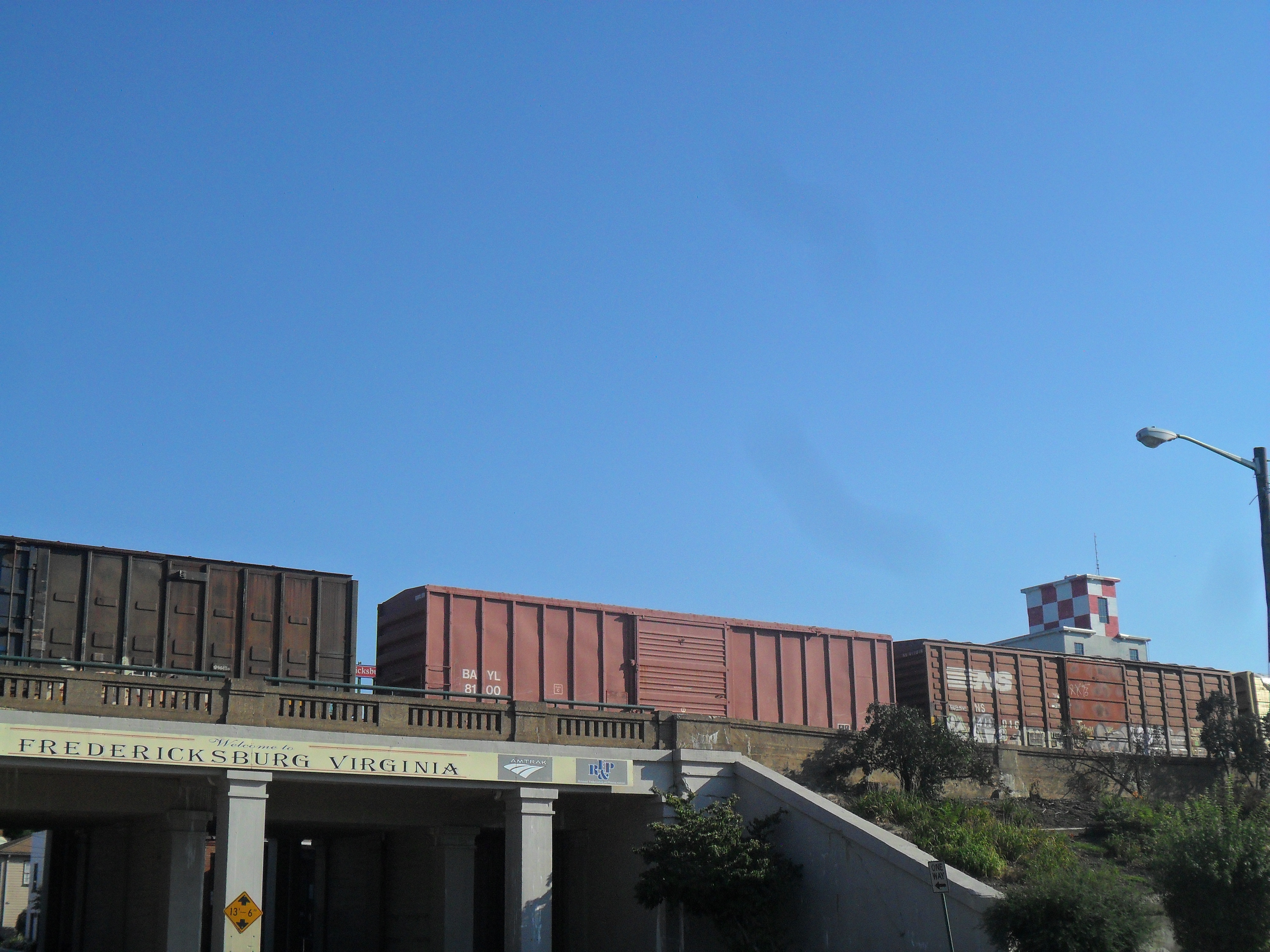
- A Bay Line Railroad box car rolls through Fredericksburg, Virginia, on a CSX freight.

Overview
- Headquarters: Panama City, Florida
- Reporting mark: BAYL
- Locale: Florida Panhandle and southeastern Alabama
- Dates of operation: 1994–present
- Predecessor: Atlanta and St. Andrews Bay Railroad

Technical
- Track gauge: 4 ft 8 1/2 in (1,435 mm)
- Length: 182 miles (293 km)

Other
- Website: Official website

The Bay Line Railroad (reporting mark BAYL) is one of several short line railroad companies owned by Genesee & Wyoming Inc. It operates between Panama City, Florida, and Dothan, Alabama, including a branch from Grimes to Abbeville, Alabama, reached via trackage rights on CSX's Dothan Subdivision between Dothan and Grimes. The line interchanges with the Florida Gulf and Atlantic Railroad (ex-CSX, exx-Louisville & Nashville Railroad) at Cottondale, Florida and Dothan, Alabama, and with the Hilton & Albany Railroad at Hilton, Georgia.

A wide variety of commodities is carried, including aggregates, brick, cement, chemicals, coal, food and feed products, forest products, metallic ores and minerals, steel, and scrap.

== History ==
The company's main line between Panama City and Dothan was constructed in 1906–1908 by the Atlanta and St. Andrews Bay Railroad (ASAB). The Abbeville branch was constructed in 1887–1893 by the Alabama Midland Railway and came under the control of the Atlantic Coast Line Railroad in 1902. CSX Transportation, eventual successor to the ACL, sold the line to the Abbeville–Grimes Railway Company (AG) in 1989. This company was merged with the Bay Line Railroad on June 26, 1996.

The Stone Container Corporation had owned the ASAB since 1987. Effective January 1, 1994, it sold the assets of the railroad to Rail Management Corporation, which created the new Bay Line Railroad company to operate it. Genesee & Wyoming acquired all the assets of Rail Management on June 1, 2005, including the Bay Line Railroad.

In 2016, the Bay Line Railroad entered into an agreement with the Panama City Port Authority to operate a transload facility at the port’s Intermodal Distribution Center approximately 15 miles from Port Panama City. Choice Terminals provide customers with delivery, storage, inventory management and transloading of bulk products. The Bay Line Choice Terminal features a 20-car rail yard and owns equipment to support bulk transfers.

In 2017, the Bay Line Railroad was featured in the Panama City Living Magazine.

As of 2023, Genesee & Wyoming’s Bay Line Railroad has a total of 182 miles (44 in Alabama, and 138 in Florida (includes Chattahoochee Bay Railroad)), and has a maximum capacity of 286,000 lbs.
