= Freeman, Georgia =

Unincorporated community in Georgia, U.S.

Coordinates: 31°21′39″N 85°03′46″W

Freeman is an unincorporated community in Early County, in the U.S. state of Georgia.

== History ==
The first permanent settlement at Freeman was made in the 1840s. A post office called Freeman was in operation from 1900 until 1902.
