= New Hope, Early County, Georgia =

Unincorporated community in Georgia, U.S.

Coordinates: 31°16′16″N 84°49′35″W

New Hope is an unincorporated community in Early County, in the U.S. state of Georgia.

== History ==
The first permanent settlement at New Hope was made c. 1860. The post office at New Hope was called "Fitzhugh". This post office was in operation from 1898 until 1902.
