= Old Damascus, Georgia =

Unincorporated community in the United States

Coordinates: 31°18′27″N 84°44′14″W

Old Damascus is an unincorporated community in Early County, in the U.S. state of Georgia.

== History ==
Variant names are "Damascus" and "Old Town". The community was named after Damascus, in Syria. This was originally the only Damascus in the area. When construction of the railroad bypassed Old Damascus, most of the town moved to nearby "new" Damascus, and the original community's name was prefixed with "old".
