= Wilmington Terminal Railroad =

Overview
- Headquarters: Wilmington, North Carolina
- Reporting mark: WTRY
- Locale: Wilmington, North Carolina
- Dates of operation: 1986–

Technical
- Track gauge: 4 ft 8 1/2 in (1,435 mm) standard gauge

Other

The Wilmington Terminal Railroad (reporting mark WTRY) is a shortline railroad serving the Port of Wilmington (North Carolina). It began operations in 1986 over trackage owned by the North Carolina Ports Railway Commission, whose other lines (at Morehead City) were simultaneously leased to the Carolina Rail Services Company. The company is owned by Rail Link, Inc., a subsidiary of Genesee & Wyoming Inc., which acquired it from the Rail Management Corporation in 2005.

The Ports Railway Commission acquired the lines in 1980, and expanded its property, leased to WTRY, through a purchase of spurs from CSX Transportation in 1993. In 2002, the lines were transferred to the North Carolina State Ports Authority, in accordance with a recently passed state law.

== See also ==
- Genesee & Wyoming Inc.
