= Kolomoki Mounds =

Archaeological site in Georgia, US

- U.S. National Register of Historic Places
- U.S. National Historic Landmark
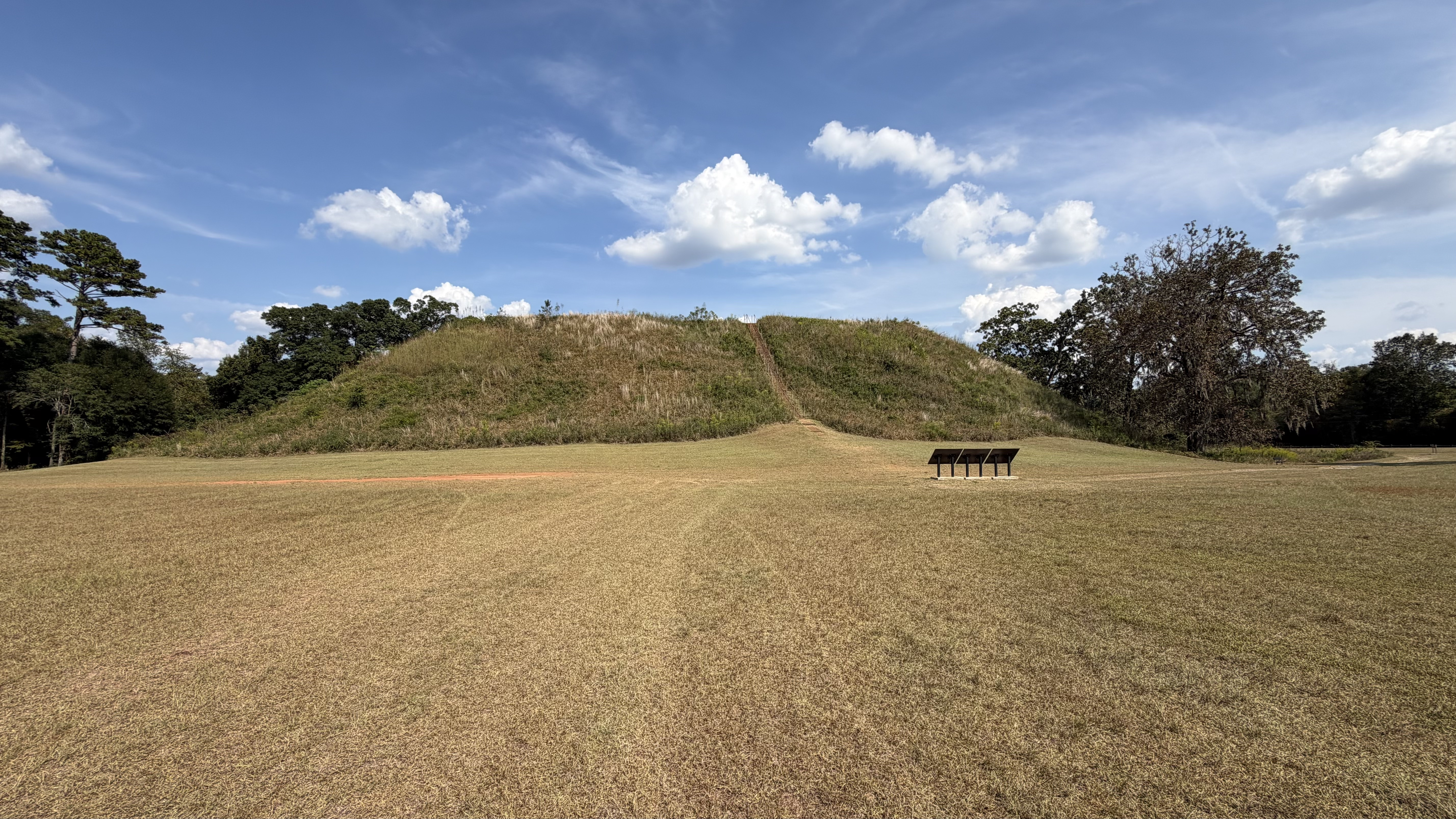
- Temple Mound

- Location within Georgia Location within the United States
- Nearest city: Blakely, Georgia
- Coordinates: 31°28′17.28″N 84°55′45.72″W
- NRHP reference No.: 66000280

Significant dates
- Added to NRHP: October 15, 1966
- Designated NHL: July 19, 1964

The Kolomoki Mounds is one of the largest and earliest Woodland period earthwork mound complexes in the Southeastern United States and is the largest in Georgia. Constructed from 350 to 600 CE, the mound complex is located in southwest Georgia, in present-day Early County near the Chattahoochee River.

The mounds were designated as a National Historic Landmark in 1964. Seven of the eight mounds are protected as part of Kolomoki Mounds State Historic Park.

== Site characteristics ==
Kolomoki Mounds State Park is an important archaeological site as well as a scenic recreational area. Kolomoki, covering approximately three hundred acres, is one of the larger preserved mound sites in the USA.

In the first millennium CE, Kolomoki, with its surrounding villages, Native American burial mounds, and ceremonial plaza, was a center of population and activity in North America. The eight visible mounds of earth in the park were built between 350 and 950 CE by peoples of the Swift Creek and Weeden Island cultures. These mounds include Georgia's oldest great temple mound, built on a flat platform top; two burial mounds, and four smaller ceremonial mounds.

As with many other mound complexes, the people sited and built the earthworks according to a complex cosmology. Researchers have noted that several mounds are aligned according to astronomical events. For example, mounds A, D, and E, which form the central axis of the site, align with the sun at the spring equinox. Mounds F and D form an alignment with the sun at the summer solstice.

Soils at the park are mostly dark red sandy loams or loamy sands of the Americus, Greenville, and Red Bay series. Some pale brown sands of the Troup series occur on the western shores of Kolomoki Lake, and at the northern end of the lake is brown or dark gray alluvial loam of the Herod-Muckalee soil association.

== Archaeological features ==
=== Temple Mound ===
The Temple Mound is 56 feet (17 m) high and measures 325 by 200 feet (61 m) at the base. Research indicates that it would have taken over two million basket loads carried by individual workers, each holding one cubic foot of earth, to build this mound. The southern half of the mound is three feet higher and was probably the temple platform. From the top of the steps, most of the Kolomoki Archaeological Area can be viewed. Approximately 1,500 - 2,000 residents lived in a village of thatched houses that were built around the large plaza in the center of the complex. It was a place for public ceremonial activities and rituals, including games.

=== Mound D ===
Mound D is one of the eight visible mounds at the Kolomoki site. It is a conical mound that is 20 feet (6.1 m) high from the ground. It is centrally located at Kolomoki. Archeologists discovered the remains of 77 burials and ceremonial pottery here. The effigy pottery discovered was shaped in various animal and bird shapes, such as deer, quail and owls.

Mound D was constructed in several stages, each time increasing in size. It began as a square-platform mound that was about 6 feet (1.8 m) tall. This original platform mound was built from yellow clay. Sixty pottery vessels were placed on the east wall including the above effigy pottery.

After many subsequent burials and the addition of more yellow clay in layers, the mound was shaped as a larger circular mound about 10 feet (3.0 m) tall. These burials took place on the eastern side of the mound, and the skulls face eastward, the direction of the rising sun, apparently for religious reasons. Burial objects made from iron and copper and pearl beads were included as ceremonial objects with the burials. Finally, the entire mound was covered with red clay.

== Museum ==
The park's museum was built to incorporate part of an excavated mound; it provides an authentic setting for viewing artifacts. The museum features a film about how this mound was built and excavated.

=== Thefts and recoveries ===
In March 1974, a thief entered the museum at the park and stole more than 129 ancient pots and effigies, numerous arrowheads, and other treasures. Every artifact on display was stolen. Several years later, many of the pieces were recovered by police and dealers in Miami and St. Augustine, Florida. But, with more than 70 relics still missing, the Georgia Department of Natural Resources (DNR) has sought public help in recovering these artifacts. Archeologists believe the pots are somewhere in Georgia or Florida, perhaps held by dealers or private collectors.

Park Manager Matt Bruner said,

These pieces are an important part of North American history and should be properly protected for future generations to study. They have significant meaning to the Native American people because many were used during burial ceremonies, plus they represent some of the finest craftsmanship of the Kolomoki culture.

He emphasized that the state is more interested in recovering the pots than prosecuting the people who have them.

On April 8, 2026, an anonymous man returned one pot, approximately 1,500 years old, to the park's visitor center. The man did not identify himself or explain why he had the pot, and he left before park staff could open the box containing the pot. The encounter was captured on CCTV surveillance footage. As of May 2026, the anonymous man is not considered a suspect in the original 1974 theft, per the Georgia Department of Natural Resources. Georgia DNR states that it plans to work “collaboratively with federally recognized tribal partners regarding this [returned] artifact and any future recoveries.”

== Gallery ==
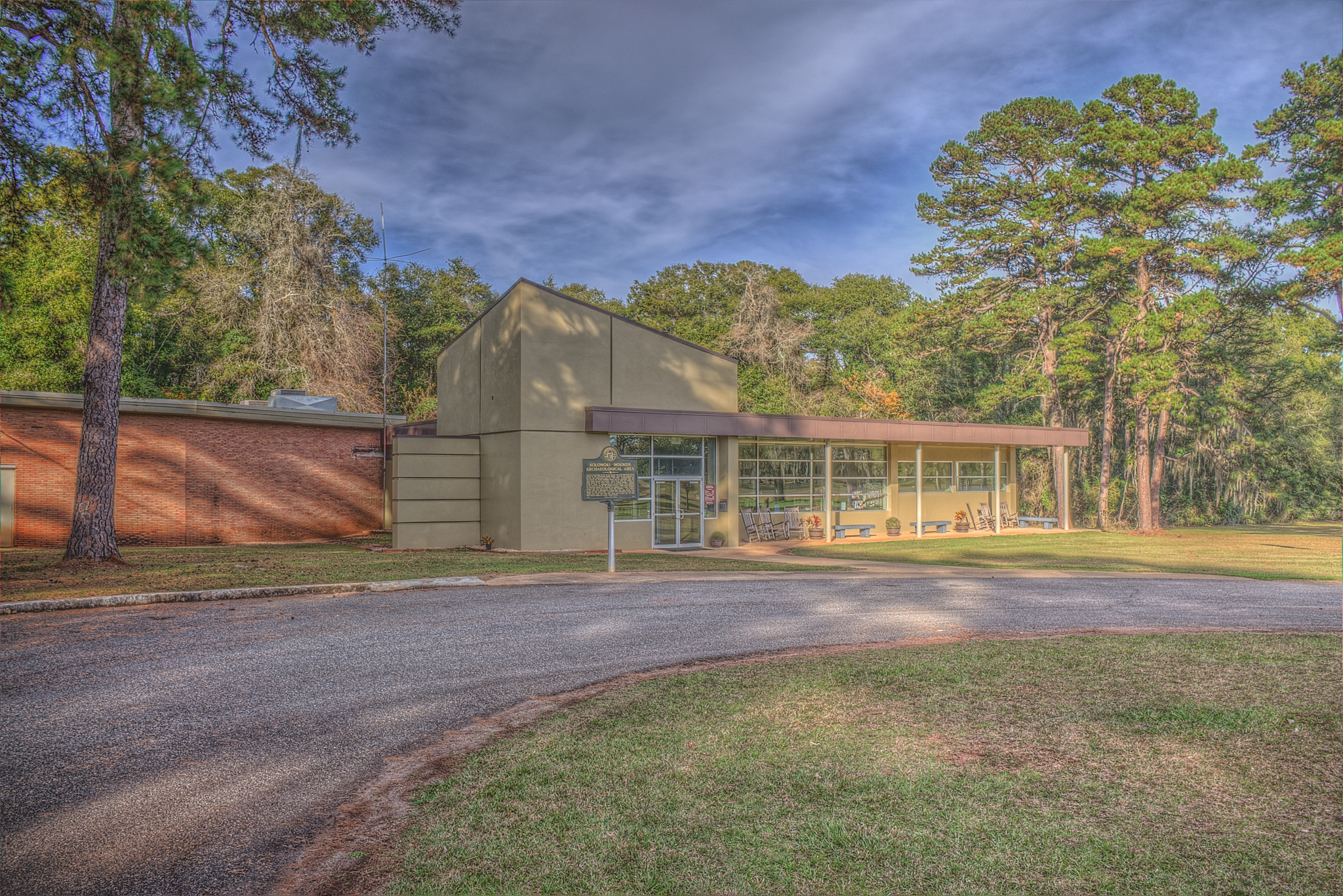
Visitor Center

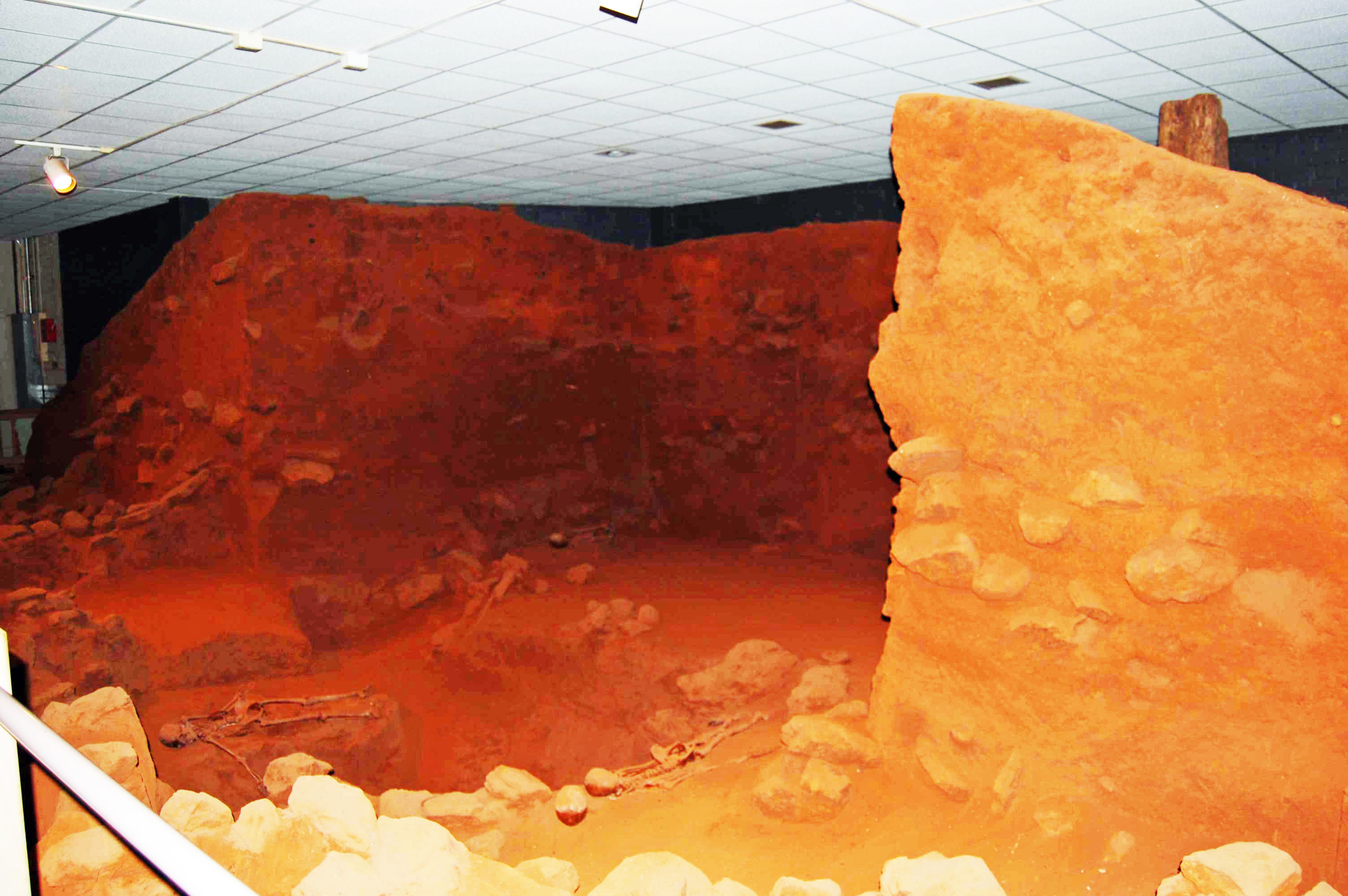
Inside of museum that was built around the burial mound archeological excavation

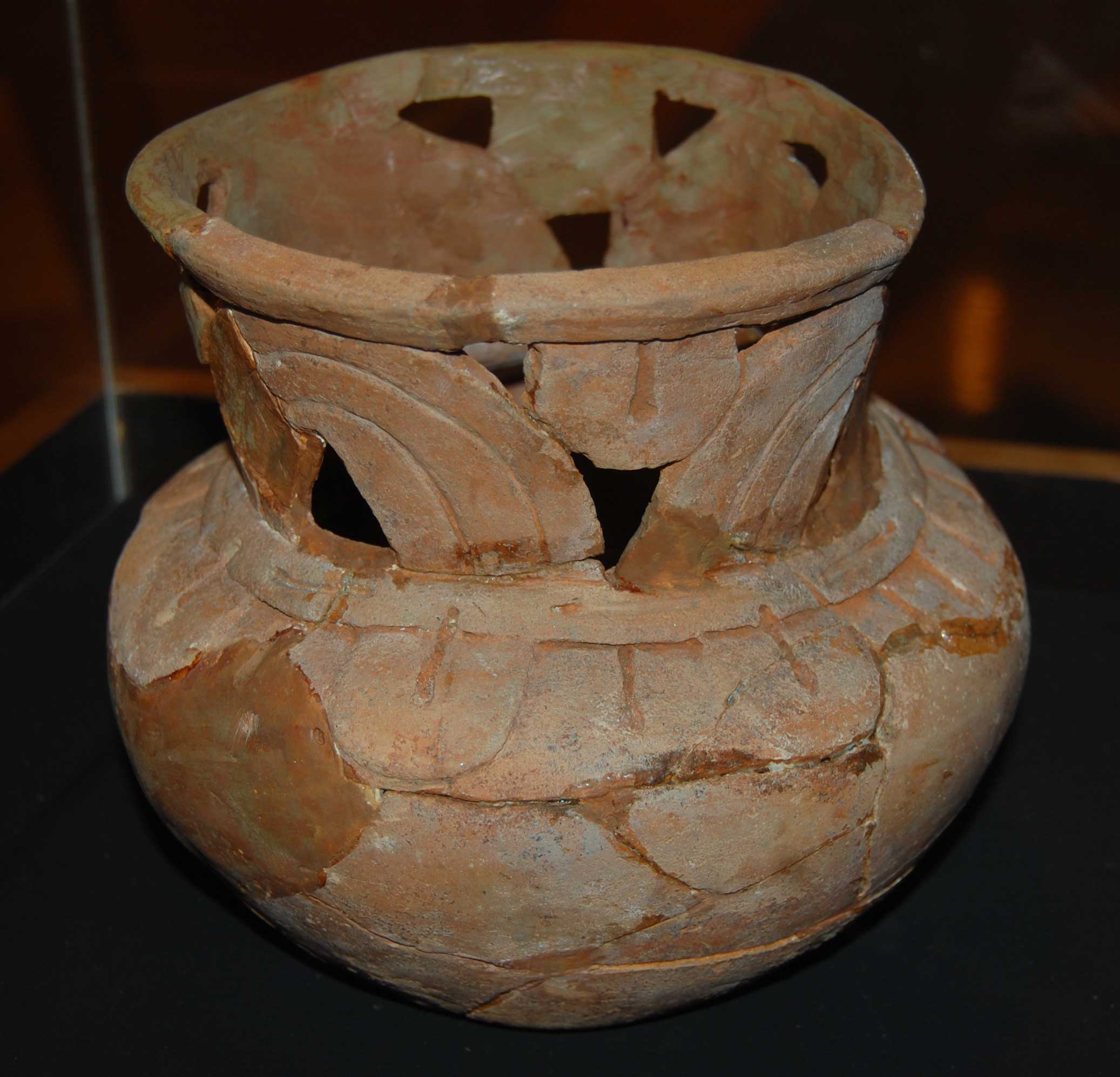
Artifact on display at Kolomoki museum

A pamphlet describing the Kolomoki Indian Mounds
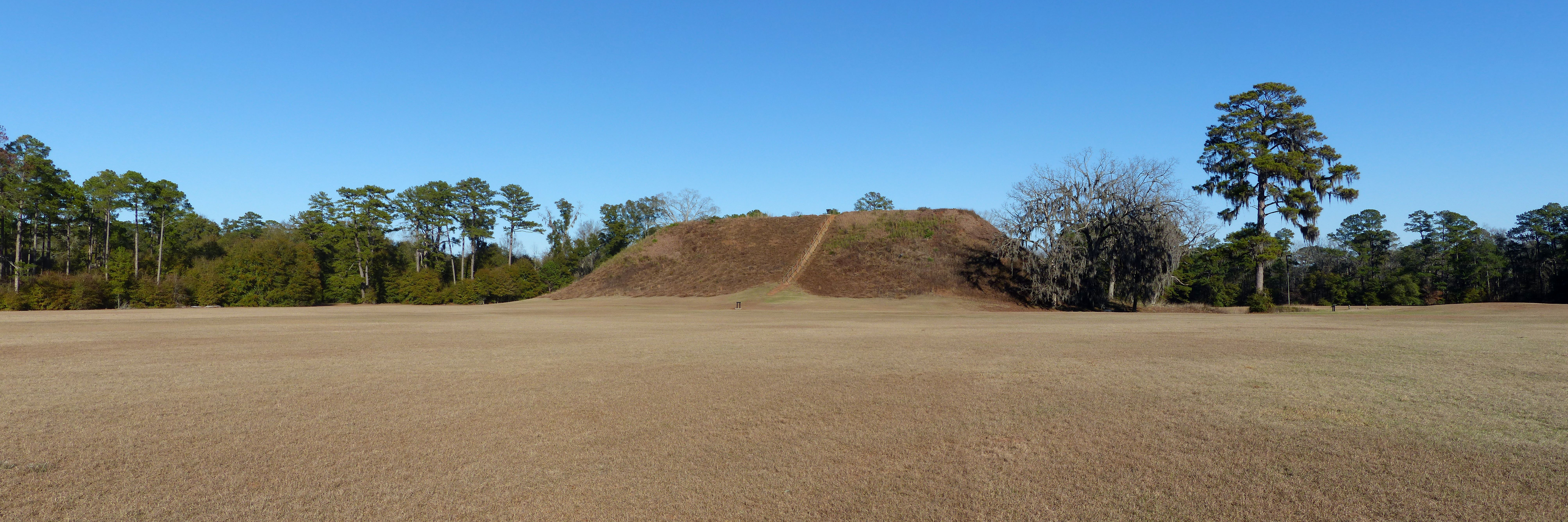
A view of the temple mound

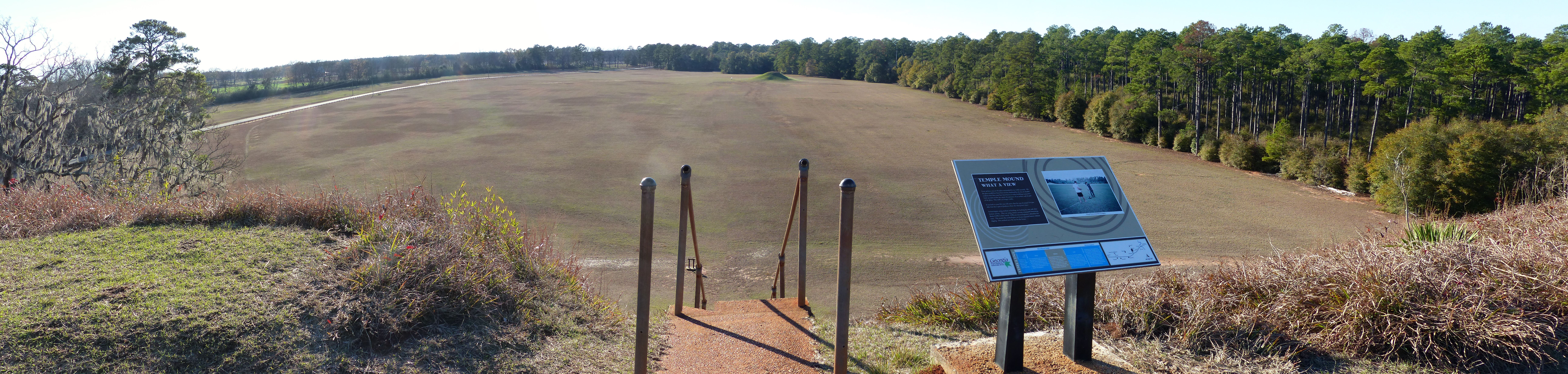
A view of the plaza from atop the temple mound

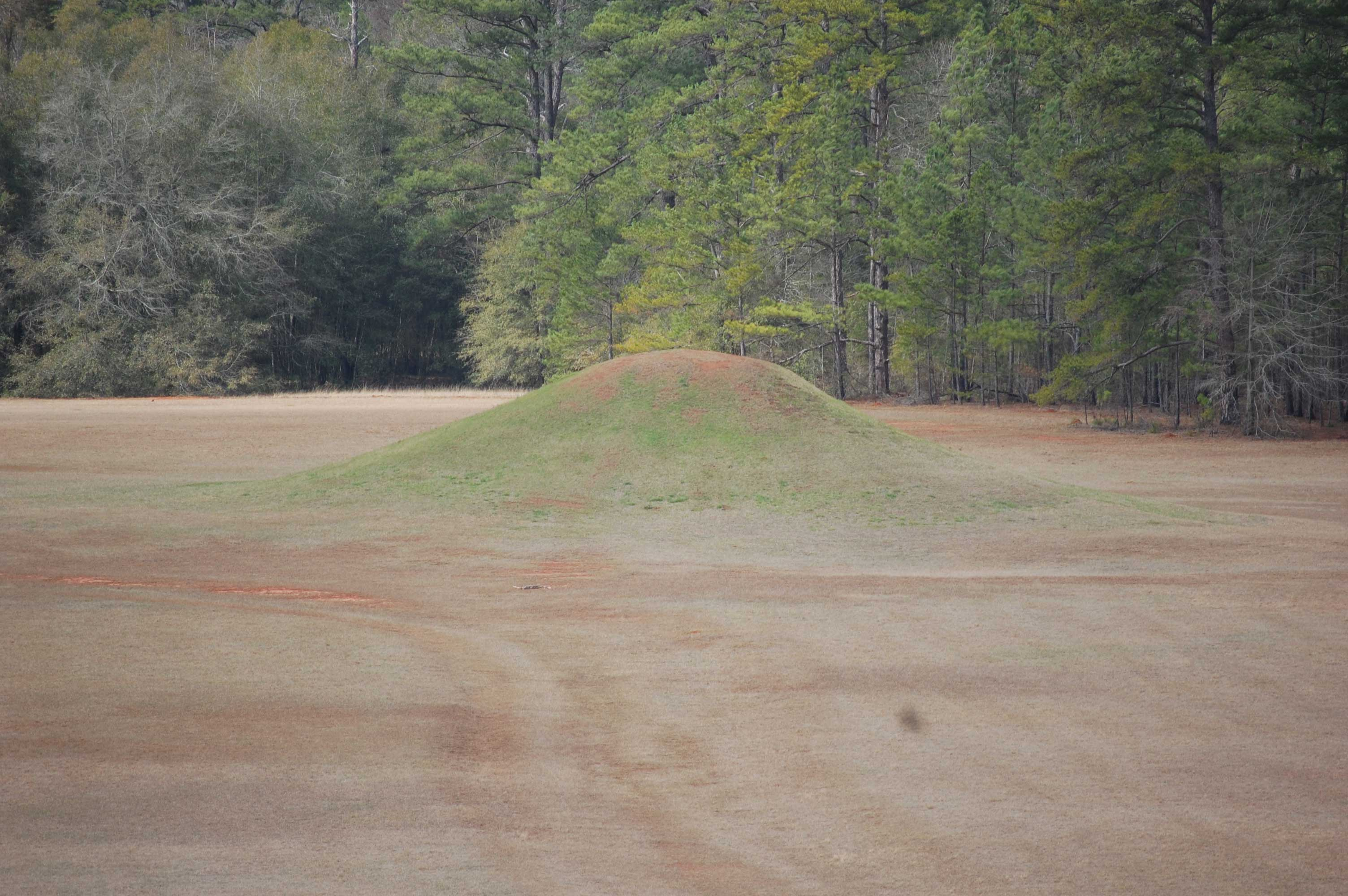
A smaller mound as seen from the top of the large mound

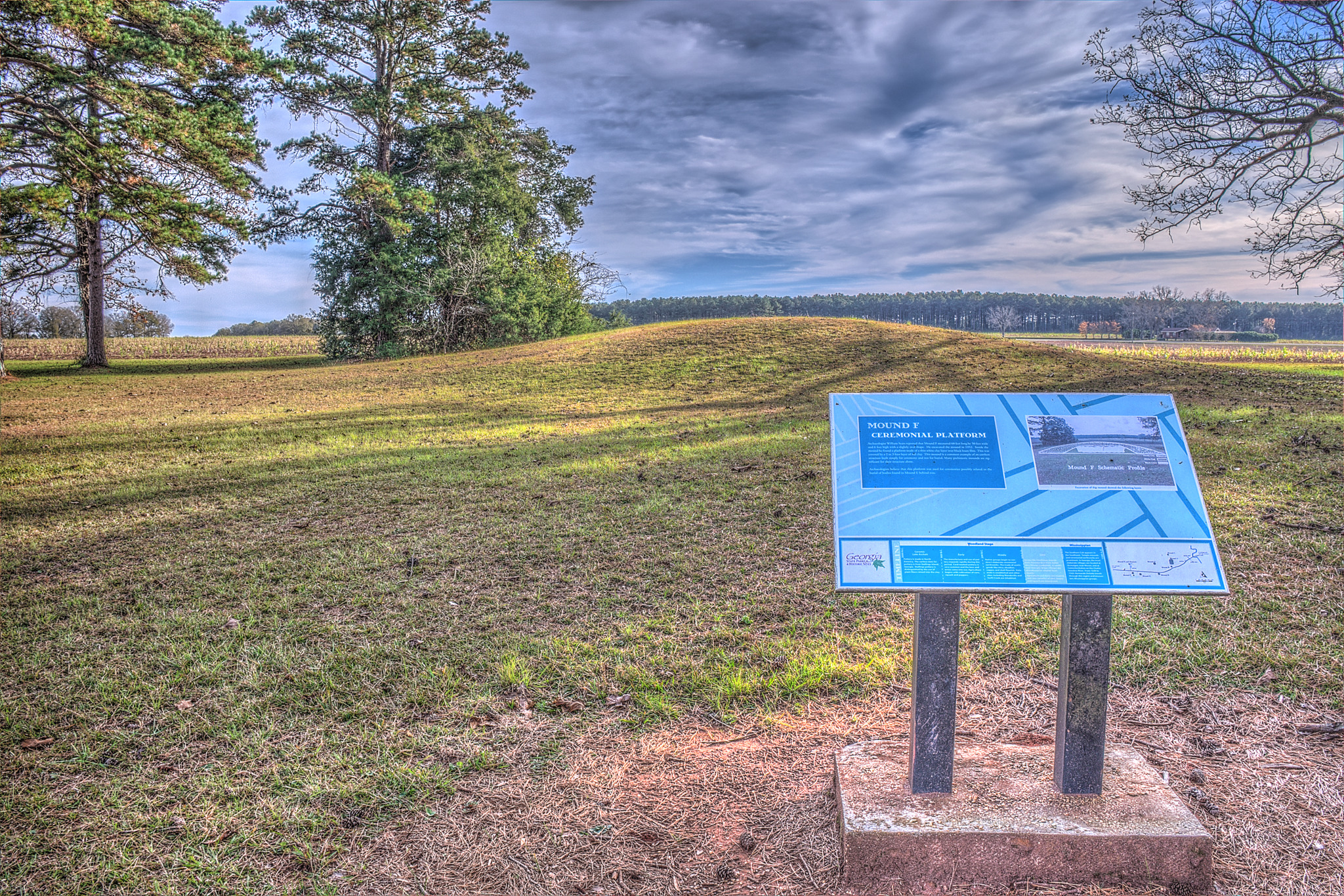
Ceremonial Platform (Mound F)

== See also ==
- Etowah Indian Mounds
- Ocmulgee Mounds National Historical Park
- List of National Historic Landmarks in Georgia (U.S. state)
- National Register of Historic Places listings in Early County, Georgia
