= Kolomoki Creek =

Stream in Georgia, United States

Coordinates: 31°31′1.61″N 85°2′38.74″W

Kolomoki Creek is a stream in the U.S. state of Georgia. It is a tributary to the Chattahoochee River.

Kolomoki Creek took its name from the Kolomoki Indians. Variant names are "Colomokee Creek", "Koo-loo- moo-kee Creek", and "Kooloomooke Creek".
