= Rail Management Corporation =

Rail company in Panama City Beach, Florida, US

Company logo

Durden Enterprises II Inc - Formally Rail Management Corporation (RMC), based in Panama City Beach, Florida, was a holding company of short line railroads in the southeastern United States.

== History ==
On May 26, 2005, Genesee and Wyoming (G&W) announced that it has agreed to purchase RMC's railroad operations. G&W will pay $243 million in cash and assume $1.7 million in company debt to gain control of 14 short line railroads from RMC across the southeastern United States, as of June 1, 2005. The owners of RMC would then use cash derived from the sale to purchase several radio stations, including WILN, WKMX, KDAY, and WYYX among others.

== Holdings ==
RMC held controlling interests in the following railroads:

- AN Railway
- Atlantic and Western Railway
- Bay Line Railroad
- Copper Basin Railway
- East Tennessee Railway
- Galveston Railroad
- Georgia Central Railway
- Kentucky West Tennessee (KWT)
- Little Rock and Western Railway
- Meridian and Bigbee Railroad
- Tomahawk Railway
- Valdosta Railway
- Western Kentucky Railway
- Wilmington Terminal Railroad
