= Early County, Georgia =

County in Georgia, United States

- County
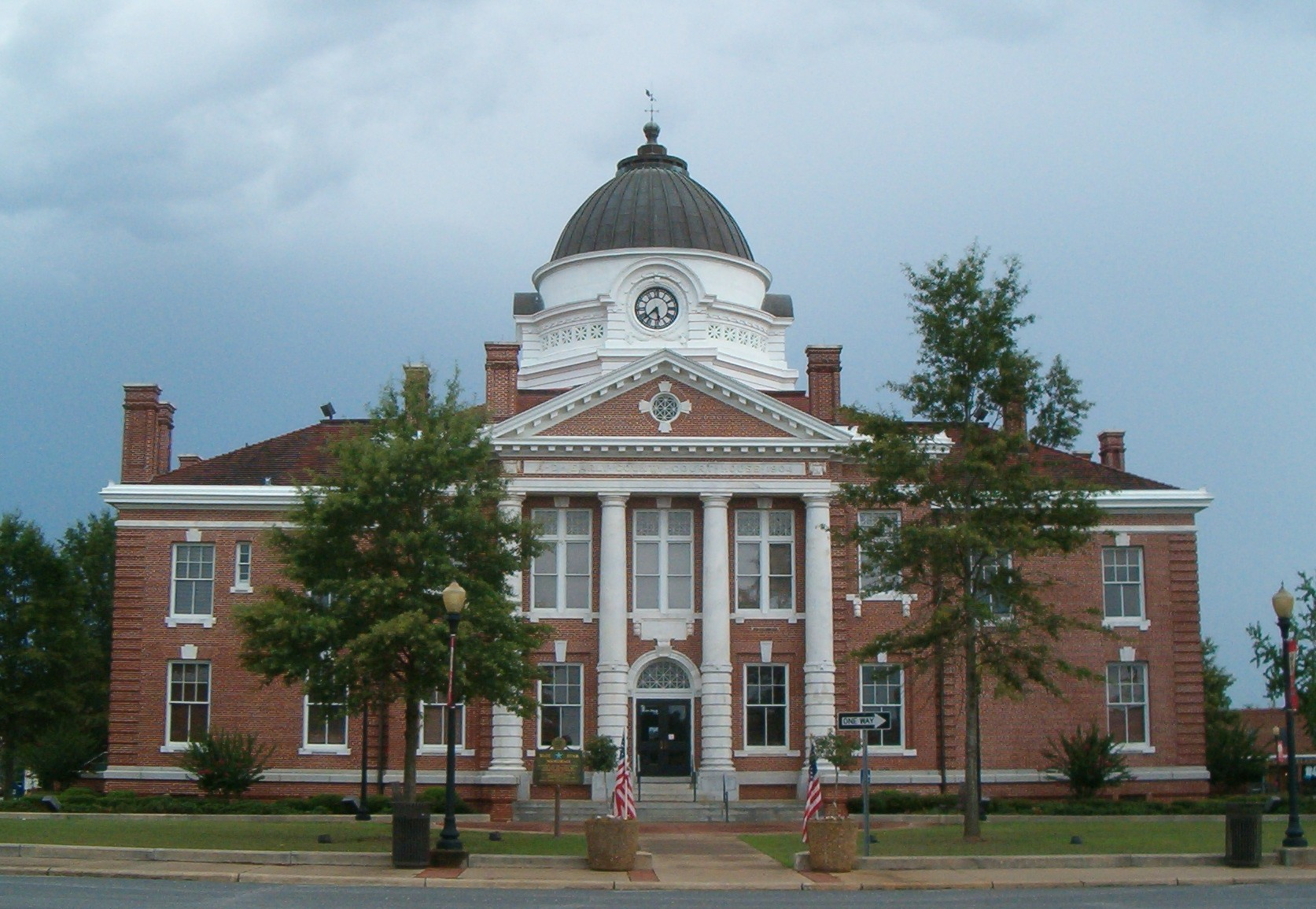
- Early County Courthouse in Blakely

- Location within the U.S. state of Georgia
- Coordinates: 31°20′N 84°55′W
- Country: United States
- State: Georgia
- Founded: 1818; 208 years ago
- Named for: Peter Early
- Seat: Blakely
- Largest city: Blakely

Area
  - Total: 516 sq mi (1,340 km^{2})
  - Land: 513 sq mi (1,330 km^{2})
  - Water: 3.8 sq mi (9.8 km^{2}) 0.7%

Population (2020)
  - Total: 10,854
  - Estimate (2025): 10,455 ▼
  - Density: 21/sq mi (8.1/km^{2})
- Time zone: UTC−5 (Eastern)
  - Summer (DST): UTC−4 (EDT)
- Congressional district: 2nd
- Website: earlycountyga.org

Early County is a county located on the southwest border of the U.S. state of Georgia. As of the 2020 census, the population was 10,854. The county seat is Blakely, where the Early County Courthouse is located. Created on December 15, 1818, it was named for Peter Early, 28th Governor of Georgia. The county is bordered on the west by the Chattahoochee River, forming the border with Alabama.

== History ==
Prehistoric and nineteenth-century history has been preserved in some of Early County's attractions. It is the site of the Kolomoki Mounds, a park preserving major earthworks built by indigenous peoples of the Woodland culture more than 1700 years ago, from 350 CE to 600 CE. This is one of the largest mound complexes in the United States and the largest in Georgia; it includes burial and ceremonial mounds. The siting of the mounds expresses the ancient people's cosmology, as mounds are aligned with the sun at the spring equinox and summer solstice.

The county area was long territory of the historic Creek Indian peoples of the Southeast, particularly along the Chattahoochee River. Beginning in the early nineteenth century, European-American settlers began to encroach on this territory, pushing the Muscogee out during Indian Removal in the 1830s. The Muscogee were forced to Indian Territory west of the Mississippi River.

This area was developed by European-American settlers and their African-American enslaved workers for cotton plantations. Agriculture was critical to the economy into the 20th century. The Cohelee Creek Bridge in the county is the southernmost covered bridge still standing. One of the last wooden flagpoles from the American Civil War era is located at the historic courthouse in downtown Blakely.

According to the Equal Justice Initiative, in the period from 1877 to 1950, Early County had 24 documented lynchings of African Americans, the second-highest total in the state after the more densely populated Fulton County. Most were committed around the turn of the 20th century, in the period of Jim Crow conditions and suppression of black voting. This was still a largely agricultural area, and some disputes arose from confrontations between black sharecroppers or tenant farmers and white landowners, particularly at times to settle accounts. Another, Sidney Grist, was lynched on December 31, 1896, for "political activity".

Among these cases were five African-American men lynched by whites in less than a month in the summer of 1899: three on July 23, one on July 25 (all reportedly for rape and robbery), and one on August 3 for attempted rape. Black men were frequently identified as suspects in such cases and lynched before any trial took place; further investigations have sometimes revealed consensual sex or other persons having committed the crime. A mass lynching took place in the county on December 30, 1915, when seven black men were lynched, allegedly as suspects in a murder.

== Geography ==
According to the U.S. Census Bureau, the county has a total area of 516 square miles (1,340 km^{2}), of which 513 square miles (1,330 km^{2}) is land and 3.8 square miles (9.8 km^{2}) (0.7%) is water.

The northeastern and eastern portions of Early County, east of Blakely, and extending south to a line east of Jakin, are located in the Spring Creek sub-basin of the ACF River Basin (Apalachicola-Chattahoochee-Flint River Basin). The western portion of the county is located in the Lower Chattahoochee River sub-basin of the same ACF River Basin.

=== Major highways ===
- U.S. Route 27 / State Route 1
  - U.S. Route 27 Business / State Route 1 Business
- U.S. Route 84 / State Route 38
- State Route 39
- State Route 45
- State Route 62
  - State Route 62 Bypass
- State Route 200
- State Route 216
- State Route 273
  - State Route 273 Spur
- State Route 370

=== Adjacent counties ===
- Clay County (north)
- Calhoun County (northeast)
- Baker County (east)
- Miller County (southeast)
- Seminole County (south or east)
- Houston County, Alabama (southwest/CST Border)
- Henry County, Alabama (west/CST Border)

== Communities ==
=== Cities ===
- Arlington (shared with Calhoun County)
- Blakely
- Damascus
- Jakin

=== Census designated places ===
- Cedar Springs

=== Unincorporated communities ===
- Colomokee
- Cuba
- Freeman
- Hentown
- Hilton
- Jones Crossroads
- Killarney
- Lucile
- New Hope
- Nicholasville
- Old Damascus
- Rock Hill
- Rowena
- Saffold
- Urquhart

== Demographics ==
Historical population
Census	Pop.	Note	%±
1820	768		—
1830	2,051		167.1%
1840	5,444		165.4%
1850	7,246		33.1%
1860	6,149		−15.1%
1870	6,998		13.8%
1880	7,611		8.8%
1890	9,792		28.7%
1900	14,828		51.4%
1910	18,122		22.2%
1920	18,983		4.8%
1930	18,273		−3.7%
1940	18,679		2.2%
1950	17,413		−6.8%
1960	13,151		−24.5%
1970	12,682		−3.6%
1980	13,158		3.8%
1990	11,854		−9.9%
2000	12,354		4.2%
2010	11,008		−10.9%
2020	10,854		−1.4%
2025 (est.)	10,455	▼	−3.7%
U.S. Decennial Census; 1790-1880 1890-1910; 1920-1930 1930-1940; 1940-1950 1960-1980; 1980-2000 2010 2020

=== Racial and ethnic composition ===
Early County, Georgia – Racial and ethnic composition Note: the US Census treats Hispanic/Latino as an ethnic category. This table excludes Latinos from the racial categories and assigns them to a separate category. Hispanics/Latinos may be of any race.
Race / Ethnicity (NH = Non-Hispanic)	Pop 1980	Pop 1990	Pop 2000	Pop 2010	Pop 2020	% 1980	% 1990	% 2000	% 2010	% 2020
White alone (NH)	7,417	6,570	6,159	5,250	4,813	56.37%	55.42%	49.85%	47.69%	44.34%
Black or African American alone (NH)	5,538	5,194	5,901	5,441	5,534	42.09%	43.82%	47.77%	49.43%	50.99%
Native American or Alaska Native alone (NH)	1	31	23	34	31	0.01%	0.26%	0.19%	0.31%	0.29%
Asian alone (NH)	12	13	23	37	47	0.09%	0.11%	0.19%	0.34%	0.43%
Native Hawaiian or Pacific Islander alone (NH)	x	x	7	2	0	x	x	0.06%	0.02%	0.00%
Other race alone (NH)	1	1	5	5	11	0.01%	0.01%	0.04%	0.05%	0.10%
Mixed race or Multiracial (NH)	x	x	84	68	232	x	x	0.68%	0.62%	2.14%
Hispanic or Latino (any race)	189	45	152	171	186	1.44%	0.38%	1.23%	1.55%	1.71%
Total	13,158	11,854	12,354	11,008	10,854	100.00%	100.00%	100.00%	100.00%	100.00%

=== 2020 census ===
As of the 2020 census, the county had a population of 10,854, 4,312 households, and 2,659 families.

The median age was 42.5 years, with 23.4% of residents under the age of 18 and 20.3% 65 years of age or older; for every 100 females there were 89.9 males and for every 100 females age 18 and over there were 86.4 males. 0.0% of residents lived in urban areas, while 100.0% lived in rural areas.

The racial makeup of the county was 44.8% White, 51.2% Black or African American, 0.3% American Indian and Alaska Native, 0.4% Asian, 0.0% Native Hawaiian and Pacific Islander, 0.6% from some other race, and 2.6% from two or more races. Hispanic or Latino residents of any race comprised 1.7% of the population.

There were 4,312 households in the county, of which 31.1% had children under the age of 18 living with them and 38.1% had a female householder with no spouse or partner present. About 28.7% of all households were made up of individuals and 14.3% had someone living alone who was 65 years of age or older.

There were 4,918 housing units, of which 12.3% were vacant. Among occupied housing units, 65.9% were owner-occupied and 34.1% were renter-occupied. The homeowner vacancy rate was 1.7% and the rental vacancy rate was 4.2%.

== Education ==
The Early County School District holds grades pre-school to grade twelve, and consists of one elementary school, a middle school, and a high school. The district has 156 full-time teachers and over 2,764 students.

- Early County Elementary School
- Early County Middle School
- Early County High School

== Politics ==
Despite being a majority-black county, Early County leans Republican. As recently as 2012, the county voted Democratic for president, backing Barack Obama over Mitt Romney. However, Early County voted for GOP nominee Donald Trump thrice consecutively since then, including even as Joe Biden defeated Trump statewide in 2020. In the 2022 midterms, Governor Brian Kemp carried it by 19.5 points, while Secretary of State Brad Raffensperger carried it by over 21%, and in 2024, Trump won the county by double-digits over Kamala Harris.

For elections to the United States House of Representatives, Early County is part of Georgia's 2nd congressional district, currently represented by Sanford Bishop. For elections to the Georgia State Senate, Early County is part of District 12. For elections to the Georgia House of Representatives, Early County is part of District 154.

United States presidential election results for Early County, Georgia
Year	Republican		Democratic		Third party(ies)	
Year	No.	%	No.	%	No.	%
1912	7	1.31%	501	93.64%	27	5.05%
1916	4	0.88%	442	97.14%	9	1.98%
1920	34	8.19%	381	91.81%	0	0.00%
1924	22	5.06%	351	80.69%	62	14.25%
1928	231	25.52%	674	74.48%	0	0.00%
1932	19	1.65%	1,131	98.18%	2	0.17%
1936	46	3.98%	1,107	95.68%	4	0.35%
1940	104	5.60%	1,751	94.29%	2	0.11%
1944	77	4.21%	1,753	95.79%	0	0.00%
1948	94	6.95%	1,110	82.04%	149	11.01%
1952	307	14.55%	1,803	85.45%	0	0.00%
1956	193	9.60%	1,818	90.40%	0	0.00%
1960	254	11.77%	1,904	88.23%	0	0.00%
1964	2,398	75.67%	771	24.33%	0	0.00%
1968	327	8.37%	785	20.08%	2,797	71.55%
1972	2,396	82.37%	513	17.63%	0	0.00%
1976	1,157	32.48%	2,405	67.52%	0	0.00%
1980	1,538	41.77%	2,110	57.31%	34	0.92%
1984	2,239	59.98%	1,494	40.02%	0	0.00%
1988	1,918	58.46%	1,359	41.42%	4	0.12%
1992	1,457	35.17%	1,970	47.55%	716	17.28%
1996	1,374	41.98%	1,648	50.35%	251	7.67%
2000	1,938	54.06%	1,622	45.24%	25	0.70%
2004	2,495	59.14%	1,701	40.32%	23	0.55%
2008	2,711	50.74%	2,603	48.72%	29	0.54%
2012	2,557	47.71%	2,765	51.60%	37	0.69%
2016	2,552	53.13%	2,168	45.14%	83	1.73%
2020	2,710	52.24%	2,450	47.22%	28	0.54%
2024	2,718	55.71%	2,158	44.23%	3	0.06%

United States Senate election results for Early County, Georgia2
Year	Republican		Democratic		Third party(ies)	
Year	No.	%	No.	%	No.	%
2020	2,796	54.77%	2,232	43.72%	77	1.51%
2020	2,368	52.04%	2,182	47.96%	0	0.00%

United States Senate election results for Early County, Georgia3
Year	Republican		Democratic		Third party(ies)	
Year	No.	%	No.	%	No.	%
2020	1,314	26.44%	1,005	20.23%	2,650	53.33%
2020	2,377	52.25%	2,172	47.75%	0	0.00%
2022	2,377	51.93%	2,172	47.45%	28	0.61%
2022	2,010	54.87%	1,653	45.13%	0	0.00%

Georgia Gubernatorial election results for Early County
Year	Republican		Democratic		Third party(ies)	
Year	No.	%	No.	%	No.	%
2022	2,321	59.39%	1,576	40.33%	11	0.28%

== See also ==
- National Register of Historic Places listings in Early County, Georgia
- List of counties in Georgia
