= Cedar Springs, Georgia =

- Unincorporated community Census-designated place
- Location within Georgia
- Coordinates: 31°11′01″N 85°02′17″W
- Country: United States
- State: Georgia
- County: Early

Area
  - Total: 2.98 sq mi (7.71 km^{2})
  - Land: 2.98 sq mi (7.71 km^{2})
  - Water: 0 sq mi (0.00 km^{2})
- Elevation: 151 ft (46 m)

Population (2020)
  - Total: 75
  - Density: 25.2/sq mi (9.72/km^{2})
- Time zone: UTC-5 (Eastern (EST))
  - Summer (DST): UTC-4 (EDT)
- ZIP code: 39832
- Area code: 229
- GNIS feature ID: 312495

Cedar Springs is an unincorporated community and census-designated place (CDP) in Early County, Georgia, United States. At the time of the 2020 census, the population was 75. Cedar Springs has a post office with ZIP code 39832. Georgia State Route 273 passes through the community. Georgia Pacific is 2 miles southwest from it.

The community was so named on account of a number of mineral springs near the original town site.

== Demographics ==
Historical population
| Census | Pop. | Note | %± |
|---|---|---|---|
| 2010 | 74 | | — |
| 2020 | 75 | | 1.4% |
U.S. Decennial Census; 1850-1870 1870-1880; 1890-1910 1920-1930; 1940 1950 1960; 1970 1980 1990; 2000 2010 2020

=== 2020 census ===
Cedar Springs was first listed as a census designated place in the 2010 U.S. census.

Cedar Springs CDP, Georgia – Racial and ethnic composition Note: the US Census treats Hispanic/Latino as an ethnic category. This table excludes Latinos from the racial categories and assigns them to a separate category. Hispanics/Latinos may be of any race.
| Race / Ethnicity (NH = Non-Hispanic) | Pop 2010 | Pop 2020 | % 2010 | % 2020 |
|---|---|---|---|---|
| White alone (NH) | 66 | 73 | 89.19% | 97.33% |
| Black or African American alone (NH) | 6 | 0 | 8.11% | 0.00% |
| Native American or Alaska Native alone (NH) | 1 | 0 | 1.35% | 0.00% |
| Asian alone (NH) | 0 | 1 | 0.00% | 1.33% |
| Pacific Islander alone (NH) | 0 | 0 | 0.00% | 0.00% |
| Some Other Race alone (NH) | 0 | 1 | 0.00% | 1.33% |
| Mixed Race or Multi-Racial (NH) | 0 | 0 | 0.00% | 0.00% |
| Hispanic or Latino (any race) | 1 | 0 | 1.35% | 0.00% |
| Total | 74 | 75 | 100.00% | 100.00% |
