= Hilton, Georgia =

Unincorporated community in Georgia, U.S.

Coordinates: 31°17′18″N 85°03′55″W

Hilton is an unincorporated community in Early County, Georgia, United States, east of the Chattahoochee River and Columbia, Alabama and west of Blakely. Georgia State Route 62 (SR 62) and Georgia State Route 370 (SR 370) pass through the community. SR 370 ends in Hilton on SR 62. SR 62 ends two miles west of the community. Alabama State Route 52 ends at the Georgia state line, east of Hilton.

== History ==
Hilton was founded about 1880, and named after Elisha Hilton, a local merchant.

The Georgia General Assembly incorporated the place in 1889 as the Town of Hilton. The town's charter was dissolved in 1995.
