= Jakin, Georgia =

- City
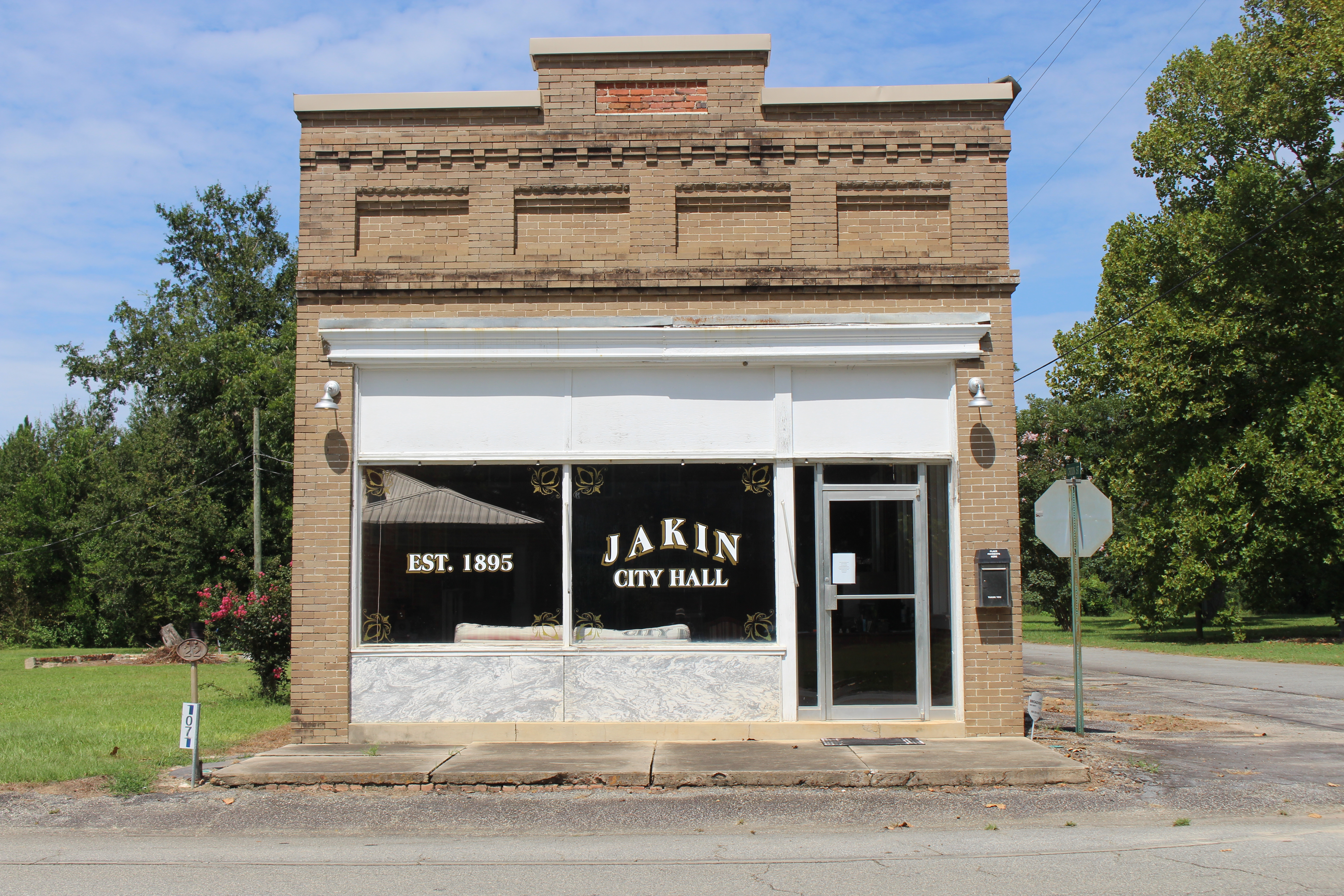
- Jakin City Hall

- Location in Early County and the state of Georgia
- Coordinates: 31°5′26″N 84°58′59″W
- Country: United States
- State: Georgia
- County: Early

Government
  - Type: Mayor-council government
  - Mayor: Melanie Rogers
  - Jakin City Council: Members: Kenneth Holt; Kevin Naramore; Danny Worrell; Jeweltine Groomes

Area
  - Total: 1.24 sq mi (3.21 km^{2})
  - Land: 1.24 sq mi (3.21 km^{2})
  - Water: 0 sq mi (0.00 km^{2})
- Elevation: 144 ft (44 m)

Population (2020)
  - Total: 131
  - Density: 105.6/sq mi (40.78/km^{2})
- Time zone: UTC-5 (Eastern (EST))
  - Summer (DST): UTC-4 (EDT)
- ZIP codes: 31761, 39861
- Area code: 229
- FIPS code: 13-41792
- GNIS feature ID: 0316032
- Website: www.ircusa.com/jakin/

Jakin is a city in Early County, Georgia, United States. Incorporated in 1895, Jakin's population was 131 in 2020.

== History ==
Early County was created by an act of the General Assembly on December 15, 1818. Land lots of 250 acres (1.0 km^{2}) surveyed in 1819 and 1820 were distributed by the state in lotteries. Jakin is in the 26th land district in the southernmost end of the county.

As early as 1817 settlers began moving into the area and began to build on the old Indian paths along the river. These old paths became the Old River Road in 1820 and a post road by the mid-1820s. The post riders were often harassed by Indians. As the forests along the river were cleared, large plantations and fine frame homes began to appear. The Chattahoochee River, 3 miles (5 km) to the west, was the main source of transportation, bearing downstream huge square-cut timbers to Apalachicola, Florida, for ship building and turpentine for export, and bearing cotton upstream to the cotton mills in Columbus. In 1821 the Armstrong and Attaway Company built the first cotton gin at nearby Saffold Navy Yard.

The first families established here were the Allens, Rambos, Donalsons, Harrells, Shewmakes, Saffolds, Johnsons, Hayes, Gibsons, Crawfords, and Moodys. In 1828 a road was made from Blakely to Bainbridge on which settled the Hodges, Warrens, Minters, Easoms and Perrys. These families pioneered what became Jakin.

In May 1878 C.A. Minter, a physician, purchased three lots, roughly 750 acres (3.0 km^{2}) of land, for $10 and a shotgun. The first mayor of Jakin, James Morris "Major" Bivings, named the town "Jakin" after one of the columns of Solomon's Temple.

In addition to small farm agriculture, Jakin's early economic growth resulted from turpentine. The unspoiled longleaf pine forests were prime resources, first for turpentine then lumber. Bivings and his partner, James W. Duke of Chicago, founded the Duke and Bivings Lumber Company complete with housing, commissary and post office. Bivings served as the first postmaster. On January 3, 1898, the Flowers Company purchased the lumber mill for $20,000. In addition to machines, buildings and materials, the purchase included 160 acres (0.6 km^{2}) of land and a railway. According to published town history, an estimated 1,000 workers were employed by the mill. In 1903 Jakin's population was 2,000. World War I and deforestation led to the closure of the lumber mill in 1918.

Agriculture served as Jakin's main industry until 1963, with Great Northern Nekoosa's purchase of a family-owned lumber mill which later became Great Southern Paper, which also ran a plywood mill in nearby Cedar Springs. Great Southern Paper was acquired by Georgia-Pacific in 1990. In 2005 GP was acquired by the privately held Koch Industries. Despite changing ownership, the mill has operated continuously.

== Geography ==
Jakin is located in southern Early County at 31°5′26″N 84°58′59″W (31.090574, -84.983179). U.S. Route 84 passes through the southern part of the town, leading southeast 7 miles (11 km) to Donalsonville and northwest 26 miles (42 km) to Dothan, Alabama. Blakely, the Early County seat, is 21 miles (34 km) to the north via Jakin Road.

According to the United States Census Bureau, Jakin has a total area of 1.2 square miles (3.2 km^{2}), all land.

== Demographics ==
Historical population
Census	Pop.	Note	%±
1900	267		—
1910	622		133.0%
1920	430		−30.9%
1930	306		−28.8%
1940	264		−13.7%
1950	264		0.0%
1960	176		−33.3%
1970	172		−2.3%
1980	194		12.8%
1990	137		−29.4%
2000	157		14.6%
2010	155		−1.3%
2020	131		−15.5%
U.S. Decennial Census; 1850-1870 1870-1880; 1890-1910 1920-1930; 1940 1950 1960; 1970 1980 1990; 2000 2010

As of the census of 2000, there were 157 people, 71 households, and 42 families residing in the city. In 2020, its population was 131.

== Education ==
Jakin is served by the Early County School District schools in Blakely: Early County Elementary School, Early County Middle School, and Early County High School.

It was formerly the site of Jakin High School.

== Notable person ==
- Isabelle Daniels Holston, 1956 Olympic bronze medal winner
