= National Register of Historic Places listings in Decatur County, Georgia =

This is a list of properties and districts in Decatur County, Georgia that are listed on the National Register of Historic Places (NRHP).

This National Park Service list is complete through NPS recent listings posted March 21, 2025.

== Current listings ==
	Name on the Register	Image	Date listed	Location	City or town	Description
1	Allen Mercantile Company	Allen Mercantile Company	December 31, 2002 (#02001632)	102 Main St. 30°52′32″N 84°25′54″W	Climax	
2	Bainbridge Commercial Historic District	Bainbridge Commercial Historic District	November 6, 1987 (#87001908)	Roughly bounded by Water, Clark, Troupe, West, Broughton, & Crawford Sts. 30°54′21″N 84°34′32″W	Bainbridge	
3	Bainbridge Residential Historic District	Bainbridge Residential Historic District	November 5, 1987 (#87001907)	Roughly bounded by Calhoun, Scott, Evans, College, & Washington Sts. 30°54′14″N 84°34′26″W	Bainbridge	
4	Brinson Family Historic District		October 2, 1986 (#86002677)	Bainbridge, Wainhurst and Leon Sts. 30°58′35″N 84°44′13″W	Brinson	
5	J. W. Callahan House	J. W. Callahan House	December 12, 1976 (#76000616)	200 Evans St. 30°54′07″N 84°34′32″W	Bainbridge	
6	Curry Hill Plantation	Curry Hill Plantation	January 29, 1973 (#73000620)	6 mi. E of Bainbridge on U.S. 84; 30°52′58″N 84°27′57″W	Bainbridge	
7	Decatur County Courthouse	Decatur County Courthouse	September 18, 1980 (#80001011)	West and Water Sts. 30°54′24″N 84°34′37″W	Bainbridge	
8	First African Missionary Baptist Church	First African Missionary Baptist Church	January 28, 2002 (#01001535)	515 Webster St. 30°54′36″N 84°34′22″W	Bainbridge	
