= Callahan House =

Callahan House may refer to:

in the United States

(by state then city)

- Matthew Callahan Log Cabin, Aspen, Colorado, listed on the National Register of Historic Places (NRHP) in Pitkin County
- T. M. Callahan House, Longmont, Colorado, listed on the NRHP in Boulder County
- J. W. Callahan House, Bainbridge, Georgia, listed on the NRHP in Decatur County
- John Callahan House, Annapolis, Maryland, listed on the NRHP in Anne Arundel County
- Pinkney-Callahan House, Annapolis, Maryland, listed on the NRHP in Anne Arundel County
- Callahan House (Milford, Pennsylvania), listed on the NRHP in Pike County
- John L. Callahan House, La Crosse, Wisconsin, listed on the NRHP in La Crosse County
