= City Hall and Firehouse =

- U.S. National Register of Historic Places
- U.S. Historic district – Contributing property
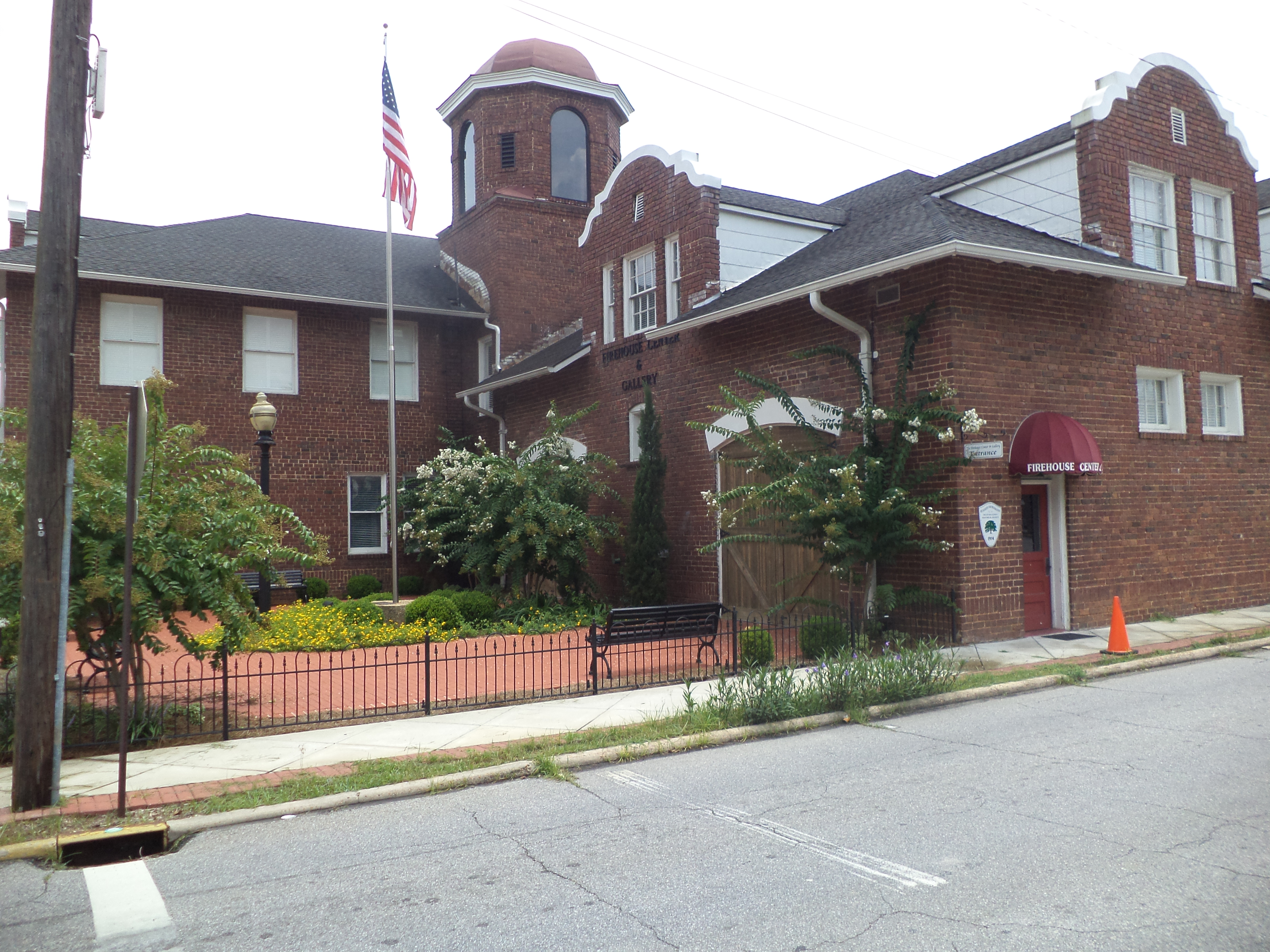

- Location within Georgia
- Location: Bainbridge, Georgia
- Coordinates: 30.90644°N 84.57697°W
- Built: 1914
- Architect: William Augustus Edwards
- Architectural style: 20th Century Revival
- Part of: Bainbridge Commercial Historic District
- NRHP reference No.: 87001908
- Added to NRHP: 1987-11-06

The City Hall and Firehouse, built in 1914, is a historic city hall and fire station building located on the corner of Crawford and Water streets in Bainbridge, Georgia. It was designed by Atlanta-based architect William Augustus Edwards who designed nine South Carolina courthouses as well as academic buildings at twelve institutions in Florida, Georgia and South Carolina. It is a contributing property in the Bainbridge Commercial Historic District, which was added to the National Register of Historic Places on 6 November 1987.

In March 1995, the Bainbridge-Decatur County Arts Council bought the building from the City of Bainbridge. It is now the Firehouse Arts Center.

== See also ==
- National Register of Historic Places listings in Decatur County, Georgia
