= Decatur County School District =

School district in Georgia (U.S. state)

Address
- 1417 Dothan Road Bainbridge, Georgia, 39817-3679; United States
- Coordinates: 30.905888°N 84.576467°W

District information
- Grades: Pre-school - 12
- Superintendent: Dr. Boyd English
- Accreditations: Southern Association of Colleges and Schools; Georgia Accrediting Commission

Students and staff
- Enrollment: 5,782
- Faculty: 384

Other information
- Telephone: (229) 248-2200
- Fax: (229) 248-2252
- Website: www.dcboe.com

The Decatur County School District is a public school district in Decatur County, Georgia, United States, based in Bainbridge. It serves the communities of Attapulgus, Bainbridge, Brinson, and Climax.

== History ==
In 2021 the district changed grade alignment, putting 6th grade into middle school and splitting elementary into Pre-K through 2nd schools and a 3rd through 5th school.

== Schools ==
The Decatur County School District has one elementary school, one middle school, two primary schools and one high school.

=== High school ===
- Bainbridge High School

=== Middle school ===
- Bainbridge Middle School

=== Elementary/Primary schools ===
- Hutto Elementary School
- West Bainbridge Primary School
- Jones Wheat Primary School

=== Other ===
- New Beginnings Learning Center - Will move to Potter Street facility (for grades 6-12)
