= James Butler (defensive back) =

American football player (born 1982)

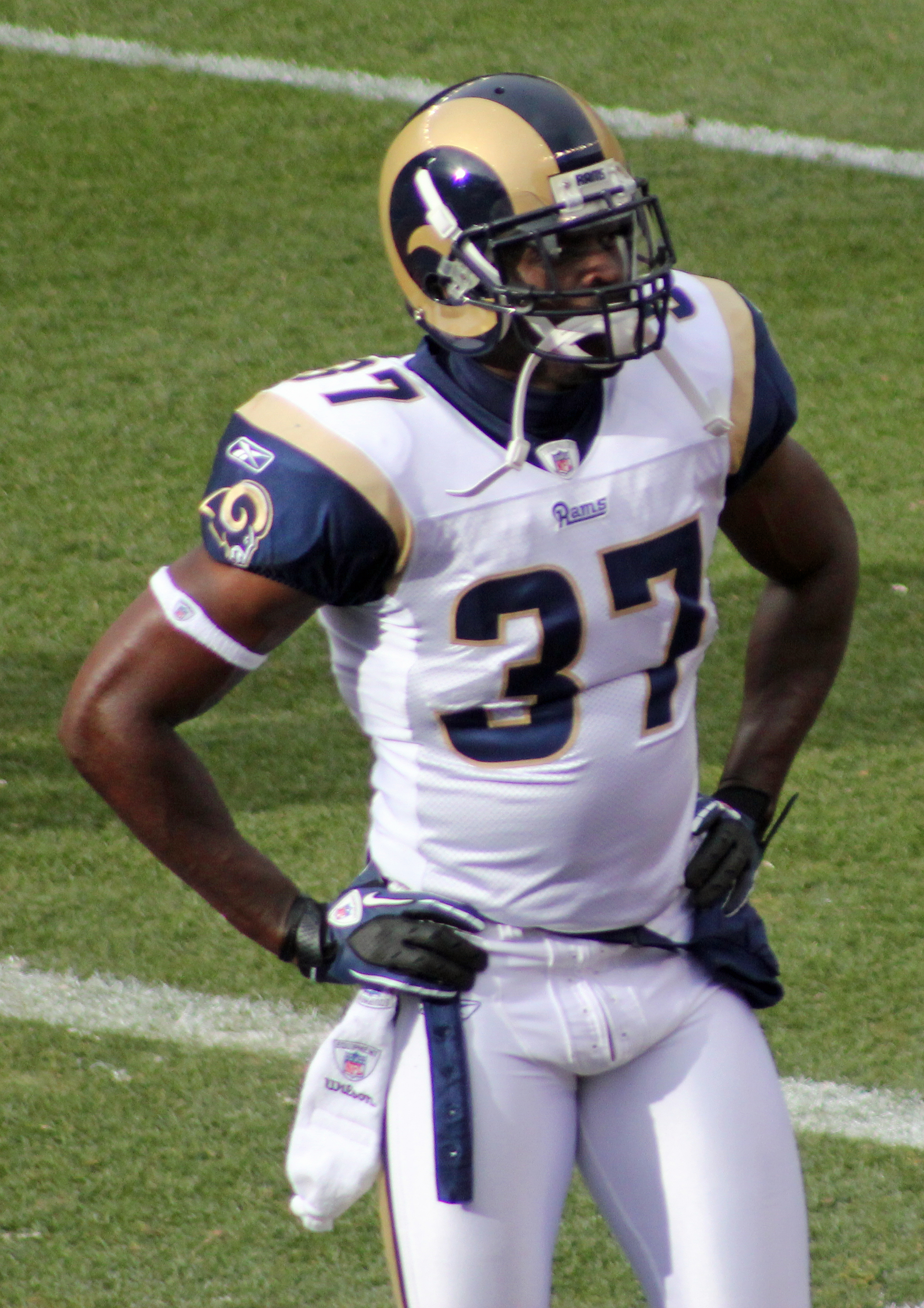
- Butler with the St. Louis Rams in 2010

No. 37
- Position: Safety

Personal information
- Born: September 7, 1982 (age 44); Climax, Georgia, U.S.
- Listed height: 6 ft 2 in (1.88 m)
- Listed weight: 218 lb (99 kg)

Career information
- High school: Bainbridge (Bainbridge, Georgia)
- College: Georgia Tech
- NFL draft: 2005: undrafted

Career history
- New York Giants (2005–2008); St. Louis Rams (2009–2011)

Awards and highlights
- Super Bowl champion (XLII); 2× First-team All-ACC (2003, 2004)

Career NFL statistics
- Total tackles: 291
- Forced fumbles: 1
- Fumble recoveries: 5
- Pass deflections: 32
- Interceptions: 11
- Stats at Pro Football Reference

James Oscar Butler Jr. (born September 7, 1982) is an American former professional football player who was a safety in the National Football League (NFL) for 7 seasons. He played college football for the Georgia Tech Yellow Jackets and was signed by the New York Giants as an undrafted free agent in 2005. Butler earned a Super Bowl ring with the Giants in Super Bowl XLII.

== Early life ==
Butler was a four-year letterman at Bainbridge High School in Bainbridge, Georgia, where he was the state champion in the triple jump as a sophomore. He was Class 5A honorable mention All-State selection as well as First-team All-Region and All-South Georgia. He had 69 tackles and two interceptions as a senior, following 54 tackles and four interceptions as a junior.

== College career ==
Butler was an American professional football player who was a free safety at Georgia Tech from 2001 to 2004. He was undrafted despite his highly decorated collegiate career. While at Georgia Tech, he majored in Building Construction. Butler, in four years, totaled 204 tackles, seven interceptions, ten pass breakups, four forced fumbles and blocked two field goals in his final two years as a starter at Georgia Tech, recorded 240 tackles in his career with the Yellow Jackets, was a semifinalist for the Jim Thorpe Award as the nation's top defensive back as a senior in 2004, when he was named First-team All-ACC for the second straight season, was second on the team with 85 tackles along with two interceptions, four pass breakups, a forced fumble and a blocked field goal, was also named to the ACC All-Academic team for the second straight year. The most notable performance of Butler's career was in 2004 when Georgia Tech's defense held Maryland to only 81 yards of total offense.

Butler was inducted into the Georgia Tech Sports Hall of Fame on October 11, 2014.

== Professional career ==
Pre-draft measurables
Height	Weight	Arm length	Hand span	40-yard dash	10-yard split	20-yard split	20-yard shuttle	Three-cone drill	Vertical jump	Broad jump	Bench press
6 ft 1 7/8 in (1.88 m)	213 lb (97 kg)	33 3/8 in (0.85 m)	9 in (0.23 m)	4.65 s	1.69 s	2.76 s	3.98 s	6.72 s	44.0 in (1.12 m)	10 ft 8 in (3.25 m)	16 reps
All values from NFL Combine/Pro Day

=== New York Giants ===
Butler saw action in 16 games during his rookie season in which he accumulated one start, plus the NFC Wild Card Game, tied for second on the team with 21 special teams tackles (19 solo). He recorded 18 tackles (14 solo), two interceptions, five passes defensed and one fumble recovery in play in dime packages. In 2006, Butler played in 14 regular season games with most of his action coming on special teams but he did see action in dime packages on defense and finished the season with 11 tackles (9 solo), 4 passes defensed and 12 special teams tackles. In Butler's third season (2007), the Giants defeated the New England Patriots in Super Bowl XLII. Butler led the Giants with ten total tackles in the game. In all Butler played in 13 regular season games with 12 starts and started all 4 postseason games at strong safety and finished with 69 tackles (38 solo), 1 interception, 6 passes defensed, and 1 fumble recovery. Butler, played in 15 games with a career-high 14 starts in 2008 and he had 76 tackles (45 solo) and three interceptions and six passes defensed.

=== St. Louis Rams ===
An unrestricted free agent in the 2009 offseason, Butler agreed to terms on a four-year $14 million contract, which could be worth almost $17 million if all incentives are met, with the St. Louis Rams on March 9. Butler who was good all-around safety for the Giants was particularly noted for his run support, "Butler is far stronger against the run than the pass and will be used as an "in the box" safety" for the Rams. The move reunited him with former Giants defensive coordinator and now former head coach of the Rams, Steve Spagnuolo.

== NFL career statistics ==
Legend
**Bold**	Career high

=== Regular season ===
Year	Team	Games		Tackles					Interceptions					Fumbles			
Year	Team	GP	GS	Cmb	Solo	Ast	Sck	TFL	Int	Yds	TD	Lng	PD	FF	FR	Yds	TD
2005	NYG	**16**	1	35	30	5	0.0	0	2	16	0	16	5	0	**1**	5	0
2006	NYG	14	0	27	24	3	0.0	0	0	0	0	0	4	0	0	0	0
2007	NYG	13	12	61	45	**16**	0.0	2	1	0	0	0	**7**	0	**1**	4	0
2008	NYG	15	**14**	68	54	14	0.0	**3**	**3**	**62**	0	**47**	**7**	0	**1**	0	0
2009	STL	13	13	**69**	**58**	11	0.0	1	**3**	17	0	17	6	0	**1**	10	0
2010	STL	14	4	20	18	2	0.0	1	2	13	0	16	3	**1**	**1**	**49**	0
2011	STL	**16**	0	11	10	1	0.0	0	0	0	0	0	0	0	0	0	0
		101	44	291	239	52	0.0	7	11	108	0	47	32	1	5	68	0

=== Playoffs ===
Year	Team	Games		Tackles					Interceptions					Fumbles			
Year	Team	GP	GS	Cmb	Solo	Ast	Sck	TFL	Int	Yds	TD	Lng	PD	FF	FR	Yds	TD
2005	NYG	1	0	1	1	0	0.0	0	0	0	0	0	0	0	0	0	0
2006	NYG	1	0	1	1	0	0.0	0	0	0	0	0	0	0	0	0	0
2007	NYG	**4**	**4**	**29**	**24**	**5**	0.0	**2**	0	0	0	0	**1**	0	0	0	0
2008	NYG	1	1	6	3	3	0.0	0	0	0	0	0	0	0	0	0	0
		7	5	37	29	8	0.0	2	0	0	0	0	1	0	0	0	0

== Personal life ==
He currently resides in Roswell, Georgia with his wife and children.

After the end of his NFL career, he finished the needed course requirements to receive a bachelor's degree in Building Construction from Georgia Tech on May 2, 2015.

Butler was charged with one count of conspiracy to commit wire fraud and health care fraud, one count of wire fraud, and one count of health care fraud by the United States Department of Justice on December 12, 2019. He initially pleaded not guilty to the charges, but changed his plea to guilty by July 2020. In October 2021, Butler was sentenced to two months in federal prison and 180 days of house arrest.
