= Bainbridge High School =

Bainbridge High School may refer to two high schools:

- Bainbridge High School (Georgia)
- Bainbridge High School (Washington)
