= Allen Mercantile Company =

Historic store in the US state of Georgia

- U.S. National Register of Historic Places
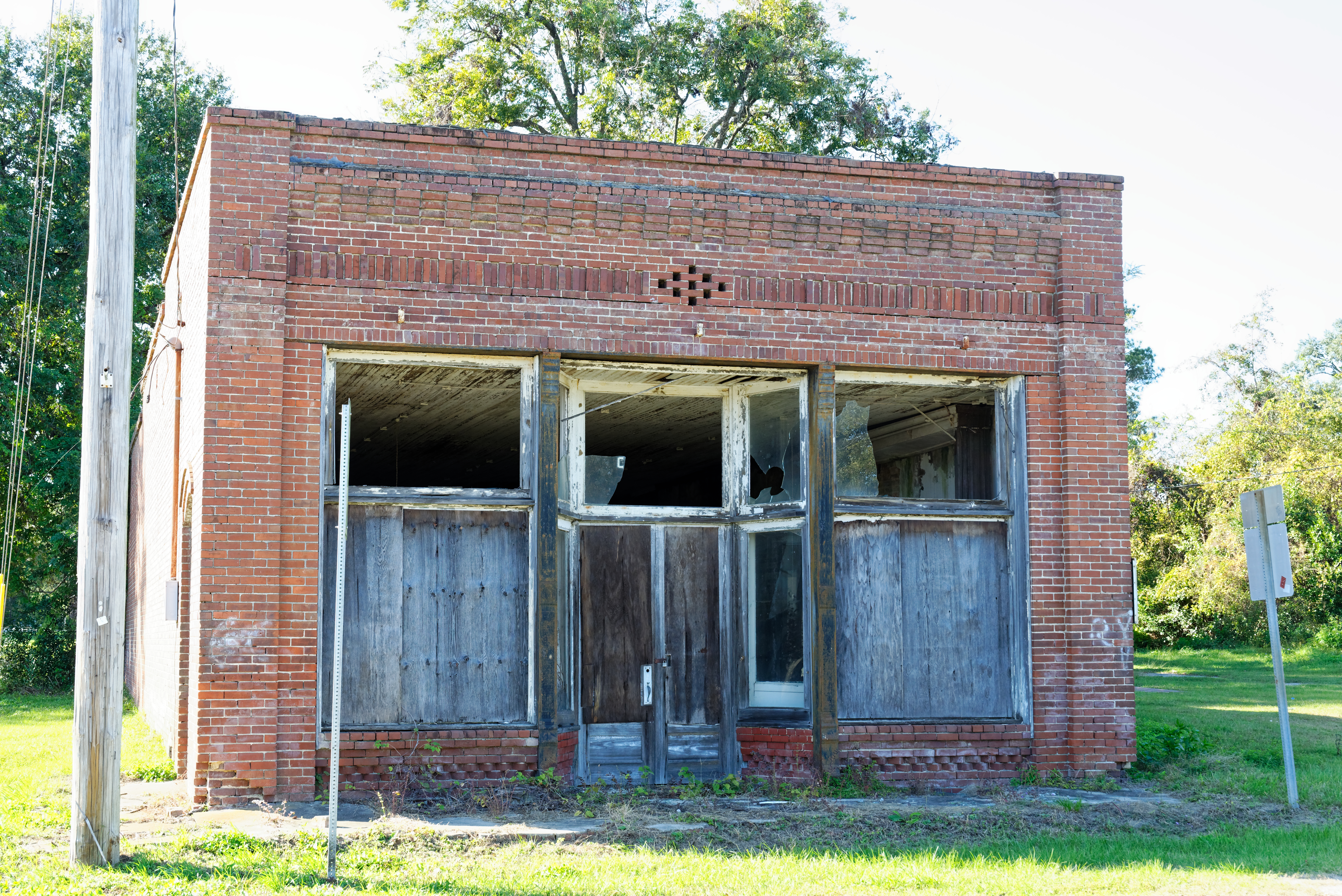
- Allen Mercantile Company building in 2020

- Location within Georgia
- Location: 102 Main St., Climax, Georgia
- Coordinates: 30.87548°N 84.43155°W
- Area: less than one acre
- Built: 1903
- Architectural style: Italianate
- NRHP reference No.: 02001632
- Added to NRHP: December 31, 2002

Allen Mercantile Company is a historic retail trade building at 102 Main Street in Climax, Georgia. It was added to the National Register of Historic Places in 2002. It was then one of only two surviving historic commercial buildings on Main Street.

The historic Department Store building was constructed in 1903 in a Victorian architecture and Italianate architecture style.

== See also ==
- National Register of Historic Places listings in Decatur County, Georgia
