= Samuel S. Talbert =

American academic and columnist

Samuel Stubbs Talbert
- Born: May 6, 1917; Brinson, Georgia, U.S.
- Died: April 25, 1972 (aged 54); Oxford, Mississippi, U.S.
- Resting place: Oxford Memorial Cemetery
- Education: University of Florida; Iowa State University
- Occupations: Academic, columnist
- Spouse: Frances Talbert
- Children: 1 son, 6 daughters

Samuel S. Talbert (May 6, 1917 - April 25, 1972) was an American academic and columnist. He was the chair of the Journalism Department at the University of Mississippi from 1951 to 1972, and his column was published in over 100 newspapers from 1957 to 1972. He was the author of three academic books on journalism and several plays.

== Early life ==
Samuel Stubbs Talbert was born on May 6, 1917, in Brinson, Georgia. He graduated from the University of Florida, where he earned a Bachelor of Arts degree followed by a master's degree. From 1941 to 1946, he served in the United States Navy Reserve. He earned a PhD from The University of Iowa in 1952.

== Career ==
Talbert joined the Journalism Department at the University of Mississippi as an assistant professor in 1948. He was the department chair from 1951 to 1972.

Talbert was the editor of The Mirror in Warm Springs, Georgia from 1936 to 1938. His column, Local Business, was published in over 100 newspapers from 1957 to 1972.

Talbert was the author of three academic books on journalism as well as several plays.

== Personal life and death ==
Talbert was married to Frances Selzer. They had a son and six daughters.

Talbert died of a heart attack on April 25, 1972, in Oxford, Mississippi. His funeral was held at the Oxford-University Methodist Church, and he was buried at the Oxford Memorial Cemetery.

== Selected works ==
- Talbert, Samuel S. (1948). Classified Advertising in the Weekly Newspaper. University, Mississippi: Academy Press. OCLC 18116229.
- Talbert, Samuel S. (1959). Case Studies of Local Advertising. University, Mississippi: Academy Press. OCLC 4659902.
- Talbert, Samuel S. (1962). Reaching Alumni. University, Mississippi: Academy Press. OCLC 988013566.
