= Brinson Family Historic District =

Historic district in Georgia, United States

- U.S. National Register of Historic Places
- U.S. Historic district
- Location within Georgia Location within the United States
- Location: Bainbridge, Wainhurst and Leon Sts., Brinson, Georgia
- Coordinates: 30.976389°N 84.736944°W
- Area: 14 acres (5.7 ha)
- NRHP reference No.: 86002677
- Added to NRHP: October 2, 1986

The Brinson Family Historic District in Brinson, Georgia, United States, is a 14-acre (5.7 ha) historic district that was listed on the National Register of Historic Places in 1986. It has six contributing buildings and two other contributing structures.

It includes the 1901-built Brinson Methodist Church, its parsonage, and four other houses, all associated with the Brinson family.

It includes the Homer Hodges Brinson House, the Simeon Brinson House, the O'Neal-Brinson House and the Brinson-Russell House.

The district is also notable for its landscape architecture, in particular "for the extensively and historically landscaped yards of the individual houses in the district and for its historic pecan grove and street trees."
