= Bainbridge Commercial Historic District =

Historic district in Georgia, United States

- U.S. National Register of Historic Places
- U.S. Historic district
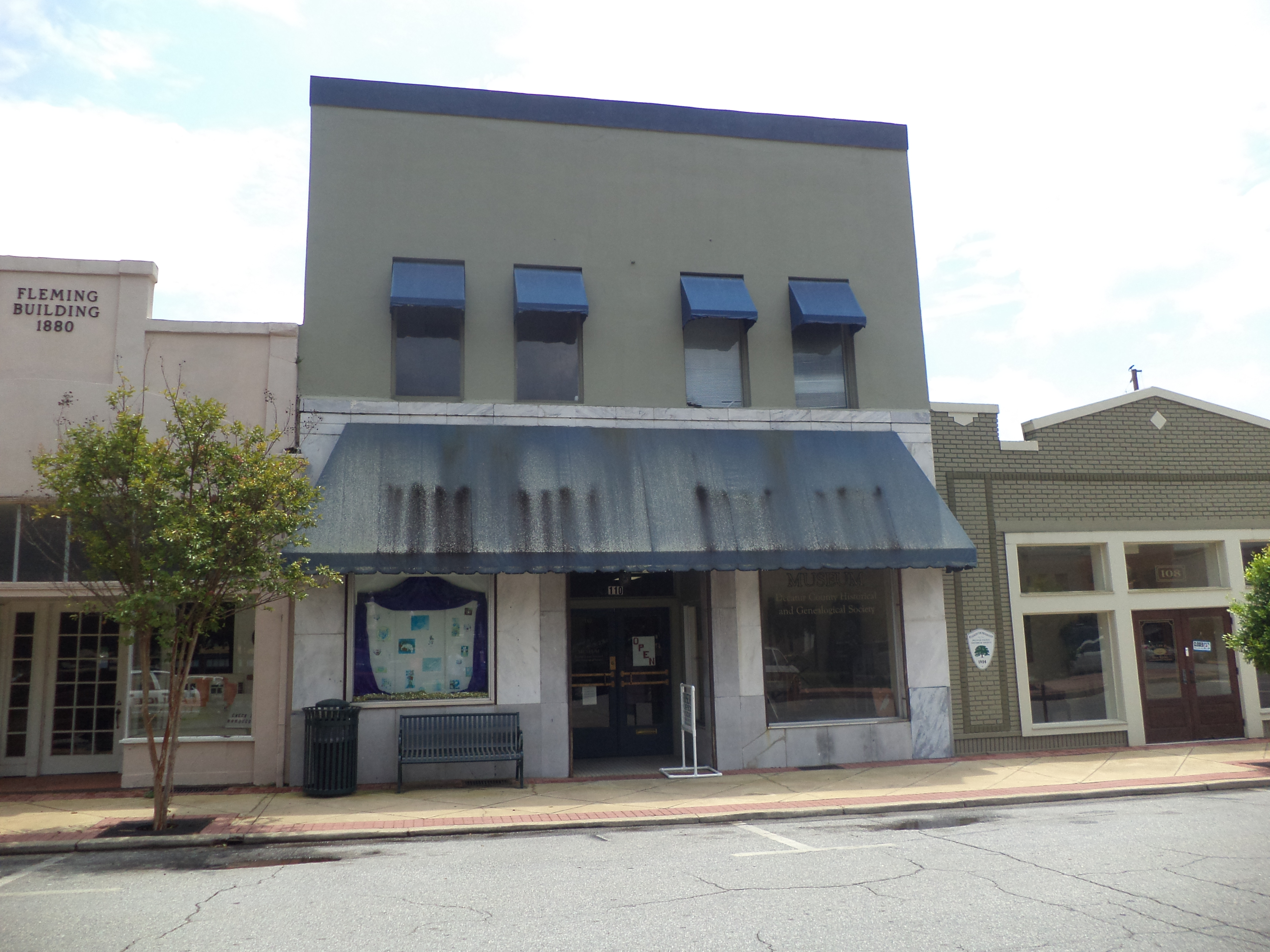
- Decatur County Historical and Genealogical Society on E. Broughton St.

- Location within Georgia Location within the United States
- Location: Roughly bounded by Water, Clark, Troupe, West, Broughton, & Crawford Sts., Bainbridge, Georgia
- Coordinates: 30°54′21″N 84°34′32″W
- Area: 10 acres (4.0 ha)
- Built: 1824
- Architect: Multiple
- Architectural style: Late 19th And 20th Century Revivals, Italianate
- NRHP reference No.: 87001908
- Added to NRHP: November 6, 1987

The Bainbridge Commercial Historic District is a historic district comprising the downtown business area of Bainbridge, Georgia. It includes Bainbridge's original courthouse square, now Willis Park, and 56 contributing buildings in a 10-acre (4.0 ha) area roughly bounded by Water, Clark, Troupe, West, Broughton, & Crawford streets. The district was added to the National Register of Historic Places in 1987.

In 1987, the district had 56 contributing buildings and one contributing site (Willis Park), plus 24 non-contributing buildings.

== See also ==
- Bainbridge Residential Historic District, to the south and east
