= Bainbridge High School (Georgia) =

Public high school in Bainbridge, Georgia, United States

Coordinates: 30.89765°N 84.55764°W

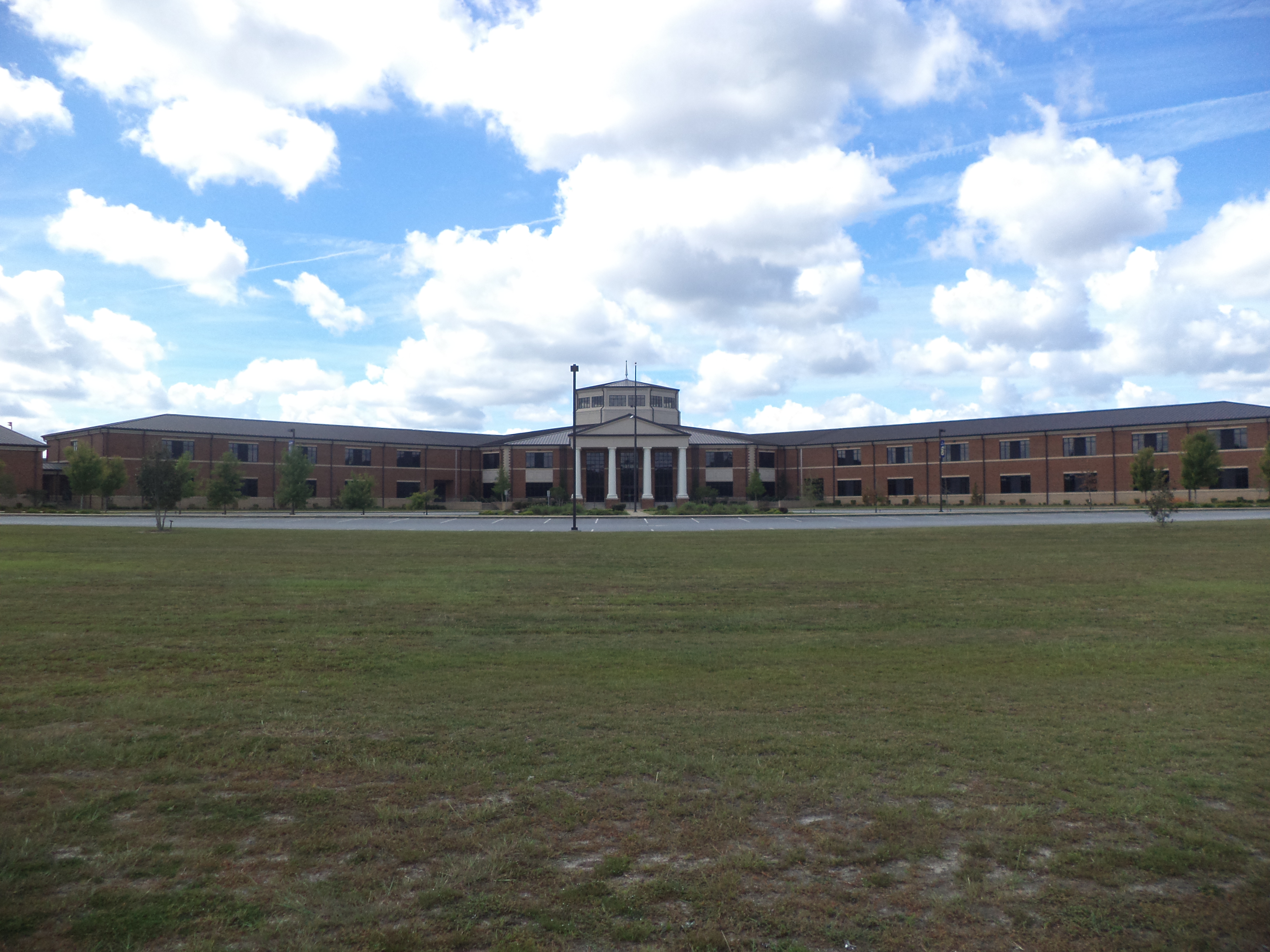

Location
- One Bearcat Boulevard; Bainbridge, Georgia 39819; United States

Information
- Type: Public high school
- School district: Decatur County School District
- Principal: Chris Bryant
- Teaching staff: 85.90 (FTE)
- Grades: 9–12
- Enrollment: 1,218 (2023–2024)
- Student to teacher ratio: 14.18
- Colors: Purple and gold
- Athletics: Baseball, basketball, cheerleading, cross country, football, golf, soccer, softball, swim team, tennis, track and field, wrestling
- Mascot: Bearcat
- Rival schools: Cairo High School; Miller County High School; Mitchell County High School; Pelham High School; Seminole County High School; Thomas County Central High School; Warner Robins High School
- Website: https://bhs.dcboe.com/o/bhs

Bainbridge High School is a public high school located in Bainbridge, Georgia, United States. The school is part of the Decatur County School District, which serves Decatur County.

== History ==
When education first started in the town, there were two buildings, a grammar school and high school. The grammar school building was constructed in 1913 by Wm. A. Edwards of Atlanta. The high school building was erected in 1922 by G. Lloyd Preacher of Atlanta.

The school's curriculum includes the following departments: mathematics, science, languages, history, English, home economics, commercial, and diversified occupations. Extracurricular activities include athletics, band, glee club, piano, spoken English, 4-H Club, Beta Club, Tri-Hi-Y, and Hi Y.

In August 2009, students from Decatur County went to a new high school located on Highway 84. The old high school is now home for Bainbridge Middle School (grades 7-8), while Hutto Middle School holds grades 5-6 while Potter Street, Elcan King, Jones Wheat, John Johnson, and West Bainbridge Elementary hold PK-4. I

n 2021 to the current year, the grade system of Decatur County School District also made a revamp. Now, Hutto Middle School is now an elementary school, holding grades 3-5, and Bainbridge Middle School is now in align with other Georgia middle schools as it now holds 6-8. In 2021, Elcan King Elementary had been closed. John Johnson Elementary School is now Bainbridge Public Safety Training Center, Potter Street Elementary School is now New Beginnings Learning Center and Elcan King Elementary School has been demolished for a parking lot.

The only running elementary and primary schools in the county currently are Jones Wheat Primary School, West Bainbridge Primary School and Hutto Elementary School. West Bainbridge Primary School was an elementary school, holding grades PK-4 until the change which turned them into a primary school, now currently only holding the grades of Pre-k to 2nd grade. There is also one new charter high school, even though in the past Bainbridge High School and Grace Christian Academy were the only high schools.

== Notable alumni ==
- James Butler - professional football player
- Cathy Cox - former Georgia Secretary of State, former president of Young Harris College, and Dean of Mercer University Law School and current president of Georgia College & State University
- Paul Kwilecki - American documentary photographer
- Jason Lancaster - vocalist for Go Radio
- Dameon Pierce - professional football player
- Brian Powell - former professional baseball player
- Ken Rice - former professional football player
- Ernest Riles - former Major League Baseball player
- Kirby Smart - head football coach of the University of Georgia Bulldogs

== State Titles ==
- Football (2) - 1982(3A), 2018(5A)
- Boys' Golf (1) - 1968(2A)
- Boys' Track (1) - 2010(4A)

=== Other GHSA State Titles ===
- Literary (1) - 1951(A)
