= Bainbridge Residential Historic District =

Historic district in Georgia, United States

- U.S. National Register of Historic Places
- U.S. Historic district
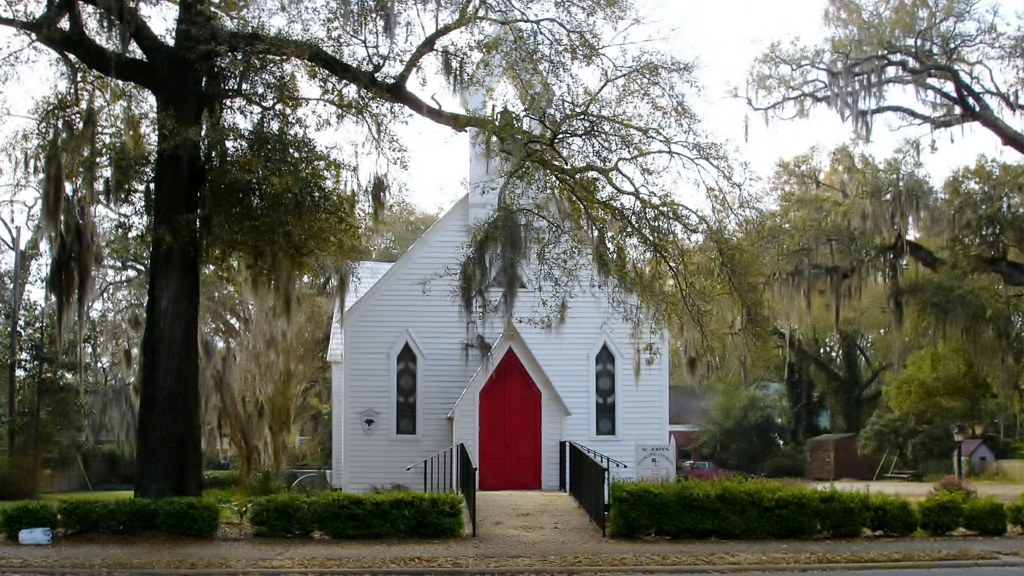
- St. John's Episcopal Church, in the district

- Location within Georgia Location within the United States
- Location: Roughly bounded by Calhoun, Scott, Evans, College, & Washington Sts., Bainbridge, Georgia
- Coordinates: 30.903889°N 84.573889°W
- Area: 125 acres (51 ha)
- Architect: Multiple
- Architectural style: Late 19th and 20th Century Revivals, Late 19th and Early 20th Century American Movements, Late Victorian
- NRHP reference No.: 87001907
- Added to NRHP: November 5, 1987

The Bainbridge Residential Historic District in Bainbridge, Georgia is an irregularly shaped 125 acres (51 ha) historic district that was listed on the National Register of Historic Places in 1987. It then had 197 contributing buildings and 76 non-contributing ones. The overall plan of the neighborhood was also deemed to be a contributing resource.

The district encompasses the largest and only intact historic neighborhood in Bainbridge. It includes houses of numerous 19th-and early 20th-century house styles and sizes.

Two antebellum houses, both built around 1850, are included in the district:

- the Farrar House at 501 East Evans Street, a two-story simplified Greek Revival style house, with a monumental two-story entry porch, and
- the Barrel House at 627 East Planter Street, a one-story house with square pillars and pilasters on its inset front verandah.

Most houses in the area were built between 1880 and 1930, in subdivisions that merged.

The NRHP nomination notes that "One of the architecturally interesting streets in the southwest section of the district is Washington Street, which contains a large collection of pyramidal roofed houses. These one-story frame structures are dominated by their seemingly oversized roofs, with ornamentation limited to turned columns on the front porches. This house type can also be found in the northeast part of the district, on Georgia Avenue, historically a black neighborhood."
