= T. M. Callahan House =

- U.S. National Register of Historic Places
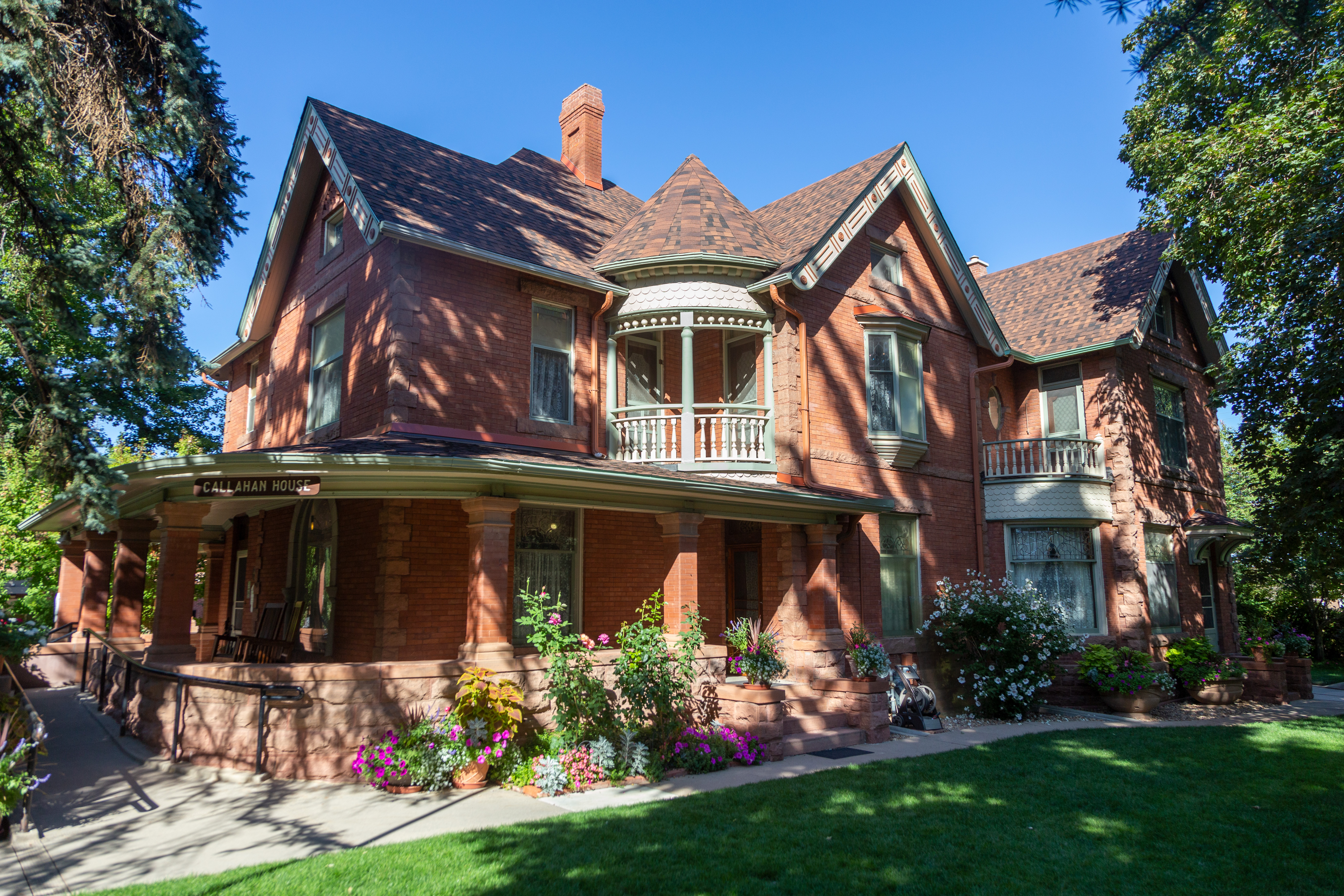

- Location within Colorado
- Location: 312 Terry St., Longmont, Colorado
- Coordinates: 40.16450°N 105.10481°W
- Area: 0.6 acres (0.24 ha)
- Built: 1892, 1897, 1908
- Built by: James Wiggins
- Architectural style: Queen Anne
- NRHP reference No.: 85001064
- Added to NRHP: May 16, 1985

The T. M. Callahan House, also known as the ‘’’Sweeny-Callahan House’’’, at 312 Terry St. in Longmont, Colorado, is a large Queen Anne-style house built in 1892 and expanded in 1897 and 1908. It was listed on the National Register of Historic Places in 1985.

It is now an event venue known as the Callahan House & Garden.

It has served as a Women's club building.

Its foundation is red Lyons sandstone.

The original builder in 1892 was James Wiggins. Its interior was extensively renovated by interior designers Mitchel & Halback in 1908.

The house's original construction and 1908 renovation created "many outstanding decorative features...as well as beautifully landscaped grounds."

It was deemed significant as "one of Longmont's most distinguished houses" and for its association with James Koller Sweeny, its first owner and a banker and flour mill manager. Its association with Thomas M. Callahan, founder of Golden Rule Stores is more significant however. Callahan lived in and had an office in the house from 1897 until 1938. A younger partner of Callahan, eventually, was James Cash Penney, who learned from Callahan and from Guy Johnson and went on to buy them out of their stores in Wyoming and to establish the J.C. Penney Company.”

“Soon after Callahan bought the Sweeny house, he began to make improvements. He added hot water heat and a four-room, two-story addition on the south rear of the house where he located his office on the first floor.”

“The house's wraparound porch and porte cochere were added in 1904; the interior was redesigned in 1908, and its grounds were expanded by purchase of adjacent land, allowing for extensive landscaping.”

"During his years in Longmont, Callahan was very active in local civic affairs and fraternal organizations. He served as an officer and/or director of several local banks and was involved in the formation of the Arbuckle Ditch Company, which remains an important water source for Longmont and the surrounding farm community. 6 In 1938 Callahan and his wife moved to Reno, Nevada, at which time they donated their house to the city of Longmont for exclusive use by women f s groups and clubs for meetings and special events. The Mutual Improvement Club, founded in 1892 as one of Longmont f s first social clubs, holds meetings in the house. Men are seldom allowed in the house and alcohol is prohibited according to the stipulations of Callahan’s gift. The house is managed by a private board with the grounds maintained by the city."

A second contributing building on the property is a one and a half story red brick carriage house. In 1984 it was being renovated to serve as offices for the St. Vrain Historical Society.

It was designated a Longmont local landmark.
