= First African Missionary Baptist Church =

Historic church in Georgia, United States

- U.S. National Register of Historic Places
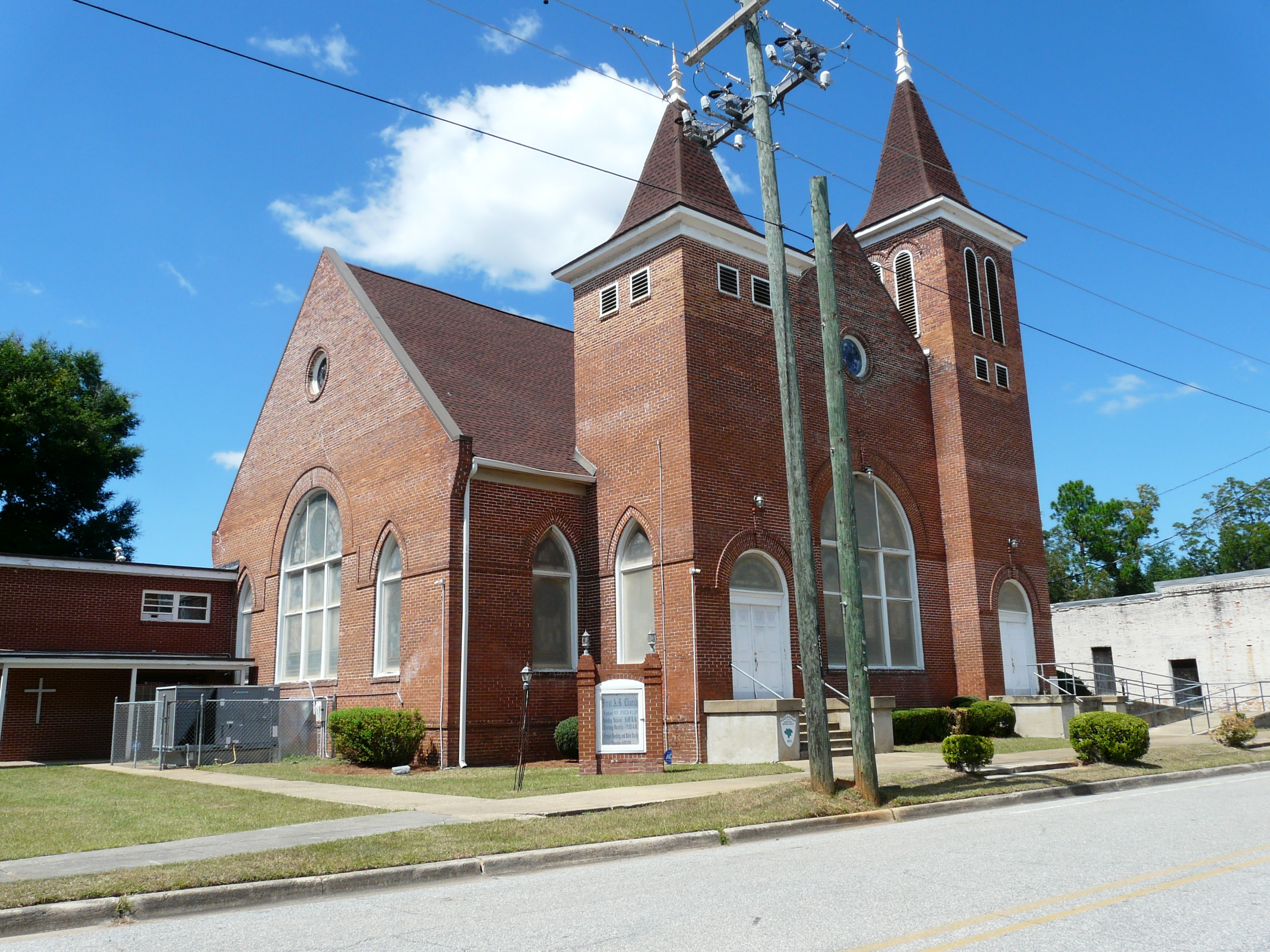

- Location within Georgia Location within the United States
- Location: 515 Webster St., Bainbridge, Georgia
- Coordinates: 30°54′15″N 84°34′29″W
- Area: 0.3 acres (0.12 ha)
- Built: 1904-1909
- Architect: Thomas H. Bynes
- Architectural style: Romanesque
- NRHP reference No.: 01001535
- Added to NRHP: January 28, 2002

The First African Missionary Baptist Church in Bainbridge, Georgia, is a Romanesque Revival-style church built during 1904–1909. It was listed on the National Register of Historic Places in 2002.

It is a brick church. It was designed by Thomas H. Bynes, a member of the congregation who was a graduate of Tuskegee Institute, and is unusual as an "outstanding example of African-American church architecture in Georgia at the beginning of the 20th century", at a time when most churches founded and built by blacks were usually "plain, one-room frame structures, rectangular in shape with gable roofs" with "little or no ornamentation or architectural detailing."

The interior has 12 curved rows of pews arranged in a semi-circle.
