= J. W. Callahan House =

Historic house in Georgia, United States

- U.S. National Register of Historic Places
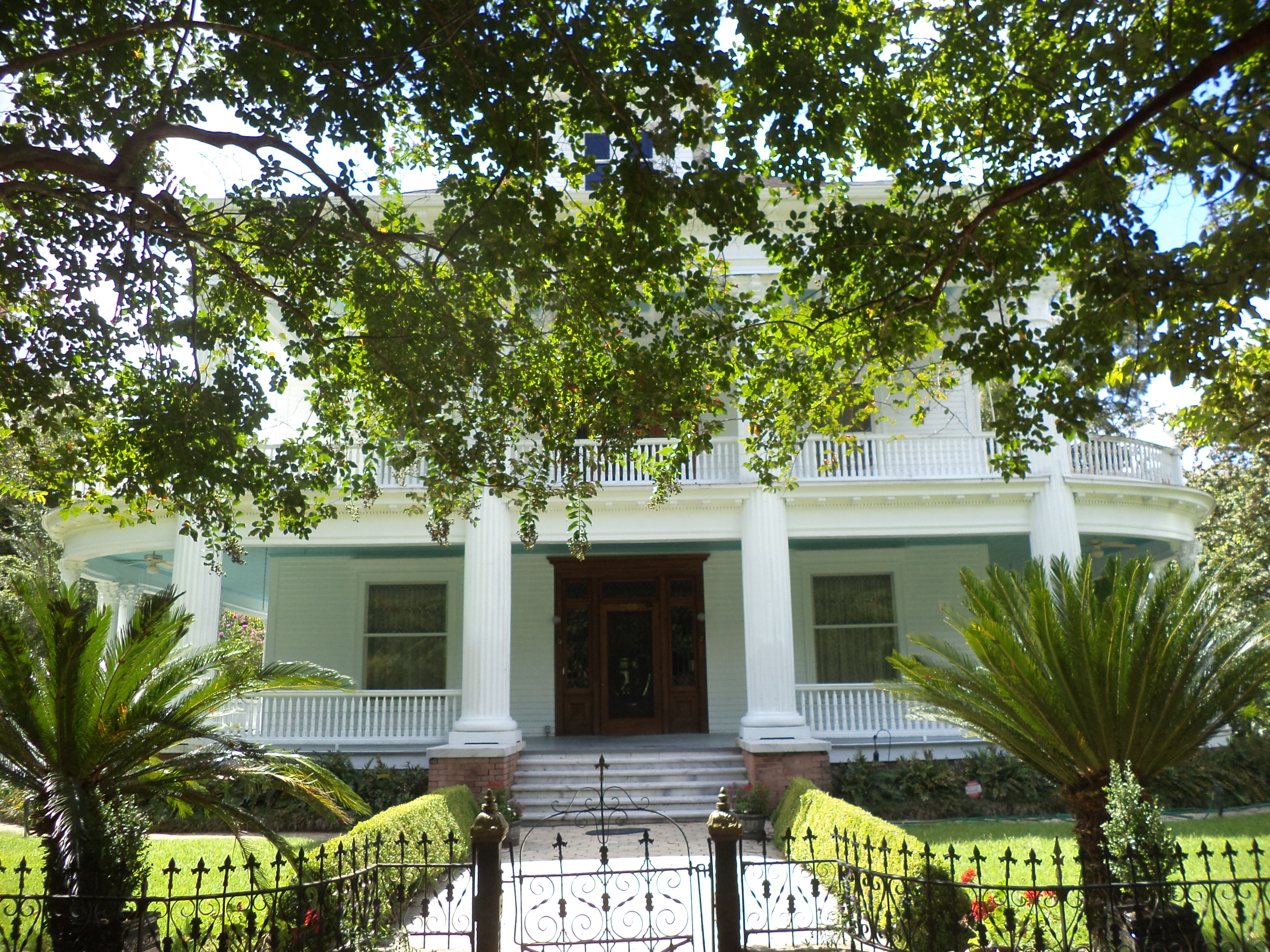

- Location within Georgia Location within the United States
- Location: 200 Evans St., Bainbridge, Georgia
- Coordinates: 30.90182°N 84.57547°W
- Area: 2 acres (0.81 ha)
- Built: c.1907
- Architectural style: Classical Revival
- NRHP reference No.: 76000616
- Added to NRHP: December 12, 1976

The J. W. Callahan House is a Classical Revival-style house in Bainbridge, Georgia that was built in c. 1907. It was listed on the National Register of Historic Places in 1976.

It was home of John Wesley Callahan, steamship businessman. It is a two-and-a-half-story house with a dormered hipped roof supported by a monumental portico with four Corinthian columns. It has a curved one-story porch around three sides of the house.
