= John L. Callahan House =

Historic house in Wisconsin, United States

- U.S. National Register of Historic Places
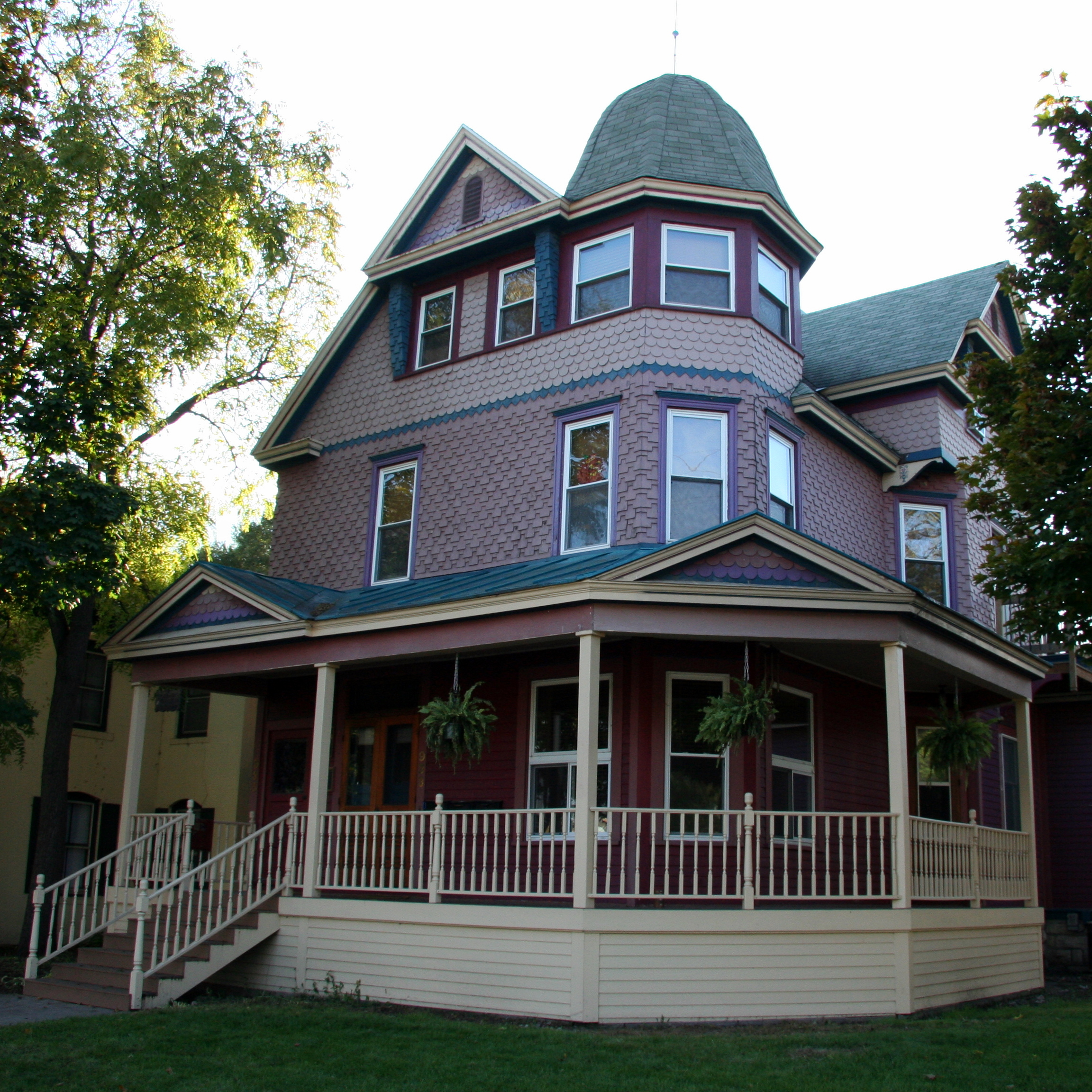
- John L. Callahan House
- Location: 933 Rose St., La Crosse, Wisconsin
- Coordinates: 43°50′16″N 91°14′54″W
- Area: less than one acre
- Built: 1894
- Architect: Gustav Stoltze/Hugh Schick
- Architectural style: Queen Anne
- NRHP reference No.: 95000406
- Added to NRHP: April 14, 1995

The John L. Callahan House is located in La Crosse, Wisconsin.

== History ==
John L. Callahan was a physician and a local health official. Callahan used the house as his residence and his office. Later, it was used as a funeral parlor before being converted into apartments. It was added to the State and the National Register of Historic Places in 1995.
