= Paul Kwilecki =

American photographer (1928–2009)

Paul Kwilecki (1928–2009) was an American documentary photographer.

== Biography ==
Paul's grandfather, Isadore Kwilecki, came to the United States from Prussia in 1866. Settling in Bainbridge, he opened a hardware store handed down in the family until Paul sold it in 1975 to devote himself full-time to photography. The Kwileckis were prominent in business and civic affairs. Julian Kwilecki, Paul's father, served two terms as mayor of Bainbridge.

Paul Kwilecki lived in Bainbridge for the entirety his life with the exception of four years of college and graduate school at Emory University in Atlanta. He majored in literature. Returning to Bainbridge in 1950, he took his place behind the counter in the hardware store. In 1952, Kwilecki married Charlotte Williford from nearby Camilla, Georgia. They had four children - Paul Jr., Susan, Frances, and Elizabeth.

Kwilecki's interest in photography began at age eight, when he received a developing kit as a birthday gift. As a teenager, his acquaintance with images on film expanded as he served as photographer for his high school yearbook and worked as a projectionist in Bainbridge's movie theatre. In college, he and a friend published in Life magazine a picture they made of Kappa Alpha Order fraternity members dressed in Confederate regalia.

When Kwilecki married and began to have children, he put photography aside temporarily, taking it up again in the 1960s. He had no formal training and to compensate, wrote to photographers and museum curators across the United States for help and guidance. In particular, he developed a lasting relationship with New York City photographer David Vestal, who reviewed and commented upon photographs Kwilecki sent him.

Over several decades, Kwilecki formulated and executed the project of documenting life in Bainbridge, Georgia. Eventually, the value of his work was recognized outside of Decatur County. In black and white photographs, and writings about the subjects of the pictures, Paul Kwilecki documented life in the small town of Bainbridge in Decatur County, Georgia. Surrounded by farms, swamps, and forests, Bainbridge lies in the southwest corner of Georgia. When Kwilecki made his pictures, Decatur County had a population of around 23,000 people, 41% of whom were African-American.

In 1979, he received a grant from the National Endowment for the Arts, and in 1981 became a John Simon Guggenheim Fellow. Kwilecki has photographs in the permanent collections of the Museum of Modern Art in New York City and the High Museum in Atlanta. His pictures have been exhibited in Europe (Museum of Palazzo Venetia and Les Rencontres D’Arles); in New York City (O.K. Harris and Robert Freidus galleries); in Washington, D. C. (Corcoran Gallery); on the West coast (The Friends of Photography in Carmel and San Francisco Camerawork); and in Southern venues such as the New Orleans Museum of Art.

Kwilecki's work has been published in Time-Life's Photography Yearbook, Time-Life's Documentary Photography, Popular Photography, Camera Arts, Brown’s Guide to Georgia, Latent Image 2, Aperture #115, San Francisco Camerawork Quarterly, American Land Forum, U.S. Camera Annual, The Southern Quarterly, The Atlanta Constitution, and The Encyclopedia of Southern Culture. Kwilecki addressed photography teachers and students at Duke University, La Grange College, Lehigh University, University of Missouri at Columbia, Georgia State University, and the Society of Photographic Educators.

Kwilecki's work additionally has been published in three books: Understandings: Photographs of Decatur County (University of North Carolina Press, 1981), Lowly Wise: Book One, Scenes of Religion in Decatur County, Georgia (self-published in 1992), and One Place: Paul Kwilecki and Four Decades of Photographs from Decatur County, Georgia (Center for Documentary Studies, Duke University, 2013).

One Place, edited by Tom Rankin, features over 200 images, along with corresponding texts. In a review for Garden and Gun, Clyde E. Edgerton called it “one of the best and most important books to come from the South,” adding, “now on my shelf beside Faulkner, Welty, and O’Connor.” Roger Hodge, editor-in-chief of Oxford American Magazine, called One Place “a masterpiece of documentary art.”

== Work ==
Kwilecki took pains to distinguish his project from art photography. “I’m not trying to make aesthetic images,” he said in an interview in 1994. “I’m not in it as an artist. . . . I’m interested in what is going on here.” Photographing the inhabitants of Bainbridge, he was plumbing the human heart. He worked on the premise that, as he put it, “the acute need for a few basic human necessities—love, fulfillment, understanding, for example—is what drives civilization and is the same the world over. It is determined by the nature of our minds, not where we live.” According to Kwilecki, the people of Decatur County, Georgia represented this fundamental human nature as vitally and completely as the inhabitants of New York City, Paris, or Tokyo. As he put it in a 2001 talk at Duke University: “Insight into a life in Decatur County is insight into lives everywhere.”

Kwilecki grouped his pictures in thematic series, each portraying an enduring feature of life in Bainbridge—and elsewhere—such as religion, the court house, shoppers, workers, and the cemetery. The series offered the southwest Georgia version of cross-cultural facets of social life. The court house series, for example, contains images of a jail cell, a jury room, individuals nervously waiting in hallways, a sheriff, a bathroom, and prisoners eating a Thanksgiving meal. It conveys the tension, universal in societies, between the individual and collective authority. “The [courthouse building’s] institutional coldness and its clumsy hulking that dwarfs the human figure, strike at the vulnerability of people, producing an atmosphere of estrangement that can be read on the faces of all who go there,” wrote Kwilecki. “The courthouse is where one may enter a free man and exit a prisoner. The collective will of society . . . can fall like a sledgehammer.”

Across the series, Kwilecki repeatedly articulated two universals. The first is that any human endeavor is inherently complex, ambiguous, and self-contradictory. The second is that time destroys whatever humans create.

The Junior-Senior prom series, depicting a local rite of passage, illustrates the complexity theme, specifically that “negative reactions,” as Kwilecki noted in a talk, “coexist with positive ones.” The pictures show a ceremonial promenade of couples through the park on the afternoon of the dance. In multiple images, the high school students and their mothers appear anxious, a surprising emotion on a supposedly festive occasion. “Smiles are taught and talk spastic,” Kwilecki described the girls in evening gowns. “A few mothers have gone from excitement to panic. . . . The pressure that builds from family and spectators is crushing.” Headed towards the dance, couples pose in their finery before a memorial in the park honoring local young men killed in overseas battles. “They seem blind to the intersection,” Kwilecki observed.

Photographs of a night baptism in an African-American church yard convey the incongruence between physical reality and religious meaning. Two pictures show the pastor, dressed in white, executing the dramatic ritual gestures through which Christians imitate the Savior and move towards God. A third image contains the empty baptismal tank. “No one noticed,” Kwilecki commented, “that their vessel of salvation was a rectangle of mildewed concrete blocks surrounded by weeds and lit by a single bulb.”

The photographs in some series were made over several decades. Thus Kwilecki depicts the passage of time. Natasha Trethewey, U.S. Poet Laureate, writes, “Mostly, Paul Kwilecki's words and images are about time, what lasts, what doesn't. Here, we find Kwilecki's fellow sojourners in time, and Decatur County: black and white, young and old, workers and storeowners and shoppers, preachers and prisoners. People inhabiting the place they share--the place they began, the place they will end.”

Kwilecki photographed the destruction of a bridge across the Flint River and the new bridge that replaced it. The cemetery series includes multiple images of a statue of an angel positioned on a child's grave. Kwilecki photographed the angel repeatedly over time, producing images of it covered with lichen, covered with snow, bleached clean, and broken into pieces by vandals.

The Battles’ Quarters series documents, in Kwilecki's words, “the worst slum in town.” Decrepit houses were rented to African-Americans “too broke to live elsewhere.” It was “a dead end.” The pictures portray vibrant inhabitants living in squalor. “Finally Battles’ Quarters got condemned and was demolished,” Kwilecki wrote. “Now there is a dirt street, no houses, ending under an expressway exit. It is as if the place imploded. The weeds and wildflowers growing there give no indication that it ever existed.”

Kwilecki did not present himself as an impartial observer of life in Bainbridge. “Mine is an egocentric document,” he said, “making no claim to comprehensiveness or objectivity... I photograph subjects who are, to me, vivid and substantial. I leave everything else alone.”

One bias was his greater sympathy for the poorer inhabitants of Bainbridge than the wealthier. In Kwilecki's work as a whole, prosperous citizens barely figure except as store owners or shoppers. Some pictures feature whites from the lower end of the socio-economic spectrum. However, images abound of indigent African-Americans, who, when he began his work in the 1960s, were destined to social humiliation and bare subsistence. There are qualitative differences in how he portrayed his well-off subjects as opposed to their deprived counterparts.

In Lowly Wise, Kwilecki contrasted the God represented by St. Peter's in Rome with the God suggested by the rural black churches he photographed. He characterized the former deity as “vain, ostentatious, and bombastic,” and the latter as “a no-nonsense father who loves all his children unconditionally.” Although a non-believer himself, Kwilecki used spiritual metaphors to describe the day he photographed Mt. Horum, an abandoned African-American church. The church interior, he wrote, was bathed in light. “It was as if God in his radiance stood in the church yard... This was God’s house and we had found him at home.” Kwilecki's images of Mt. Horum stand in sharp contrast to his only picture of Bainbridge's First Baptist Church, a large brick structure with columns patronized by respectable white citizens. Kwilecki shows First Baptist under cloudy sky, upstaged by a parking lot full of bulky cars.

Rankin offers multiple causes for the affluent Kwilecki's identification with the poor. It could reflect respect for the tradition in documentary photography of focusing on the lower classes. In addition, Kwilecki may have felt personally alienated from his well-to-do peers and expressed it with his camera.

Kwilecki himself explained his bias as an emotional response to his subjects. “Always,” he wrote of his photographs, “the essential element was feeling.” He considered the poverty-stricken blacks of the Battles’ Quarters and shade tobacco series to be “people of enormous vitality and durability.” Of the shade tobacco workers, he commented, “There’s a poise and beauty about them.” He also noted their “world-weariness, frustration that race made them consumable and therefore expendable.” Still, with zeal, humor, and stamina, they endured “days of back-breaking work and nights of despair in the subtropical, intensely prejudiced south Georgia atmosphere.” “The message in my work,” he commented in an interview, ”is compassion.”
