= Brinson, Georgia =

- Town
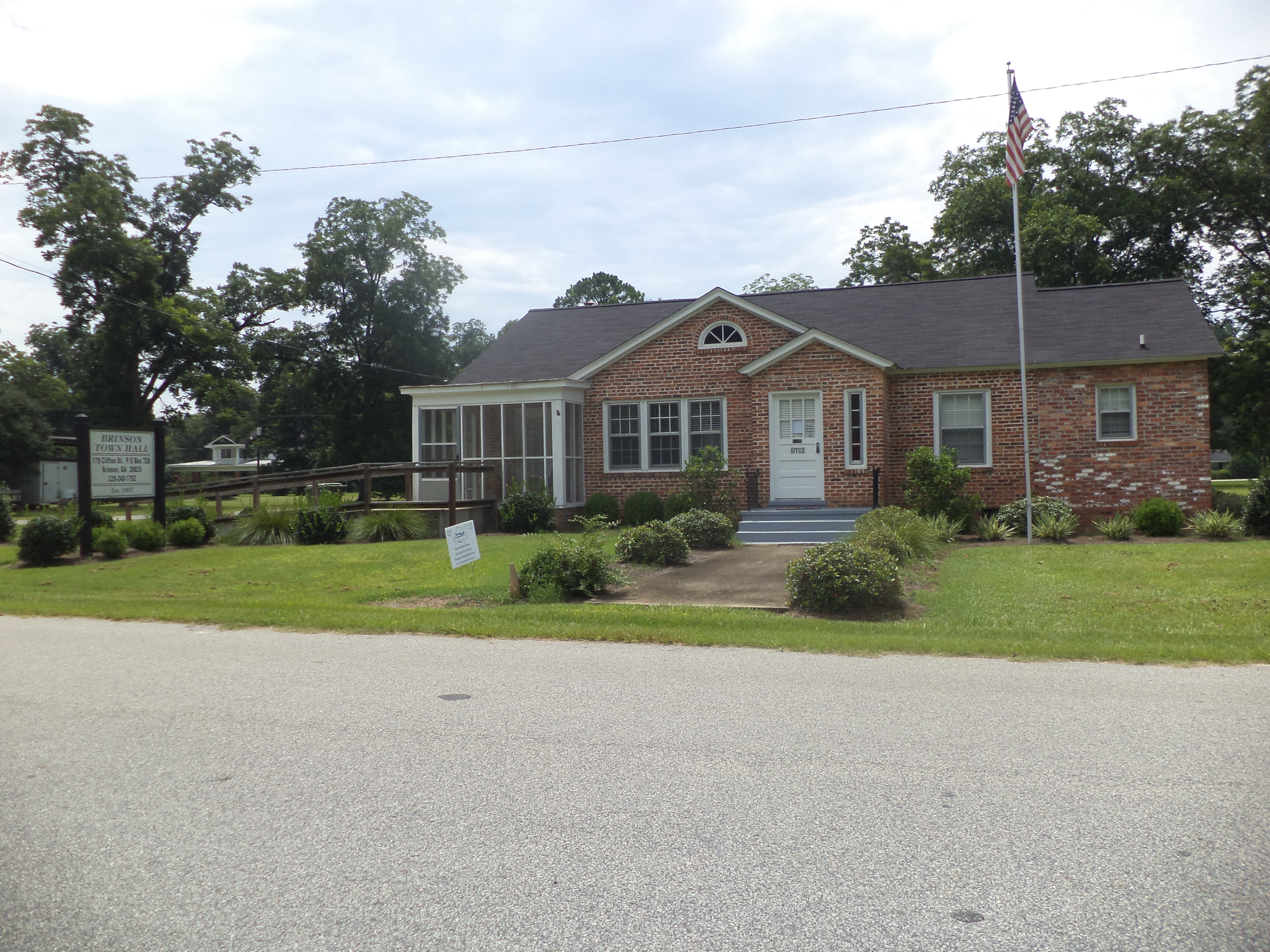
- Brinson Town Hall

- Location in Decatur County and the state of Georgia
- Coordinates: 30°58′45″N 84°44′10″W
- Country: United States
- State: Georgia
- County: Decatur

Area
  - Total: 2.04 sq mi (5.29 km^{2})
  - Land: 2.04 sq mi (5.29 km^{2})
  - Water: 0 sq mi (0.00 km^{2})
- Elevation: 121 ft (37 m)

Population (2020)
  - Total: 217
  - Density: 106.3/sq mi (41.05/km^{2})
- Time zone: UTC-5 (Eastern (EST))
  - Summer (DST): UTC-4 (EDT)
- ZIP codes: 31725, 39825
- Area code: 229
- FIPS code: 13-10608
- GNIS feature ID: 0354857
- Website: georgiainfo.galileo.usg.edu/topics/historical_markers/county/decatur/brinson-side-1

Brinson is a town in Decatur County, Georgia, United States. As of the 2020 census, the city had a population of 217, up from 215 at the 2010 census. It is part of the Bainbridge, Georgia Micropolitan Statistical Area.

== History ==
Variant names were "Mount Zion and "Spring Creek. Simeon Brinson, an early postmaster and first mayor, gave the town its present name. The Georgia General Assembly incorporated the place as the "Town of Brinson" in 1907.

Agriculture predominates in the area. According to one compilation, three of the top ten recipients of U.S. farm subsidies are in Brinson.

== Geography ==
Brinson is located in northwestern Decatur County at 30°58′45″N 84°44′10″W (30.979029, −84.736059). U.S. Route 84 passes through the southwest side of the town, leading southeast 10 miles (16 km) to Bainbridge, the Decatur County seat, and northwest 44 miles to Dothan, Alabama.

According to the United States Census Bureau, Brinson has a total area of 2.0 square miles (5.3 km^{2}), all land.

== Demographics ==
Historical population
| Census | Pop. | Note | %± |
|---|---|---|---|
| 1910 | 707 | | — |
| 1920 | 470 | | −33.5% |
| 1930 | 368 | | −21.7% |
| 1940 | 305 | | −17.1% |
| 1950 | 248 | | −18.7% |
| 1960 | 246 | | −0.8% |
| 1970 | 231 | | −6.1% |
| 1980 | 274 | | 18.6% |
| 1990 | 238 | | −13.1% |
| 2000 | 225 | | −5.5% |
| 2010 | 215 | | −4.4% |
| 2020 | 217 | | 0.9% |
U.S. Decennial Census; 1850-1870 1870-1880; 1890-1910 1920-1930; 1940 1950 1960; 1970 1980 1990; 2000 2010

At the 2000 census, there were 225 people, 90 households and 63 families residing in the town. By 2020, its population was 217.

== Notable people ==
- Samuel S. Talbert (1917–1972) - academic and columnist
