= Climax, Georgia =

City in Decatur County, Georgia, USA

- City
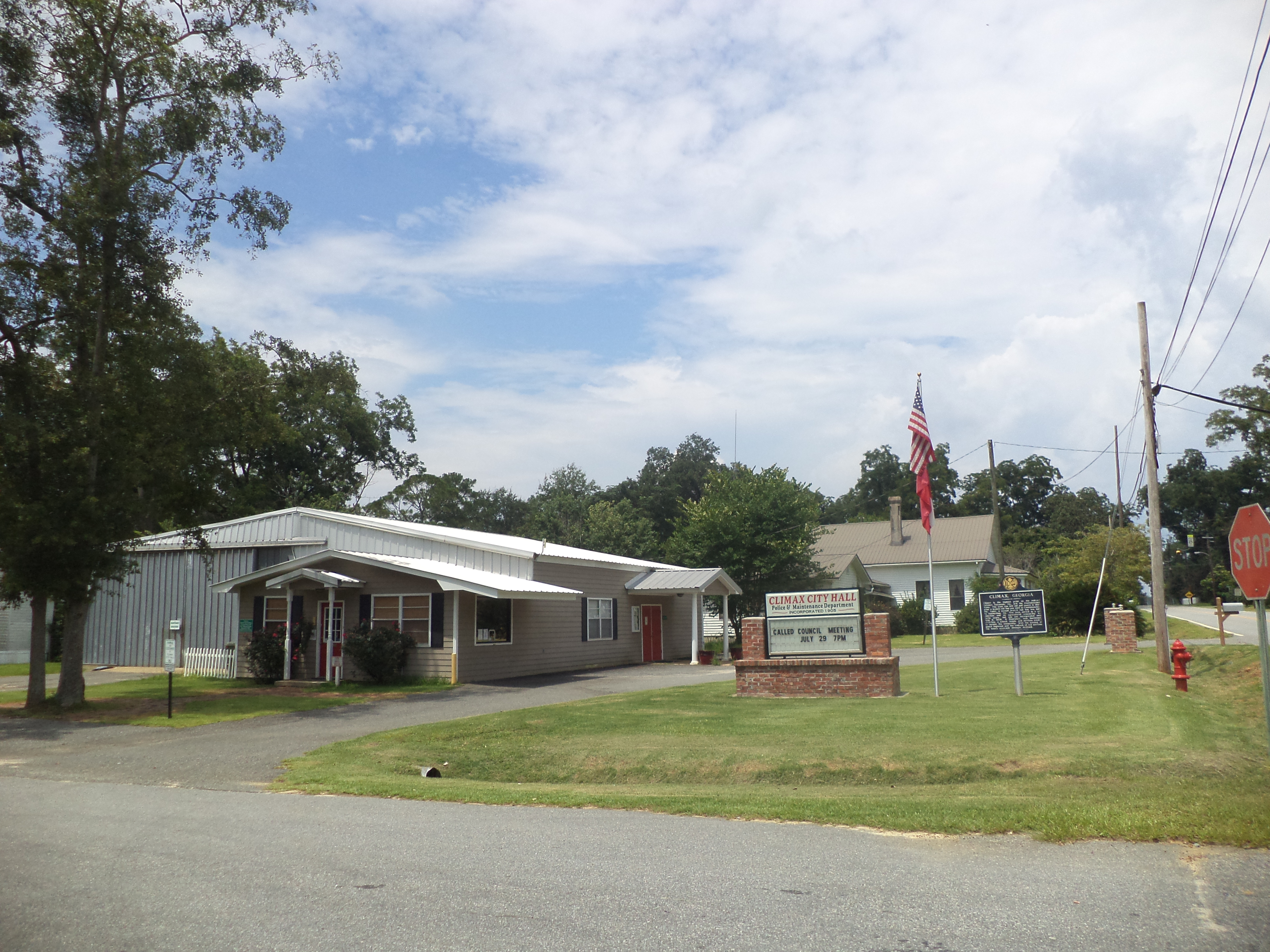
- Climax City Hall

- Location in Decatur County and the state of Georgia

- Location of the City of Climax, Georgia. Climax (Georgia)
- Coordinates: 30.8760°N 84.4313°W
- Country: United States
- State: Georgia
- County: Decatur County

Government
  - Mayor: Joseph Melvin Kelly

Area
  - Total: 0.80 sq mi (2.08 km^{2})
  - Land: 0.80 sq mi (2.08 km^{2})
  - Water: 0 sq mi (0.00 km^{2})
- Elevation: 285 ft (87 m)

Population (2020)
  - Total: 276
  - Density: 343.7/sq mi (132.69/km^{2})
- Time zone: UTC-5 (Eastern (EST))
  - Summer (DST): UTC-4 (EDT)
- ZIP codes: 31734, 39834
- Area code: 229
- GNIS pop ID: 355192
- GNIS city ID: 2404075
- FIPS code: 13-16908
- Website: cityofclimaxga.com

Climax is a city in Decatur County, Georgia, United States. The town was named "Climax" because it is located at the highest point of the railroad between Savannah, Georgia, and the Chattahoochee River. The population was 276 at the 2020 census, down from 280 at the 2010 census. It is part of the Bainbridge, Georgia Micropolitan Statistical Area.

== History ==
Climax was platted in 1833, and named for its lofty elevation. The Georgia General Assembly incorporated the place in 1905 as the "Town of Climax", with the municipal corporate limits extending in a one-half mile radius from the town's central water well.

== Geography ==
Climax is located in eastern Decatur County at coordinates 30.8760°N 84.4313°W. It sits on the crest of Curry Hill, a 300-foot-high (91 m) escarpment that forms the southwestern side of the Flint River valley.

U.S. Route 84 passes through Climax, leading west 10 miles (16 km) to Bainbridge, the Decatur County seat, and east 15 miles (24 km) to Cairo.

According to the United States Census Bureau, the town of Climax has a total area of 0.81 square miles (2.1 km^{2}), all land.

== Demographics ==
Historical population
Census	Pop.	Note	%±
1910	328		—
1920	345		5.2%
1930	451		30.7%
1940	372		−17.5%
1950	373		0.3%
1960	329		−11.8%
1970	275		−16.4%
1980	407		48.0%
1990	226		−44.5%
2000	297		31.4%
2010	280		−5.7%
2020	276		−1.4%
U.S. Decennial Census; 1850-1870 1870-1880; 1890-1910 1920-1930; 1940 1950 1960; 1970 1980 1990; 2000 2010

As of the census of 2000, there were 297 people, 116 households, and 78 families residing in the town. By 2020, there were 276 people in the town.

== Swine Time Festival ==
Climax's annual festival is held on the first Saturday after Thanksgiving. The event is attended by 35,000 people annually, a large number in light of Climax's sub-300 population. Contests and events include best-dressed pig, corn shucking, hog calling, eating chitterlings, pig racing, syrup making, baby crawling, and the great greased pig chase. The festival is commenced with a parade down Main Street that leads up to the event grounds. There is also a beauty contest for different age groups where the winner is crowned Miss and Little Miss Swine Time.

== Gallery ==
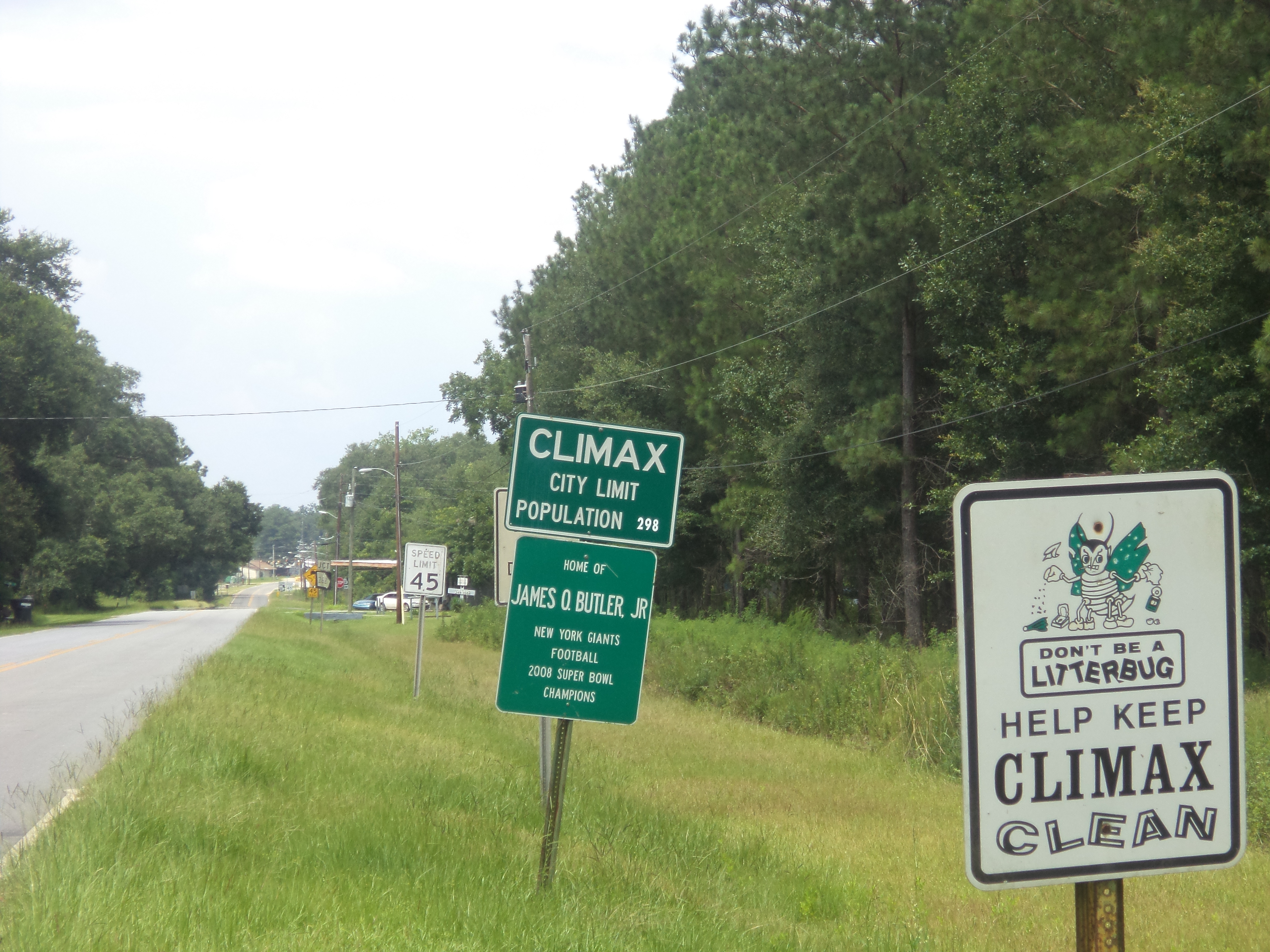
Climax city sign

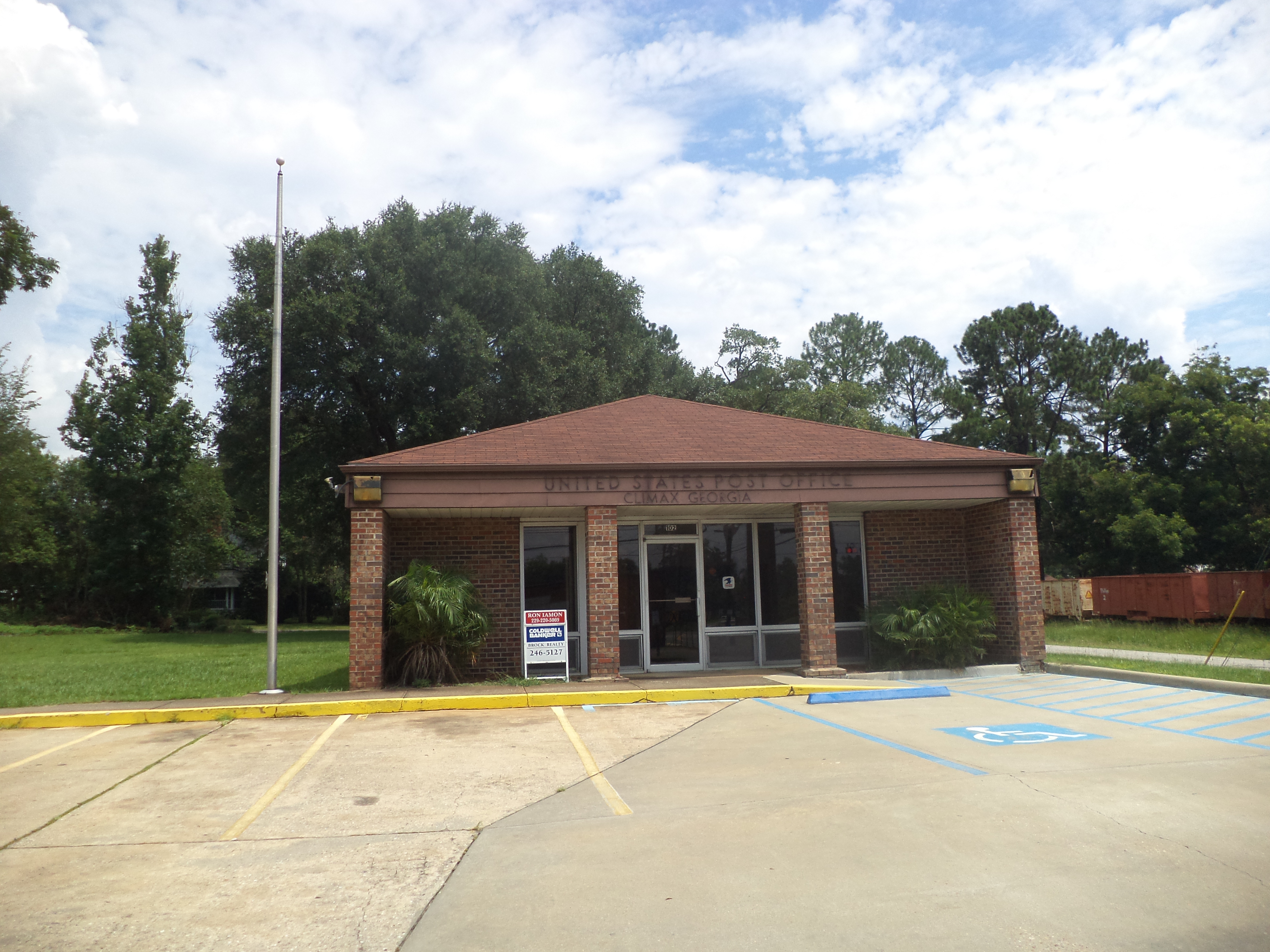
USPS post office in Climax

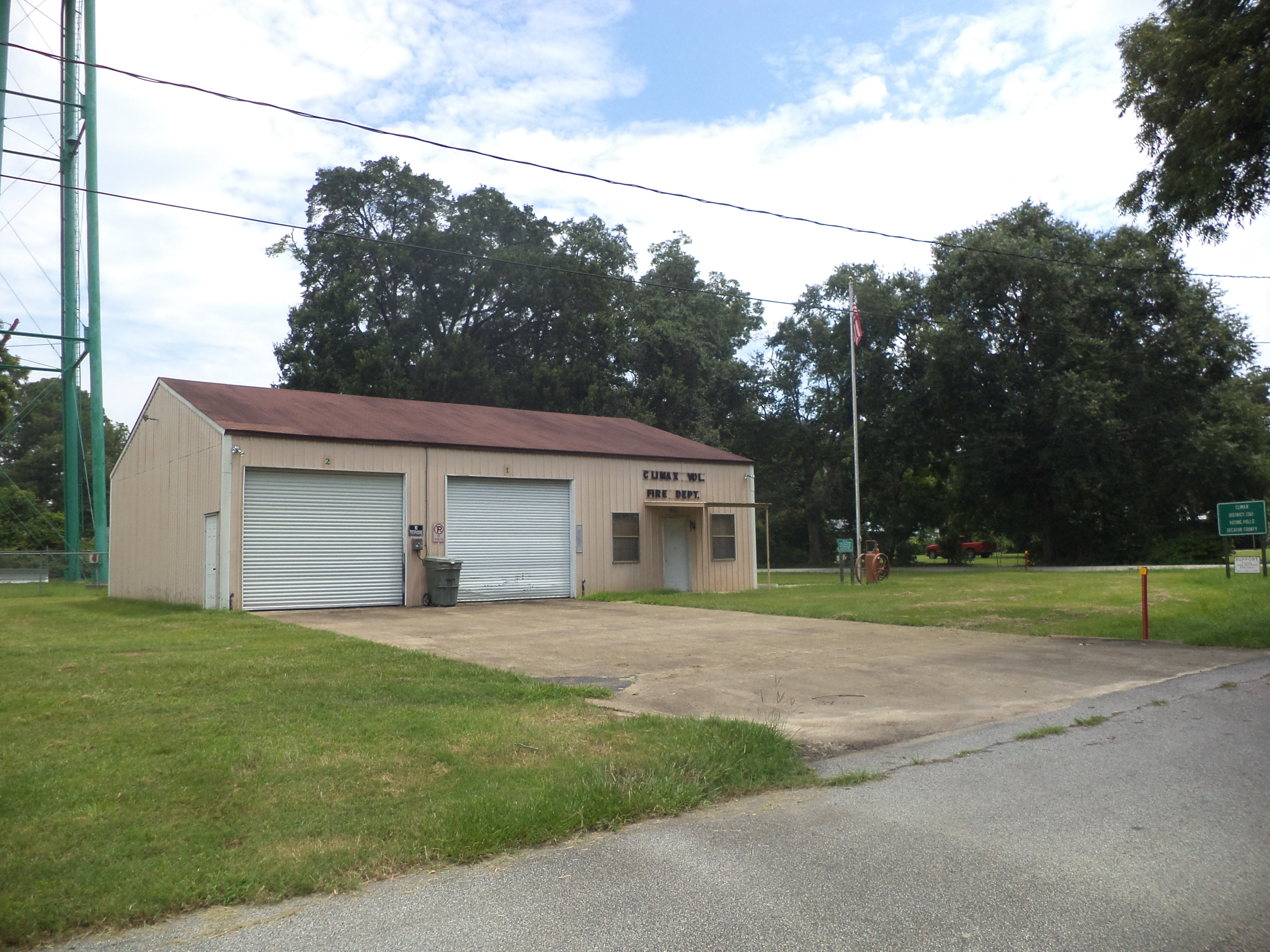
Climax Fire Department

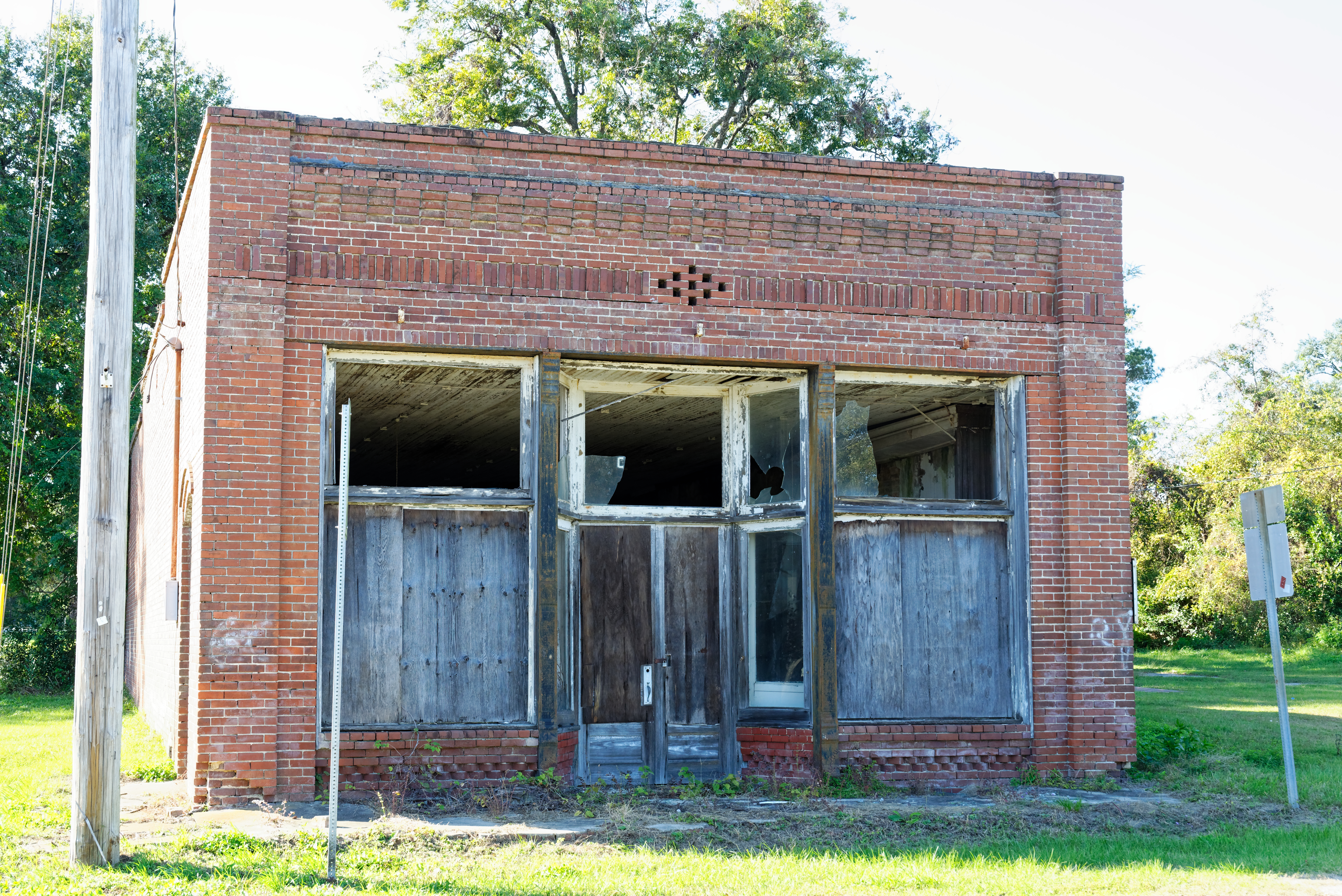
Allen Mercantile Company building
