= Bainbridge, Georgia =

City in Georgia, United States

- City
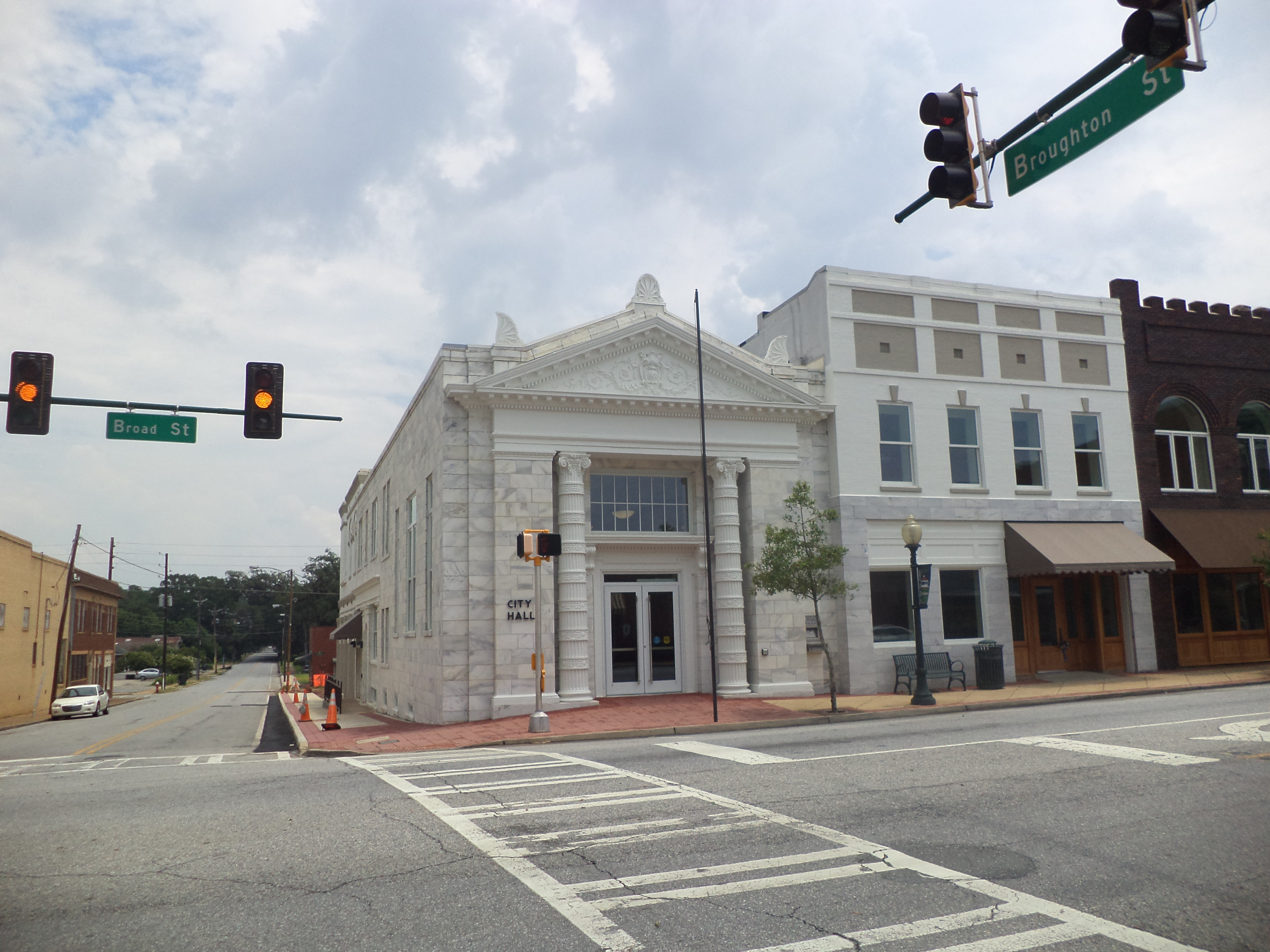
- Bainbridge City Hall

- Flag Seal Logo
- Motto: "Georgia's First Inland Port"
- Location in Decatur County and the state of Georgia
- Coordinates: 30°54′17″N 84°34′16″W
- Country: United States
- State: Georgia
- County: Decatur

Government
  - Mayor: Sylvia Washington

Area
  - City: 21.00 sq mi (54.40 km^{2})
  - Land: 19.78 sq mi (51.22 km^{2})
  - Water: 1.23 sq mi (3.18 km^{2})
- Elevation: 121 ft (37 m)

Population (2020)
  - City: 14,468
  - Density: 731.6/sq mi (282.47/km^{2})
  - Metro: 27,842
- Time zone: UTC-5 (Eastern (EST))
  - Summer (DST): UTC-4 (EDT)
- ZIP code: 39817, 39819
- Area code: 229
- FIPS code: 13-04896
- GNIS feature ID: 0354431
- Website: bainbridgecity.com

Bainbridge is a city in Decatur County, Georgia, United States. The city is the county seat of Decatur County. As of the 2020 census, the city had a population of 14,468, up from 12,697 at the 2010 census. It is the principal city of the Bainbridge, Georgia Micropolitan Statistical Area and a principal city in the Tallahassee—Bainbridge, FL-GA Combined Statistical Area.

== History ==
The first European settlement in what is today Bainbridge was a trading post set up by James Burges in the late 18th century. From him comes the name Burges's Bluff. The town was named after U.S. Navy Commodore William Bainbridge, commander of the USS Constitution ("Old Ironsides"), and was incorporated on December 22, 1829.

In 1824, Bainbridge was designated seat of the newly formed Decatur County.

On October 10, 2018, Bainbridge fell victim to Hurricane Michael. The storm left widespread damage through the city limits, including downed trees, power lines, and structural damage. Many residents affected suffered severe damage to their homes.

== Geography ==
Bainbridge is located in the center of Decatur County. The city is in southwestern Georgia along U.S. Routes 27 and 84, which form a bypass around the southern part of the city. U.S. Route 27 leads southeast 42 miles (68 km) to Tallahassee, Florida, and north 128 miles (206 km) to Columbus. U.S. Route 84 leads east 38 miles (61 km) to Thomasville and northwest 54 miles (87 km) to Dothan, Alabama. Other highways which run through the city include Georgia State Routes 97, 253, 309, and 311.

According to the United States Census Bureau, the city has a total area of 20.1 square miles (52.0 km^{2}), of which 18.8 square miles (48.7 km^{2}) is land and 1.3 square miles (3.3 km^{2}), or 6.40%, is water.

Bainbridge is located on the Flint River, which flows southwest to meet the Chattahoochee. Together they form the Apalachicola River which flows to the Gulf of Mexico. At the junction of the two rivers, the Jim Woodruff Dam forms Lake Seminole. A system of locks at the dam allows barge traffic to travel between the inland port at Bainbridge and the Gulf of Mexico.

== Demographics ==
Historical population
Census	Pop.	Note	%±
1860	1,869		—
1870	1,351		−27.7%
1880	1,436		6.3%
1890	1,668		16.2%
1900	2,641		58.3%
1910	4,217		59.7%
1920	4,792		13.6%
1930	6,141		28.2%
1940	6,352		3.4%
1950	7,562		19.0%
1960	12,714		68.1%
1970	10,887		−14.4%
1980	10,553		−3.1%
1990	10,712		1.5%
2000	11,722		9.4%
2010	12,697		8.3%
2020	14,468		13.9%
U.S. Decennial Census; 1850-1870 1870-1880; 1890-1910 1920-1930; 1940 1950 1960; 1970 1980 1990; 2000 2010

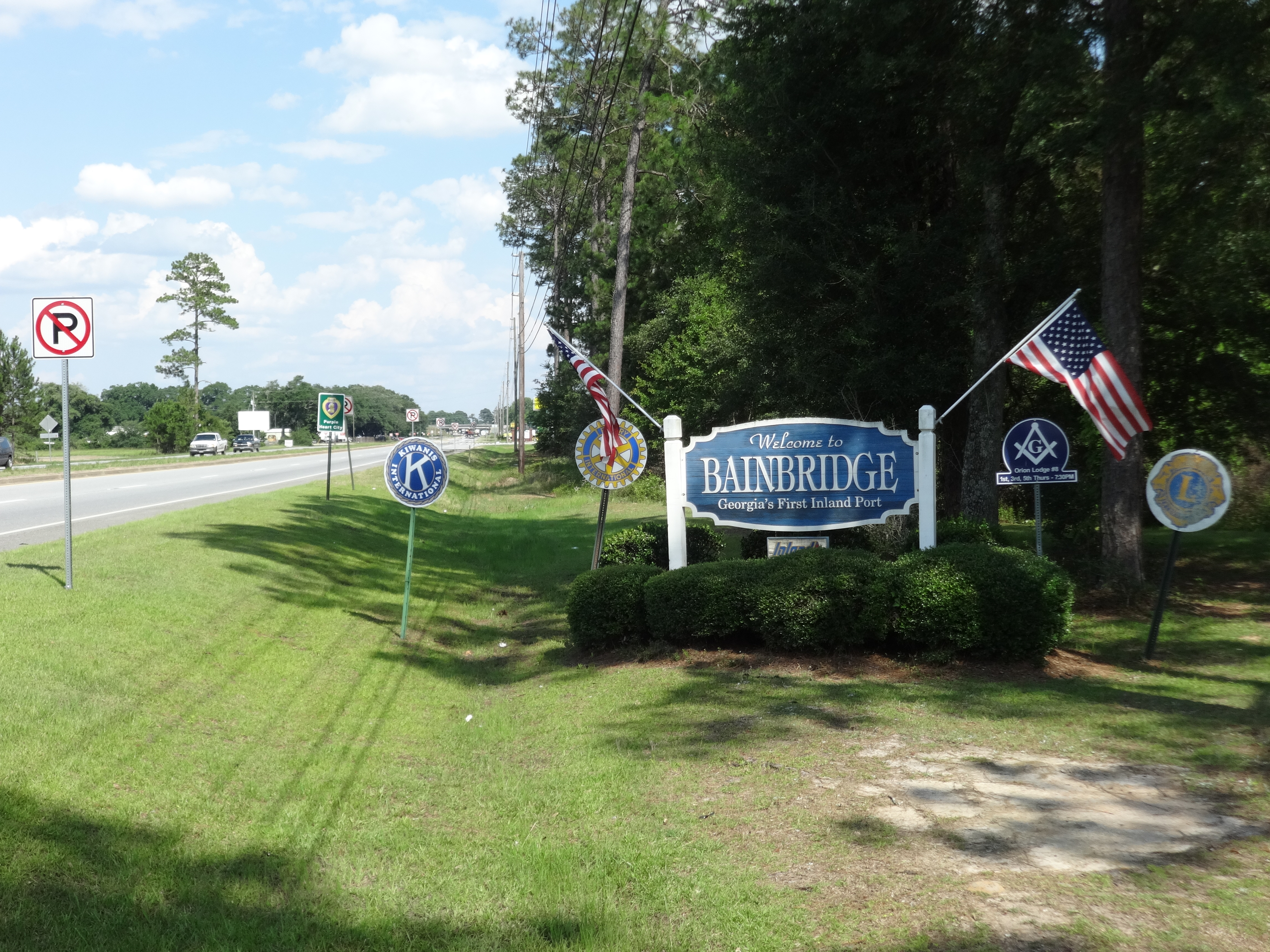
Bainbridge Welcome sign on U.S. Route 84

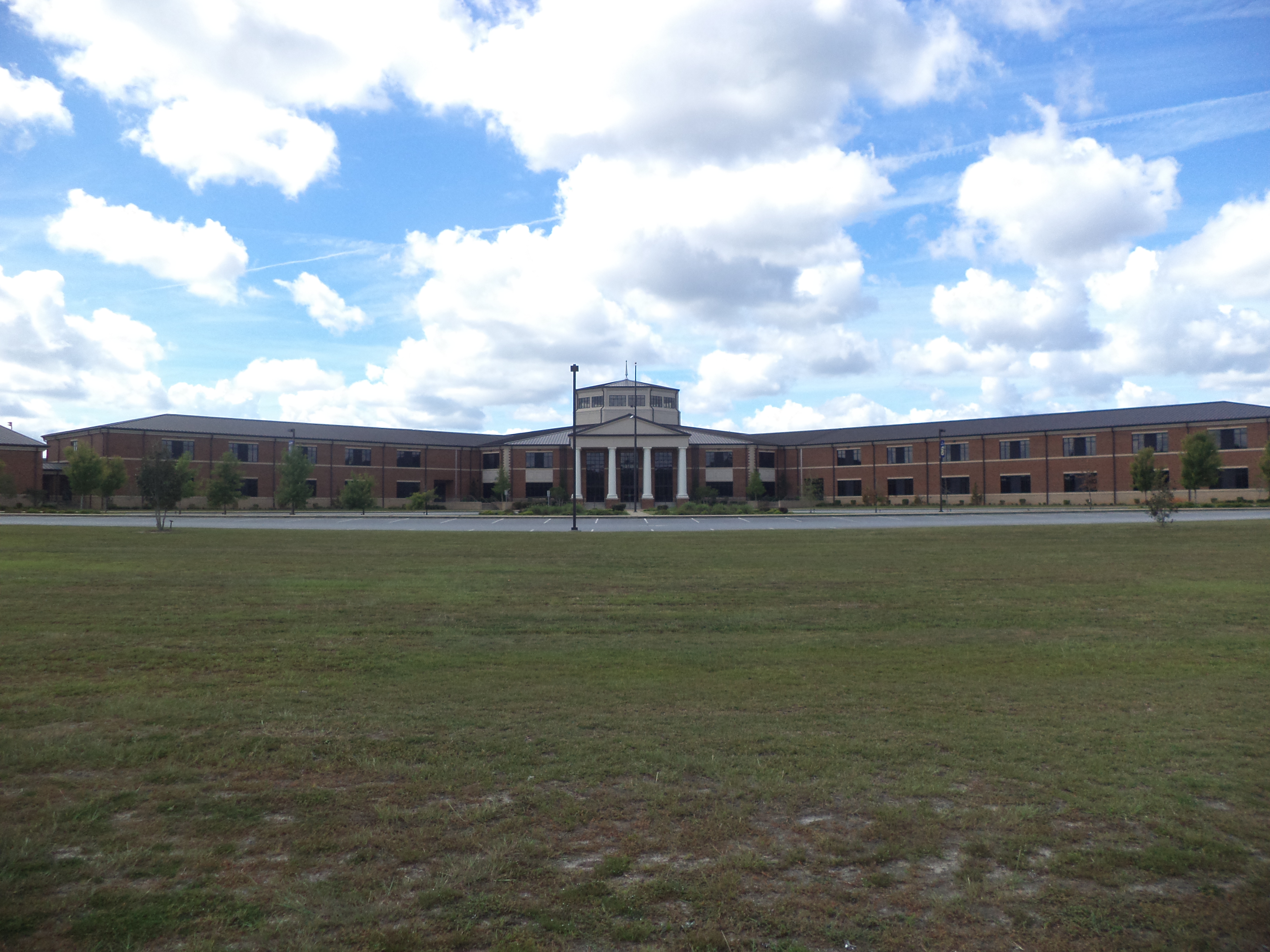
Bainbridge High School (North face)

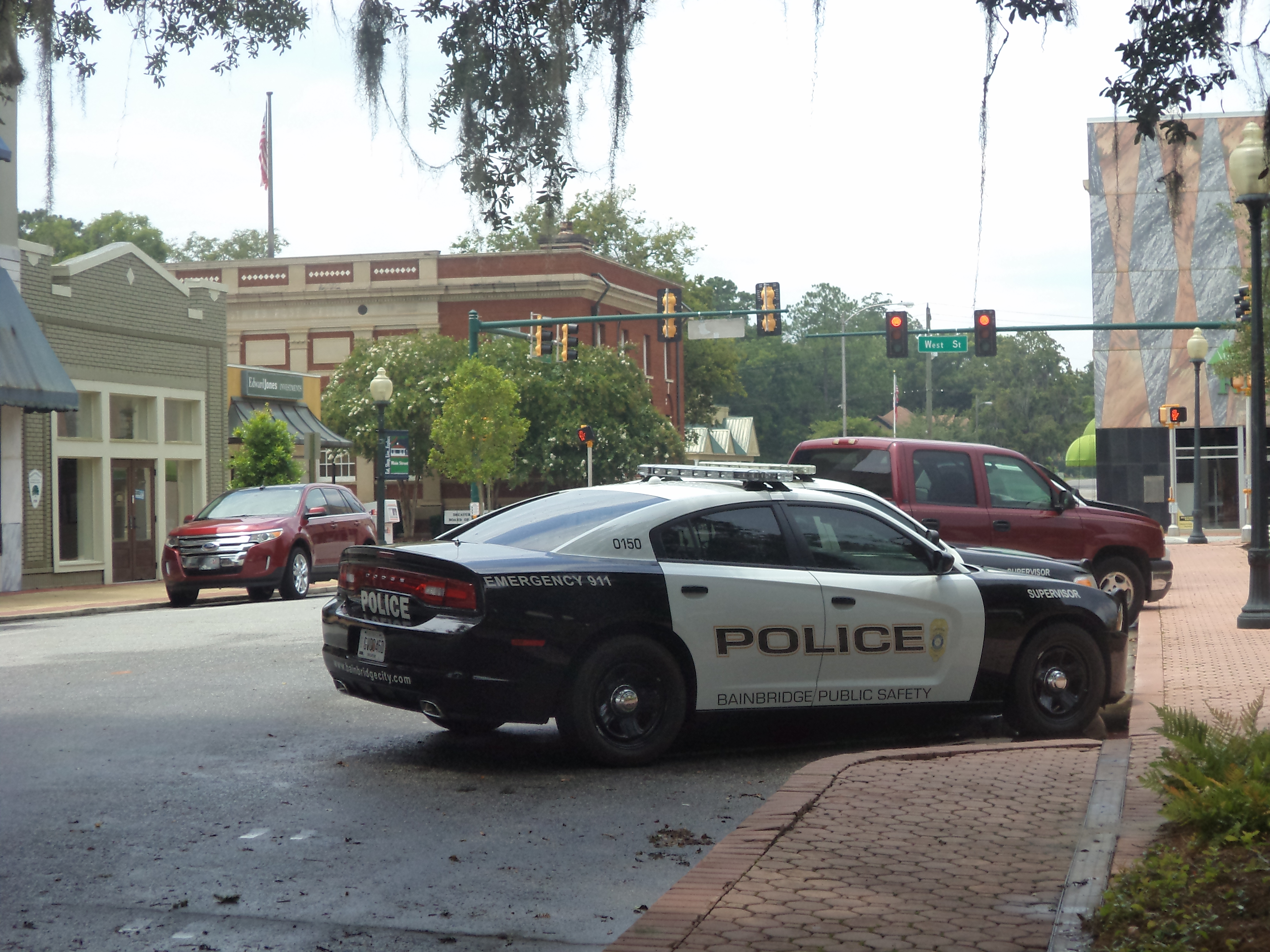
Bainbridge Public Safety Police Car

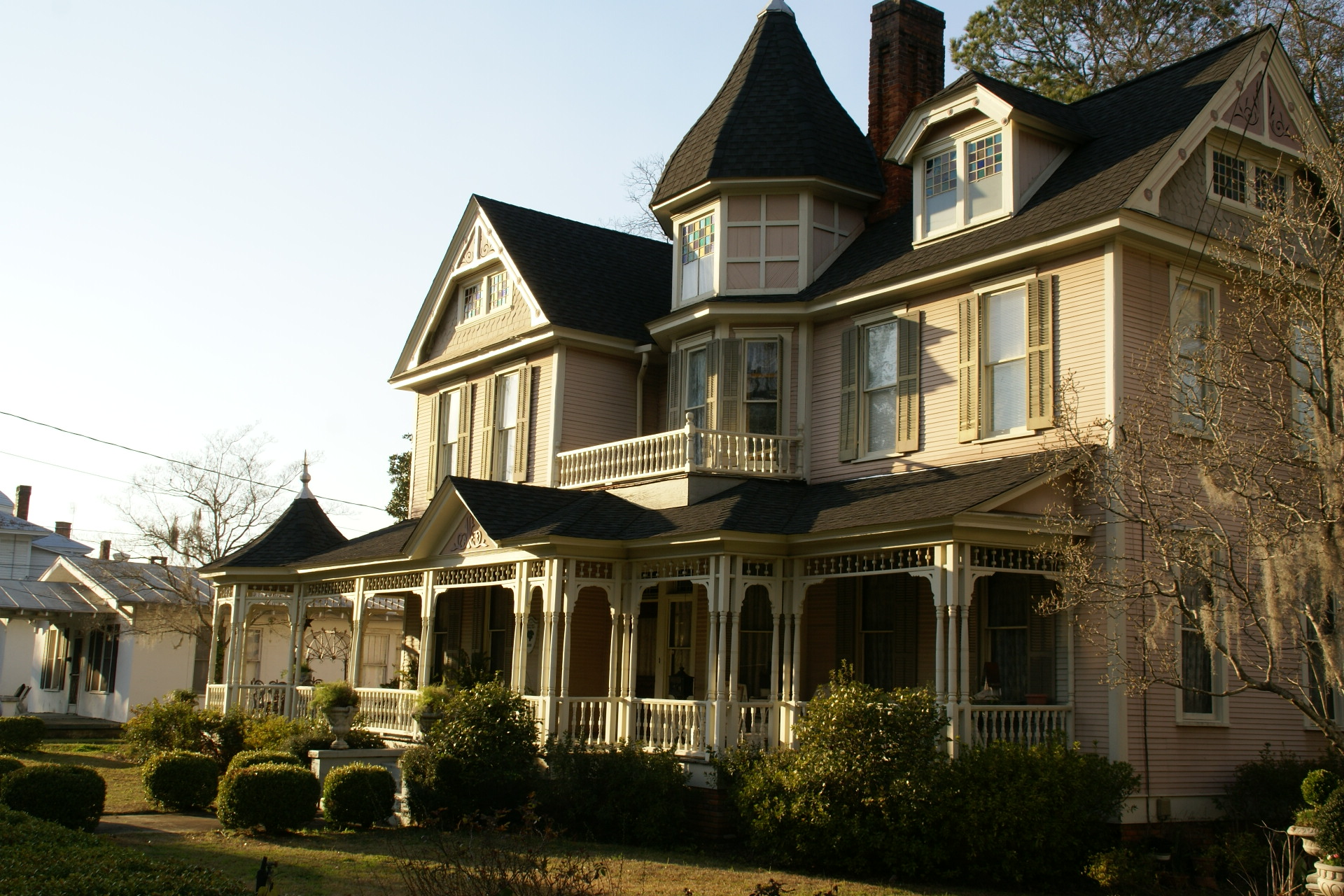
Historic house at Shotwell Street

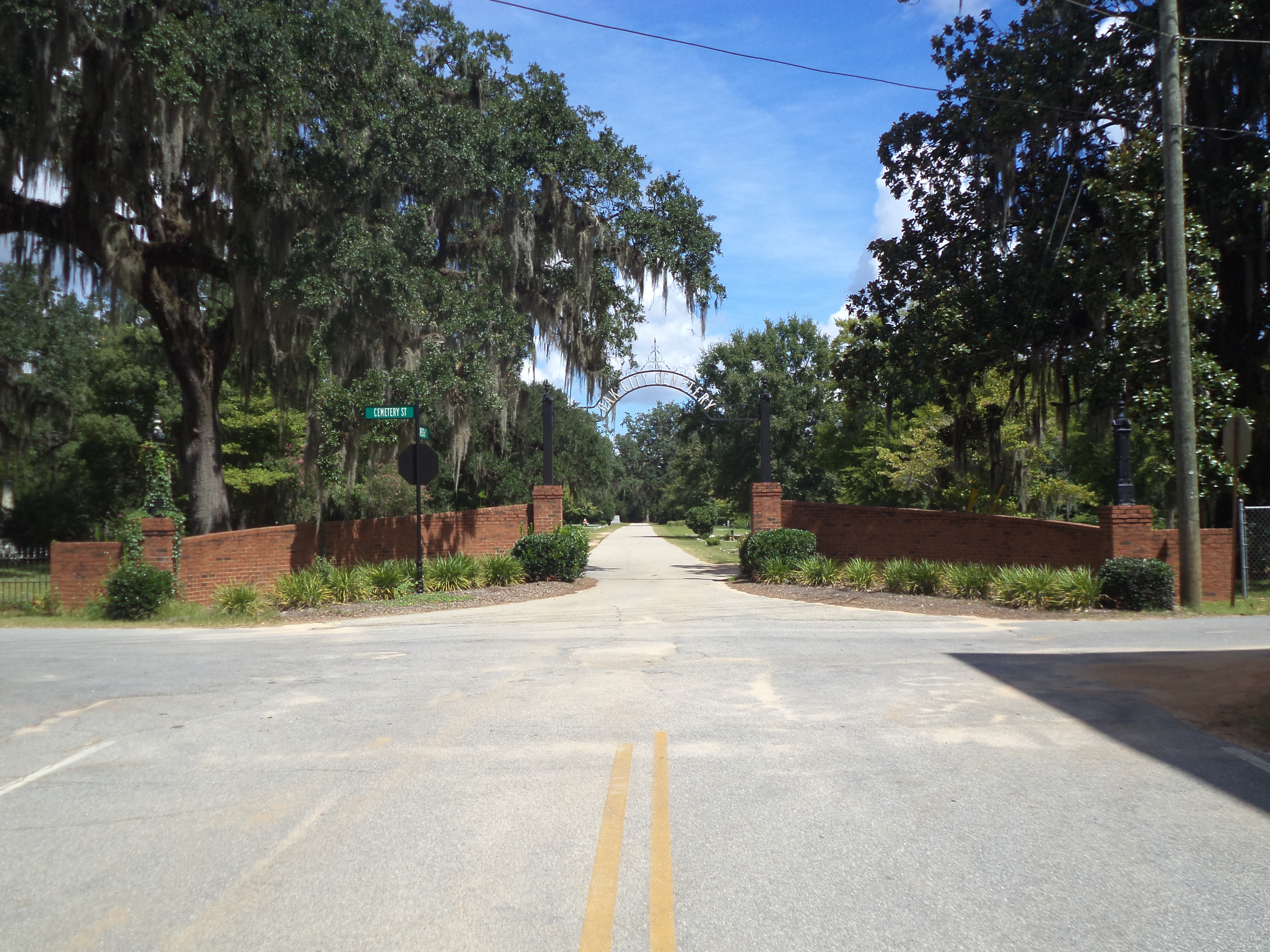
Oak City Cemetery, Bainbridge

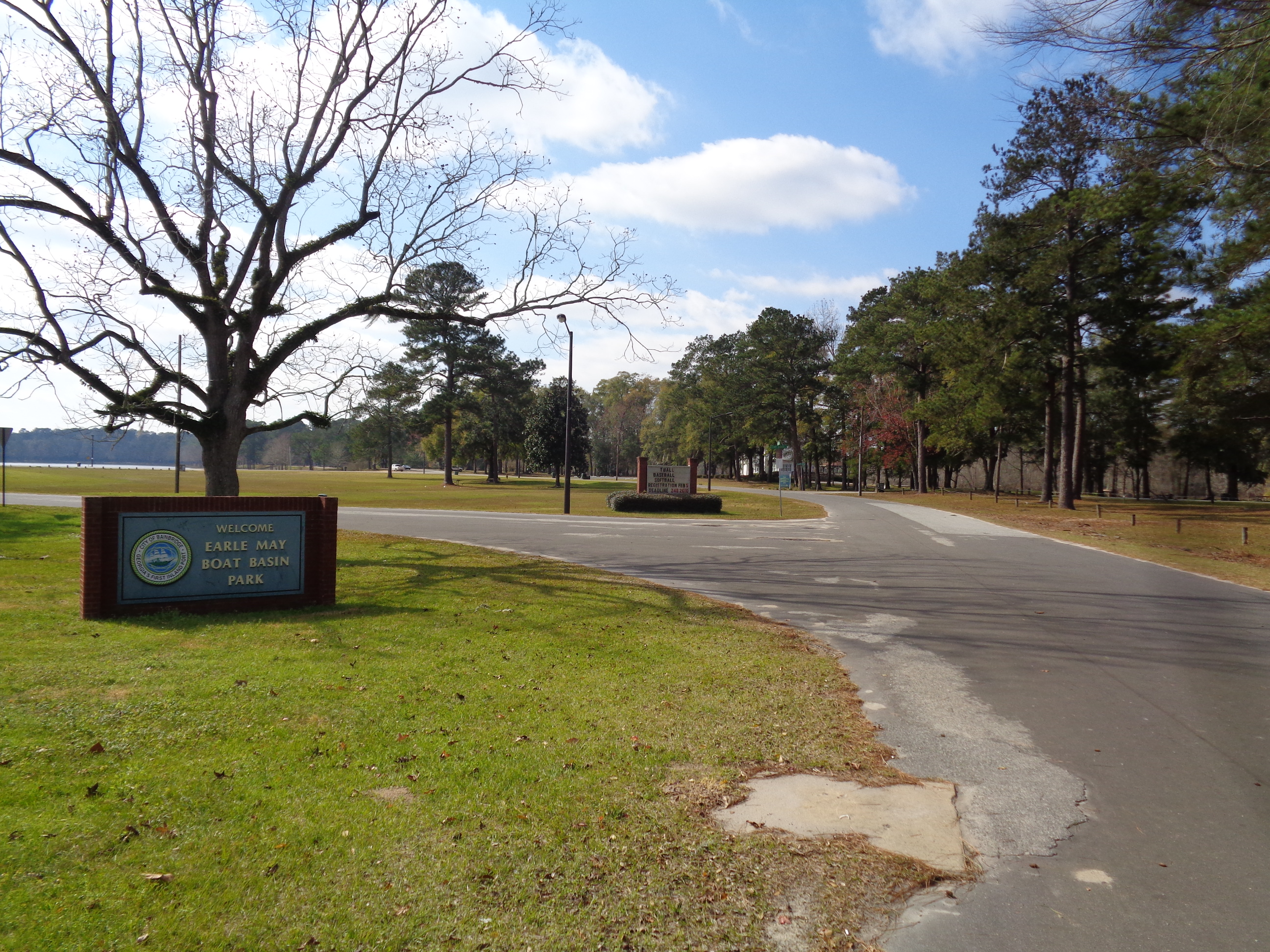
Welcome Earle May Boat Basin Park

=== 2020 census ===
As of the 2020 census, Bainbridge had a population of 14,468. The median age was 36.4 years. 26.0% of residents were under the age of 18 and 16.2% of residents were 65 years of age or older. For every 100 females there were 88.3 males, and for every 100 females age 18 and over there were 83.4 males age 18 and over.

88.4% of residents lived in urban areas, while 11.6% lived in rural areas.

There were 5,566 households in Bainbridge, including 3,111 families. Of all households, 34.0% had children under the age of 18 living in them. Of all households, 32.1% were married-couple households, 19.0% were households with a male householder and no spouse or partner present, and 42.7% were households with a female householder and no spouse or partner present. About 30.5% of all households were made up of individuals, and 13.1% had someone living alone who was 65 years of age or older.

There were 6,327 housing units, of which 12.0% were vacant. The homeowner vacancy rate was 2.5% and the rental vacancy rate was 6.6%.

Bainbridge racial makeup as of 2020
Race	Num.	Perc.
White	5,106	35.29%
Black or African American	8,106	56.03%
Native American	31	0.21%
Asian	117	0.81%
Pacific Islander	4	0.03%
Other/Mixed	336	2.32%
Hispanic or Latino	768	5.31%

== Economy ==
It was announced in December 2019 that Brazil-based gun manufacturer Taurus had been granted a $39 million tax-incentive package to move from the Miami, Florida area to Bainbridge in return for creating 300 jobs. The package includes $20 million for construction, $7.9 million in tax credits, $4.5 million for infrastructure, $4.3 million in property-tax abatements, and $3 million for equipment, in addition to a land lease arrangement of $1/year for 73 acres (30 hectares) of land. The subsidy totals $130,000 per job.

== Arts and culture ==
=== Arts ===
- The Firehouse Gallery Art Gallery
- Bainbridge Little Theatre

=== Annual cultural events ===
River Town Days is held each year the second weekend of March.

The Swine Time Festival and Decatur County Fall Festival and Fair are annual events.

=== National Register of Historic Places ===
The Decatur County Courthouse was constructed in 1902, and is listed on the National Register of Historic Places. Also listed on the Register is the First African Missionary Baptist Church.

=== Public library ===
The Decatur County Gilbert H. Gragg Library is located in Bainbridge. The library serves the population of Decatur County and acts as the headquarters for the Southwest Georgia Regional Library.

== Education ==
=== Decatur County School District ===
The Decatur County School District holds pre-school to grade 12, and consists of two primary schools, one elementary school, one middle school, and a high school. The district has 384 full-time teachers and over 5,782 students.

Schools include:

- Jones-Wheat Primary School (grades PreK-2)
- West Bainbridge Primary School (grades PreK-2)
- Hutto Elementary School (grades 3–5)
- Bainbridge Middle School (grades 6–8)
- Bainbridge High School (grades 9–12)

=== Other schools ===
- Grace Christian Academy (PreK-12)
- Spring Creek Charter Academy (PreK-10)

== Media ==
WTLH (channel 49) is licensed to Bainbridge and serves the Tallahassee, Florida–Thomasville, Georgia market as an affiliate of Heroes & Icons.

== Parks and recreation ==
The Bainbridge-Decatur County YMCA opened on September 15, 1986. Its building had a cost of $1,000,000.

== Infrastructure ==
=== Transportation ===
The city is a seaport linked to the Gulf of Mexico via Florida's Apalachicola River. Officially known as Port Bainbridge, these facilities are managed entirely by the Georgia Ports Authority.

The Decatur County Industrial Air Park, located 6 miles (10 km) northwest of the city, provides general aviation service to the community.

== Notable people ==
- James Butler, former NFL player and Georgia Tech player
- Alfred Corn, poet and essayist; born Bainbridge, raised in Valdosta
- Marvin Griffin, former Georgia governor
- Miriam Hopkins, Academy Award-nominated film actress
- Paul Kwilecki, documentary photographer
- Jason Lancaster, Singer and guitarist of Mayday Parade, singer of Go Radio, and solo career
- Dameon Pierce, NFL player - current Running Back for Philadelphia Eagles, formerly with Florida Gators
- Brian Powell, former MLB pitcher - Drafted by Detroit Tigers
- David Ross, MLB catcher, two-time World Series champion, Dancing with the Stars contestant
- Kirby Smart, head football coach for the University of Georgia
- Travis Smith, former drummer of Trivium
- Young Stribling, professional heavyweight boxer
