= Burgess E. Scruggs =

American physician (1860–1934)

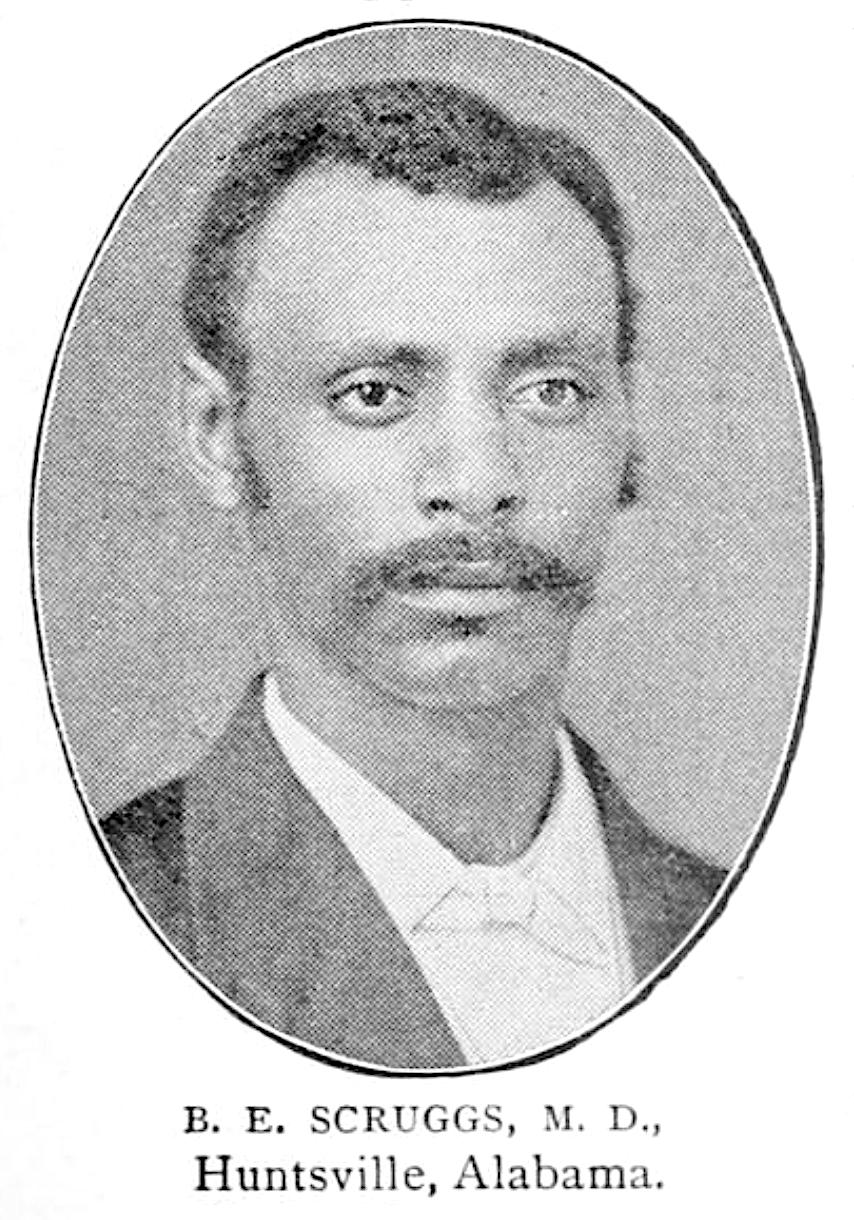
- Scruggs, around 1902
- Born: October 16, 1860; Madison County, Alabama, U.S.
- Died: January 21, 1934 (aged 73); Huntsville, Alabama, U.S.
- Burial place: Glenwood Cemetery (Huntsville, Alabama)
- Education: Central Alabama College, Central Tennessee College, Meharry Medical College
- Occupations: Physician, alderman, civic leader
- Spouse(s): Sophia J. Davidson (m. 1881–1919; her death), Harriet T. Humphrey (m. 1923–1934; his death)
- Children: 1

Burgess E. Scruggs (October 16, 1860 – January 21, 1934) was an American physician, alderman, and civic leader in Huntsville, Alabama. He was one of Alabama's first African American doctors, and the first in Huntsville. He served four terms on Huntsville's city council.

== Early life and education ==
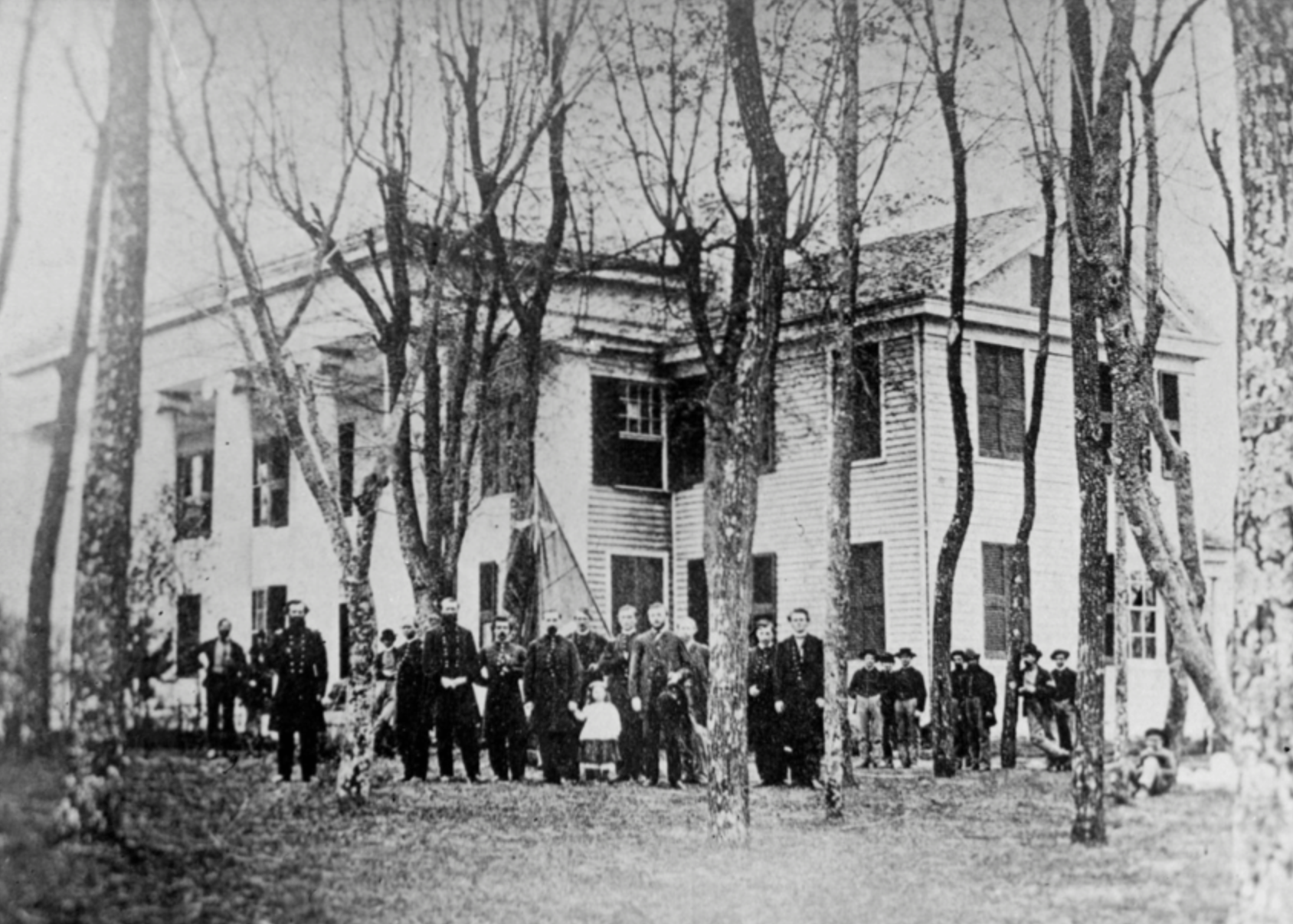
The Lanford–McCalley Plantation House in 1865, owned by Thomas Sanford McCalley

Scruggs was born on October 16, 1860, in Madison County, Alabama. He was enslaved at his birth at the by the Thomas Sanford McCalley family. His Black family was Christian. After being freed after the American Civil War ended, he attended school and graduated from William Hooper Councill High School.

Scruggs attended Central Alabama College in Birmingham, Alabama, and Central Tennessee College (now Walden University) in Nashville; before graduating from Meharry Medical College in 1879, a private historically black medical school in Nashville.

== Career ==
He returned to Huntsville after graduation, and opened a private medical practice at 316 W. Holmes Street. Other early Black doctors in Alabama at this time included Arthur McKinnon Brown of Birmingham, Halle Tanner Dillon Johnson of Tuskegee, and Cornelius N. Dorsette of Montgomery.

In 1881, Scruggs and Sophia J. Davidson married. After her death in 1919, Scruggs and Harriet T. Humphrey married in 1923.

Scruggs served four years as city alderman for Huntsville from 1892 until 1896. He also served as a trustee for the Rust Normal School, was president of the Black Fair Association, and served on the U.S. Board of Examiners, and Board of Pensions.

Scruggs died after an illness on January 21, 1934, at his home in Huntsville, and is buried at Glenwood Cemetery in Huntsville.
