= Arthur McKinnon Brown =

American physician (1867–1939)

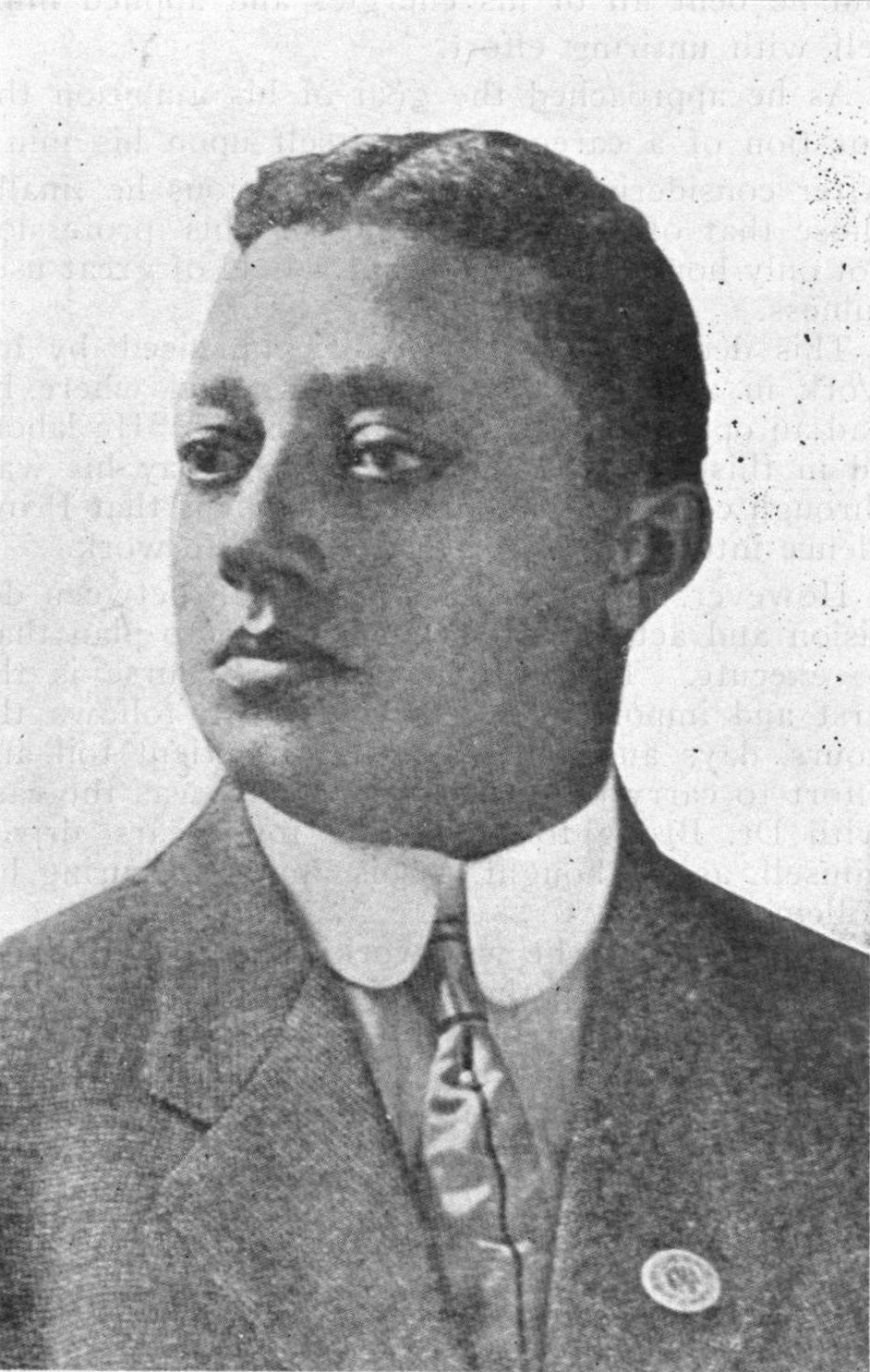
- Born: November 9, 1867; Raleigh, North Carolina, United States
- Died: December 4, 1939 (aged 72); Birmingham, Alabama, United States
- Burial place: Oak Hill Cemetery, Birmingham, Alabama, United States
- Other names: Arthur McKimmon Brown
- Education: Lincoln University, University of Michigan Medical School

Arthur McKinnon Brown (November 9, 1867 – December 4, 1939), also known as Arthur McKimmon Brown, was an American physician. In the city of Birmingham, Alabama, Brown was one of the earliest African American physicians, and the first African American surgeon in the United States Army. He was an influential in the creation of the Children's Home Hospital of Birmingham. For many years it was the only hospital in the city where Black doctors could practice.

== Early life and education ==
Arthur McKinnon Brown was born November 9, 1867, in Raleigh, North Carolina. He attended public school in Raleigh.

Brown graduated in 1888 from Lincoln University in Pennsylvania. He continued his educator at the University of Michigan Medical School (now University of Michigan Medicine), and graduated in 1891 as a surgeon.

== Career ==
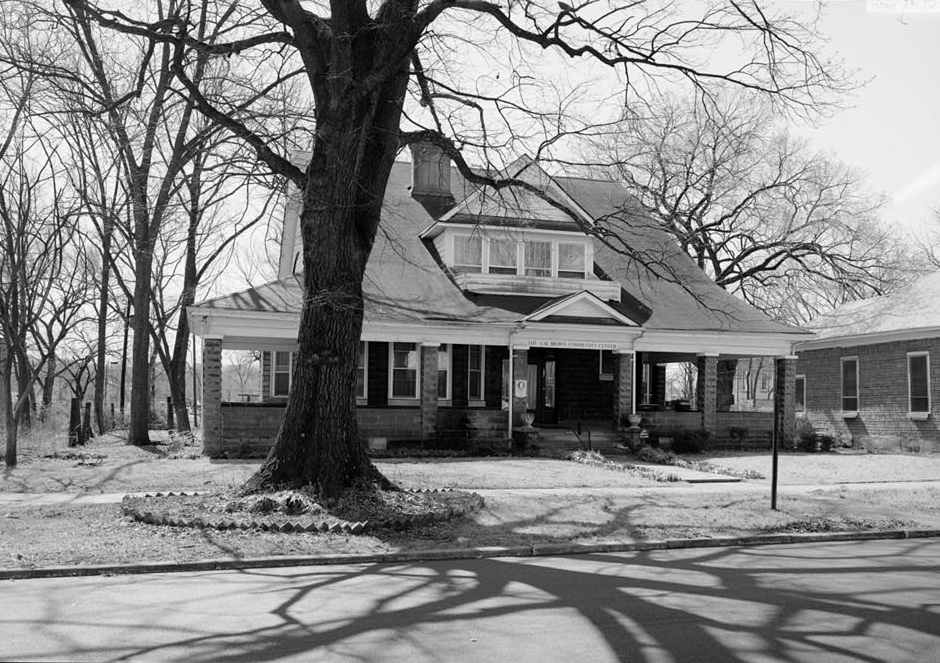
Dr. A.M. Brown House in Birmingham, Alabama; NRHP-listed

He passed the Alabama state medical examination, and opened up a private practice in Bessemer. Other early Black doctors in Alabama at this time included Burgess E. Scruggs of Huntsville, Halle Tanner Dillon Johnson of Tuskegee, and Cornelius N. Dorsette of Montgomery. In 1893, during the Panic of 1893 national financial crisis caused Brown to move to Birmingham, after a brief move to Cleveland, Ohio.

During the Spanish–American War, Brown volunteered as a surgeon and accepted the role despite not being compensated, meanwhile the white surgeons in the war were given benefits. He was assigned as commander to the 10th Cavalry Regiment, a Black military unit serving in Cuba. He was shot by white hospital steward Thomas C. Reeds and his contract with the military was cancelled, he was dishonorably discharged in June 1899.

Brown was active in organizations for Black physicians, and also served as president of the National Medical Association in 1914.

== Death and legacy ==
Brown died after an illness on December 4, 1939, in his home in Birmingham, Alabama. He is buried at Oak Hill Cemetery in Birmingham.
