= Lynching of African-American veterans after World War I =

African Americans who were lynched in the U.S.

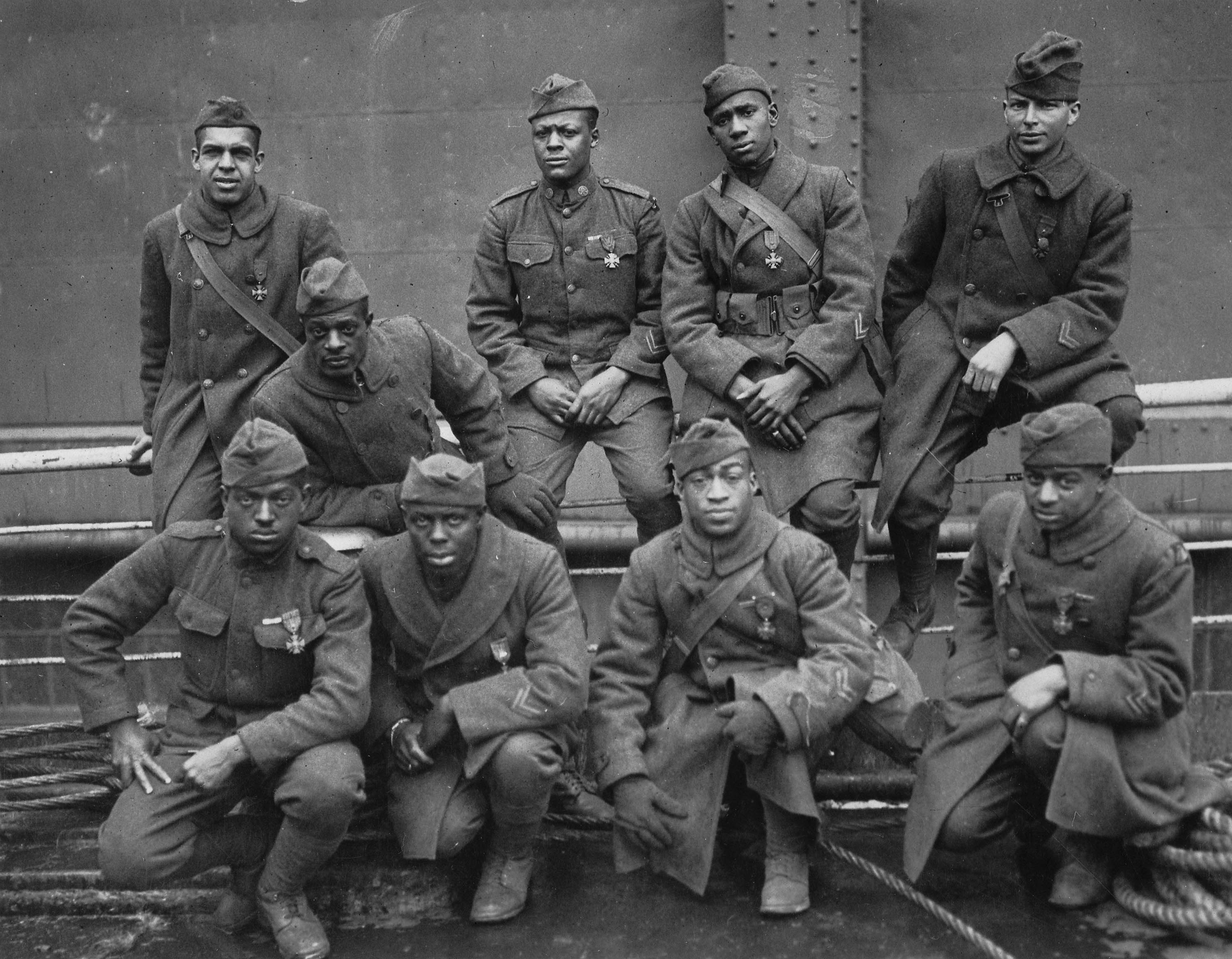
Soldiers of the 369th (15th N.Y.) who won the Croix de guerre for gallantry in action, 1919

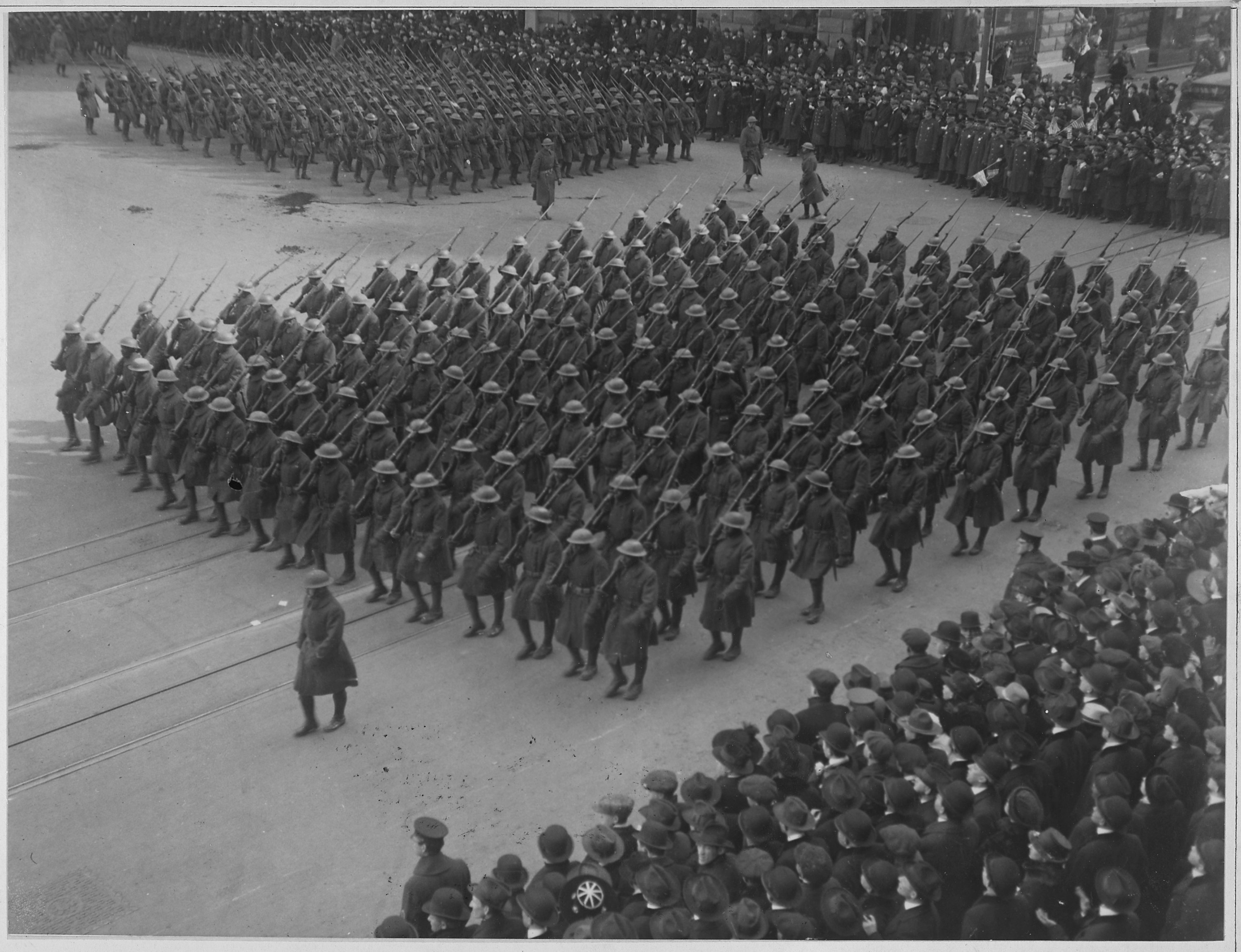
Colonel Hayward's "Hell Fighters" in parade

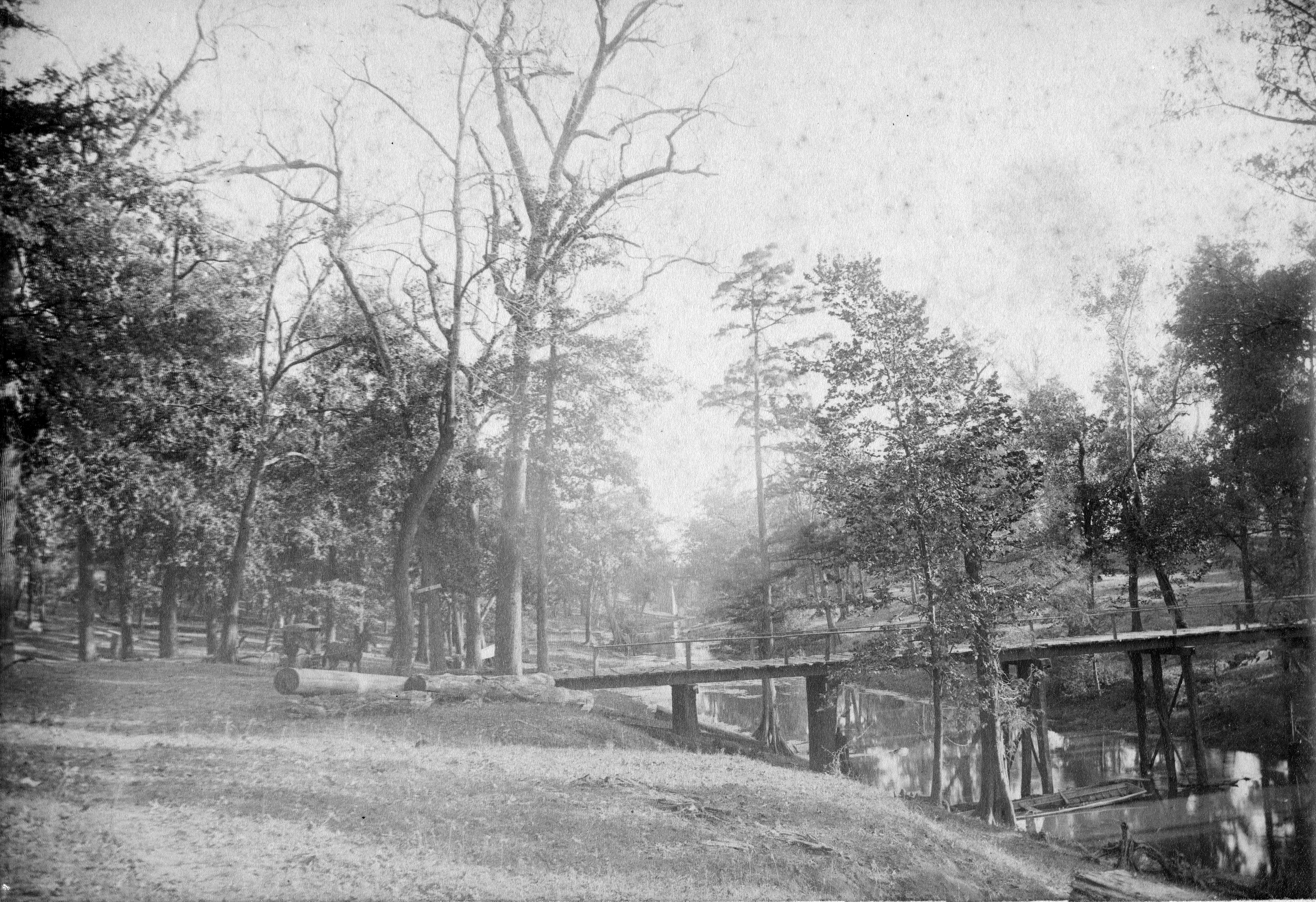
Black veteran L. B. Reed was suspected of having a relationship with a white woman and hanged over the Sunflower River Bridge, Clarksdale, Mississippi

After young African-American men volunteered to fight against the Central Powers, during World War I, many of them returned home but instead of being rewarded for their military service, they were subjected to discrimination, racism and lynchings by the citizens and the government. Labor shortages in essential industries caused a massive migration of southern African-Americans to northern cities leading to a wide-spread emergence of segregation in the north and the regeneration of the Ku Klux Klan. For many African-American veterans, as well as the majority of the African-Americans in the United States, the times which followed the war were fraught with challenges similar to those they faced overseas. Discrimination and segregation were at the forefront of everyday life, but most prevalent in schools, public revenues, and housing. Although members of different races who had fought in World War I believed that military service was a price which was worth paying in exchange for equal citizenship, this was not the case for African-Americans. The decades which followed World War I included blatant acts of racism and nationally recognized events which conveyed American society's portrayal of African-Americans as 2nd class citizens. Although the United States had just won The Great War in 1918, the national fight for equal rights was just beginning.

== Background ==
=== World War I ===
World War I began with the assassination of Austrian Archduke Franz Ferdinand on June 28, 1914 and it ended with the signing of the Armistice of November 11, 1918. Though the fighting stopped, the war's potential to resume still existed and peace was only reached when representatives of Germany signed the Treaty of Versailles on June 28, 1919, exactly five years after the assassination of Archduke Franz Ferdinand. On April 2, 1917, President Woodrow Wilson declared war on Germany after Germany resumed its submarine attacks on merchant and passenger ships. When the United States sent men to the fronts of Europe, the United States Armed Forces remained segregated, with all-black and all-white units. Despite the segregation and the mistreatment which they were constantly being subjected to by everyday society, many African Americans volunteered to join the Allied war effort. By the time of the signing of the armistice with Germany, more than 350,000 African Americans had joined the military and served with the American Expeditionary Forces (AEF) on the Western Front. Around 50,000 of those 350,000 experienced combat and a total of 770 African-Americans who fought for their country paid with their lives. On top of that, during the course of World War I, over 400,000 black citizens who were searching for defense jobs migrated from the rural south to the urban north in order to fill the need for laborers which existed in essential industries. Although this provided new opportunities for many African American, it would go on to encourage widespread segregation and discrimination in the north after the war was over.

=== Reaction to returning veterans ===
Historically, when a war is over, those who served are lauded for their heroism and patriotism. However, that has not always been the case for American soldiers of African descent. African American soldiers who served in World War I were treated worse before, during, and after the war than any other group of American soldiers.

During a homecoming celebration for African-American veterans of World War I in Norfolk, Virginia a race riot broke out on July 21, 1919. At least two people were killed and three others were injured. City officials had to call in the Marines and Navy personnel to restore order.

On August 16, 1917, Senator James K. Vardaman of Mississippi spoke of his fear of black veterans returning to the South, as he viewed that it would "inevitably lead to disaster." To the American South, the use of black soldiers in the military was a threat, not a virtue. "Impress the negro with the fact that he is defending the flag, inflate his untutored soul with military airs, teach him that it is his duty to keep the emblem of the Nation flying triumphantly in the air," and, the senator cautioned, "it is but a short step to the conclusion that his political rights must be respected."

Often violence broke out between serving members of the military. In both the Bisbee Riot (July 3, 1919) and the New London riots of 1919 active African-American service members were attacked by white mobs or white military units.

Many black soldiers in the years after the war were threatened with violence if they were caught wearing their uniform. Many others were even physically attacked, sometimes barely escaping with their lives. During an April 5, 1919, market day in Sylvester, Georgia, black veteran Daniel Mack was walking through a busy street and brushed against a white man. The white man was offended that Mack did not show the proper amount of respect and the two got in a scuffle; police came on the scene and promptly arrested Mack for assault. He was sentenced to 30 days in prison. A few days into his sentence, on April 14, a white mob broke into the prison, took him out into the wilderness and lynched Mack; he survived by playing dead. No arrests were ever made. Elisha Harper, 25 years old, was the son of the Rev. T. F. Harper, a respectable and "well-behaved preacher" living in Helena. He fought in the army during World War I and just returned from Europe. On July 24, 1919, while walking the streets of Newberry, South Carolina, he allegedly insulted a 14-year-old girl, who promptly reported him to the authorities. Harper was arrested and thrown in jail. Soon a white mob had gathered and would have lynched Harper if it was not for the local Sheriff who hid him away.

Military service provided by African-Americans overseas and at home made little difference in citizenship for African-Americans. American society still perceived African Americans the same after the war as they did before the war.

== Lynched African-American veterans ==
The following is an incomplete list of African Americans who had served in the military during WWI and were killed by white mobs with no trials for alleged crimes. Lynching is embedded deep in America's racial psyche. By 1919, lynching had developed into a programmatic ritual of torture and empowerment to the white race. The accurate number of African American veterans lynched in military uniform is unknown, but there were several cases of beatings and lynchings for the refusal to remove a military uniform, most notably the lynching of Wilbur Little in the spring of 1919. Apparent from the table, the vast majority of lynchings took place in the southeast region of the United States. The three states with the largest number of African American lynchings from 1850 - 1929 were Georgia, Mississippi and Texas.

Name	City	County or parish	State	Date	Accusation	Lynching	Ref
Unknown	Pine Bluff	Jefferson	Arkansas		Insult of white woman – refused to move off a sidewalk for a white woman	Tied to a tree with tire chains, and shot as many as 50 times	
Private Charles Lewis	Tyler Station (near Hickman)	Fulton	Kentucky	December 16, 1918	Alleged robbery	Masked men stormed the jail, smashed the locks with a sledgehammer, and hanged him from a tree	
Black vet and a black woman	Pickens	Holmes	Mississippi	May 5, 1919	Insult of white woman – black woman wrote an "improper note" to a young white woman		
Sgt. Maj. John Green	Birmingham	Jefferson	Alabama	June 12, 1919	Asking for change from a conductor aboard a segregated outbound Pratt-Endsley streetcar to Dozier Park	Shot three times in the head	
Robert Truett	Louise	Humphreys	Mississippi	July 15, 1919	Insult of white woman – alleged indecent proposal to a white woman	Hanged Robert Truett, a veteran who was 18 years old	
Clinton Briggs	Lincoln	Washington	Arkansas	August 3, 1919	Insult of white woman – moved too slowly out of white woman's way	Chained to a tree, shot till dead	
L. B. Reed	Clarksdale	Coahoma	Mississippi	September 10, 1919	Suspected of having a relationship with a white woman	Hanged from the bridge across the Sunflower River	
Robert Crosky	Montgomery	Montgomery	Alabama	September 29, 1919	Alleged assault of a white woman	Shot by a mob	
Miles Phifer	Montgomery	Montgomery	Alabama	September 29, 1919	Alleged assault of a white woman	Shot by a mob	
Frank Livingston	El Dorado	Union	Arkansas	May 21, 1919	Alleged murder	100 people gathered to burn Mr. Livingston alive	
Bud Johnson	Pace	Santa Rosa	Florida	March 12, 1919	Alleged assault of a white woman	Chained to a stake, burnt alive, his skull was split with a hatchet and pieces given to onlookers as souvenirs	
Lucius McCarty	Bogalusa	Washington	Louisiana	August 31, 1919	Alleged attempted assault of a white woman	Mob dragged his body behind a car killing him before burning his corpse in a bonfire	
Powell Green		Franklin	North Carolina	December 27, 1919	Allegedly shot R. M. Brown, the white owner of a movie theater in Franklinton	Rope tied around neck, dragged for 2 miles (3.2 km) behind an automobile, then hanged from a pine sapling	
Herman Arthur	Paris	Lamar	Texas	July 6, 1920	Alleged fatal shootout with sharecropper landlord and son over a dispute	Herman and his little brother, Ervie, tied to a stake and burnt alive	
Wilbur Little	Blakely	Early	Georgia	Spring 1919	Refusal to remove military uniform	Beaten to death in uniform by a mob	
Leroy Johnston	Helena	Phillips	Arkansas	October 1, 1919	Was killed by a mob during the Elaine massacre, after the mob claimed they fired first.	He, along with his three brothers, were pulled off a train by a group of white men. All were shot several times and killed during a scuffle. Leroy was a bugler in the Harlem Hellfighters.	

== Contrast to White Veterans ==
The return home was not perfect for any one group of people leading to the development of the Bonus Army and many other displays of displeasement. A majority of World War I veterans believed that they had not been compensated enough for their service and they should have been taken better care of, especially in hospitals. However, there was still a major contrast in the treatment received from white and black veterans after World War I, leading to public unrest and loss of life.

White veterans received far more recognition from a national level for their bravery and sacrifice in the war. This included radio appearances, national headlines, and statues honoring their sacrifice. The population of the United states in 1919 was over 85% white and almost all major media organizations were run by white males leading to a disparity in the media attention for the entire African-American population. A monopolized media industry and racial prejudice from white Americans led to the unwillingness to consistently recognize the efforts and sacrifices of African-American veterans. In fact, out of the nearly 400,000 African Americans who served in World War I not one was rewarded with the Medal of Honor until 1991.

When veterans came back home, there were various victory parades thrown in their honor in major cities. However, because segregation was still in place there were separate parades thrown for African-American soldiers at a smaller scale. During these parades there would be several examples of civil unrest, most notable during a victory parade in Norfolk, Virginia a race riot broke out on July 21, 1919. It was not just notoriety and praise that African-American veterans were lacking. The greatest gap between white and black veterans could be seen when examining financial stability and socioeconomic status. On average, white Americans had far more resources and privileges to live at a higher quality of life.

== Aftermath ==
These lynchings were among several incidents of civil unrest that are now known as the American Red Summer of 1919. Attacks on black communities and white oppression spread to more than three dozen cities and counties. In most cases, white mobs attacked African American neighborhoods. In some cases, black community groups resisted the attacks, especially in Chicago and Washington, D.C. Most deaths occurred in rural areas during events like the Elaine massacre in Arkansas, where an estimated 100 to 240 blacks and 5 whites were killed. Other major events of Red Summer were the Chicago race riot and Washington D.C. race riot, which caused 38 and 39 deaths, respectively. Both riots had many more non-fatal injuries and extensive property damage reaching up into the millions of dollars.

African-Americans were not only plagued with racism upon return but the rising flu pandemic of 1918 as well. Due to the statically lower socioeconomic status held by many African-Americans they were more likely to contract the flu and once contracted they were worse off fighting it. Therefore, the flu pandemic devastated the African- American community and left their overall health and financial well being in shambles. This would then cause African American World War 1 veterans to communicate directly with policymakers and bureaucrats to push professional and public health advancement in the 1920s and 1930s for all black Americans.

Prior to World War I, most African Americans did not challenge the racial status quo. However, these events and unequal treatment following World War I did lead to a spark in the African American community. Following the war, emboldened by their military service and their support of the war at home through defense jobs, African Americans were determined to fight for equality. Racism and segregation are issues which plagued the African-American community for too long and they were now willing to fight against it. In fact, during the war the African American community hosted protests against segregation and discrimination, but lacked the ignition to cause real change. This change would be called the "New Negro Movement" and could be described as the radical political movement toward civil rights following World War I. Emphasized in W.E.B. Du Bois's May 1919 Crisis editorial, "Returning Soldiers," in which he famously proclaimed, "We return. We return from fighting. We return fighting." . The combination of the New Negro Movement and the Harlem Renaissance allowed African American intellectuals to secure social equality through literature. This allowed major groups, such as the NAACP, to lobby for bills which pursued equality for African Americans. Most notable was the Dyer Anti-Lynching Bill, intended to prevent lynchings in the United States, but did not pass.

Although, post World War 1 could be defined as the spark that initiated the fight against the status quo and the emergence of the New Negro Movement. The fight for equality and civil rights in the United States would become a centuries-long battle which is still taking place today. Due to this reason, similar racial violence and lynchings occurred again after African-American troops returned from service in World War 2 and African American veterans of the Cold War.

== See also ==
- Mass racial violence in the United States
- List of lynching victims in the United States
- List of incidents of civil unrest in the United States
- Sétif and Guelma massacre

== Bibliography ==
Notes

References

- The Bamberg Herald (July 31, 1919). "Newberry Negro Sought by Crowd". The Bamberg Herald. Bamberg, South Carolina: Henry S. Hartzog. pp. 1–8. ISSN 2379-4984. OCLC 13608693.
- "Soldier in Uniform is Beaten in Georgia Town". The Chicago Defender. Chicago. May 10, 1919. ISSN 0745-7014.
- "Army Uniform Cost Soldier His Life". The Chicago Defender. (Big Weekend Edition). April 5, 1919. p. 1. ProQuest 493381239.
- Clark, James (December 9, 2016). "The Tragic And Ignored History Of Black Veterans". Task & Purpose. Archived from the original on January 5, 2020.
- Griffith, Nancy Snell (February 21, 2018). "Clinton Briggs (Lynching of)". Encyclopedia of Arkansas History & Culture.
- Griffith, Nancy Snell (November 13, 2014). "Frank Livingston (Lynching of)". Encyclopedia of Arkansas History & Culture.
- Equal Justice Initiative (2019). "Lynching in America: Targeting Black Veterans". Equal Justice Initiative.
- Associated Press (September 30, 1919). "Three Negroes Are Lynched in Montgomery". The Gadsden Daily Times-News. Gadsden, Alabama: Times-News Print. Co. OCLC 12760995.
- Gilmore, Gerry J. (February 2, 2007). "African-Americans Continue Tradition of Distinguished Service". United States Army.
- The Herald and News (July 29, 1919). "Negro ex-soldier insults little white girl". The Herald and News. Vol. LV, no. 60. Newberry, South Carolina: E.H. Aull. pp. 1–8. ISSN 2333-2786. OCLC 13640295.
- James, Rawn Jr. (2013). The Double V: How Wars, Protest, and Harry Truman Desegregated America's Military. Bloomsbury Publishing USA. ISBN 978-1-60819-617-3. – Total pages: 336
- "Colored Soldier Brutally Murdered in Birmingham, Alabama". Phoenix Tribune. Phoenix, Arizona: Tribune Pub. Co. July 12, 1919. p. 4. OCLC 35642959.
- The News Scimitar (December 29, 1919). "Will offer $400 each for lynchers of Negro". The News Scimitar. Vol. 39, no. 311 (4th ed.). Memphis, Tennessee: Gilbert D. Raine. pp. 1–16. ISSN 2473-3199. OCLC 39898320.
- "For Action on Race Riot Peril". New York Times. October 5, 1919. ISSN 1553-8095. OCLC 1645522.
- Whitaker, Robert (2009). On the Laps of Gods: The Red Summer of 1919 and the Struggle for Justice That Remade a Nation. Three Rivers Press. ISBN 978-0-307-33983-6. – Total pages: 386
- Stevenson, Bryan (November 10, 2017). "Bryan Stevenson: An Unspoken History of Lynching African-American Veterans". Milwaukee Independent.
- Williams, Chad L. (2010). Torchbearers of Democracy: African American Soldiers in the World War I Era. University of North Carolina Press. ISBN 978-0-8078-9935-9. – Total pages: 472
- "Veterans Administration Master Index, 1917–1940". FamilySearch (free database with images). Searching: "Ernest Lee Coggins," August 24, 1918; citing Military Service, NARA microfilm publication 761939 (St. Louis: National Archives and Records Administration, 1985); Affiliate Film No. 41A; Digital Folder No. 105157995; Image No. 06489.
- "Texas, World War I Records, 1917–1920". FamilySearch (free database with images). Searching: "Herman Arther" (sic), April 29, 1918; citing Military Service, Mount Pleasant, Texas, Texas Military Forces Museum, Austin. OCLC 946607820.
- "Lists of Incoming Passengers, 1917–1938". (searching: "Herman Arthur") (textual records, 360 Boxes. National Archives Index "NAI:" 6234465). Records of the Office of the Quartermaster General, 1774–1985, Record Group 92. National Archives at College Park. Lists of Outgoing Passengers, 1917–1938. Textual records. 255 Boxes. NAI: 6234477. Records of the Office of the Quartermaster General, 1774–1985, Record Group 92. National Archives at College Park. (accessible via Ancestry.com, Army Transport Service, Passenger Lists, 1910–1939 [online]. Lehi, Utah).
- "How Arthur Boys Were Lynched and Three Young Sisters Raped" (PDF). New York Age. New York City. September 4, 1920. OCLC 9274417 – via fultonhistory.com.
