= James McQueen =

James McQueen may refer to:

- James McQueen (businessman) (1866–1925), American president of Sloss-Sheffield Steel & Iron Company
- James McQueen (pioneer), early 18th-century Scots-Irish Indian trader and father of Peter McQueen
- James McQueen (politician), Ontario provincial politician, 1911–1914 in the riding of Wentworth North
- James McQueen (writer) (1934–1998), Australian novelist and short-story writer

== See also ==
- James Macqueen
- James McQueen McIntosh (1828–1862), American soldier who served in the Confederate Army during the Civil War
