= Ross Gray =

Ross Gray may refer to:

- Ross F. Gray (1920–1945), American Medal of Honor recipient
- Ross Gray (politician) (1897–1968), Canadian member of Parliament
- Ross Gray (footballer) (born 1992), Scottish footballer
