= Lynching of Jim McMillan =

1919 racial violence in Alabama

Jim McMillan
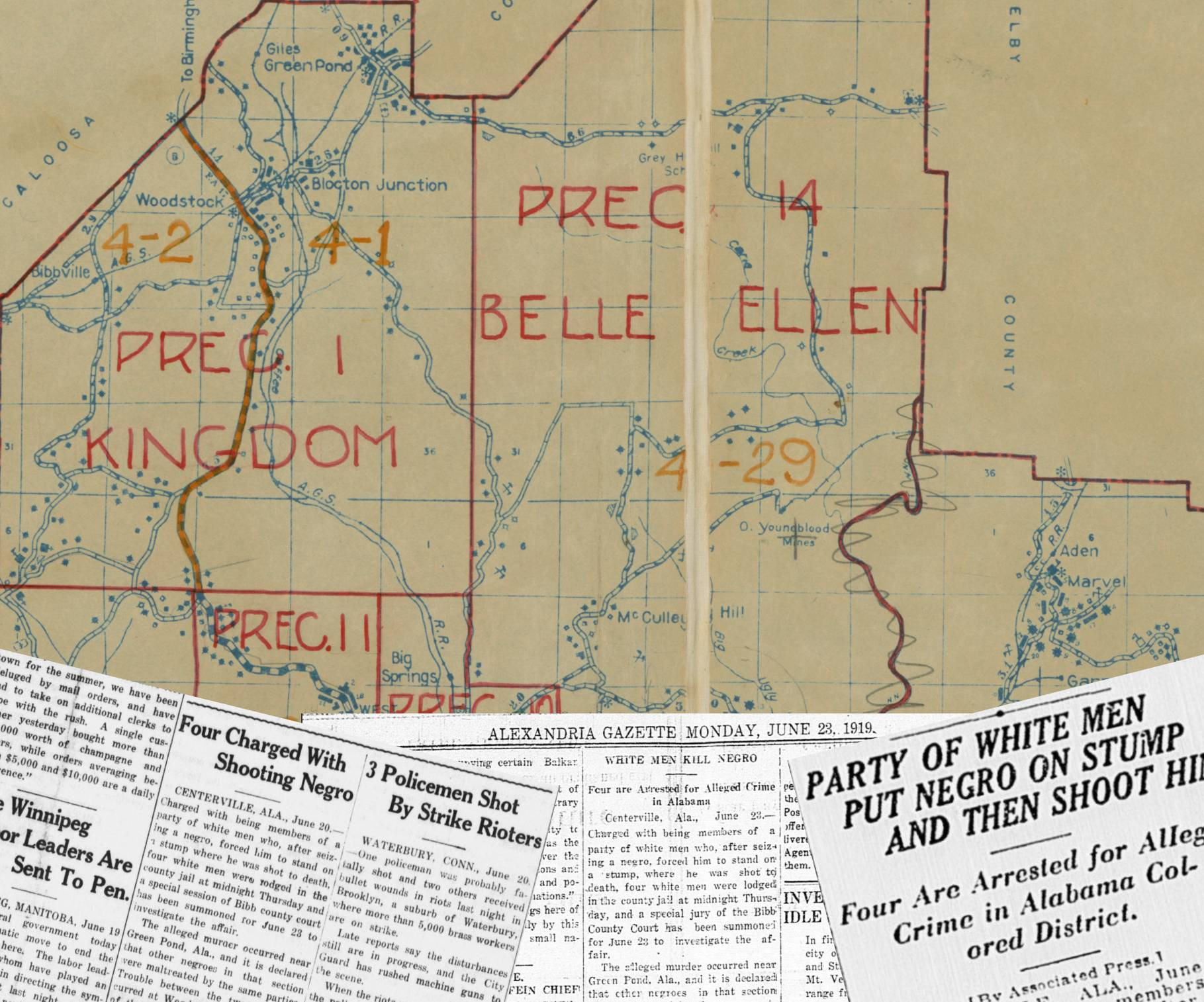
- Bibb County, Alabama Lynching Coverage
- Died: June 18, 1919; Bibb County, Alabama
- Body discovered: Bibb County, Alabama
- Known for: Lynched during America's Red Summer of 1919

Jim McMillan was lynched in Bibb County, Alabama on June 18, 1919.

== Lynching ==
Racial tension in the Woodstock and Green Pond communities of Bibb County, Alabama, worsened over the summer of 1919. Individuals terrorized the black community in northern Bibb County, around Woodstock. The events culminated in a white mob seizing Jim McMillan and taking him into the Alabama bush. He was forced onto a stump and the mob shot him to death.

== Arrests ==
Sheriff R. H. Wood arrested four Bibb County farmers in response to the lynching: J. Blankenship, James D. Oglesby, Elisha Green and Tom Russell. They were charged with murder and held in jail in Centreville, Alabama. A special grand jury was summoned by B. F. Miller. on June 23, 1919.

== Aftermath ==
These lynchings were one of several incidents of civil unrest that are now known as the American Red Summer of 1919. Attacks on black communities and white oppression spread to more than three dozen cities and counties. In most cases, white mobs attacked African American neighborhoods. In some cases, black community groups resisted the attacks, especially in Chicago and Washington, D.C. Most deaths occurred in rural areas during events like the Elaine massacre in Arkansas, where an estimated 100 to 240 blacks and 5 whites were killed. Other major events of Red Summer were the Chicago race riot and Washington, D.C. race riot, which caused 38 and 39 deaths, respectively. Both riots had many more non-fatal injuries and extensive property damage reaching up into the millions of dollars.

=== Lynchings in Alabama during 1919 ===
Date	Name	County
June 6, 1919	James E. Lewis	Mobile
June 18, 1919	Jim McMillan	Bibb
August 2, 1919	Archie Robinson	Clarke
August 2, 1919	Unnamed man	Clarke
September 29, 1919	Miles Phifer	Montgomery
September 29, 1919	Robert Croskey	Montgomery
September 30, 1919	John Temple	Montgomery

== See also ==
- Washington race riot of 1919
- Mass racial violence in the United States
- List of incidents of civil unrest in the United States

== Bibliography ==
Notes

References

- Alexandria Gazette (June 23, 1919). "White Men Kill Negro". Alexandria Gazette. Alexandria, D.C.: Edgar Snowden. pp. 1–6. ISSN 1946-6153. OCLC 11539504.
- The Atlanta Constitution (June 21, 1919). "White Men Jailed For Lynching Negro". The Atlanta Constitution. Atlanta, Georgia. pp. 1–16. ISSN 2473-1609. OCLC 8821030.
- The Chattanooga News (June 21, 1919). "Arrested For Murder". The Chattanooga News. Chattanooga, Tennessee: News Pub. Co. pp. 1–12. ISSN 2471-1977. OCLC 12703770.
- The Greeneville Daily Sun (June 21, 1919). "Four Charged With Shooting Negro". The Greeneville Daily Sun. Greeneville, Tennessee: W.R. Lyon. pp. 1–4. ISSN 2475-0174. OCLC 37307396.
- The Guardian (May 25, 2018). "America's first memorial to victims of lynching opens in Alabama – live updates". The Guardian.
- New Orleans Item (June 21, 1919). "White Men Are Arrested After Negro Is Killed". New Orleans Item. New Orleans, Louisiana: Item Co. OCLC 17291929.
- The New York Times (October 5, 1919). "For Action on Race Riot Peril". The New York Times. New York, NY. ISSN 1553-8095. OCLC 1645522.
