= Green Pond, Alabama =

Unincorporated community in Alabama, United States

- Unincorporated community
- Location within Alabama Location within the United States
- Coordinates: 33°13′30″N 87°07′35″W
- Country: United States
- State: Alabama
- County: Bibb
- Elevation: 594 ft (181 m)
- Time zone: UTC-6 (Central (CST))
  - Summer (DST): UTC-5 (CDT)
- ZIP code: 35074
- Area codes: 205, 659
- GNIS feature ID: 155084

Green Pond is an unincorporated community in Bibb County, Alabama, United States, located 1.9 miles (3.1 km) northeast of Woodstock. Green Pond has a post office with ZIP code 35074, which opened on May 22, 1872.

As the community is located about halfway between Birmingham and Tuscaloosa, many of its residents commute to one of those cities for work. Green Pond's population is not tracked by the U.S. Census, but it had an estimated population of 800 in 1983, when it considered incorporating. The Tuscaloosa News reported in 2001 that it had grown significantly in the past decade and had roughly 500 active post office boxes.
