= USS Gray =

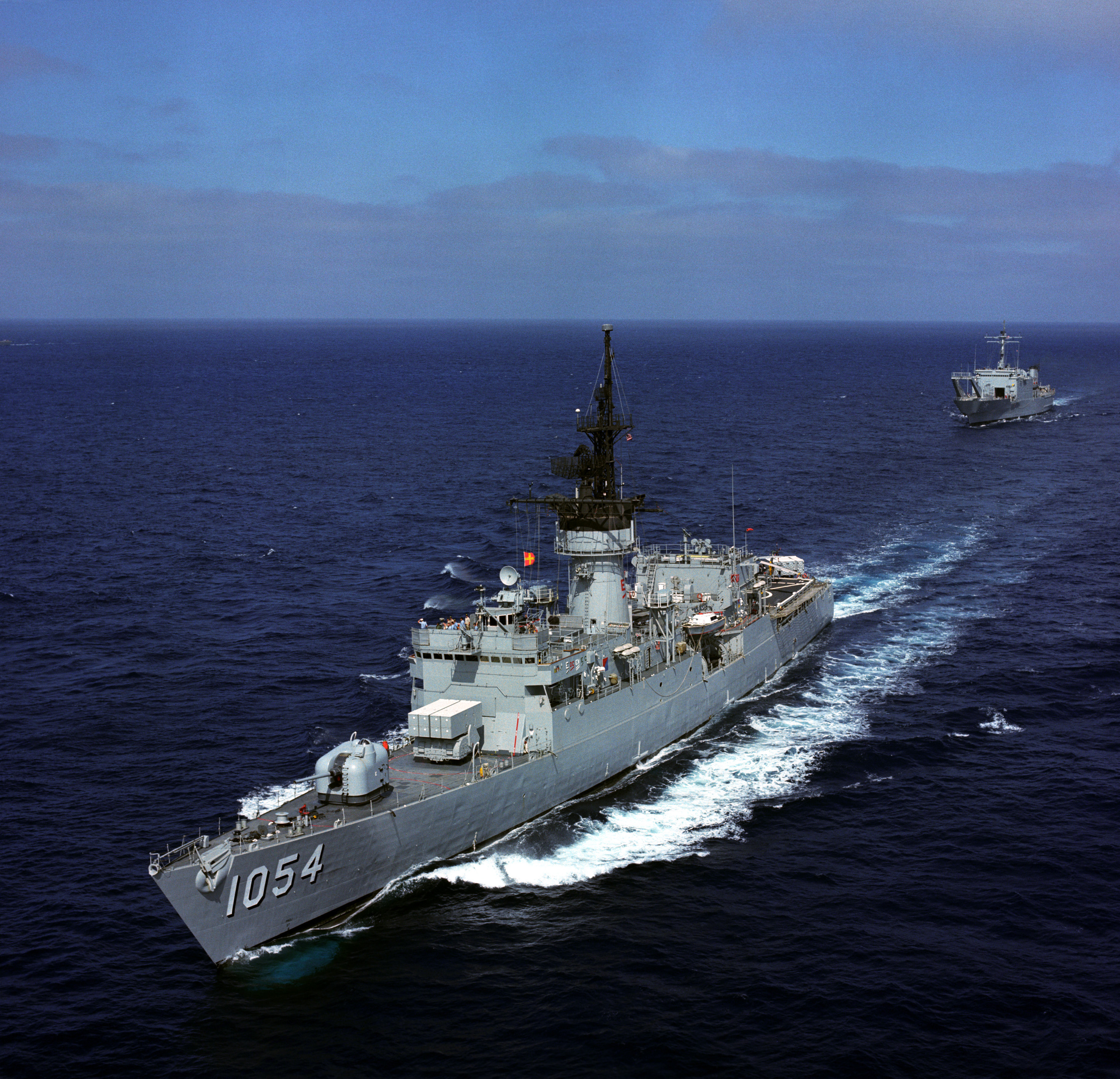
- USS Gray (FF-1054)

History

United States
- Name: Gray
- Namesake: Ross F. Gray
- Ordered: 22 July 1964
- Builder: Todd Pacific Shipyards, Seattle, Washington
- Laid down: 19 November 1966
- Launched: 3 November 1967
- Acquired: 27 March 1970
- Commissioned: 4 April 1970
- Decommissioned: 29 June 1991
- Reclassified: Reclassified as a Frigate 30 June 1975
- Stricken: 11 January 1995
- Identification: FF-1054
- Motto: Seek Engage Destroy
- Fate: Scrapped 21 July 2001

General characteristics
- Class & type: Knox-class frigate
- Displacement: 3,202 tons (4,165 full load)
- Length: 438 ft (134 m)
- Beam: 46.9 ft (14.3 m)
- Draft: 24.9 ft (7.6 m)
- Propulsion: 2 × CE 1200psi boilers; 1 Westinghouse geared turbine; 1 shaft, 35,000 shp (26 MW)
- Speed: over 27 knots (31 mph; 50 km/h)
- Range: 4,500 nautical miles (8,330 km) @ 20 knots (23 mph; 37 km/h)
- Complement: 18 officers, 267 enlisted
- Sensors & processing systems: AN/SPS-40 Air Search Radar; AN/SPS-67 Surface Search Radar; AN/SQS-26 Sonar; AN/SQR-18 Towed array sonar system; Mk68 Gun Fire Control System
- Electronic warfare & decoys: AN/SLQ-32 Electronics Warfare System
- Armament: one Mk-16 8 cell missile launcher for RUR-5 ASROC and Harpoon missiles; one Mk-42 5-inch/54 caliber gun; Mark 46 torpedoes from four single tube launchers); one Mk-25 BPDMS launcher for Sea Sparrow missiles
- Aircraft carried: one SH-2 Seasprite (LAMPS I) helicopter

USS Gray (FF-1054) was a United States Navy Knox-class frigate. She was named for Marine Corps Sergeant Ross F. Gray, who was a posthumous recipient of the Medal of Honor.

== Design and description ==
The Knox class design was derived from the Brooke-class frigate modified to extend range and without a long-range missile system. The ships had an overall length of 438 feet (133.5 m), a beam of 47 feet (14.3 m) and a draft of 25 feet (7.6 m). They displaced 4,066 long tons (4,131 t) at full load. Their crew consisted of 13 officers and 211 enlisted men.

The ships were equipped with one Westinghouse geared steam turbine that drove the single propeller shaft. The turbine was designed to produce 35,000 shaft horsepower (26,000 kW), using steam provided by 2 C-E boilers, to reach the designed speed of 27 knots (50 km/h; 31 mph). The Knox class had a range of 4,500 nautical miles (8,300 km; 5,200 mi) at a speed of 20 knots (37 km/h; 23 mph).

The Knox-class ships were armed with a 5"/54 caliber Mark 42 gun forward and a single 3-inch/50-caliber gun aft. They mounted an eight-round ASROC launcher between the 5-inch (127 mm) gun and the bridge. Close-range anti-submarine defense was provided by two twin 12.75-inch (324 mm) Mk 32 torpedo tubes. The ships were equipped with a torpedo-carrying DASH drone helicopter; its telescoping hangar and landing pad were positioned amidships aft of the mack. Beginning in the 1970s, the DASH was replaced by a SH-2 Seasprite LAMPS I helicopter and the hangar and landing deck were accordingly enlarged. Most ships also had the 3-inch (76 mm) gun replaced by an eight-cell BPDMS missile launcher in the early 1970s.

Gray carried the AN/SLQ-32 Electronic Warfare Suite. For anti-submarine work, she carried AN/SQS-26 Sonar and the AN/SQR-18 Towed array sonars. The ship also carried the AN/SPS-40 Air Search Radar and the AN/SPS-67 Surface Search Radar.

== Construction and career ==
Gray was constructed by Todd Pacific Shipyards, Seattle, Washington, laid down 19 November 1966, launched 3 November 1967 and delivered 27 March 1970. Gray was commissioned 4 April 1970, reclassified from a destroyer escort as a Frigate 30 June 1975. Gray was the third of the 46 Knox-class frigates built.

Gray served in the Surface Force of the United States Pacific Fleet. She made numerous deployments to the Western Pacific and Indian Oceans, including in support of United States Naval operations during the Vietnam War. In the early 1980s her home port was San Diego, California. In 1982 she was reassigned to the reserve fleet in Long Beach, California. In later years her home port was Naval Station Treasure Island, in San Francisco. She was decommissioned 29 June 1991, struck 11 January 1995 and scrapped 21 July 2001.

== Awards ==
- Battle "E" Ribbon
- Navy Expeditionary Medal
- National Defense Service Medal
- Armed Forces Expeditionary Medal
- Vietnam Service Medal
- Sea Service Deployment Ribbon (Multiple)
- Republic of Vietnam Campaign Medal
- Humanitarian Service Medal (Awarded for Loma Prieta Earthquake Servies, 1989
