= 1919 lynching in Montgomery, Alabama =

Lynchings in Montgomery, Alabama

- Part of Red Summer
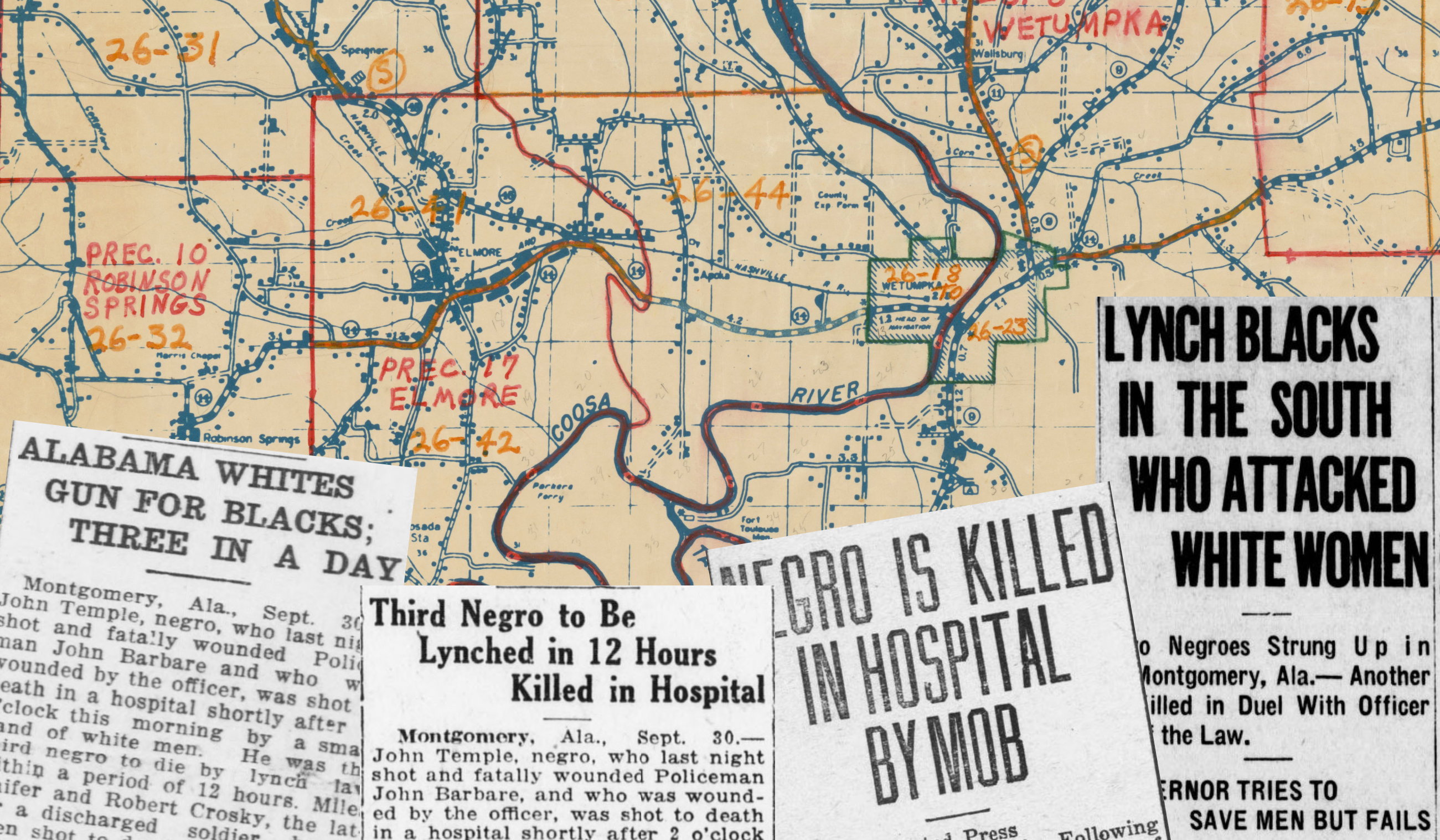
- News coverage of the lynchings in Montgomery, Alabama
- Date: September 29, 1919
- Location: Montgomery, Alabama, United States
- Deaths: 3

Miles (or Relius) Phifer and Robert Crosky were lynched in Montgomery, Alabama, for allegedly assaulting a white woman.

== Lynching of Phifer and Crosky ==
In August or September 1919 Miles Phifer and Robert Crosky, Army veterans, were arrested over allegations they assaulted two white women in separate incidents in Montgomery, Alabama. The Gadsden Daily Times-News reported that the two had confessed to the assaults. A mob had formed and a concerned citizen notified Alabama's Governor Thomas Kilby that there might be a lynching. Kilby ordered the two to be transferred to the relative safety of the prison in nearby Wetumpka. On September 29, 1919, the sheriff and his deputies were transporting Phifer and Crosky when they were stopped by a white mob of about 25 masked men. The deputies stood by as the men pulled the two out of the car. They were taken into the wilderness 5 miles (8.0 km) outside of town and told to run. As Phifer and Crosky sprinted away from the mob they were gunned down. Croskey was killed instantly, but Phifer lived for a few hours. According to some contemporary reports, both Phifer and Crosky were discharged soldiers and Phifer was still in his uniform when he was killed. Other (later) sources mention only Crosky as a veteran.

== Lynching of Willie Temple ==
On 2 AM on September 30, 1919, a day after the lynching of Phifer and Crosky, Willie Temple was lynched in a hospital for allegedly fatally wounding Policeman Barbaree.

== Aftermath ==
These lynchings were part of a period of civil unrest now known as the American Red Summer of 1919. Attacks on black communities and white oppression spread to more than three dozen cities and counties. In most cases, white mobs attacked African American neighborhoods. In some cases, black community groups resisted the attacks, especially in Chicago and Washington, D.C. Most deaths occurred in rural areas during events like the Elaine massacre in Arkansas, where an estimated 100 to 240 blacks and 5 whites were killed. Other major events of Red Summer were the Chicago race riot and Washington D.C. Race Riot, which caused 38 and 39 deaths, respectively. Both riots had many more non-fatal injuries and extensive property damage reaching up into the millions of dollars.

=== Lynchings in Alabama during 1919 ===
Date	Name	County
June 6, 1919	James E. Lewis	Mobile
June 18, 1919	Jim McMillan	Bibb
August 2, 1919	Archie Robinson	Clarke
August 2, 1919	Unnamed man	Clarke
September 29, 1919	Miles Phifer	Montgomery
September 29, 1919	Robert Croskey	Montgomery
September 30, 1919	Willie Temple	Montgomery

== See also ==
- African American veterans lynched after WWI
- Washington race riot of 1919
- Mass racial violence in the United States
- List of incidents of civil unrest in the United States

== Bibliography ==
Notes

References

- The Bridgeport Times and Evening Farmer (September 30, 1919). "Negro Shot To Death By Mob". The Bridgeport Times and Evening Farmer. Bridgeport, Fairfield, Connecticut: Farmer Pub. Co. pp. 1–16. ISSN 2381-0068. OCLC 25612160.
- Evening Capital News (September 30, 1919). "Lynch Blacks In The South Who Attacked White Women". Evening Capital News. Boise, Idaho. ISSN 2471-7754. OCLC 18530685.
- The Gadsden Daily Times-News (2019). "Three Negroes Are Lynched in Montgomery". The Gadsden Daily Times-News. Gadsden, Alabama: Times-News Print. Co. OCLC 12760995.
- The Guardian (May 25, 2018). "America's first memorial to victims of lynching opens in Alabama – live updates". The Guardian.
- The New York Times (October 5, 1919). "For Action on Race Riot Peril". The New York Times. New York, NY. ISSN 1553-8095. OCLC 1645522.
- Williams, Chad Louis (2010). Torchbearers of Democracy: African American Soldiers in the World War I Era. University of North Carolina Press. ISBN 9780807833940. - Total pages: 452
