= Lynching of Willie Temple =

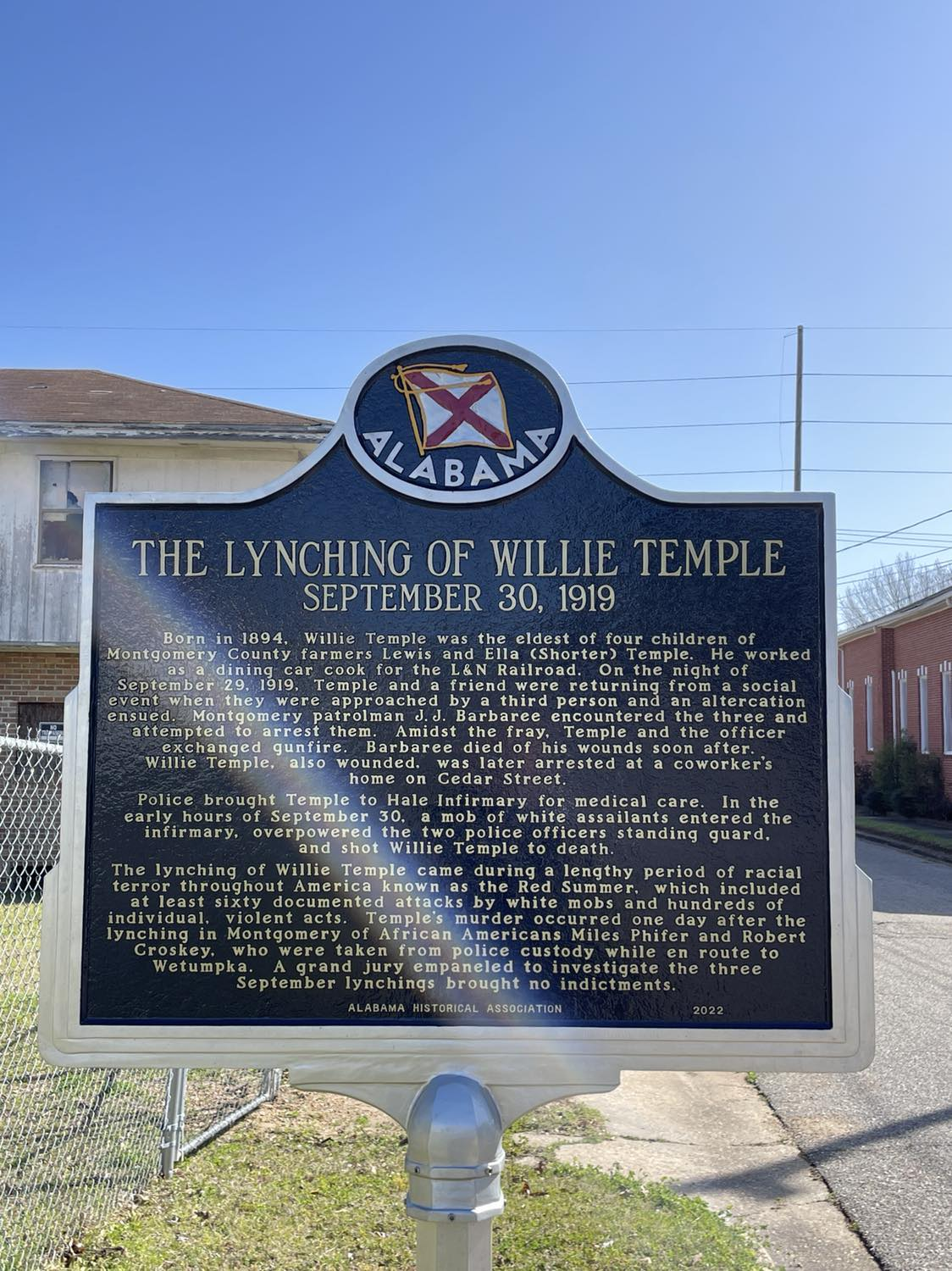
Historical marker for Willie Temple

Will or Willie Temple (also named "John") was an African American man who was lynched by a white mob on September 30, 1919, in Montgomery, Alabama.

Willie Temple was born in 1894; he was the oldest of four children. His parents, Lewis and Ella (Shorter) Temple, were farmers, and Temple worked for the Louisville and Nashville Railroad as a cook. On September 29, 1919, at night, Temple and another man came back from a dance when, after being approached by a third man, a fight broke out. A police officer named J. J. Barbaree (spelled "Barbare" in a contemporary newspaper article) tried to arrest them, and shots were fired, by Temple and Barbaree. The police officer died, and Temple, wounded, was arrested at a colleague's house. Temple was taken to Hale Infirmary, a hospital for African American citizens of Montgomery, and on the morning of September 30, just after 2AM, a white mob entered and, despite the presence of two police officers, shot him to death.

A jar with soil from the site where he was murdered is held at The Legacy Museum in Montgomery. The jar is marked "John Temple"; it was filled with soil by Vanzetta Penn McPherson, retired magistrate judge for the Middle District of Alabama, and activist Anthony Ray Hinton.

The event was one of many racist murders and riots during the so-called Red Summer of 1919. Two other men in Montgomery (both veterans of the Armed Forces) had been murdered the day before.
