= Woodstock, Alabama =

Woodstock
- Town
- Town of Woodstock
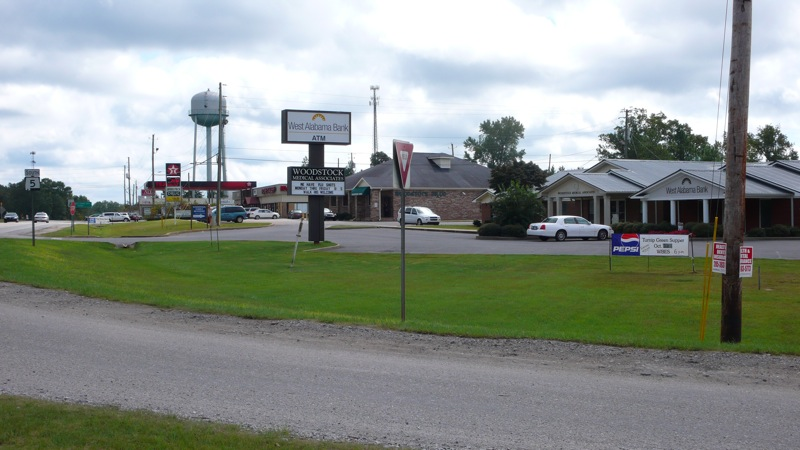
- Business at the commercial center of Woodstock

- Location of Woodstock in Bibb County and Tuscaloosa County, Alabama.
- Coordinates: 33°15′15″N 87°08′09″W
- Country: United States
- State: Alabama
- County: Bibb

Area
  - Total: 7.23 sq mi (18.72 km^{2})
  - Land: 7.08 sq mi (18.34 km^{2})
  - Water: 0.15 sq mi (0.38 km^{2})
- Elevation: 577 ft (176 m)

Population (2020)
  - Total: 1,472
  - Density: 207.8/sq mi (80.25/km^{2})
- Time zone: UTC-6 (Central (CST))
  - Summer (DST): UTC-5 (CDT)
- ZIP code: 35188
- Area codes: 205, 659
- FIPS code: 01-83640
- GNIS feature ID: 2406913
- Website: www.townofwoodstockal.com

Woodstock is a town in Bibb and Tuscaloosa counties in the U.S. state of Alabama. Formerly known as North Bibb, by referendum in August 2000, the town adopted the name of a long-established local unincorporated community and, as of October 1, 2000, is now known officially as "Woodstock". As of the 2020 census, Woodstock had a population of 1,472.

The Bibb County portion of Woodstock is part of the Birmingham metropolitan area, while the Tuscaloosa County portion is part of the Tuscaloosa metropolitan area.

== History ==
Bibb County, founded as Cahawba County in 1818, played an important role in the early industrial history of Alabama. Ironworks and foundries produced goods from the brown iron ore found on Roupes Creek. Woodstock, known as North Bibb until 2000, is a small town on the northern boundary of Bibb County. This community was once the center of a thriving railroad business.

Woodstock was first settled in the 1820s, with a formal land grant to William Houston on February 27, 1826. The settlement was established along the old Tuscaloosa to Huntsville stagecoach line. Woodstock got its name when Dr. J.U. Ray named it after the home of his ancestors, Woodstock, England. Ray's ancestors arrived in America from England at Jamestown, Virginia. In 1870, Ray built the first depot for the newly constructed Alabama-Chattanooga Railroad. After the Alabama Great Southern Railroad came the Louisville and Nashville Railroad. Each operated a depot in the area. In 1872, a line was installed down to West Blocton to ship the large abundance of coal found in the area. Woodstock became a break and storage yard for coal, red and brown iron ore and cotton. After the Civil War, rich iron ore deposits were mined. In 1872, Giles Edwards relocated to Woodstock from Tannehill and built a blast furnace to manufacture pig iron.

Edwards was later joined in the business by his son-in-law, James W. McQueen, who went on to become the president of Sloss-Sheffield Iron Company in Birmingham. In addition to the iron ore mining, coal mining, and farming, a jug factory was built to take advantage of the large deposits of fire clay that was in the area. The clay was used to make bricks, jugs, pots, and churns. As many as eight trains per day stopped in Woodstock, carrying away its riches, six of them carrying mail. On June 18, 1919, Jim McMillan was lynched by a White mob.

Woodstock was also the roots of a newspaper business in the 1800s. This publication moved to Six Mile and then to Birmingham where it became The Birmingham News. Woodstock was incorporated in 1996 as the Town of North Bibb, with Carl Jones as mayor. Woodstock changed its name back to Woodstock by Ordinance 2008-08-03, effective October 1, 2000, S.B. Albert Hutchens, Mayor.

== Geography ==
Woodstock is located in northern Bibb County. A portion of the town extends to the northwest into Tuscaloosa County. U.S. Route 11 passes northwest of the town center, leading northeast 31 miles (50 km) to downtown Birmingham and west 26 miles (42 km) to Tuscaloosa. Interstate 59 passes northwest of Woodstock, with the closest access via Exit 97 north of town.

According to the U.S. Census Bureau, the town has a total area of 7.2 square miles (18.7 km^{2}), of which 7.1 square miles (18.3 km^{2}) is land and 0.15 square miles (0.4 km^{2}), or 2.11%, is water.

== Demographics ==
Historical population
Census	Pop.	Note	%±
2000	986		—
2010	1,428		44.8%
2020	1,472		3.1%
U.S. Decennial Census; 2013 Estimate

=== 2020 census ===
Woodstock racial composition
Race	Num.	Perc.
White (non-Hispanic)	1,332	90.49%
Black or African American (non-Hispanic)	38	2.58%
Native American	3	0.2%
Asian	2	0.14%
Pacific Islander	1	0.07%
Other/Mixed	42	2.85%
Hispanic or Latino	54	3.67%

As of the 2020 census, Woodstock had a population of 1,472. The median age was 35.5 years. 26.9% of residents were under the age of 18 and 12.5% of residents were 65 years of age or older. For every 100 females there were 95.7 males, and for every 100 females age 18 and over there were 90.1 males age 18 and over.

0.0% of residents lived in urban areas, while 100.0% lived in rural areas.

There were 524 households in Woodstock, of which 42.7% had children under the age of 18 living in them. Of all households, 53.8% were married-couple households, 14.5% were households with a male householder and no spouse or partner present, and 24.2% were households with a female householder and no spouse or partner present. About 16.6% of all households were made up of individuals and 6.5% had someone living alone who was 65 years of age or older.

There were 580 housing units, of which 9.7% were vacant. The homeowner vacancy rate was 0.0% and the rental vacancy rate was 6.3%.

=== 2010 census ===
As of the census of 2010, there were 1,428 people, 507 households, and 395 families residing in the town. The population density was 202 inhabitants per square mile (78/km^{2}). There were 549 housing units at an average density of 76.3 per square mile (29.5/km^{2}). The racial makeup of the town was 93% White, 3.4% Black, and 1.0% from two or more races. 2.1% of the population were Hispanic or Latino of any race.

There were 507 households, out of which 34.3% had children under the age of 18 living with them, 61.9% were married couples living together, 10.3% had a female householder with no husband present, and 22.1% were non-families. 16.8% of all households were made up of individuals, and 5.5% had someone living alone who was 65 years of age or older. The average household size was 2.79 and the average family size was 3.13.

In the town, the population was spread out, with 26.9% under the age of 18, 8.3% from 18 to 24, 29.3% from 25 to 44, 25.4% from 45 to 64, and 10.1% who were 65 years of age or older. The median age was 35.7 years. For every 100 females, there were 100.6 males. For every 100 females age 18 and over, there were 100.4 males.

The median income for a household in the town was $48,750, and the median income for a family was $52,417. Males had a median income of $42,500 versus $32,885 for females. The per capita income for the town was $20,855. About 8.0% of families and 9.2% of the population were below the poverty line, including 8.7% of those under age 18 and 5.9% of those age 65 or over.

== Notable person ==
- Ross F. Gray, (August 1, 1920 – February 27, 1945) United States Marine who posthumously received the Medal of Honor.

== Culture ==
The podcast S-Town, from This American Life, is set and recorded in Woodstock.

== See also ==
- Anniston, Alabama
