= Lynching of Wilbur Little =

1919 hate crime in Georgia, United States

Map of Blakely on a map of Early County (left) and Georgia (right)

Wilbur Little (also William or Wilbert in some sources) was a black American veteran of World War I, lynched in April 1919 in his hometown of Blakely, Georgia, for refusing to remove his military uniform. Servicemen who had been discharged from the army were permitted under War Department regulations to wear their service uniforms for three months after their demobilization date. Reportedly, Little was still in uniform beyond that date. He was one of many African-American servicemen of the time who were subjected to violence for continuing to wear their uniforms after being discharged from the military.

Little was killed by Blakely residents, but the details of his death are uncertain. One source says he was hanged and burned. Another states he was beaten to death. The lack of authoritative information about these types of killings was not uncommon.

== Lynching ==
Little returned to Blakely wearing his military uniform, and was seen at the train station by a group of white men, who demanded he remove the uniform. He was threatened with arrest but, lacking civilian clothes, was allowed to return to his home in uniform. According to historian Isabel Wilkerson:

Soon anonymous notes were warning him to leave town if he wanted to wear his uniform. Days later, a mob attacked him as he greeted friends congratulating him on his achievements. He was found beaten to death on the outskirts of town. He was wearing his uniform. He had survived the war only to be killed at home.

The lynching of Little was memorialized by poet Carrie Williams Clifford in "The Black Draftee from Georgia" (1922):

What though the hero-warrior was black?
His heart was white and loyal to the core;
And when to his loved Dixie he came back,
Maimed, in the duty done on foreign shore,
Where from the hell of war he never flinched,
Because he cried, 'Democracy,' was lynched.

== Claims of hoax ==
The story of Little's death appeared in the April 5, 1919 Chicago Defender. In May of that year, a number of other papers ran reports that the lynching was a hoax. Most notably, Blakely's Early County News published editorials on May 15 and 29. The latter asserted that "No negro has been lynched in this county because he refused to take off his soldier uniform" and that Little was still alive and employed on a farm. On May 24, the editor of the News, W. W. Fleming, wrote a letter to the New York Sun, again denying the lynching had occurred, and objecting to a letter run by The Sun several days earlier.

The Kingston Daily Freeman (May 8), the Winston-Salem Journal (May 13), the Raleigh News and Observer (May 15), and the Taylor Daily Press (May 19) all ran variations of a story questioning the accuracy of an April 20 report in the Philadelphia Public Ledger. (Note: The date is likely incorrect. April 20, 1919 was a Sunday; the Philadelphia Public Ledger was not published on Sundays. "Library of Congress: Chronicling America collection".) Assertions were made that the original reports erroneously mixed up the lynching of Little with another murder, that of Clifford Hughes.

=== Investigation by the NAACP ===
A month after the article appeared in the Chicago Defender the NAACP sent Monroe N. Work to Blakely to investigate the incident. On June 7, 1919, Work sent a telegram to NAACP officer J. R. Shillady stating "Have investigated report. Blakely, Georgia, lynching does not appear to have occurred." Work concluded his investigation by recommending that allegations of a lynching be dropped. The denial by the Early County Times and the subsequent investigation by Work led the NAACP to delay publication of the Wilbur Little story. However, the organization eventually rejected the recommendation of their investigator, publishing the story in The Crisis three months later.

== See also ==
- African-American veterans lynched after World War I
- List of lynching victims in the United States
- New Negro
