= Dr. A.M. Brown House =

Historic house in Alabama, United States

- Dr. A. M. Brown House
- U.S. National Register of Historic Places
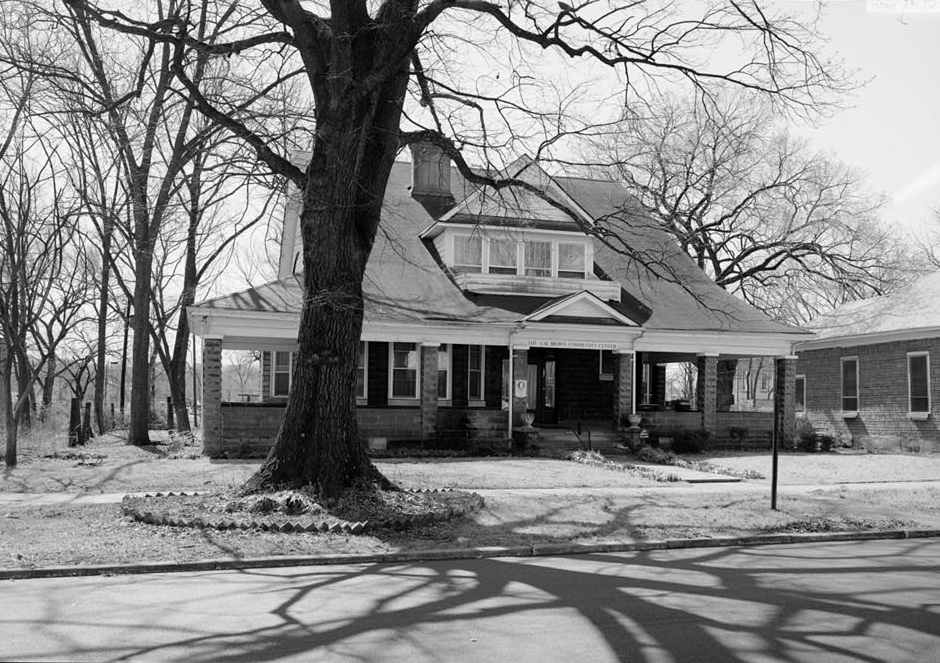
- The A.M. Brown House in 1993

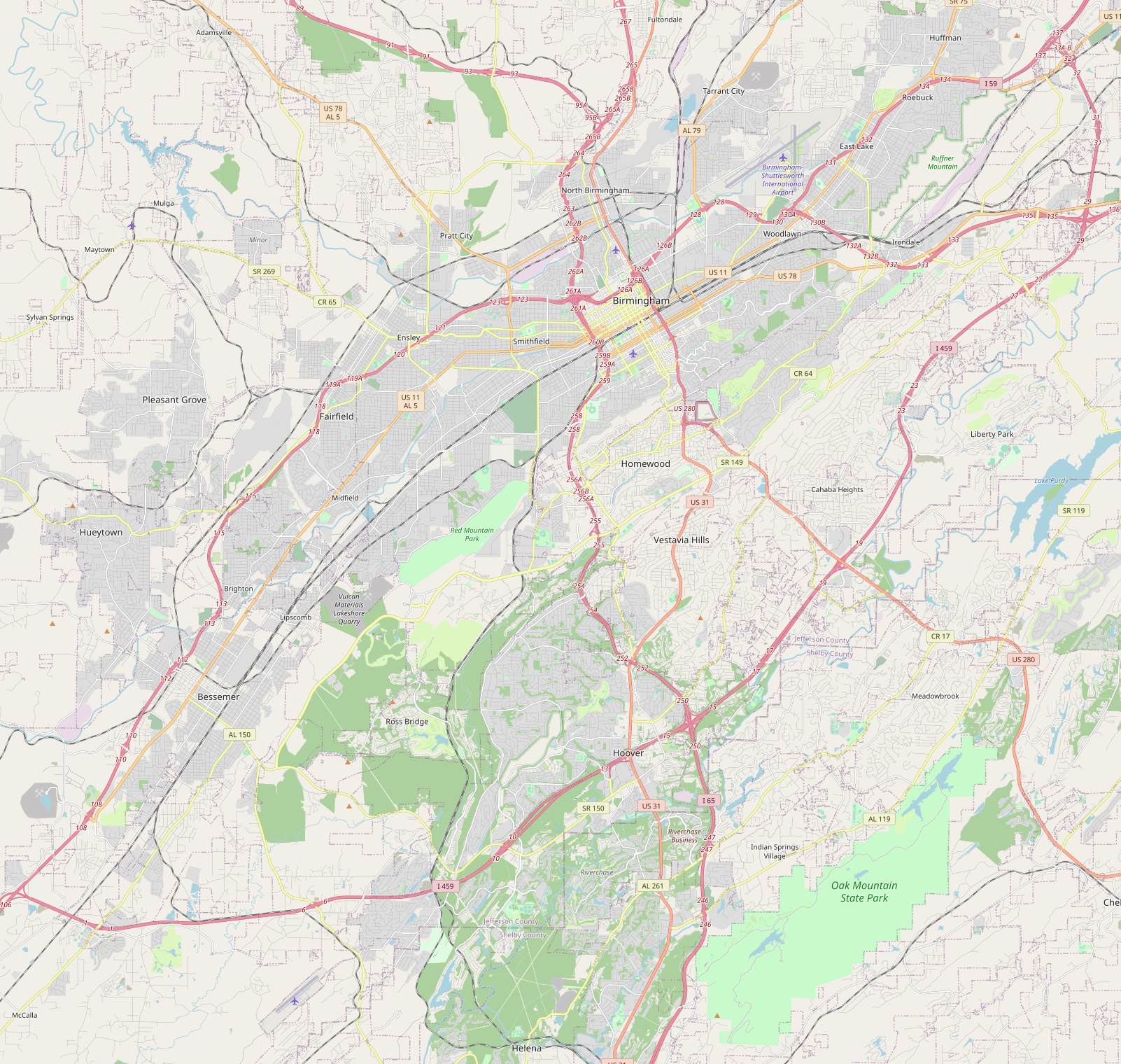
- Location within Birmingham, Alabama Location within Alabama Location within the United States
- Location: 319 N. 4th Ter., Birmingham, Alabama
- Coordinates: 33°30′34″N 86°49′51″W
- Area: 1 acre (0.40 ha)
- Built: 1908
- Architect: W.A. Rayfield
- Architectural style: Bungalow/craftsman
- NRHP reference No.: 74000413
- Added to NRHP: June 20, 1974

The Dr. A.M. Brown House is a house in Birmingham, Alabama, built c. 1908. It was designed by W.A. Rayfield, one of the first African-American architects in Alabama for Dr. Arthur McKinnon Brown, one of the first African-American physicians in Birmingham.

The house is a 1 1/2-story bungalow-style building with a deep porch across the front and sides supported by rusticated concrete block pillars. The ground floor walls are constructed in a similar fashion. A broad front dormer has a balcony projecting forward with a small pediment over the entrance.

The Brown House was placed on the National Register of Historic Places on June 20, 1974.
