= Glenwood Cemetery (Huntsville, Alabama) =

Historic African American cemetery in Huntsville, Alabama

- Interactive map of Glenwood Cemetery

Details
- Established: c. 1870
- Location: Hall Avenue, Huntsville, Alabama
- Country: United States
- Coordinates: 34°43′34″N 86°36′08″W
- Size: approximately 10 acres (4.0 ha)
- No. of interments: 8,000 to 10,000
- Find a Grave: Glenwood Cemetery

Glenwood Cemetery, formerly Georgia Cemetery, is a historic cemetery for African American burials founded in c. 1870 on Hall Avenue in Huntsville, Alabama. Burials include veterans, local politicians, and community leaders.

== History ==
Established about 1870, Glenwood Cemetery succeeded a burial ground for enslaved African Americans which was north of where a hospital is now and covered by a parking lot. Recognized as a site of historical significance, a historical marker commemorates its history. A local teacher and her students have helped catalogue some of its history. About 10 acres in size, the cemetery is believed to hold between 8,000 and 10,000 burial sites. Many of them are unmarked.

The cemetery and a headstone for Burgess E. Scruggs, the first licensed doctor in Alabama has been added to the Alabama State Historic Cemetery Register. The Glenwood Cemetery became part of the African American Civil Rights Network in February 2021, and was listed on the National Register of Historic Places in 2023.
