= Hale Infirmary =

Hospital in Montgomery founded in 1890

Coordinates: 32°22′12.9″N 86°17′32.6″W

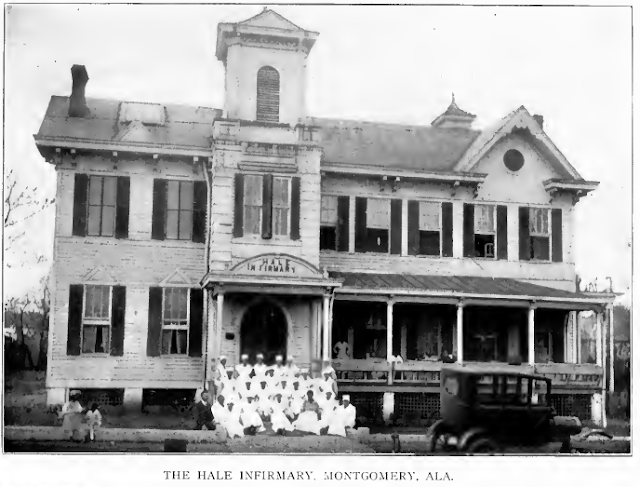
B/w photograph of Hale Infirmary, with staff, in Montgomery, Alabama, 1919

Hale Infirmary (also Hale's Infirmary) was a hospital in Montgomery, Alabama, for African American citizens during a time of segregation. It was the first such hospital in the city; founded in 1890 by Dr. Cornelius Nathaniel Dorsette, it was in operation until 1958.

The hospital was founded during the Black Hospital Movement, a nation-wide development of efforts that aimed to provide better medical care to Black citizens as well as training opportunities for doctors and nurses of color. At the time, there were 25 such hospitals in Alabama, and Hale's was the first in Montgomery. Its founder, Cornelius Nathaniel Dorsette (1852? - 1897), had graduated from Hampton University in Virginia and from the medical school at the University of Buffalo (where he was the second Black graduate). In 1883, Booker T. Washington (his classmate at Hampton) had asked him to come to Montgomery, and he was one of the first Black doctors to be licensed in the state. He became the personal doctor to Washington. He also ran a pharmacy and had an office on Dexter Avenue, where he had a three-story office building built for him.

Dorsette's father-in-law, James Hale, was the richest Black man in Montgomery. He donated the land for the hospital, and money was raised for the building by a white women's social organization. The hospital was a two-story building with sixty beds, an operating room, and an isolation ward. It cost $7,000 to build, had plumbing throughout and bathrooms for men and women with hot and cold running water.

Halle Tanner Dillon Johnson, the first woman licensed to practice medicine in the state, was tutored in Hale Infirmary. In 1919, the lynching of Willie Temple took place in the hospital: he was murdered by a white mob while being treated for a gunshot wound. Later, Martin Luther King Jr. helped raise funds for the hospital. David Henry Scott, a doctor from Montgomery who had studied medicine at Meharry Medical College in Nashville, operated at the hospital, and for a while was the head of the hospital.
