= Ross F. Gray =

US Marine Corps Medal of Honor recipient (1920–1945)

Ross Franklin Gray
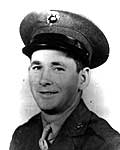
- Ross F. Gray, Medal of Honor recipient
- Born: August 1, 1920; Marvel Valley, Alabama
- Died: February 27, 1945 (aged 24); Iwo Jima, Volcano Islands, Japanese Empire
- Burial place: initially 4th Marine Division Cemetery, Iwo Jima later Ada Chapel Baptist Church, Woodstock, Alabama
- Military career
- Allegiance: United States of America
- Branch: United States Marine Corps
- Service years: 1942–1945
- Rank: Sergeant
- Nickname: "The Deacon"
- Units: Company A, 1st Battalion, 25th Marines, 4th Marine Division
- Conflicts: World War II: Battle of Kwajalein; Battle of Saipan; Battle of Tinian; Battle of Iwo Jima †
- Awards: Medal of Honor (1945); Purple Heart

Sergeant Ross Franklin Gray (August 1, 1920 – February 27, 1945) was a United States Marine who posthumously received the Medal of Honor – the highest military honor of the United States – for his heroic service in the Battle of Iwo Jima during World War II, having single-handedly disarmed an entire mine field while under heavy enemy fire. He was killed in action six days later.

== Early years ==
Ross Franklin Gray was born in Marvel Valley, Alabama. He attended the elementary schools of Bibb County and went on to Centreville High School, which he left in 1939 after three years in attendance.

He went to work for his father as a carpenter. He had already worked at that trade part-time for three years and now worked another three years before he enlisted in the Marine Corps Reserve. He played football and basketball at Centreville High and enjoyed hunting and fishing. He was a devout Protestant; his comrades in the Marine Corps called him "The Deacon."

== Marine Corps service ==
Gray enlisted in the Marine Corps Reserve in Birmingham, Alabama on July 22, 1942, and was assigned to active duty the same day. After receiving his recruit training at Parris Island, South Carolina, he went to New River, North Carolina, and in September joined the 23rd Marines, 4th Marine Division. Promoted to private first class in April 1943, he was transferred to Company A, 1st Battalion 25th Marines, a month later.

Private First Class Gray left for overseas duty on January 13, 1944, and landed at Kwajalein in the Marshall Islands where he took part in the Roi-Namur campaign. He was made an engineering corporal in March and in June made another assault landing – this time at Saipan. At the conclusion of the fighting at Saipan, Cpl Gray took part in the landing on Tinian Island, also in the Marianas.

Promoted to sergeant in August, he attended the 4th Marine Division Mine and Booby Trap School, upon completion of which he was rated qualified to instruct troops in the laying of mine fields; the reconnaissance of enemy minefields, day and night; the location, neutralization, disarming, and removal of mines; the neutralization of booby-trapped mines; and the day and night clearance of lanes through minefields. Examined and found qualified for promotion to the rank of staff sergeant, Sgt Gray, due to the lack of openings for that rate in his organization, was never promoted to the third pay grade.

On February 21, 1945, two days after D-Day on Iwo Jima, Sgt Gray was acting platoon sergeant of one of Company A's platoons which had been held up by a sudden barrage of Japanese hand grenades in the area northeast of Airfield No. 1. Promptly withdrawing his platoon out of range of the grenades, he moved forward to reconnoiter. He ascertained that the advance was held up by a series of enemy emplacements connected by covered communication trenches and fronted by a mine field.

Through a hail of enemy small arms fire, Sgt Gray cleared a path through the mine field up to the mouth of one of the fortifications, then returned to his own lines, where with three volunteers, he went back to the battalion dump and acquired twelve satchel charges. Placing these in a defiladed area within his platoon that was protected from immediate enemy fire, he took one weighing twenty-four pounds. Under covering fire from the three volunteers, Sgt Gray advanced up the path he had cleared and threw the charge into the enemy position in order to neutralize it.

Immediately brought under fire from a machine gun in another opening of the same position, Sgt Gray returned to the defiladed spot, obtained another charge, returned to the position and this time completely destroyed it. Spotting another emplacement, he went through the mine field for the seventh and eighth time to get another charge and destroy another enemy stronghold.

He continued this one-man attack, all the time under heavy small arms fire and grenade barrage, until he had destroyed six enemy positions. At one time a Japanese grenade landed so close to him that it blew his helmet off. Throughout, he went unarmed so that he could more easily carry the charges and accessories.

When he had eliminated the six positions, Sgt Gray disarmed the whole mine field before returning to his platoon.

Although he remained unscratched through his twelve trips back and forth among enemy mines, constantly under heavy fire, Sgt Gray was killed six days later, on February 27, 1945, by an enemy shell which inflicted fatal wounds in his legs.

For his personal valor, daring tactics, and tenacious perseverance in the face of extreme peril on February 21, Sgt Gray was posthumously awarded the Medal of Honor by President Harry S. Truman.

The revered award was presented to the hero's father by Rear Admiral A. S. Merrill, United States Navy, then Commandant of the Eighth Naval District, at the football field at Centreville High School in the presence of the Governor of the State of Alabama, Chauncey Sparks, on April 16, 1946.

Sergeant Gray was initially buried in the 4th Marine Division Cemetery on Iwo Jima, but later his remains were returned to the United States for private burial in Woodstock, Alabama.

== Medal of Honor citation ==
The President of the United States takes pride in presenting in the MEDAL OF HONOR posthumously to

SERGEANT ROSS F. GRAY
UNITED STATES MARINE CORPS RESERVE

for service as set forth in the following CITATION:

For conspicuous gallantry and intrepidity at the risk of his life above and beyond the call of duty as Acting Platoon Sergeant serving with Company A, First Battalion, Twenty-Fifth Marines, Fourth Marine Division, in action against enemy Japanese forces on Iwo Jima, Volcano Islands, February 21, 1945. Shrewdly gauging the tactical situation when his platoon was held up by a sudden barrage of hostile grenades while advancing toward the high ground northeast of Airfield Number One, Sergeant Gray promptly organized the withdrawal of his men from enemy grenade range, quickly moved forward alone to reconnoiter and discovered a heavily mined area extending along the front of a strong network of emplacements joined by covered communication trenches. Although assailed by furious gunfire, he cleared a path leading through the mine field to one of the fortifications then returned to the platoon position and, informing his leader of the serious situation, volunteered to initiate an attack while being covered by three fellow Marines. Alone and unarmed but carrying a twenty-four pound satchel charge, he crept up the Japanese emplacement, boldly hurled the short-fused explosive and sealed the entrance. Instantly taken under machine-gun fire from a second entrance to the same position, he unhesitatingly braved the increasingly vicious fusillades to crawl back for another charge, returned to his objective and blasted the second opening, thereby demolishing the position. Repeatedly covering the ground between the savagely defended enemy fortifications and his platoon area, he systematically approached, attacked and withdrew under blanketing fire to destroy a total of six Japanese positions, more than twenty-five of the enemy and a quantity of vital ordnance gear and ammunition. Stouthearted and indomitable, Sergeant Gray had single-handedly overcome a strong enemy garrison and had completely disarmed a large mine field before finally rejoining his unit and, by his great personal valor, daring tactics and tenacious perseverance in the face of extreme peril, had contributed materially to the fulfillment of his company's mission. His gallant conduct throughout enhanced and sustained the highest traditions of the United States Naval Service.

/S/ HARRY S. TRUMAN

== Awards and decorations ==

1st row	Medal of Honor		Purple Heart
2nd row	Combat Action Ribbon	Presidential Unit Citation	Navy Unit Commendation
3rd row	American Campaign Medal	Asiatic-Pacific Campaign Medal with four campaign stars	World War II Victory Medal

== Other recognition ==
The frigate USS Gray (FF-1054) was named for Sergeant Gray.

== See also ==
- List of Medal of Honor recipients
- List of Medal of Honor recipients for World War II
- List of Medal of Honor recipients for the Battle of Iwo Jima
