= Blakely, Georgia =

- City
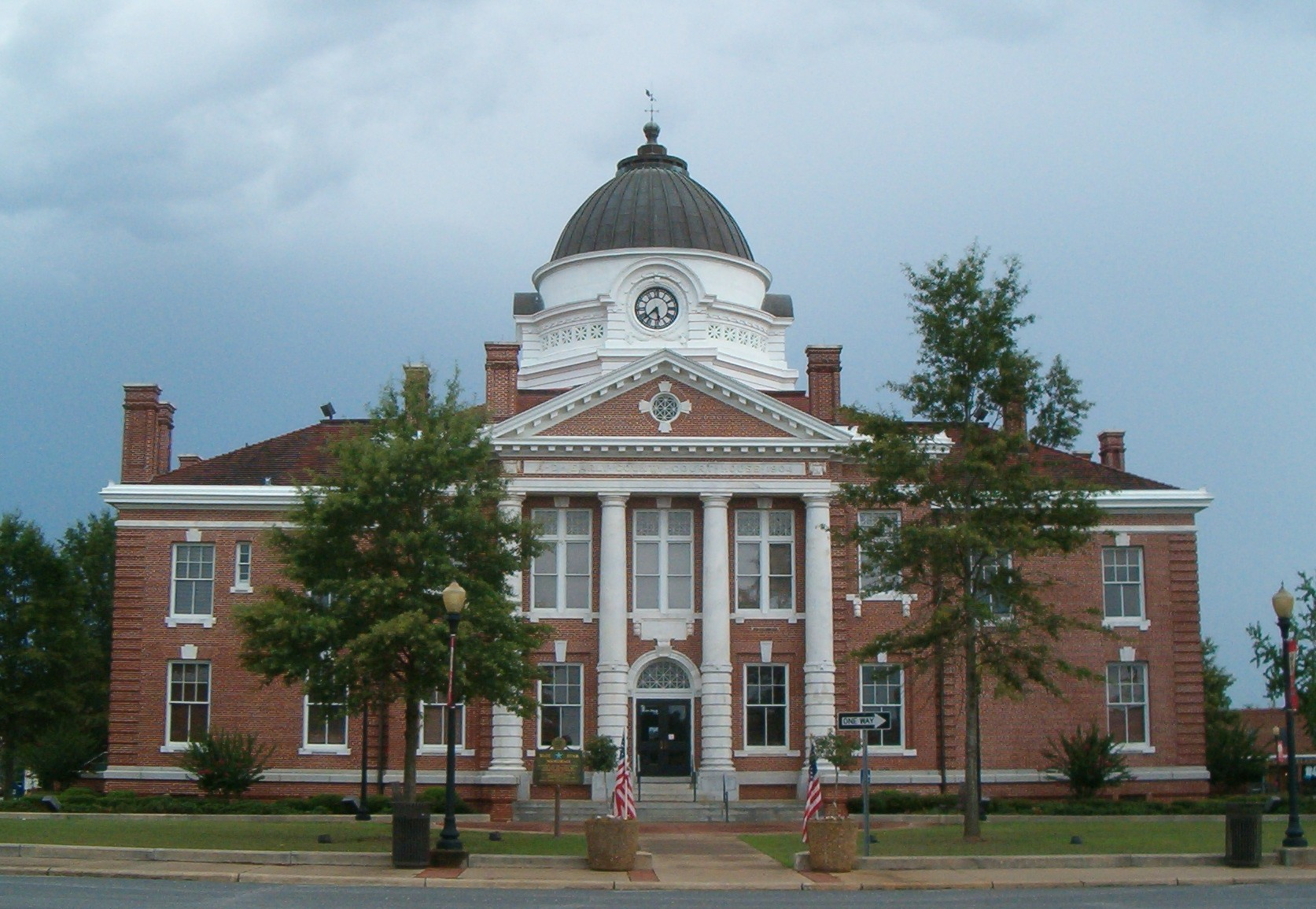
- Early County Courthouse in Blakely
- Nickname: Peanut Capital of the World
- Location in Early County and the state of Georgia
- Coordinates: 31°22′36″N 84°56′2″W
- Country: United States
- State: Georgia
- County: Early

Government
  - Mayor: Travis Wimbush

Area
  - Total: 17.66 sq mi (45.75 km^{2})
  - Land: 17.55 sq mi (45.46 km^{2})
  - Water: 0.11 sq mi (0.29 km^{2})
- Elevation: 260 ft (80 m)

Population (2020)
  - Total: 5,371
  - Density: 306.0/sq mi (118.15/km^{2})
- Time zone: UTC-5 (Eastern (EST))
  - Summer (DST): UTC-4 (EDT)
- ZIP codes: 39823
- Area code: 229
- FIPS code: 13-08536
- GNIS feature ID: 0331185
- Website: cityofblakely.net

Blakely is a city in and the county seat of Early County, Georgia, United States. As of 2020, its population was 5,371. It is located approximately halfway between Columbus and Tallahassee, Florida on U.S. Route 27.

== History ==
Blakely was platted in 1825 as the county seat for Early County. It was named for Johnston Blakeley, an officer in the War of 1812. Between 1881 and 1947 at least seven African-Americans were lynched in Blakely, including at least two veterans. One of these, Wilbur Little, was murdered upon returning from service in World War I by whites who detested seeing a black person in uniform. In 1960 an African-American veteran from New Jersey who was traveling through the county was convicted of rape and sentenced to death three days after his arrest in a trial that featured no defense counsel and no jury. The story was chronicled in the movie Fair Game.A month after the article appeared in the Chicago Defender the NAACP sent Monroe N. Work to Blakely to investigate the incident. On June 7, 1919, Work sent a telegram to NAACP officer J.R. Shillady stating "Have investigated report. Blakely, Georgia, lynching does not appear to have occurred [sic]." Work concluded his investigation by recommending that allegations of a lynching be dropped. However, further review by the organization found that it had in fact occurred.

== Geography ==
Blakely is located at 31°22′36″N 84°56′2″W (31.376728, -84.933873). The city is located in southwestern Georgia along U.S. Route 27, Georgia State Route 62, and Georgia State Route 39. Blakely is located approximately 75 mi (121 km) south of Columbus, 48 mi (77 km) southwest of Albany, 76 mi (122 km) northwest of Tallahassee, Florida and 24 miles northeast of Dothan, Alabama.

According to the United States Census Bureau, this town has a total area of 17.6 square miles (46 km^{2}), of which 17.5 square miles (45 km^{2}) is land and 0.1 square miles (0.26 km^{2}) (0.74%) is water.

== Demographics ==
Historical population
Census	Pop.	Note	%±
1880	279		—
1890	441		58.1%
1900	804		82.3%
1910	1,838		128.6%
1920	1,985		8.0%
1930	2,106		6.1%
1940	2,774		31.7%
1950	3,234		16.6%
1960	3,580		10.7%
1970	5,267		47.1%
1980	5,880		11.6%
1990	5,595		−4.8%
2000	5,696		1.8%
2010	5,068		−11.0%
2020	5,371		6.0%
U.S. Decennial Census; 1850-1870 1870-1880; 1890-1910 1920-1930; 1940 1950 1960; 1970 1980 1990; 2000 2010

=== 2020 census ===
As of the 2020 census, Blakely had a population of 5,371. The median age was 36.7 years. 27.6% of residents were under the age of 18 and 17.0% of residents were 65 years of age or older. For every 100 females there were 81.3 males, and for every 100 females age 18 and over there were 76.1 males age 18 and over.

0.0% of residents lived in urban areas, while 100.0% lived in rural areas.

As of the 2020 census, there were 1,584 households and 1,065 families residing in the city.

Of all households, 37.2% had children under the age of 18 living in them. Of all households, 29.3% were married-couple households, 15.5% were households with a male householder and no spouse or partner present, and 48.1% were households with a female householder and no spouse or partner present. About 27.6% of all households were made up of individuals and 13.5% had someone living alone who was 65 years of age or older.

There were 2,199 housing units, of which 8.7% were vacant. The homeowner vacancy rate was 2.6% and the rental vacancy rate was 3.5%.

Blakely racial composition as of 2020
Race	Num.	Perc.
White (non-Hispanic)	1,444	26.89%
Black or African American (non-Hispanic)	3,706	69.0%
Native American	12	0.22%
Asian	32	0.6%
Other/Mixed	113	2.1%
Hispanic or Latino	64	1.19%

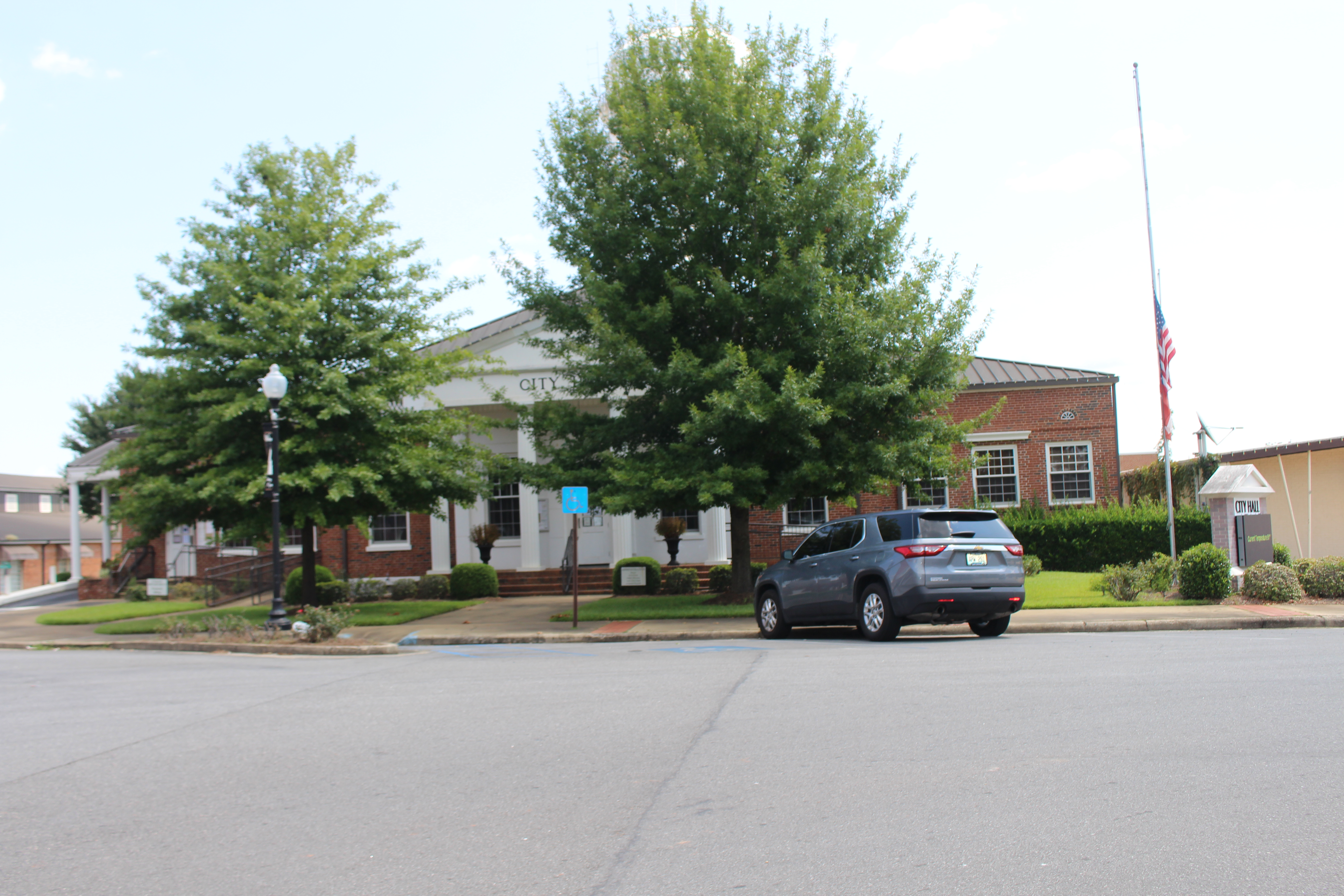
Blakely City Hall

== Education ==
=== Early County School District ===
The Early County School District holds grades pre-school to grade twelve, and consists of one elementary school, a middle school, and a high school. The district has 156 full-time teachers and over 2,764 students.

- Early County Elementary School
- Early County Middle School
- Early County High School

=== Alternative School ===
- Learning and Opportunity Academy
