= Halle Tanner Dillon Johnson =

American physician (1864–1901)

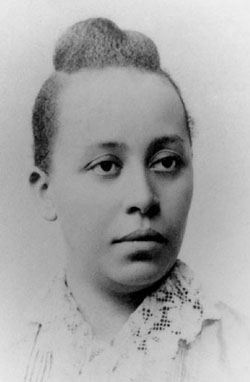
- Born: Halle Tanner; October 17, 1864; Pittsburgh, Pennsylvania, US
- Died: April 26, 1901 (aged 36); Nashville, Tennessee, US
- Resting place: Greenwood Cemetery (Nashville, Tennessee)
- Education: Woman's Medical College of Pennsylvania
- Occupation: Physician
- Known for: The first woman licensed as a physician in the state of Alabama
- Relatives: Henry Ossawa Tanner (brother); Sadie Tanner Mossell Alexander (niece)
- Scientific career
- Fields: General medicine
- Workplaces: Tuskegee Institute

Halle Tanner Dillon Johnson (October 17, 1864 – April 26, 1901) was an American physician and the first woman to be licensed as a physician in the U.S. state of Alabama.

== Early life and education ==
Johnson was born Halle Tanner in Pittsburgh, Pennsylvania on October 17, 1864, the oldest daughter of Benjamin Tucker Tanner and Sarah Elizabeth Tanner, prominent figures in the local African-American community. She was the oldest of nine siblings, including four sisters, two brothers, and two siblings who died in infancy. Johnson's father was a minister at the African Methodist Episcopal Church in Pittsburgh who also wrote several books, and Halle worked with him to publish The Christian Recorder, a publication of the church. Her brother was the painter Henry Ossawa Tanner. Her niece was Sadie Tanner Mossell Alexander, the first black woman in the United States to earn a Ph.D and the first president of Delta Sigma Theta.

In June 1886, Johnson married Charles Dillon and moved to Trenton, New Jersey. In 1887, they had a child together named Sadie Dillon who died from pneumonia about two years after their marriage.

== Career ==
After her husband's death, Johnson, then Halle Dillon, returned home to her family and entered the Women's Medical College of Pennsylvania at the age of 24, graduating with honors in 1891.

Around the time of her graduation, Booker T. Washington, founder of the Tuskegee Institute in Tuskegee, Alabama, had written to the Woman's Medical College of Pennsylvania, seeking an African-American physician to work at the school. Dillon began working at the Tuskegee Institute soon after her graduation.

In Alabama, Johnson was tutored by Dr. Cornelius N. Dorsette at Hale Infirmary to prepare for the medical exam. Johnson began her career by taking the Alabama state medical examination, a 10-day oral examination administered by the leading physicians of the state. She began this process by submitting her application to the board of examiners on August 17, 1891, and started the exam soon after. This rigorous exam required participants to give written responses to verbal questions from the state health office. Dr. Dillon scored a 78.81%, 3.81% higher than the requirement to pass (75%).

Johnson was under heavy scrutiny and the public eye due to her race and gender, but successfully passed the examination to become the first woman physician in Alabama.

Johnson worked at the Tuskegee Institute from 1891 to 1894. She also was accompanied by her father, who lectured for a year at the institute's Bible School. Johnson's taught up to two classrooms per term, teaching courses on anatomy and hygiene. She also supervised the medical care of 480 students, families, faculty, and officers. Johnson cultivated her own medicines to treat them. This is where she was also required to compound the prescriptions for the town and institute. Her contributions at Tuskegee Institute earned her a salary of 600 dollars a year, including room and board, and she was given a month of vacation each year. Additionally, Johnson founded a nursing school as well, practiced medicine and pharmacy in the community, and founded the Lafayette Dispensary for locals.

== Later life and death ==
In 1894, Johnson married Reverend John Quincy Johnson, an African Methodist Episcopal minister and mathematics professor at the Tuskegee Institute, and left her position at the Institute when they moved to Columbia, South Carolina. Her husband became president of Allen University, a private university for black students. They then moved to Hartford, Connecticut, Atlanta, Georgia, and Princeton, New Jersey, for his education in theology. They had three sons together: John Quincy Jr., Benjamin T., and Henry Tanner. In 1900, the Johnsons moved to Nashville, Tennessee, where John became a minister at Saint Paul's AME Church.

Johnson died from dysentery during childbirth on April 26, 1901. She is buried at Nashville's Greenwood Cemetery.
