= James McQueen (businessman) =

James William McQueen
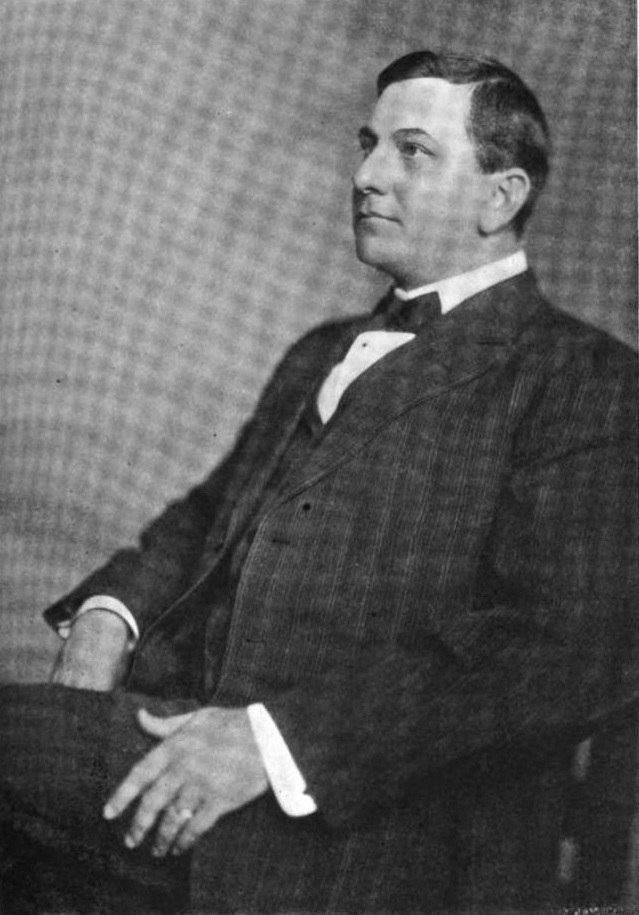
- Born: April 15, 1866; Society Hill, South Carolina, United States
- Died: April 20, 1925 (aged 59); New York, New York, United States
- Occupation: Businessperson

James William McQueen (April 15, 1866 – April 20, 1925) was an American businessperson. He served as the president of Sloss-Sheffield Steel & Iron Company from 1918 to 1925.

McQueen was born on April 15, 1866, in Society Hill, South Carolina, to John McQueen and Sarah Pickens. His father was a member of Congress from 1816 until secession, and he served in the Confederate Congress from 1861 to 1865. His mother was the granddaughter of Andrew Pickens, a Revolutionary War hero and member of Congress.

McQueen grew up in Eutaw, Alabama, and received his early education in private schools under the well known educators Daniel Collier and Joseph A. Taylor. At age 16, he began work as a clerk in a bank in Eutaw. In 1884, he began work for the Alabama Great Southern Railroad and served as agent at Eutaw, Tuscaloosa and other points along the line until 1890, when he moved to Birmingham, Alabama, as train dispatcher.

It was in 1891 that he began his service with Sloss-Sheffield Steel & Iron Company—then Sloss Iron & Steel Company—one of the greatest industrial concerns in the Southern United States. He began in the transportation department, but in the following year was made auditor of the company. He rose quickly through the ranks: in 1897, he was made secretary and treasurer, and in 1902 he was made vice-president. Finally, in 1918 he was elected president of the company. As an executive at Sloss-Sheffield, McQueen devoted much of his attention to the development of the company's properties. Many facilities were built or rebuilt under McQueen, including by-product coke ovens in North Birmingham. He served as the president of Sloss-Sheffield until his death.

In his private life, McQueen belonged to many civic and social clubs, and he was involved in the Birmingham Baseball Association. He sold his stake in the Birmingham Barons to Rick Woodward in 1909. He married Lydia Edwards on April 11, 1899, and they had two children (Giles E. and James W.).

McQueen died at the Waldorf Astoria in New York City on April 20, 1925.

== See also ==
- Sloss Furnaces
