= Cornelius N. Dorsette =

American doctor (1851/2 – 1897)

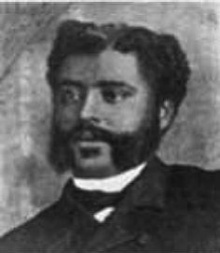
Portrait of Dr. Cornelius N. Dorsette

Cornelius Nathaniel Dorsette was an American physician who is often called the first African American doctor licensed in the state of Alabama. He was also the founder of Hale Infirmary, the first hospital in Montgomery for African American patients, staffed by African American doctors and nurses.

== Biography ==
=== Childhood and early education ===
Dorsette may have been born in Eden, North Carolina in 1851 or 1852, perhaps into slavery. He was the oldest of six siblings; his parents David and Lucinda Dorsette were probably farmers. He went to elementary school in Thomasville, and then went to the Hampton Institute in Virginia, where Booker T. Washington was one of his classmates; he graduated in 1878.

=== Move to New York; medical school and work as a doctor ===
Through a Dr. Vosburgh, a white trustee of the Hampton Institute, Dorsette ended up in Syracuse, New York: Vosburgh hired him to drive him and be a handyman, and then helped him work towards a career in medicine. He studied Latin, and for a while attended Syracuse University Medical School but health problems forced him to drop out. With financial help from Vosburgh, Dorsette tried to get into New York University's medical school, only to be denied because he was Black. Instead, he studied medicine at the University at Buffalo and graduated in 1882; he was their second Black graduate. For the next two years, he worked as a doctor in New York and particularly Wayne County, where he worked in the hospital's psychiatric ward, and in the asylum and poor house. He also ran a general practice, and by 1884 had repaid Vosburgh.

=== Move to the South ===
Through Booker T. Washington, whom he was in correspondence with in early 1883, Dorsette moved to the South. Washington told him that Montgomery was in dire need of medical doctors; in a letter dated February 28, 1883, Washington told him that the city had some 30,000 citizens, "more than half colored", and that there was no Black doctor in town; he also mentioned that "the white Congregational minister is very anxious to have you locate here". A colored doctor, Washington said, might well make $2,000 a year in Montgomery. Dorsette, after visiting the city and liking his prospects, moved. He had to get certified by the state board; at the time, it was a six-day exam, and the board was all-white. Dorsette apparently was "judged harshly", according to historian A. J. Wright, but passed. Local whites soon respected him as a doctor but it took him a while to win over the Black citizens, given the lack of training Black doctors sometimes received. Those who could afford a doctor usually went to white doctors, but Dorsette was willing to drive far for his patients, taking care of patients and delivering babies.

Dorsette soon married, and married well, but his marriage was brief. His wife, Sarah Hale, died within a year. Her father, a building contractor named James Hale, was the richest Black man in the city, and he helped Dorsette start a hospital for Black patients, nurses, and doctors. A white women's club helped raise funds. Hale Infirmary opened in 1890, and functioned until 1958. One of the nurses in training there was Halle Tanner Dillon Johnson; a graduate of the Woman's Medical College of Pennsylvania, Washington had brought her to Tuskegee to be the staff doctor. Under Dorsette's tutelage at Hale, she became the first Black woman in the state to be licensed as a doctor.

Dorsette was also Washington's personal doctor and looked after the medical needs of the faculty and students at Tuskegee University. Acquainted with vaccination, he was able to prevent a widespread outbreak of smallpox and received positive appraisals from local white doctors in the press. In 1886, Dorsette got married again to Lula Harper of Augusta, Georgia. They had two daughters. He maintained a connection with Tuskegee the rest of his life, and was on the university's board of trustees until his death. In Montgomery, he had a three-story building put up on Dexter Avenue for his office and a pharmacy with the help of his father-in-law. That building also housed the Montgomery Argus, a Black newspaper, edited by Harvey Patterson.

At the end of the Long Depression in 1896 (the year also of the Plessy v. Ferguson decision), he lost the building. Most of the doctors who had offices in the "Dorsette Building" left town, but Dorsette stayed. After a hunting trip in 1897, on Thanksgiving Day, he got ill and was diagnosed with pneumonia. On December 7, Dorsette died, at age 45. His funeral service was held at Montgomery's Old Ship African Methodist Episcopal Zion Church, and it was said that his funeral procession was the largest ever in the city for a Black citizen. One of his daughters, Sadie Dorsette, married the architect Vertner Woodson Tandy. Hale Infirmary is remembered with a historical marker; Dorsette himself is named on a historical marker for Centennial Hill, the historic neighborhood where he lived.
