= National Register of Historic Places listings in Grady County, Georgia =

This is a list of properties and districts in Grady County, Georgia that are listed on the National Register of Historic Places (NRHP).

This National Park Service list is complete through NPS recent listings posted August 21, 2026.

== Current listings ==
	Name on the Register	Image	Date listed	Location	City or town	Description
1	Cairo Commercial Historic District	Cairo Commercial Historic District	May 26, 1994 (#94000525)	Roughly bounded by Broad St., Railroad Ave. and Martin Luther King Ave., with adjacent properties on 2nd Ave. and 1st St; 30°52′37″N 84°12′32″W	Cairo	Former Belk, Broad Ave.
2	Dickey-Birdsong Plantation	Dickey-Birdsong Plantation	June 20, 1995 (#95000741)	Meridian Rd., off State Route 93 west of Beachton; 30°42′11″N 84°11′35″W	Beachton	Now Birdsong Nature Center on Birdsong Rd
3	Ebenezer African Methodist Episcopal Church and School	Ebenezer African Methodist Episcopal Church and School	July 23, 2008 (#08000714)	232 Martin Ave. 30°53′05″N 84°19′46″W	Whigham	
4	Evergreen Congregational Church and School	Evergreen Congregational Church and School	October 31, 2002 (#02001260)	497 Meridian Rd. 30°43′42″N 84°08′13″W	Beachton	
5	Ochlocknee Missionary Baptist Church and Cemetery	Ochlocknee Missionary Baptist Church and Cemetery	November 17, 2010 (#10000924)	521 U.S. Route 319 S. 30°45′26″N 84°05′33″W	Beachton	
6	Pebble Hill Plantation	Pebble Hill Plantation	February 23, 1990 (#90000146)	U.S. Route 319, 4 miles southwest of Thomasville; 30°46′49″N 84°03′50″W	Thomasville	
7	Pope's Museum		April 20, 2022 (#100007625)	192 Pope's Store Rd. 30°58′59″N 84°09′39″W	Ochlocknee	
8	Sasser Farm		September 8, 1983 (#83000230)	Sasser Farm Rd. south of Cairo; 30°47′11″N 84°14′20″W	Cairo	
9	Susina Plantation	Susina Plantation	August 12, 1970 (#70000205)	West of Beachton on Meridian Rd. 30°43′16″N 84°10′06″W	Beachton	
