= Susina Plantation =

Historic house in Georgia, United States

- U.S. National Register of Historic Places
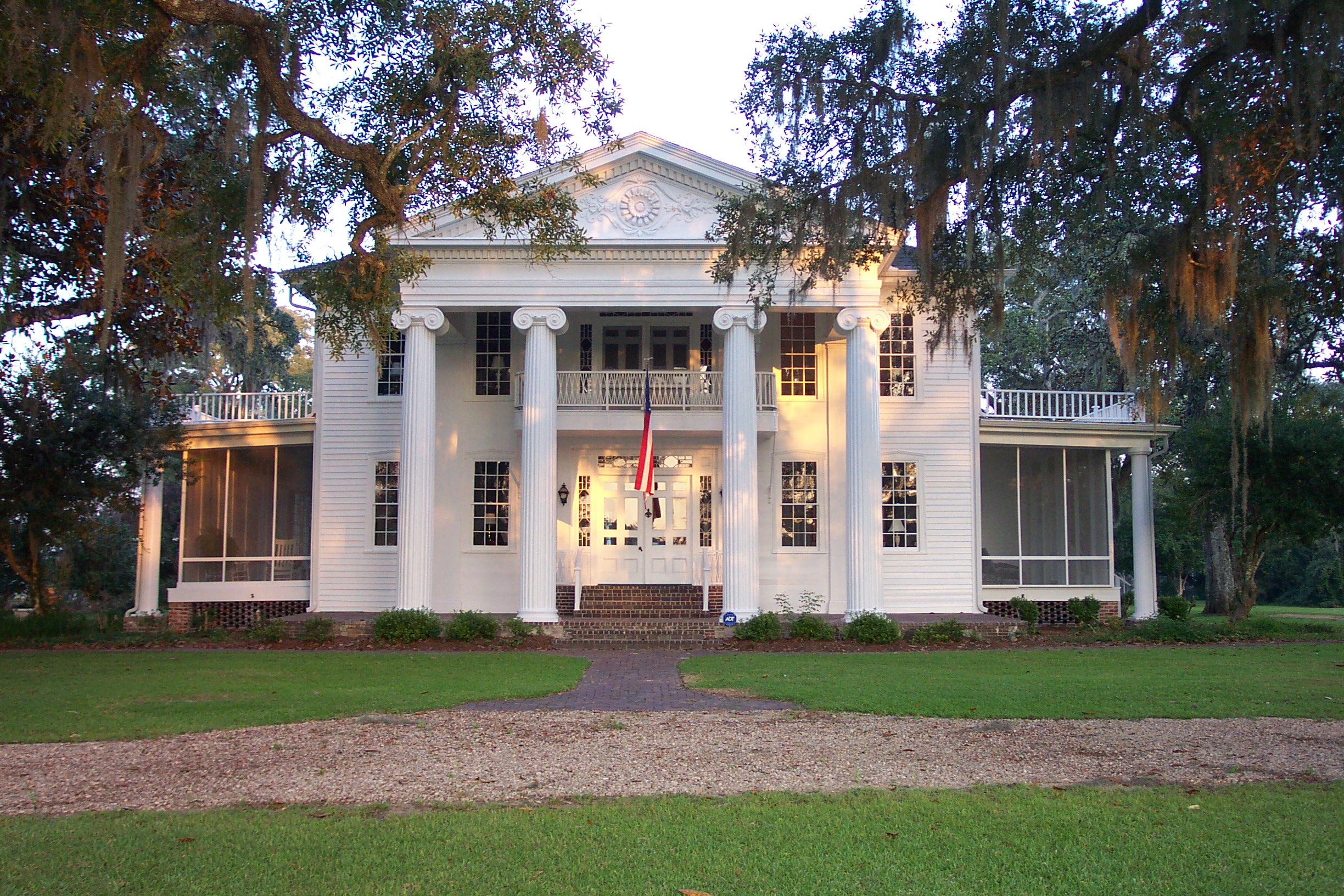

- Location within Georgia Location within the United States
- Nearest city: Beachton, Georgia
- Coordinates: 30.7211°N 84.16846°W
- Area: 100 acres (40 ha)
- Built: 1841
- Architect: John Wind
- Architectural style: Greek Revival, Ionic
- NRHP reference No.: 70000205
- Added to NRHP: August 12, 1970

Susina Plantation is an antebellum Greek Revival house and several dependencies on 140 acres (57 ha) near Beachton, Georgia, approximately 15 miles (24 km) southwest of the city of Thomasville, Georgia. It was originally called Cedar Grove. The house is listed on the National Register of Historic Places, and is currently a private residence.

== History ==
=== Antebellum ===
Edward Blackshear moved to the area circa 1822 from what was then Pulaski County, Georgia. Edward was the brother of General David Blackshear, the namesake of Lake Blackshear and the town of Blackshear, Georgia. Edward died September 3, 1829, and his land passed to his wife and five children. The largest block was bequeathed jointly to his sons James Joseph and Thomas Edward. These two continued to acquire land and ultimately amassed approximately 4,815 acres (1,949 ha).

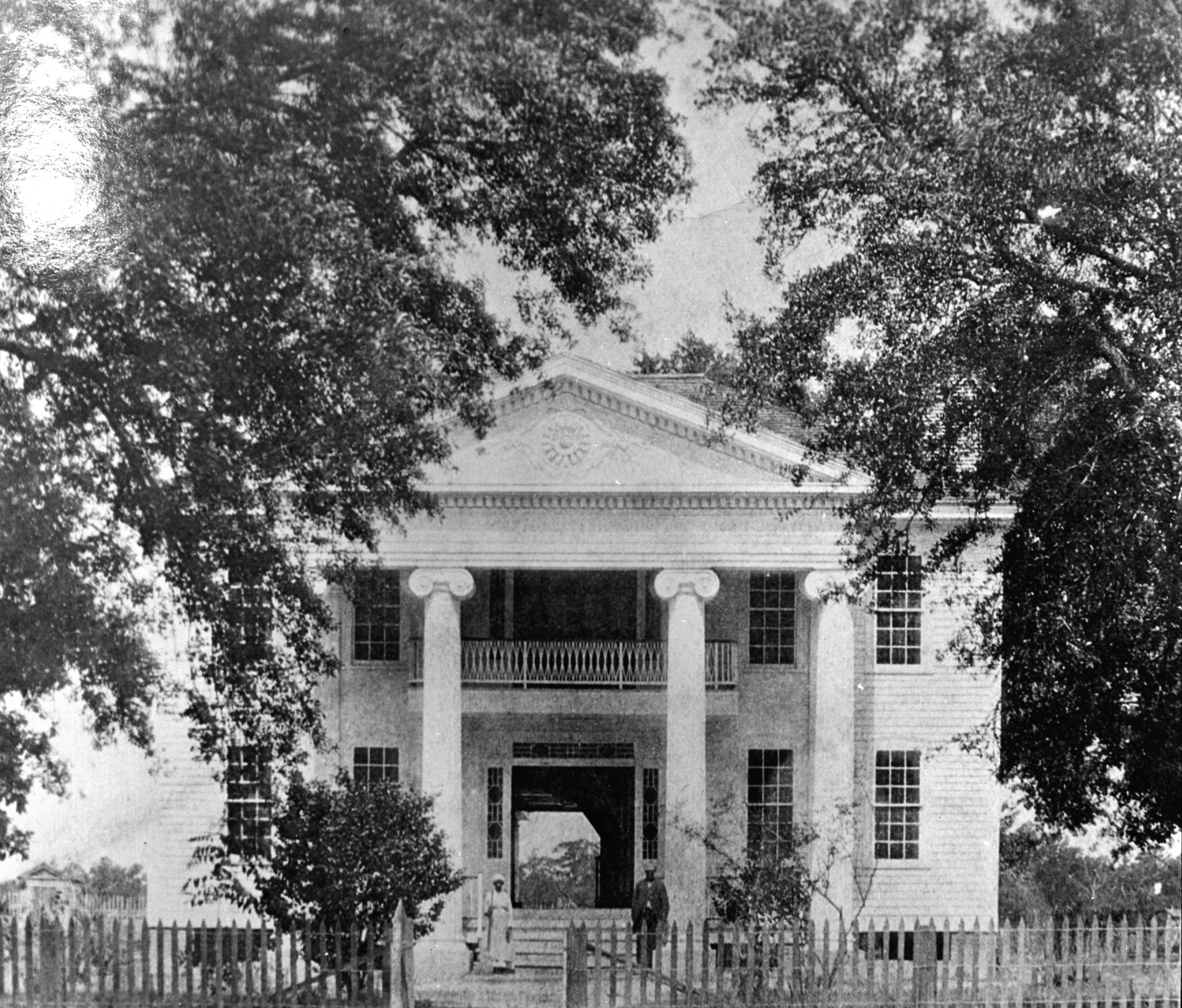
Cedar Grove, circa 1880, from the archives of the Thomas County Museum of History

Circa 1841, James Joseph commissioned the architect John Wind to design a plantation house. This photograph, although probably taken after the American Civil War, depicts the structure as originally built. John Wind was born in Bristol, England, in 1819. He was also the architect for the Greenwood, Fair Oaks, Oak Lawn, Pebble Hill and Eudora Plantations, and the Thomas County Courthouse. William Warren Rogers writes "Some of Wind's work still exists and reveals him as one of the South's most talented but, unfortunately, least known architects."

James Joseph Blackshear was killed in a cotton press accident on November 3, 1843, before the house was completed. His wife, Harriet Blackshear, completed the house and continued to acquire land. His will was not probated until 1857 and her new acquisitions were recorded in his name. Harriet became a prominent planter in her own right. In 1860, thirteen Thomas County plantations produced over 100 bales of cotton. Harriet Blackshear had the record with 235 bales produced by enslaved workers. She was also one of the county's larger rice producers and she raised 5000 bushels of sweet potatoes. Food crops were also required to feed not only her family, but the slaves who worked the land. The 1840 census recorded 43 male and 59 female slaves. When James Joseph's will was probated in 1857, it listed 161 slaves by name. Harriet Blackshear died in 1863. After the American Civil War, Cedar Grove fell onto hard times, but it remained in Blackshear hands until 1887.

=== Postbellum ===
In the 1880s and 1890s, Thomasville was a popular wintering area for wealthy Northern industrialists who came by scheduled rail and private rail cars to hunt and enjoy the pine-scented air. The old and then unproductive plantations were soon discovered and by 1890, all of the 70 plantations in the Thomasville area had been acquired for use primarily as private hunting preserves and retreats. In 1887, Cedar Grove was acquired by Dr. John Metcalfe of New York who used it as a hunting lodge. He renamed Cedar Grove to Susina. Dr. Metcalfe had a wife named Susan and wild plum grew on the property. Susina is Italian for plum. In 1891, A. Heywood Mason of Philadelphia purchased Susina Plantation and approximately 6400 acres (2590 ha). He had inherited a fortune made by his father James S. Mason who developed and sold shoe polish, called shoe blackening at the time. He added side porches to the house and probably the rear kitchen wing. He later expanded the dining room by enclosing a portion of the south porch.

The community around Susina was initially called Duncanville. Maps dated from 1887 until 1906 show the town as Susina. After 1906, the area become known as Beachton. Originally located in Thomas County, Susina Plantation is now located in Grady County which was formed out of Thomas and Decatur Counties in 1905.

A. Heywood Mason died in 1911 and the plantation was managed by his wife, Anna. After her death in 1931, A. Heywood Mason's son, James Mason II, managed Susina Plantation. His sister, Elanor Mason Butler and her husband expanded the nearby cottage to 5,000 square feet (460 m^{2}) circa 1925. In 1951, the land at Susina was divided among four heirs. One grandson of A. Heywood Mason, A. Heywood (Hey) Mason II, bought the interests of his brother and two sisters in the main house and the immediate dependencies. A. Heywood Mason II conducted repairs and renovations in 1951 and 1967. Susina Plantation was listed on the National Register of Historic Places on August 12, 1970.

=== Modern ===
In 1980, Susina Plantation was acquired by Anne Marie Walker and was operated as a bed and breakfast. Notable guests were Paul Newman and his wife Joanne Woodward, a Thomasville native. In 2000, Randall and Marilynn Rhea of Atlanta acquired the property for use as their private residence, and they hired general contractor Terrell Singletary of Thomasville to repair and renovate the main house and four of the dependencies. More recently, Susina Plantation has hosted events for the Grady County Historical Society, the Daughters of the American Revolution and the Thomas County Museum of History. The main house at Susina Plantation is considered by some to be one of the finest examples of the Greek Revival style. It was selected for the cover image of two books covering antebellum houses.

== Architecture ==
The main house sits on a knoll surrounded by large and mature live oak and magnolia lawns. John Wind's early work, such as Greenwood and Susina, were in traditional Greek Revival style. Later at Eudora and Fair Oaks, he skillfully added his own style which tended toward a later romantic or Oriental period. Susina's Ionic portico is supported by four two-story, fluted and tapered round columns. The portico extends across approximately three-fourths of the facade. The house was constructed from heart-pine cut on the property. The siding is clapboard except under the portico where the siding is set flush to resemble stone. The entablature runs completely around the house. The frieze of the portico is plain with large dentils under the cornice. The dentils are continued around the projecting cornice of the pediment. A sunflower rosette, perhaps hand carved by Wind, is in the center of the pediment. A cantilever balcony is under the portico, over the front door.

The front double door is eight by seven feet and has sidelights and a fixed transom with lattice work created by strips of wood. The molding around the door has a fret design at the upper and lower corners with fluting running the length of the posts. The door to the balcony is a seven by seven foot version of the main door. The first and second-level windows have nine over nine lights and triangular pediments. The windows are six feet six inches high by two feet ten inches wide.

The plan is a basic four over four room layout with a central enclosed breezeway. In the original 1841 house, the rooms on the north (right) side of the house were not as deep as on the south, so the rear included a covered porch. A symmetric, circular staircase ascended from the north side of the breezeway to the left side of the top hallway. A room was formed on the second level behind the circular stairwell. The stairwell includes a small, decorative niche. Each room includes a fireplace that extends into the room approximately three feet. Mantels are supported by pilasters of varying design. The interior uses wainscoting throughout with top projecting molding serving as a dado. Door and window moldings are fluted with lintel sections. Simple crown molding completes a relatively simple but elegant woodwork style.

Circa 1891, A. Heywood Mason added porches that extend the full length of the house on both the north and south sides. The architect is unknown. Mason also probably added the rear kitchen wing. No photographs prior to 1895 of the rear of the house are known, so dates of renovations at the rear are in question. Between 1891 and 1930, the 1841 rear porch was enclosed to form new rooms on both levels. A south rear screened sleeping room above the side porch was added circa 1925. This sleeping porch and a rear race for air conditioning were removed by the Rhea's in 2000 to return the exterior to an earlier period.

== Resources ==
- James S. Mason (1995), Oh, Susina!, Thomasville, GA, Craigmiles & Associates.
- Jacquelyn Cook (2009), The Greenwood Legacy, Smyna, GA, Bell Bridge Books.
