= John Wind =

American architect

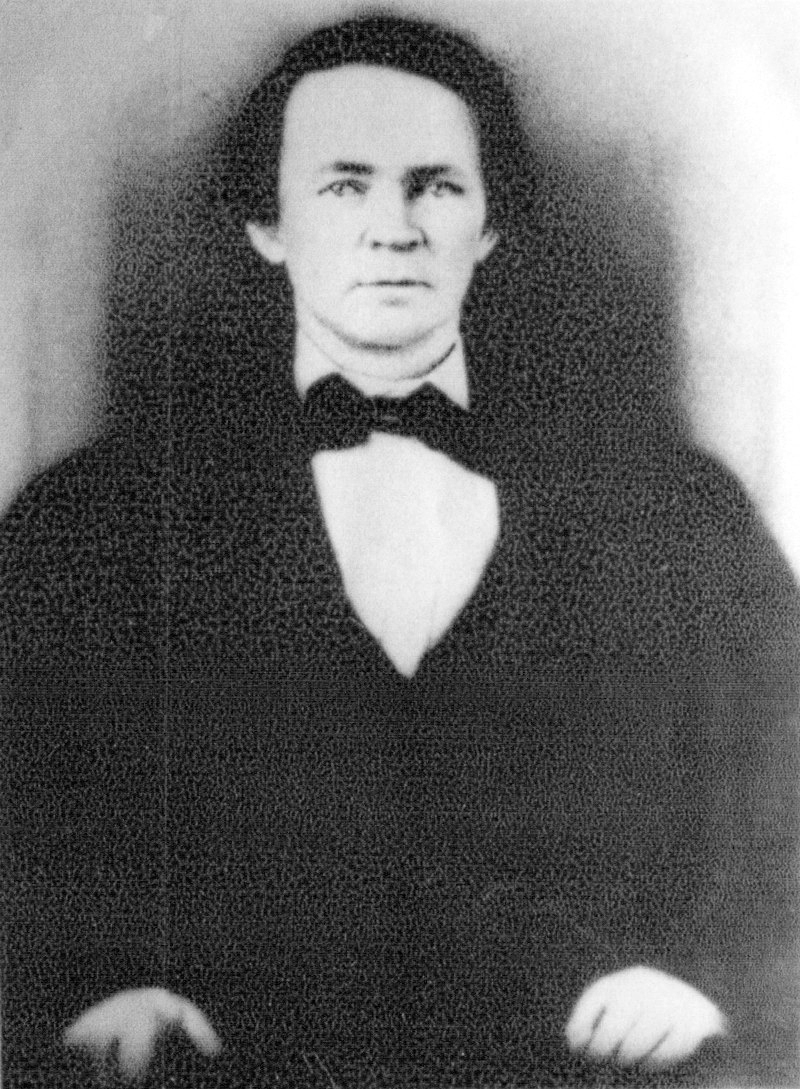
- Born: 1819; Bristol, England
- Died: May 18, 1863 (aged 43–44); Thomasville, Georgia, United States
- Occupation: Architect
- Buildings: Greenwood Plantation (c. 1838); Susina Plantation (c. 1841); Pebble Hill Plantation (c. 1850); Oak Lawn Plantation (c. 1850); Eudora Plantation (c. 1850); Thomas County (GA) Court House (c. 1855); Fair Oaks Plantation (c. 1856); Brooks County Courthouse (c. 1859)

John Wind was an architect who designed his work in southwest Georgia in the United States from approximately 1838 until his death in 1863. He was born in Bristol, England, in 1819. John Wind designed the Greenwood, Susina, Oak Lawn, Pebble Hill, Eudora and Fair Oaks monumental plantation houses, the Thomas county courthouse and a few in-town cottages. William Warren Rogers writes "Some of Wind's work still exists and reveals him as one of the South's most talented but, unfortunately, least known architects." John Wind also worked as an inventor, jeweler, master mechanic and surveyor. He devised a clock that remained wound for one year and was awarded a patent for a cotton thresher and cleaner, Patent Number 5369. He was also the co-recipient of a corn husker and sheller patent in 1860. But it was his work and creations as an architect that made him an enduring figure that left a mark on society.

== His first commission ==
Circa 1838, merchant and planter Jackson J. Mash brought John Wind from New York city to Duncanville, Georgia, to design a large house for his plantation. Later, the area was identified as Mashes on railroad maps and as Susina from 1888 to 1906. It is now Beachton, or on a few maps, Moncrief slightly to the south. No known photographs exist for the Mash work. The house was brick, with four large columns supporting a portico with a small balcony under the portico and over the front door. The Southern Enterprise newspaper described it as a "fine mansion, where spacious apartments, gorgeous furniture (are housed)." The building cost between $12,000 and $15,000. This house burned in 1876.

== Traditional Greek Revival ==
The Greek Revival began waning in the United States circa 1840, but not in the South, where it remained a popular form. The Greek Revival style "was Wind's idiom and he utilized it to the point of near perfection." This idiom was a large portico supported by large two-story columns with Ionic capitals and a full entablature. The pediment included a decorative carving of a flower rosette. Under the portico was a cantilevered balcony with balusters of wheat and sheaf design. Under the balcony were double doors with sidelights and a fixed transom. Windows were nine over nine lights with triangular pediments. The basic plan is four over four with an enclosed breezeway the full length of the house. A 180 degree curved staircase rises from the right to the left on the second level. This form is common to Greenwood, Susina and Oak Lawn. Wind is known to have overseen construction and carved woodwork for at least some of his commissions.

John Wind was commissioned, circa 1838–1840, by one of the early settlers to Thomas county, Thomas Jones, to design a third house at Greenwood Plantation, just west of Thomasville, Georgia. Local stories often claim Greenwood was "completed during a nine-year period from 1835 to 1844." At Greenwood, the portico covers the full facade, producing a rather massive appearance. Sometime c. 1899, the owner Colonel Oliver Hazard Payne, commissioned noted architect Stanford White. White was the architect of Rosecliff and Madison Square Garden II among other notable buildings. White suggested few changes because of the existing "perfection" of Wind's Greek Revival design. He added two small, symmetric side wings and additional living and kitchen space in the rear. The evening of April 2, 1993, during a celebration of a just completed $2 million restoration, Greenwood caught fire and little except the exterior brick walls and two columns were saved. The exterior has been restored but the interior has not. Greenwood is held by the Greentree Foundation.

Circa 1841, James Joseph Blackshear, hired John Wind to design a house for his plantation Cedar Grove in Duncanville. James J. Blackshear married Harriet Jones, the sister of Thomas Jones of Greenwood. At Cedar Grove, the portico spans about 2/3 of the facade. The partial-width portico results in a less massive and perhaps more elegant appearance. The exterior of Cedar Grove is wood clapboard except under the portico where the siding is set flush to resemble stone. The rooms on the right (north) side of the house were not as deep as on the left, and this rear area included a covered porch. In 1887, Dr. John Metcalfe of New York acquired Cedar Grove and renamed it Susina. In 1891, A. Heywood Mason of Philadelphia acquired Susina and added the side porches and modified the rear kitchen wing. At a later date the dining room was increased by enclosing a portion of the south porch, and the rear porch was replaced with added rooms on both levels. The architect of these renovations is unknown, but the additions complement Wind's original vision. Susina Plantation is extant and the only Wind plantation home not touched or destroyed by fire.

Circa 1850, Mitchell B. Jones hired John Wind to design Oak Lawn. Mitchell Jones was a brother of Thomas Jones. This was Wind's largest plantation house. Like Greenwood and Susina, Oak Lawn remained true to Greek Revival. It had an octastyle portico that projected from a full-width portico, all supported by eight, two-story fluted columns. Rather than cantilevered, the balcony was supported by six single-story square pillars, similar to those of Fair Oaks. Like the portico, the balcony had a small projection of the center section. It was perhaps the finest of Wind's work. It was destroyed by fire in May 1883.

== Later styles ==
Also circa 1850, John W. H. Mitchell hired John Wind to design the second house Pebble Hill. This single-story structure was Classical Revival and bore little resemblance to Wind's other designs except in details. The windows in each of the two pediments were identical to the window originally in the pediment of Fair Oaks. The basic plan was H-shaped with eight rooms and a wide hall. Porches with square pillars ran toward the entry door with embellished sidelights and a transom. This house was destroyed by fire in 1934. A replica of the house is located on the SW side of the Pebble Hill property near the Fair Oaks house. The current monumental house, open to the public at Pebble Hill, is not a Wind design.

John Spain was the stepson of Thomas Jones brother, Major Francis Jones. Also circa 1850, Spain hired John Wind to design what later was named Eudora Plantation, east of Thomasville in what is now Brooks County. It included a full-facade portico with entablature supported by six two-story, fluted Doric columns made of cypress. The entablature continued around the house and included carved brackets that appear to support the eaves. Unlike Wind's other plantation homes, Eudora did not include a pediment. It did have other Wind signatures, such as siding set flush under the portico to resemble stone and a cantilever balcony over the front door. This door had an ogee-curved arch. While some elements of the house comply with Greek Revival, the ogee and entablature bracket curves depart from the style. However, Wind's talent is revealed in his ability to harmoniously blend these newer-styled features into the Greek Revival. Eudora was destroyed by fire in 1987.

Circa 1856, John Wind began work on Fair Oaks for Colonel Richard Mitchell, a hero of the War of 1812. Like Oak Lawn, the portico and balcony had projecting center sections. However, the pediment had a triangular window rather than a carved rosette. If the rosette was Wind's usual last signature, it could have been replaced with a window, because Wind died in 1863, perhaps before the house was completed. The entablature was complete, but had no dentil, resembling the Tuscan order. Fourteen-inch square pillars rather than fluted round columns were used. The balcony entablature was deeper than that of the portico, and the balcony pillars were attached by curved dropped sections on the entablature, creating an arch effect between the columns. These elements and the triangular window combine to give a somewhat Oriental touch to the appearance, again illustrating Wind's ability to elegantly abandon the Greek Revival with his own unique style. Fair Oaks burned to the ground in 1962. It was reconstructed with an identical exterior, except a carved acorn and oak leaves replaced the pediment window.

== Other architectural works ==
=== Courthouses ===
Courthouse in Brooks County, Georgia

In 1855, Wind was commissioned to construct a new courthouse for Thomas county and work was completed by 1858. A charcoal drawing of the original courthouse, perhaps drawn by Wind, a photograph of the courthouse in 1888 when it was renovated in Italianate style and a modern photograph with the columns enclosed are reproduced in a modern invitation to an open house at the courthouse. Wind was also paid $100 to design the Brooks County Courthouse in the adjacent county.

=== In-town cottages ===
Another of Wind's idioms was the in-town cottage. It is somewhat less certain which cottages in Thomasville were Wind designs, an example being the Arthur Wright House on Fletcher street.

Very probably, the Augustin Hansell house on Hansell street was a Wind design in the late 1850s. It has a 1 1/2-story portico with a double window in the pediment. Brackets under the pediment cornice and entablature run entirely around the house. Six square pillars rise from the porch to support the pediment. These pillars also serve as the newels of the porch railing of square balusters. It has flush siding under the portico, a Wind feature.

Also around the late 1850s, Wind designed the Robert Hardaway House. It is two stories with a one-story porch supported by four square, grooved pillars rising from the porch deck, with a fleur-de-lis design above the plinth and below the capitals. These pillars also serve as newels for the railing. The flat-roofed porch has an entablature with an arched connection to the pillars, and the front window has a mitered casing, both similar to Fair Oaks. Like his plantation houses, Haradaway has a double door with sidelights and a fixed transom. This house also has flush siding under the porch.

== Notable works ==
A number of his works survive and at least six of these are listed on the U.S. National Register of Historic Places.

Works include:

- Brooks County Courthouse, Courthouse Sq. Quitman, Georgia, NRHP-listed
- Eudora Plantation, 3.5 mi. S of Quitman off GA 33, Quitman, Georgia, NRHP-listed
- Greenwood Plantation, GA 84, Thomasville, Georgia, NRHP-listed
- Augustine Hansell House, 429 S. Hansell St., Thomasville, Georgia, NRHP-listed
- Susina Plantation, W of Beachton on Meridian Rd., Beachton, Georgia, NRHP-listed
- Thomas County Courthouse, N. Broad St., Thomasville, Georgia, NRHP-listed
- Hardeway House (1856), 526 North Dawson Street, Thomasville, Georgia, in the NRHP-listed Dawson Street Residential Historic District

== Personal ==
Little is known about John Wind's early life. He was born in Bristol, England, in 1819, and was a graduate of Queens College. His diploma allegedly bore the signature of Queen Victoria, and since she ascended to the throne on June 20, 1837, he could not have arrived in Thomasville prior to 1838. While work began on Greenwood c. 1835, John Wind would only have been 16. It seems unlikely that he would have been trained in England, traveled to New York and arrived in Thomasville by 1835. It is more probable that skilled slaves were bought, the timber was cut for extended drying, and brick manufacture began at Greenwood as early as 1835. A probable date for his arrival in the United States is 1838 or 1839. A letter written by his great-grandson, J. E. Wind, mentions that John Wind's father's name was William and that John had two sisters, Mary Anna and perhaps Suzanna.

In 1848, John Wind married Sylvania Bethany Donalson. They had Cornelia (1849), Fuller (1852) and Robert (1856). His son Fuller purchased the Cairo Messenger newspaper in 1904, the same year it was formed. The Messenger remains in the Wind family. In the 1850 census, John Wind was recorded as 31 years old with a wife, two children and two slaves. He lived in a U-shaped cottage on Hawkins street. Half of his cottage was extant before the entire structure was lost. Two medallions of oak leaves of cut tin were set in the gable ends of the house. These were salvaged and reside at Thomasville Landmarks.

He was a Mason in the Thomasville Lodge from 1854 to 1858. He died May 18, 1863, not particularly wealthy. A later census recorded Sylvania's net worth at $1000 in real estate and $500 personal property.
