= Brooks County Courthouse =

Brooks County Courthouse may refer to:

- Brooks County Courthouse (Georgia), Quitman, Georgia
- Brooks County Courthouse (Texas), Falfurrias, Texas
