= Ochlocknee Missionary Baptist Church and Cemetery =

Historic church in Grady County, Georgia, US

- U.S. National Register of Historic Places
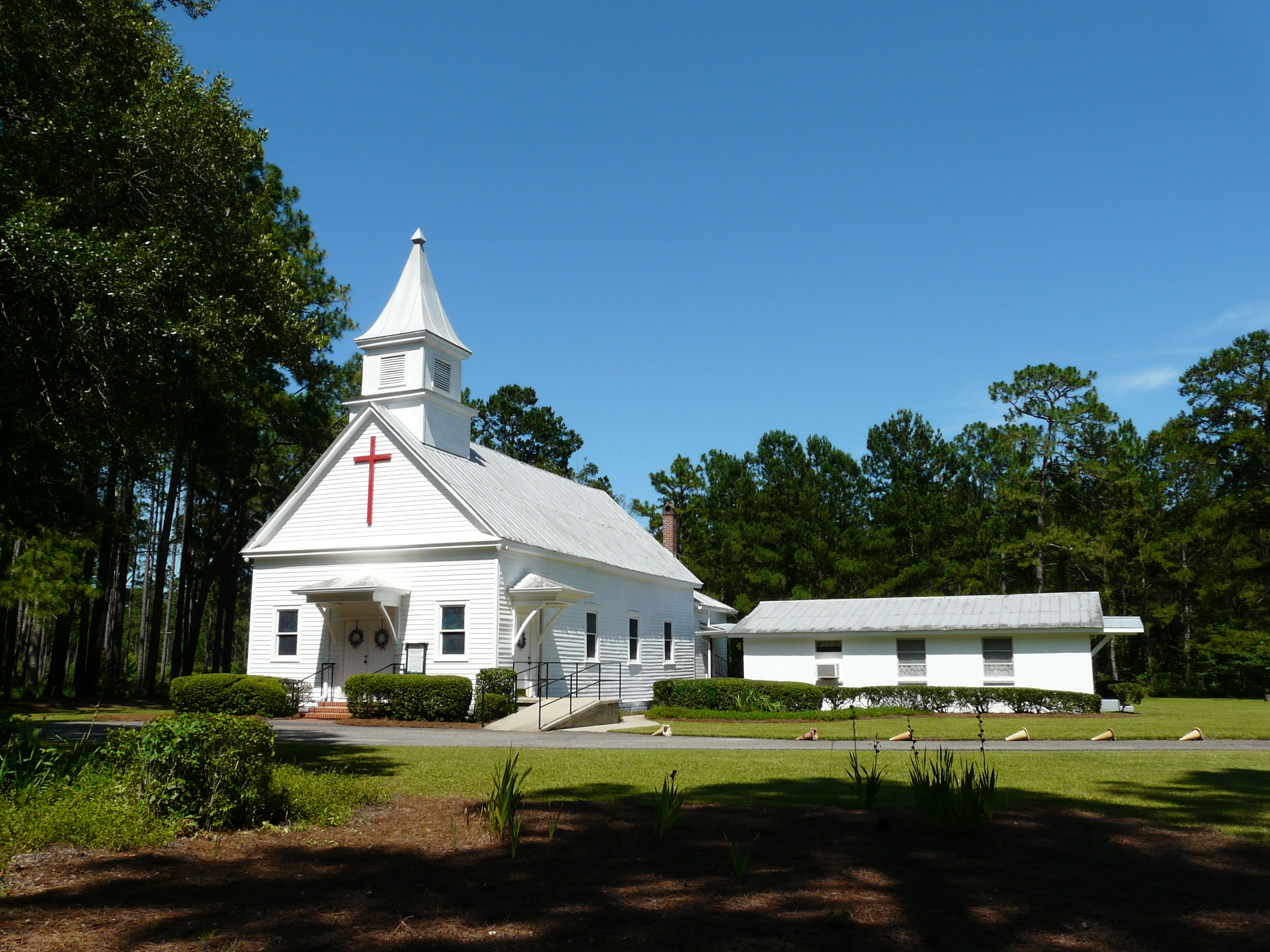

- Location within Georgia Location within the United States
- Location: 521 U.S. Route 319 S., Beachton, Georgia
- Coordinates: 30.757222°N 84.092500°W
- Built: 1918, 1947
- NRHP reference No.: 10000924
- Added to NRHP: November 17, 2010

The Ochlocknee Missionary Baptist Church and Cemetery is a historic church and school at 521 U.S. Route 319 S. in Beachton, Georgia. It was listed on the National Register of Historic Places in 2010.

It was built in 1918. The church was founded in 1848 by slaves and was originally located "on the outskirts" of Pebble Hill Plantation. The congregation moved to the current location in 1918 after a fire destroyed the previous church.

The property has "dates of significance" of 1918 and 1947 recorded in the National Park Service database; such dates are often dates of original construction and later expansion of buildings. It is listed as significant in the areas of architecture and of black history.

It is located about 3.8 miles (6.1 km) east northeast of the hamlet of Beachton. There is a church named "Little Ochlocknee Baptist Church" which is different; that church is located four miles east of Ochlocknee, Georgia, about 20 miles north.

== See also ==
- Evergreen Congregational Church and School, also NRHP-listed in Beachton, at 497 Meridian Road
