= Lapham–Patterson House =

Historic house in Florida, US

- U.S. National Register of Historic Places
- U.S. National Historic Landmark
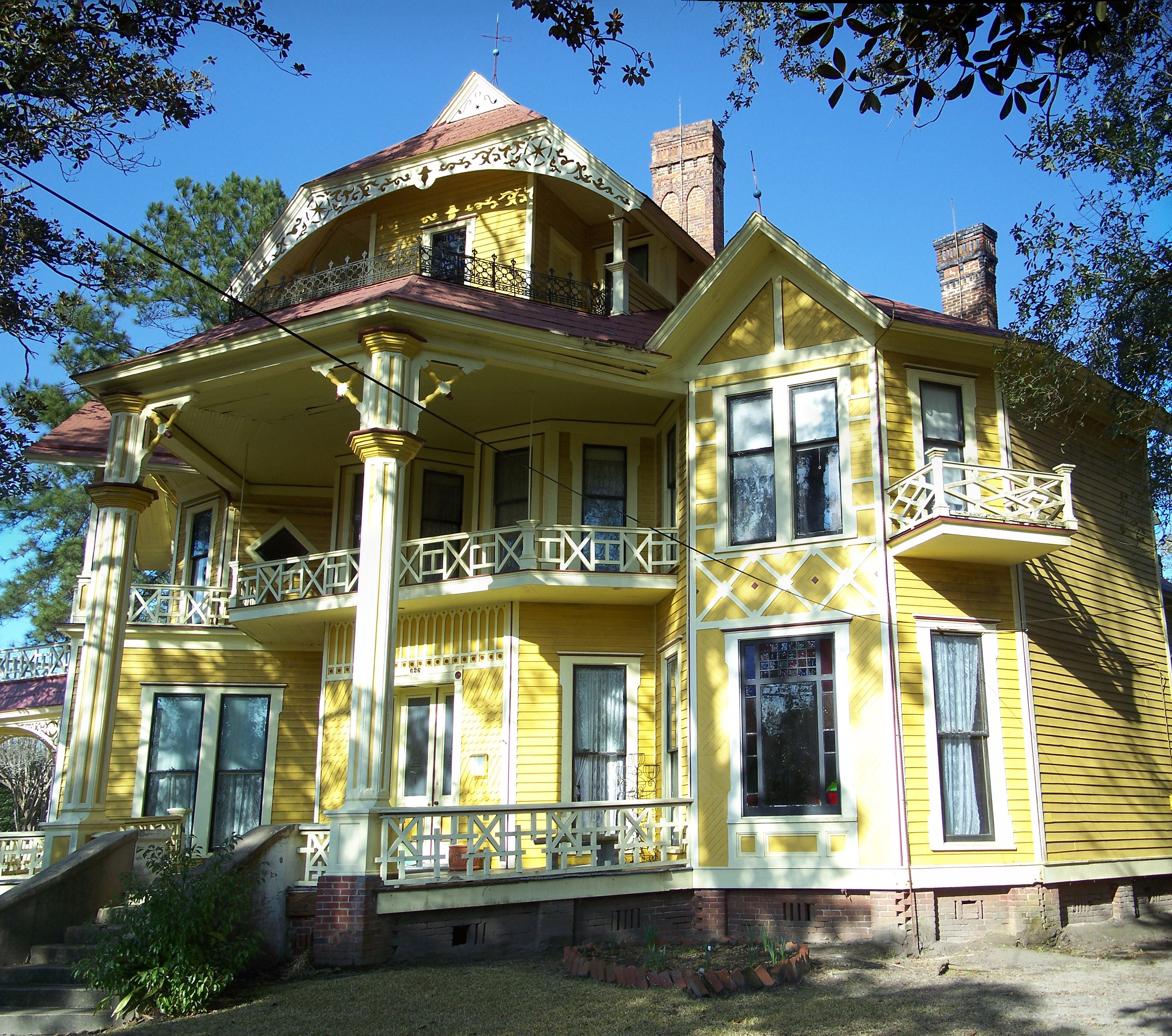

- Location within Georgia Location within the United States
- Location: Thomasville, Georgia
- Coordinates: 30.84562°N 83.98296°W
- Built: 1885
- Architect: Rommerdal, Tudor
- Architectural style: Queen Ann Whimsey
- NRHP reference No.: 70000868

Significant dates
- Added to NRHP: August 12, 1970
- Designated NHL: November 7, 1973

The Lapham–Patterson House is a historic site at 626 North Dawson Street in Thomasville, Georgia. The house, built between 1884-85 as a winter cottage for businessman C.W. Lapham of Chicago, is a significant example of Victorian architecture. It has a number of architectural details, such as fishscale shingles, an intricately designed porch, long-leaf pine inlaid floors, and a double-flue chimney. Inside, the house was well-appointed with a gas lighting system, hot and cold running water, indoor plumbing, and modern closets. Its most significant feature is its completely intentional lack of symmetry. None of the windows, doors, or closets are square. The house is a Georgia Historic Site and is also a National Historic Landmark, designated in 1973 for its architecture. It is also a contributing building in the National Register-listed Dawson Street Residential Historic District.

The three-story structure has a mellow-yellow exterior with brick-red roof and chimneys. At the core of the house is a hexagonal-shaped room. There are at least 50 exits; Mr. Lapham had been in the Great Chicago Fire and subsequently became paranoid about being trapped in a burning building.

The house was deliberately constructed slightly askew to take advantage of sunlight entering the third floor during the Spring and Fall Equinoxes. Within is a gentlemen's parlor with a small stage featuring a stained-glass window in the center. In the fretwork outside the room over the balcony are animal and amorphous shapes cut into the wood. In the center is a cutout of what is presumably the head of Mrs. O'Leary's cow.

During the Spring and Fall Equinoxes the patterns are projected by sunlight onto the floor through the glass. The total effect is that, in the center of the stained glass window's colorful pattern on the floor, the shadow of the cow's head can be seen.

Mr. Lapham was a Quaker.

== Images ==
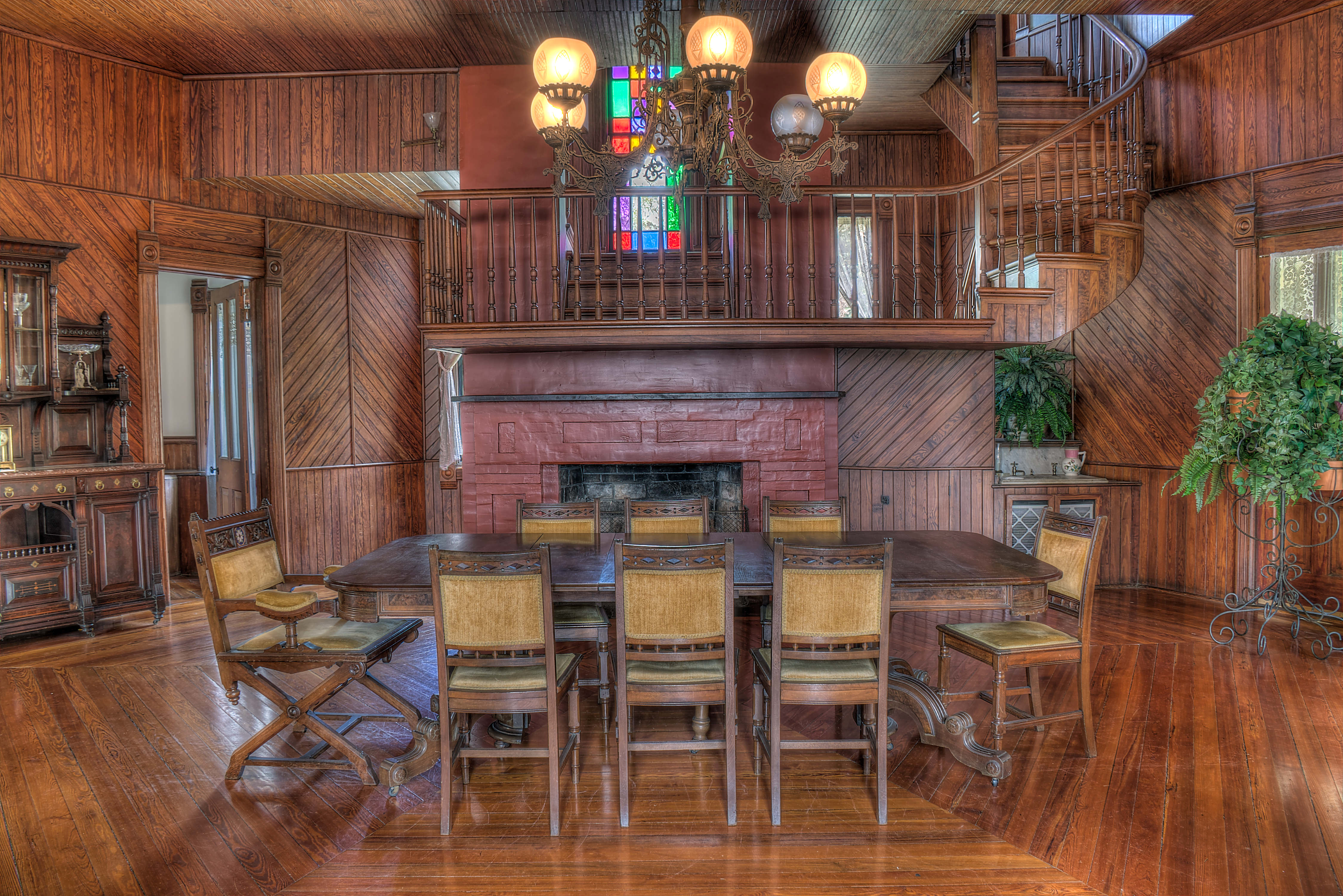
The dining room

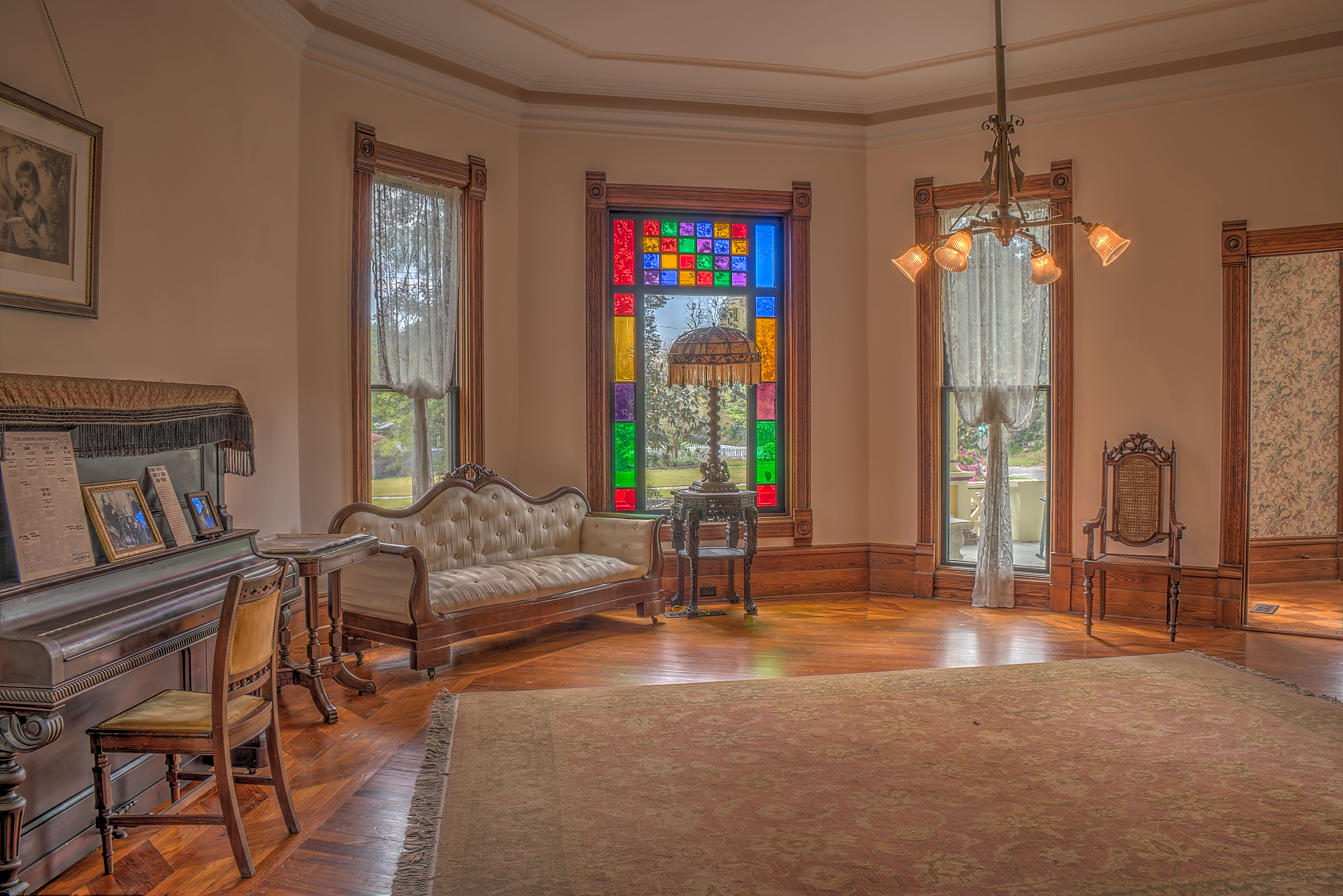
Formal parlor

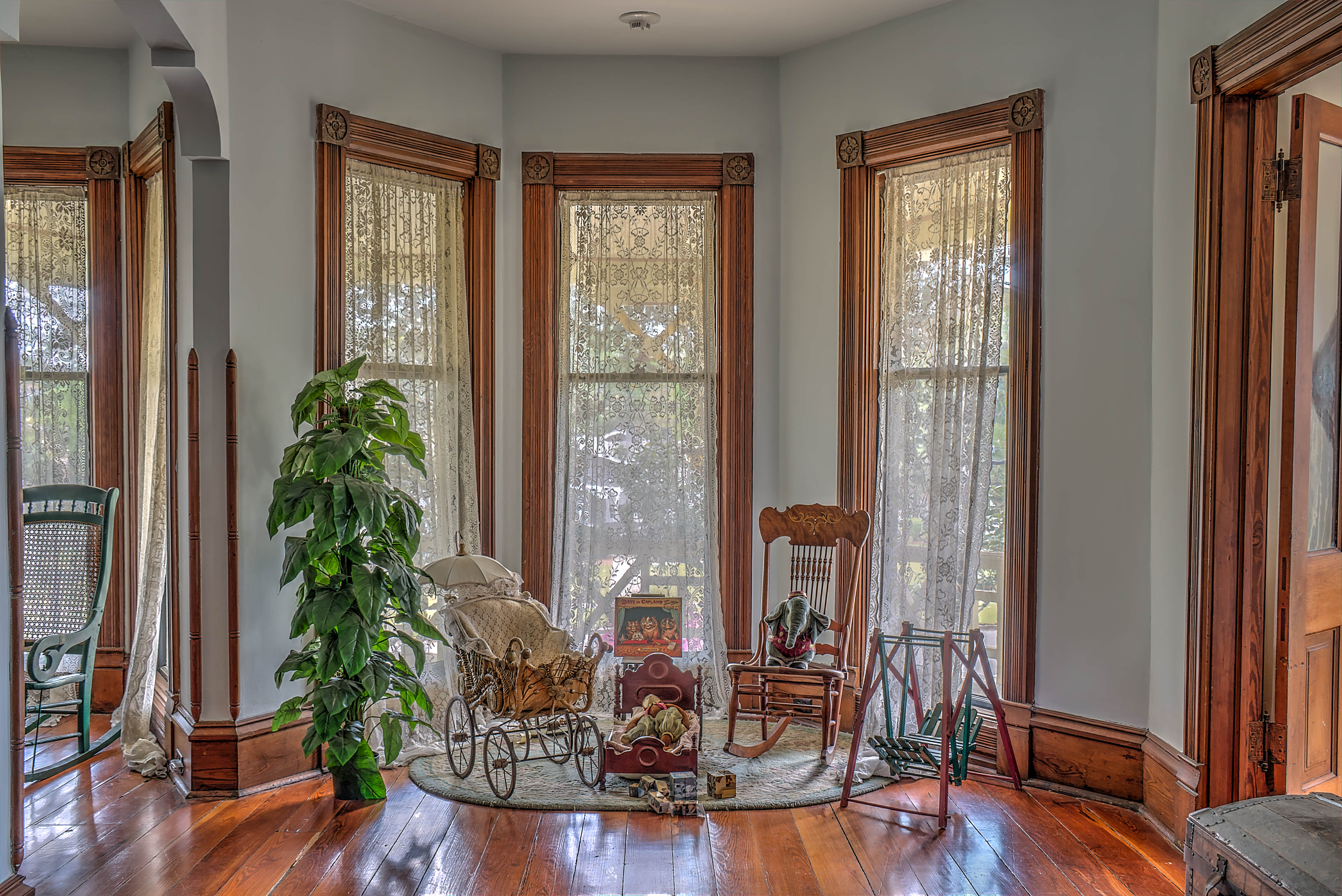
Detail of windows

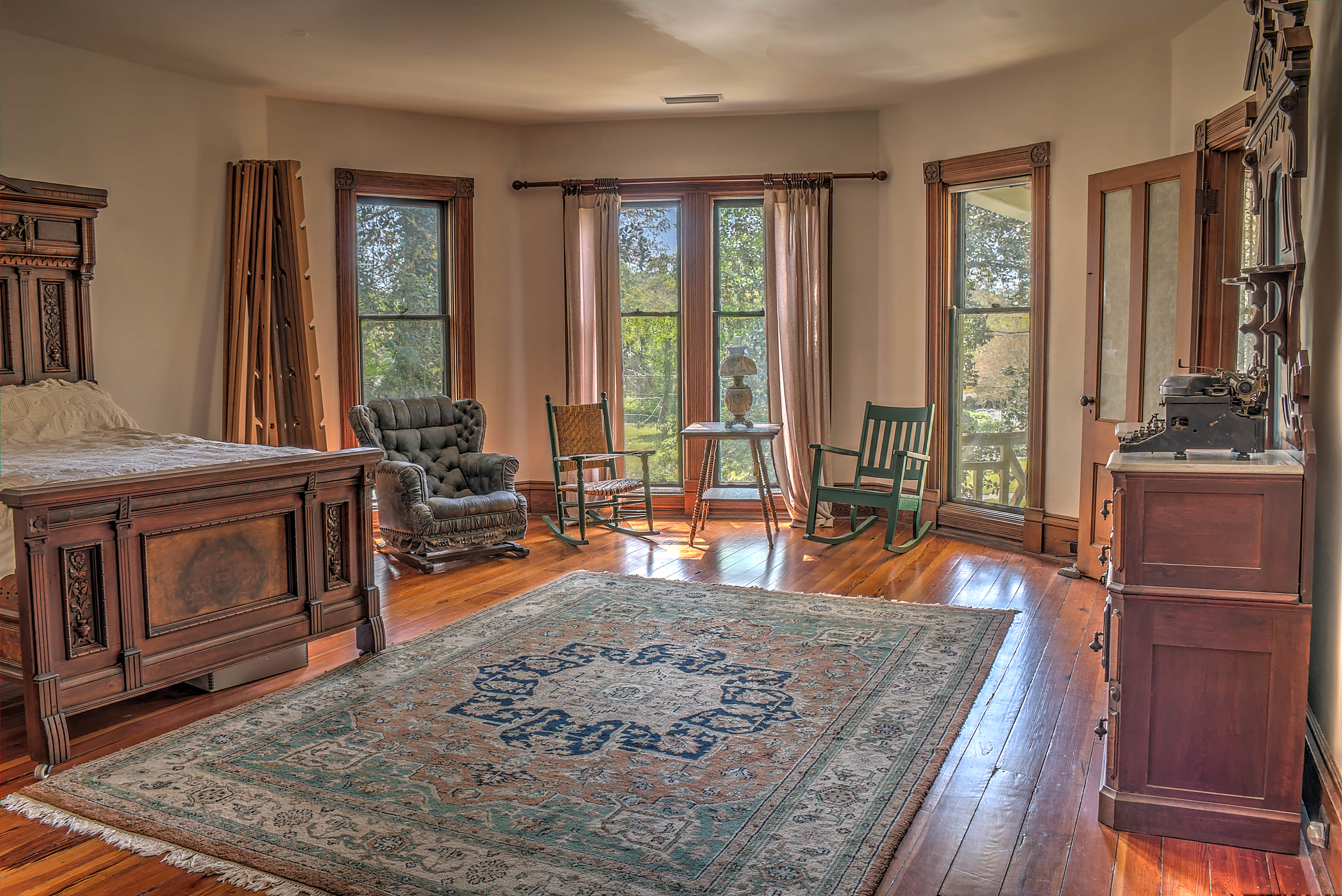
Guest bedroom

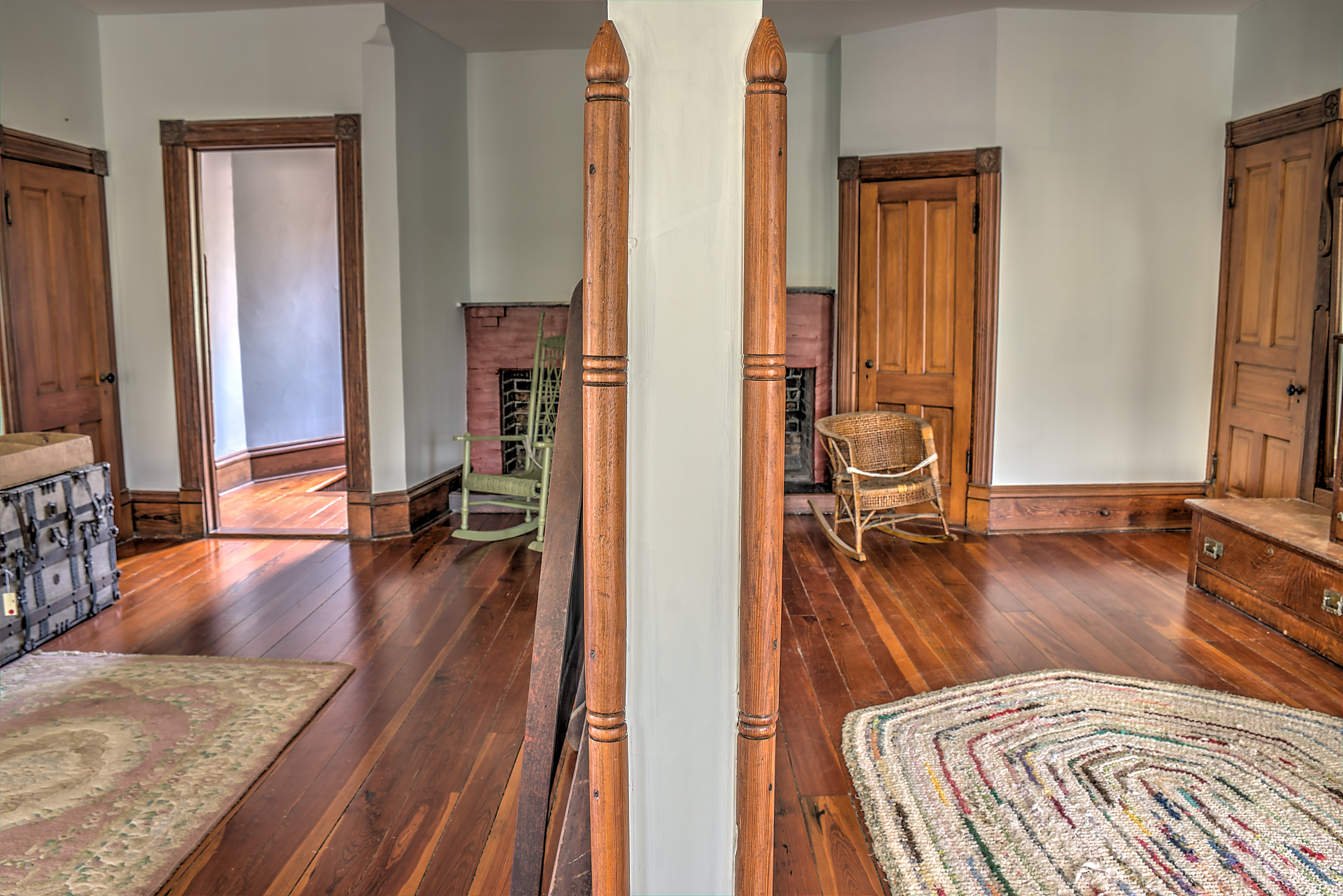
Sitting rooms

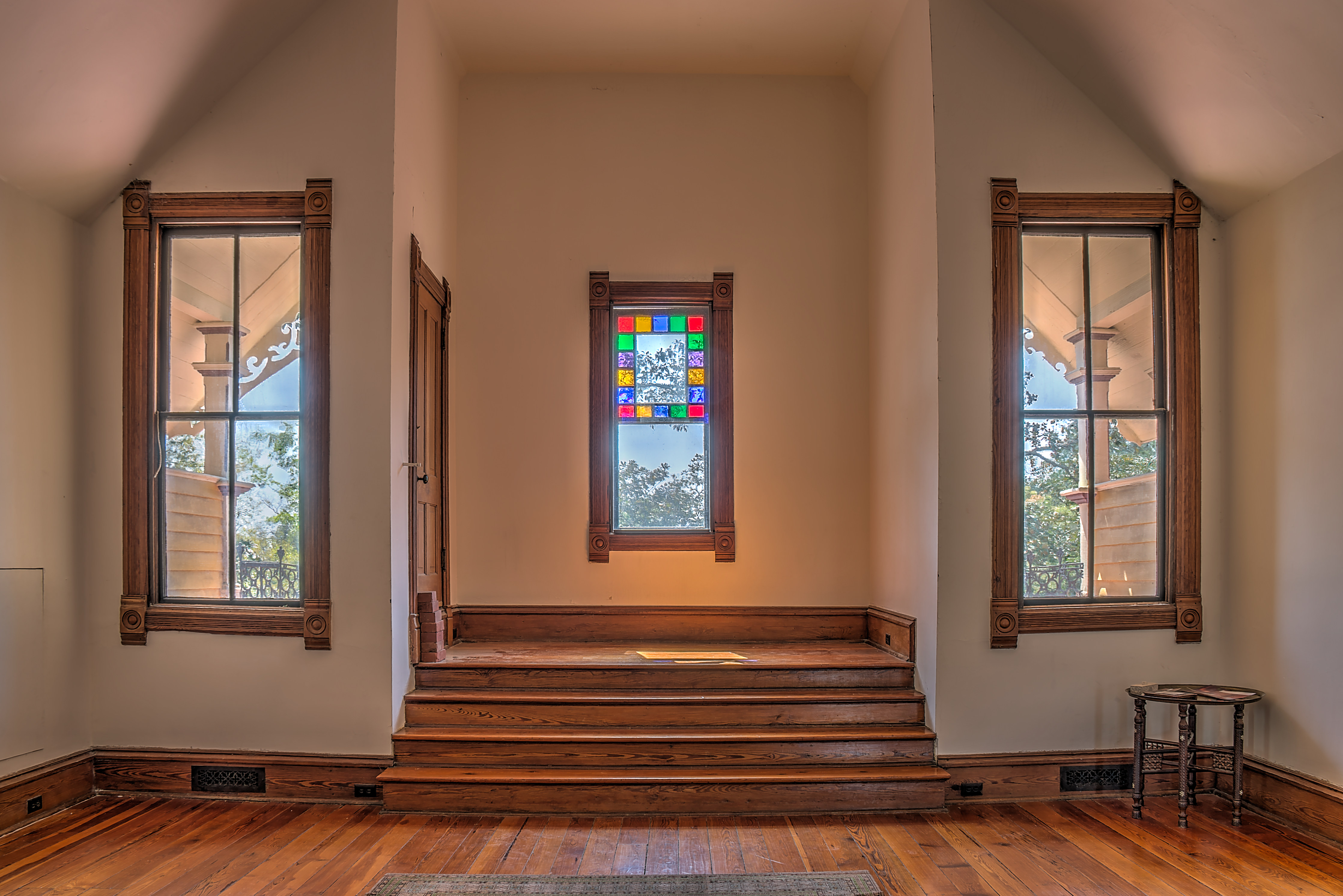
Gentlemen's parlor

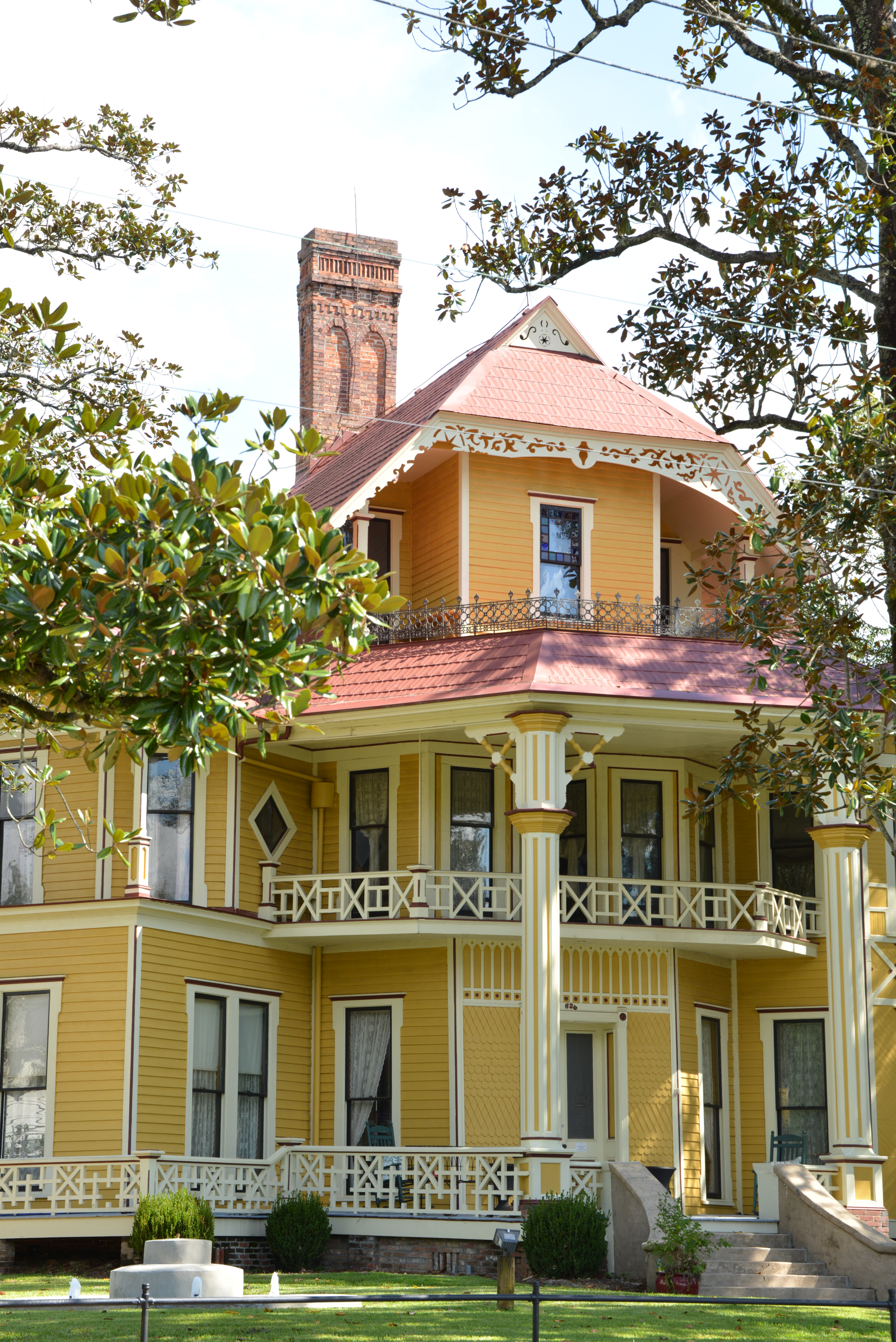

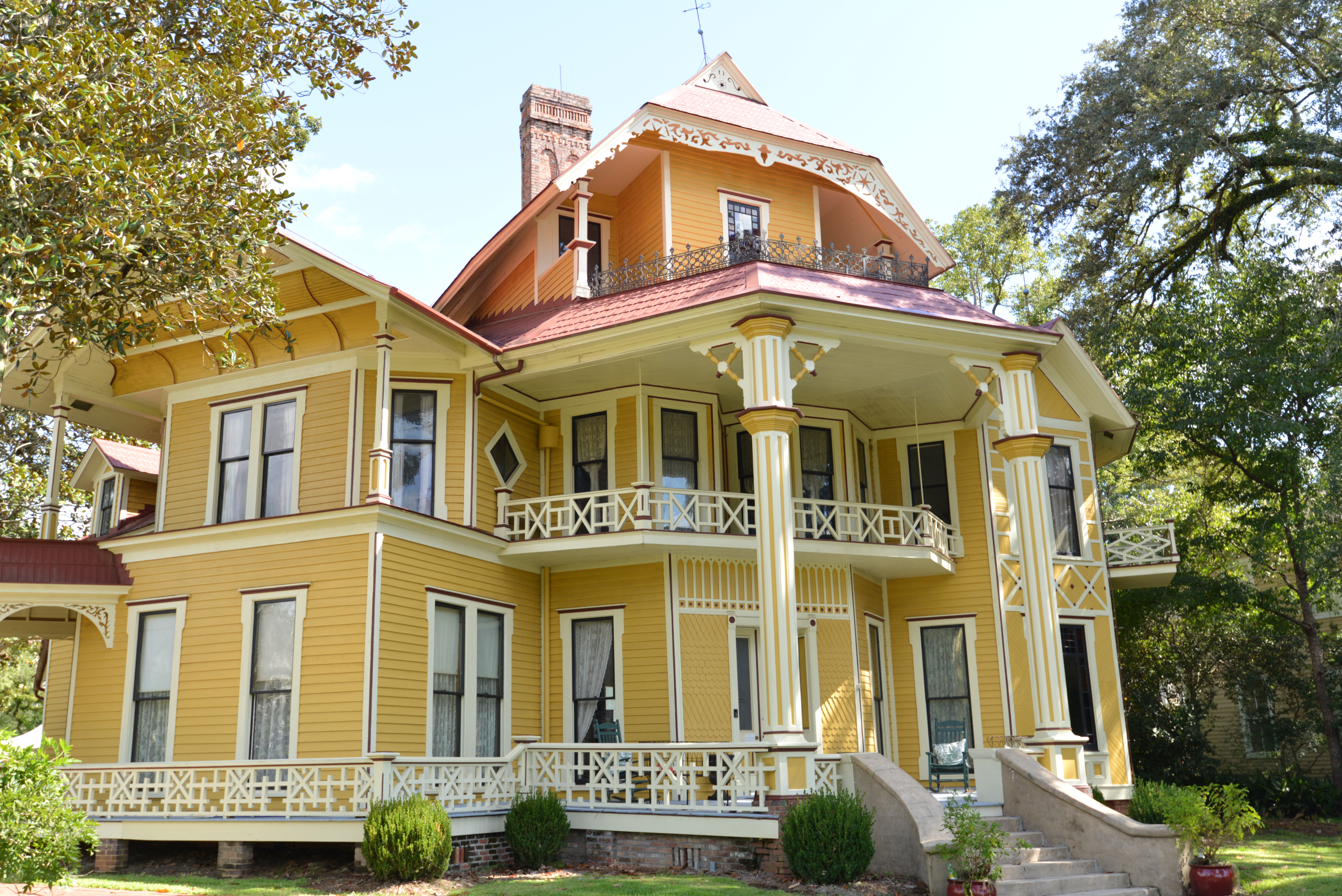

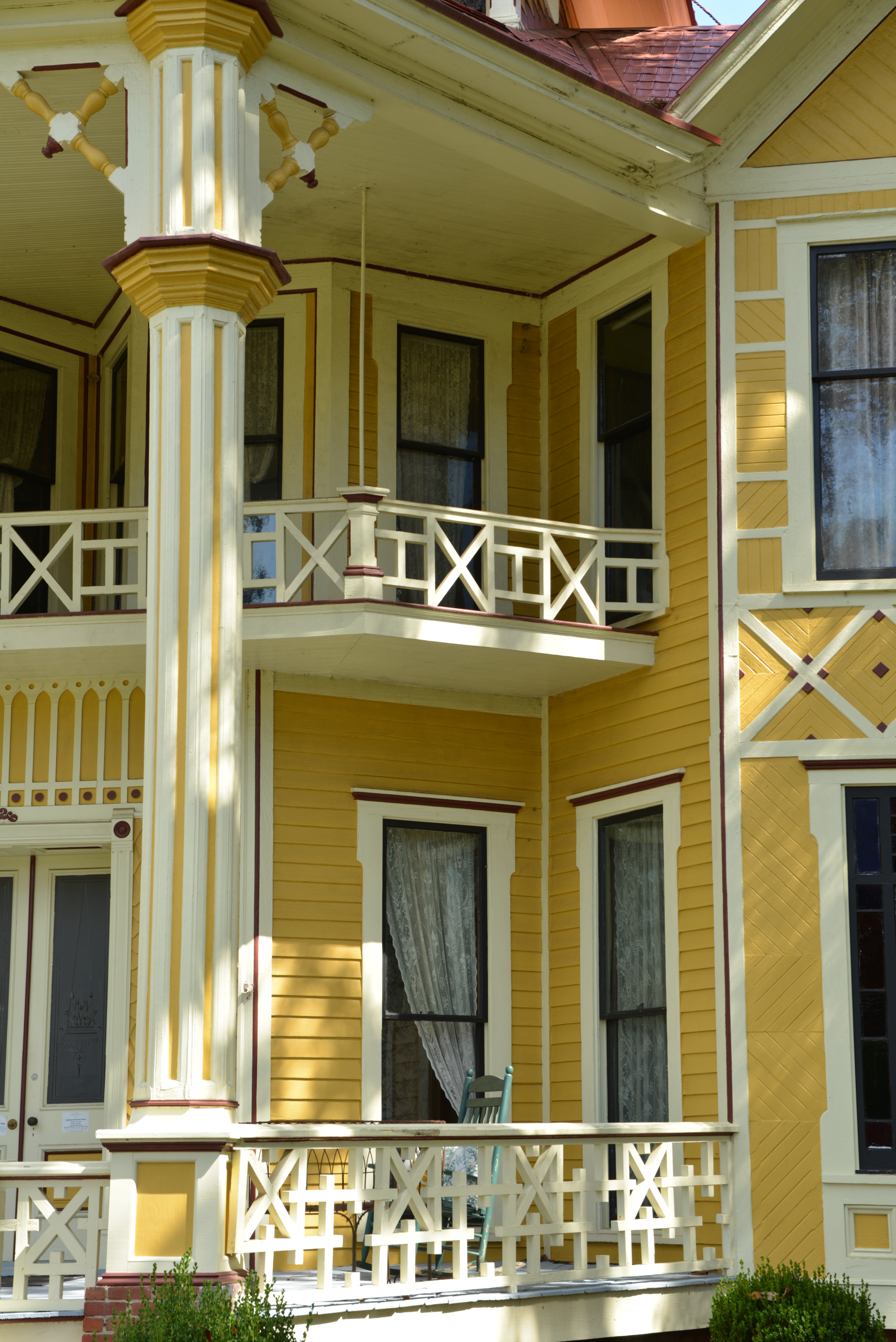

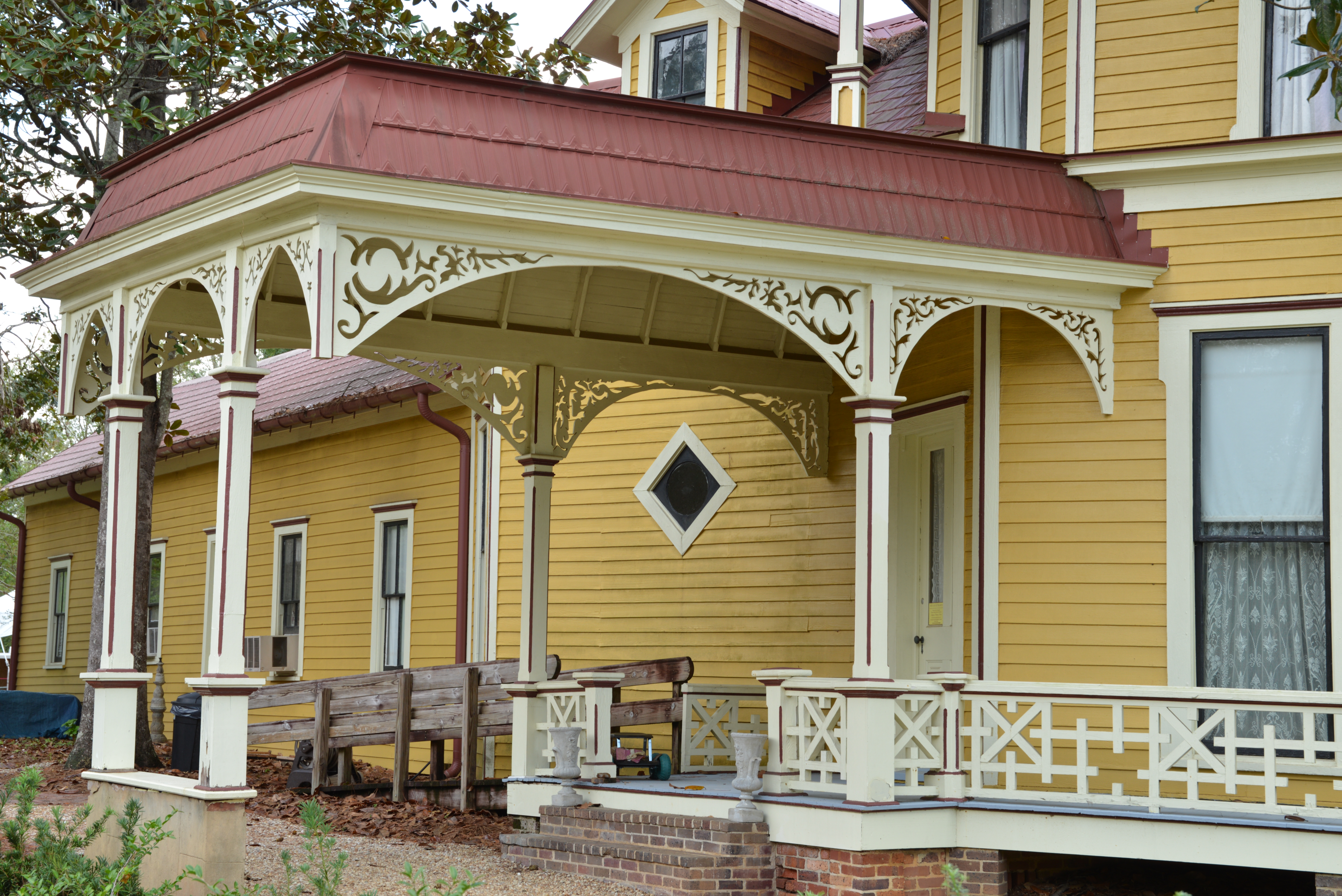

== See also ==
- List of Georgia state parks
- List of National Historic Landmarks in Georgia (U.S. state)
- National Register of Historic Places listings in Thomas County, Georgia
