= Evergreen Congregational Church and School =

Historic church in Georgia, United States

- U.S. National Register of Historic Places
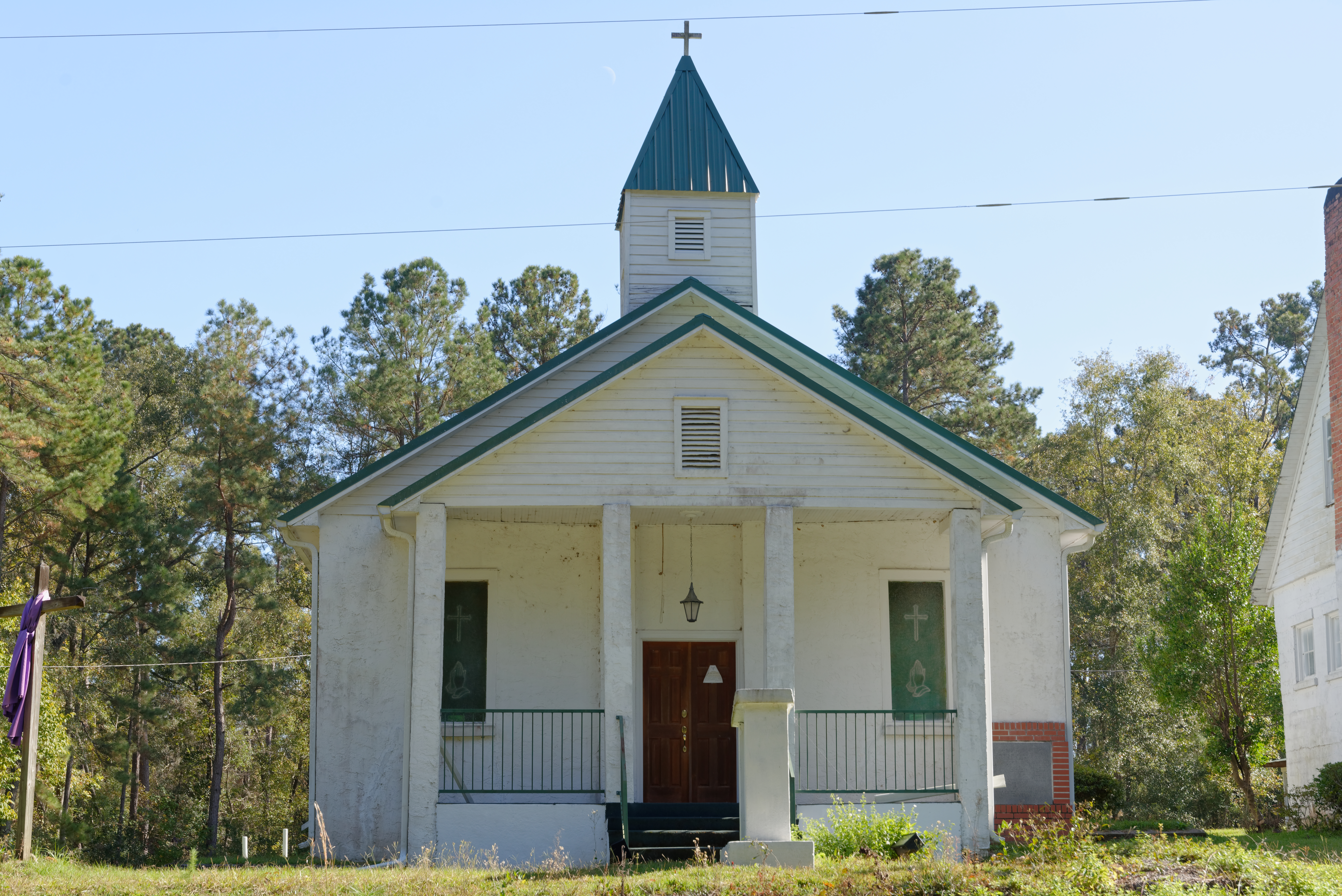
- The church

- Location within Georgia Location within the United States
- Location: 497 Meridian Rd., Beachton, Georgia
- Coordinates: 30.72837°N 84.137°W
- Area: 2 acres (0.81 ha)
- Built: 1911
- Built by: Wright, James E.
- NRHP reference No.: 02001260"National Register Information System". National Register of Historic Places. National Park Service. July 9, 2010.
- Added to NRHP: October 31, 2002

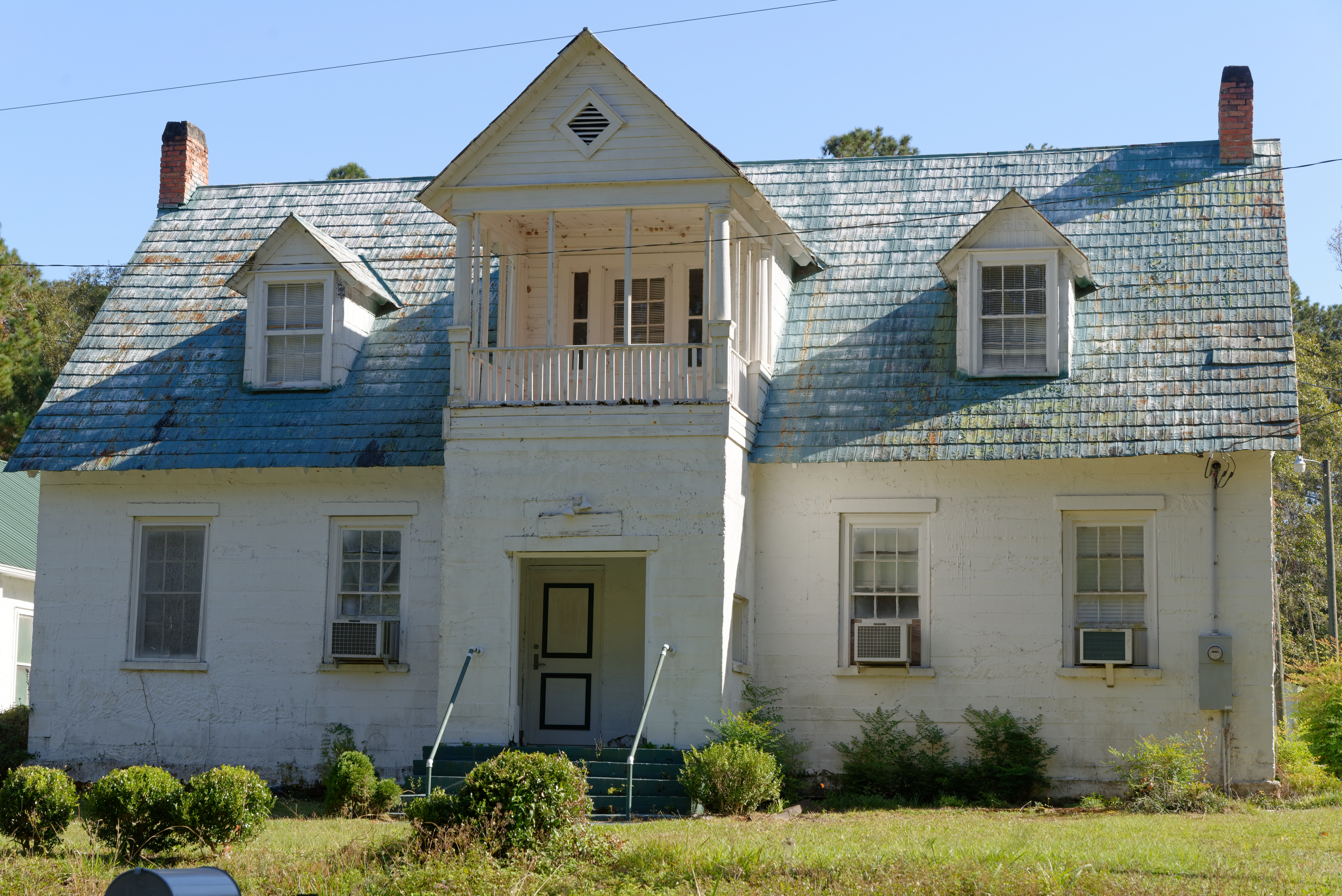
The school

The Evergreen Congregational Church and School is a historic church and school at 497 Meridian Road in Beachton, Georgia. It is notable for its architecture, its association with social history of the area, and its association with civil rights movement leader Andrew Young, who served as pastor from 1957 to 1959. It was added to the National Register of Historic Places in 2002.

== Church ==
The Evergreen Congregational Church was founded in 1903 by a group of Beachton residents and, in 1904, a frame church was built. In 1925, the original church was demolished, and the concrete-block church was completed in 1928. It is a gable-front church with an entrance porch and cupola. The church is typical of African-American churches, with the simple massing of its gable roofed rectangular-shaped sanctuary and in its use of inexpensive materials, such as concrete block and stucco. The rough finish on the poured-concrete walls indicates the work of congregation members and not skilled laborers. Between 1989 and 1991, the congregation built a 30-foot long annex to the rear of the church.

The Evergreen Congregational Church and School are significant because of their association with Civil Rights leader Andrew Young. In his autobiography, An Easy Burden (1996), Young noted that the lessons he learned at Evergreen served him during the struggle for civil rights. During the 1960s, he joined the Southern Christian Leadership Conference, and served as Executive Director under Dr. Martin Luther King, Jr. In 1972, he was elected to Congress.

Reverend William H. Holloway served as the first church pastor, from 1904 until 1910. He was followed by Reverend Henry S. Barnwell (1910-1916), Reverend George W. Hannar (1924-1930), Reverend W. J. Hill (1930-?), Andrew Young (1957-1959). In 1974, Reverend Artis Johnson arrived and remains the current pastor.

It is now known as the Evergreen United Church of Christ.

== School ==
In 1903, Jerry Walden Jr. led a group of community men in erecting a one-room wood school building on a one-acre site that was donated by Please Hawthorne. This was the first school for black children in the area. Walden (who was born in Grady County, Georgia, in 1869, and attended public school in Thomas County, Georgia, and later Morehouse College in Atlanta) was the first African-American teacher in Beachton. He taught in Beachton until his death in 1935. Please Hawthorne was born in 1854 in rural Grady County, and spent much of his life running a general merchandise store in the Beachton area until his death in 1927.

The one-room school was replaced by the current school in 1911. It was designed by congregation member James E. Wright (1887-1972), one of Georgia’s first African American architects who had an architecture degree from Tuskegee University. The school is a one- and one-half-story cruciform-plan building with classrooms on the first floor and quarters for teachers above. The interior of the school remains largely unchanged since it was built.

From the beginning, the American Missionary Association assumed responsibility for the church and school because of negligence by the public schools in the education of African-American children. In 1916, the school was renamed Grady County Training School when the county assumed partial responsibility for the school.

In 1938, the educational programs at Evergreen were moved by the county to another location. The Evergreen school was then used as a community hall for such activities as voter registration drives, meetings with county commissioners, farm agents, home demonstration agents, 4-H Boys and Girls Clubs, and Boy Scouts. The school is currently known as Evergreen Recreation Center and serves as the fellowship hall for Evergreen church.
