= Eudora Plantation =

Historic house in Georgia, United States

- U.S. National Register of Historic Places
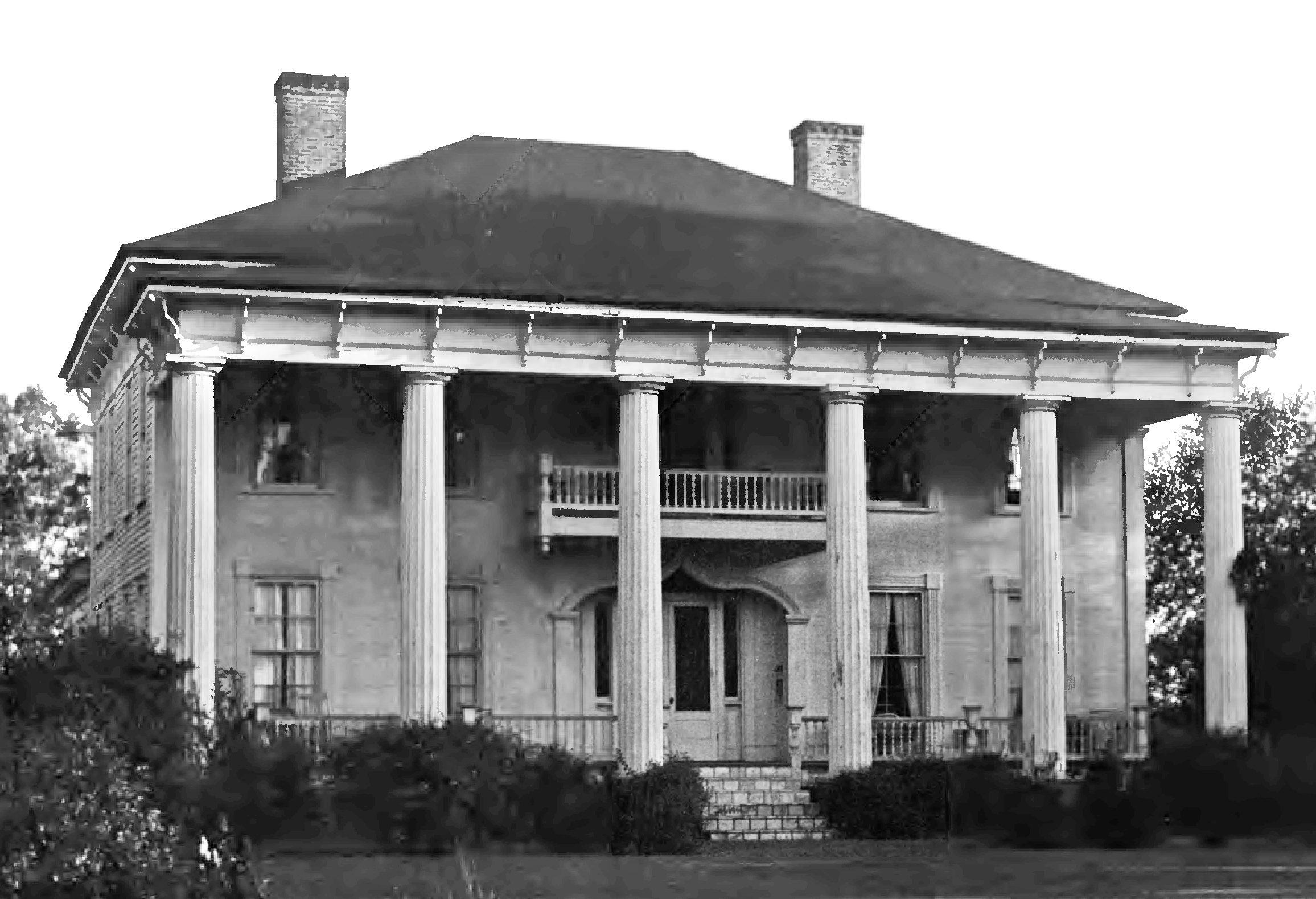
- Nearest city: Quitman, Georgia
- Area: 561.2 acres (227.1 ha)
- Built: 1835; 191 years ago
- Architect: Wind, John
- Architectural style: Greek Revival
- Demolished: 1987; 39 years ago
- NRHP reference No.: 74000662
- Added to NRHP: December 16, 1974

The Eudora Plantation, also known as the Old Jones Place, was a historic building in Brooks County, Georgia. It is believed to have been designed by architect John Wind and built in 1835, though contemporary records are lacking. The HBO movie As Summers Die starring Jamie Lee Curtis and Bette Davis was filmed at the house in 1985.

It was listed on the U.S. National Register of Historic Places in 1974 and destroyed by fire in February 1987.
