= Sasser Farm =

Historic house in Georgia, United States

- U.S. National Register of Historic Places
- Location within Georgia
- Location: Sasser Farm Rd. south of Cairo, Georgia
- Coordinates: 30°47′11″N 84°14′20″W
- Area: 3 acres (1.2 ha)
- Built: 1839
- NRHP reference No.: 83000230
- Added to NRHP: September 8, 1983

The Sasser Farm in Grady County, Georgia, near Cairo, Georgia, was listed on the National Register of Historic Places in 1983. It included nine contributing buildings.

According to its NRHP nomination, it was deemed significant in part as "a good example of the type of small, family-owned farmstead that once abounded in southwest Georgia. From the simple log house and later the "new" house, a farm was maintained where cotton, corn, and livestock were raised. Several county innovations are said to have occurred here including the first dipping vats for cattle, one of the first large, raised concrete silos, and construction of an ice house before ice came into general use. The Sasser Farm truly represents the American frontier dream."

The "new" house was built in 1887. It is a one-story double pen, central hall plan house with a metal roof. An overhanging portion of the roof is supported by four columns.

The old was a log house built in c.1839.

Besides the houses buildings on the site include a wash house, a smokehouse, a cold storage (ice) building, a garage, a corn crib, a mule barn, and a silo.
