= Birdsong Nature Center =

Historic house in Georgia, United States

- Dickey-Birdsong Plantation
- U.S. National Register of Historic Places
- U.S. Historic district
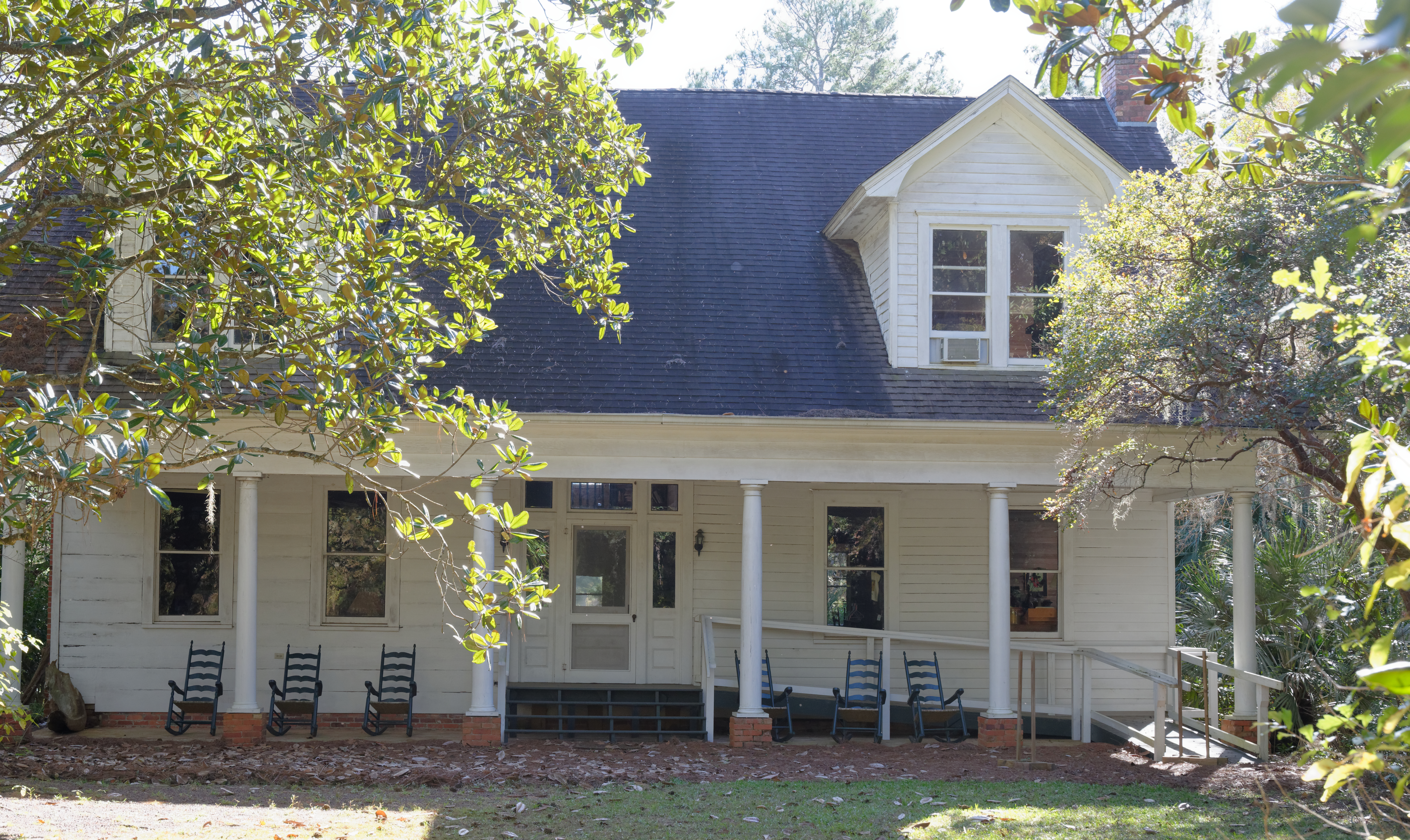
- Dickey-Komarek House

- Location within Georgia Location within the United States
- Location: Meridian Rd., off State Route 93 west of Beachton, Georgia
- Coordinates: 30.70306°N 84.19314°W
- Area: 565 acres (229 ha)
- Built: 1912
- Architectural style: Classical Revival
- NRHP reference No.: 95000741
- Added to NRHP: June 20, 1995

Birdsong Nature Center, formerly the Dickey-Birdsong Plantation, is a 565-acre (229 ha) historic district property. It was listed on the National Register of Historic Places in 1995. It includes four contributing buildings, five contributing structures, and a contributing site. It is a wildlife preserve.

It has a 1912 dwelling, the "Dickey-Komarek House", which includes Classical Revival architectural details, and is a frame one-and-a-half-story building built in 1912 by expanding upon a mid-1800s dogtrot house. It has an 1858 barn and outbuildings built in the 1900s.

The property was purchased from the Dickey family in 1938. It became a site of ecological research and fire experimentation.

The property is now the Birdsong Nature Center on Birdsong Road. Birdsong Nature Center was created as a 501c3 corporation in 1986. Its mission is "to foster awareness, understanding, and appreciation of nature and its interrelationships."
