= Dawson Street Residential Historic District =

Historic district in Georgia, United States

- U.S. National Register of Historic Places
- U.S. Historic district
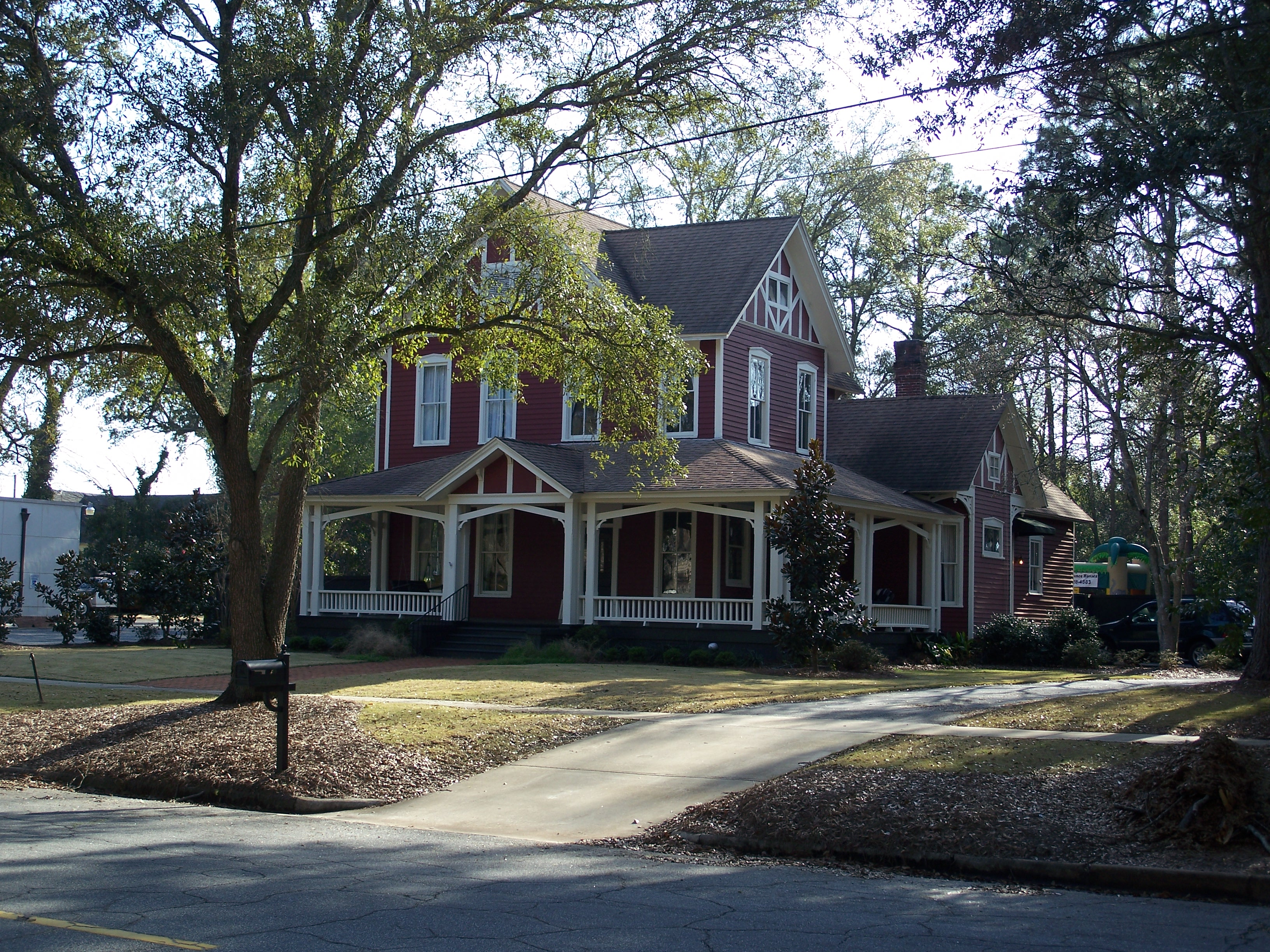
- House on N. Dawson

- Location within Georgia Location within the United States
- Location: Roughly bounded by North Blvd., Madison, Jackson, and Hansell Sts., Thomasville, Georgia
- Coordinates: 30.844167°N 83.981944°W
- Area: 200 acres (0.81 km^{2})
- Architect: Multiple
- Architectural style: Late 19th And 20th Century Revivals, Late Victorian
- NRHP reference No.: 84001251
- Added to NRHP: September 7, 1984

The Dawson Street Residential Historic District, in Thomasville, Georgia, is a 200-acre (0.81 km^{2}) historic district which was listed on the National Register of Historic Places in 1984. It then included 380 contributing buildings and three contributing sites.

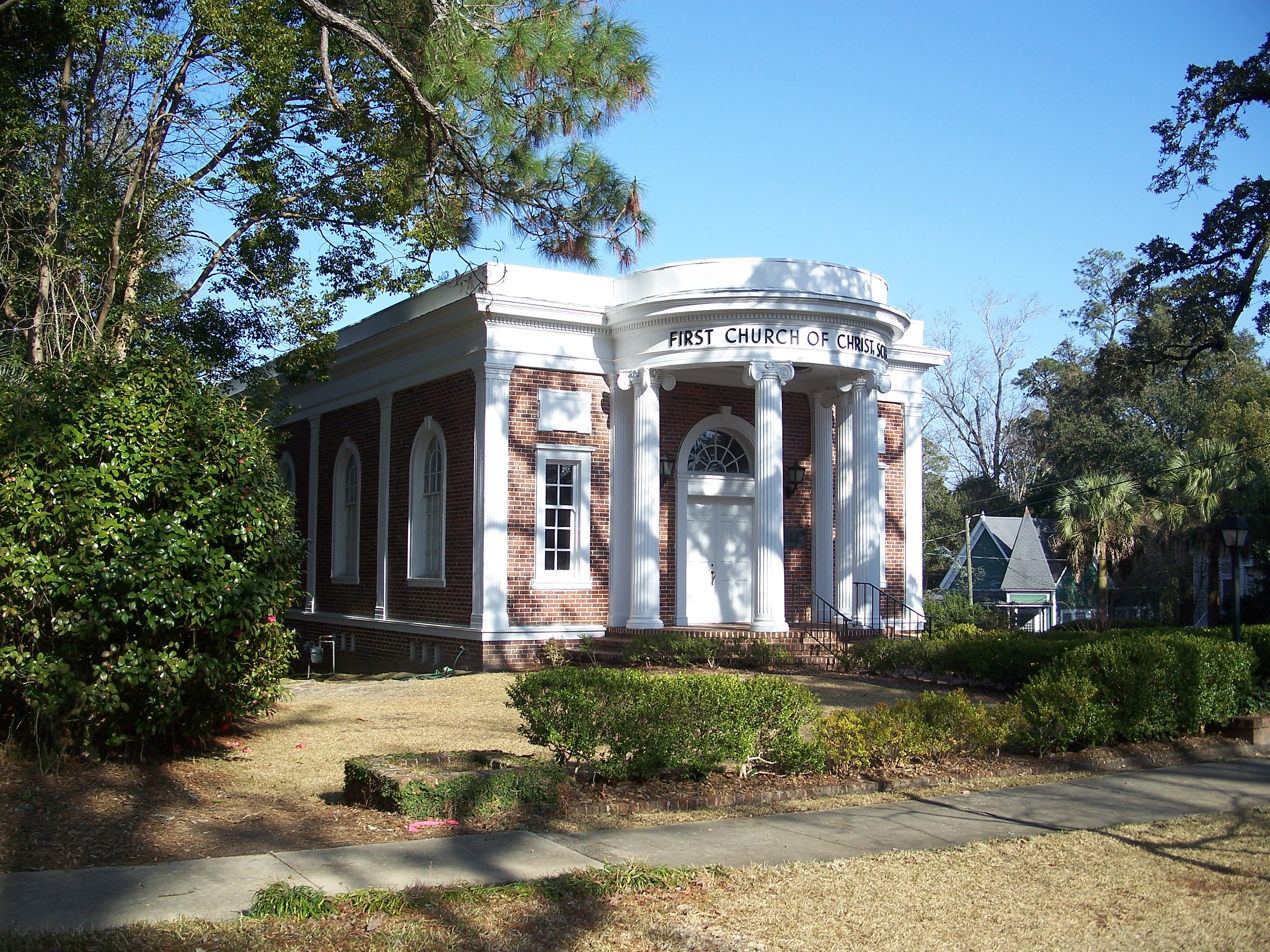
First Church of Christ, Scientist, on N. Dawson St.

It is located to the north of the city's commercial center and its courthouse square. As well as houses, the district includes several churches, two historic cemeteries (one for whites and one for blacks), a historic city park, and pecan orchards associated with some of the houses.

It includes two properties already separately-listed on the National Register:

- Hardy Bryan House (or Carter House), 312 North Broad Street, a Greek Revival house built by a carpenter/builder which is believed to be one of the earliest surviving houses in Thomasville;
- Lapham-Patterson House (1885), 626 North Dawson Street, a National Historic Landmark.

Also notable in the district are:

- several rare examples of single pen houses on Broad Street and Lutten Lane
- Hardaway House (1856), 526 North Dawson Street) designed by builder/architect John Wind
- 312 North Dawson Street (1905), a "concrete stone" structure built as the administration building for Young's Female Academy.
