= David Blackshear =

American general

David Blackshear (January 30, 1764 - 1837) was an American general. Lake Blackshear, Blackshear Road and the city of Blackshear, Georgia, were named in honor him. He authorized road and bridge construction in the area and some 11 forts for defense. He fought in the American Revolution, possibly in the Craven County Regiment of the North Carolina militia. He was reported to have been engaged at the Battle of Moore's Creek Bridge on February 27, 1776 and the Battle of Beaufort in April 1782.

He served as a militia general during the War of 1812.

He also served in the Georgia State Legislature as a senator from Laurens County. His brother Edward Blackshear was associated with Susina Plantation.

General Blackshear was in charge of the troops who constructed Blackshear Road between Hartford, Georgia, and the Flint River during his defense of the threatened invasion of the southern border of Georgia in the War of 1812.

Blackshear is the county seat of Pierce County, Georgia.
