= Brooks County Courthouse (Georgia) =

Historic courthouse in Georgia, US

- U.S. National Register of Historic Places

- Location within Georgia Location within the United States
- Location: Courthouse Sq., Quitman, Georgia
- Coordinates: 30°47′8″N 83°33′37″W
- Area: 2 acres (0.81 ha)
- Built: 1859; 167 years ago
- Architect: Wind, John; Bruce & Morgan
- Architectural style: Renaissance, Romanesque
- MPS: Georgia County Courthouses TR
- NRHP reference No.: 80000976 The
- Added to NRHP: September 18, 1980

The Brooks County Courthouse in Quitman, Georgia is the historic county courthouse of Brooks County, Georgia. The building is an example of Renaissance Revival and Romanesque Revival architecture. It underwent extensive renovations in 1892. It was listed on the National Register of Historic Places in 1980.

== History ==
The Brooks County Courthouse was built from 1859–64; it was designed by architect John Wind. Because of shortages of material and labor, the courthouse was one of only two courthouses in Georgia built during the Civil War; the other is the Banks County Courthouse in Homer. Because of the war, plans for the courthouse were substantially scaled back; a proposed parapet, cupola, roof balustrade, ornate courtroom columns, and porticos on the ends of the building were never built. The original courthouse resembles another Wind courthouse, the Thomas County Courthouse at Thomasville (1858), as well as Elam Alexander's Bibb County Courthouse (1829) in Macon; all three courthouses are in a brick vernacular style. The county paid for the building with $14,985 in Confederate money, which soon became worthless.

The building was remodeled in 1892, with Bruce & Morgan as architects, one of sixteen Georgia courthouses designed by the firm between 1882 and 1898. The remodeled courthouse is Italian Renaissance Revival, with elements of Richardsonian Romanesque in the massive twin arches at the main entrance and Queen Anne style in the fenestration.
