= Hardy Bryan House =

Historic house in Georgia, United States

- U.S. National Register of Historic Places
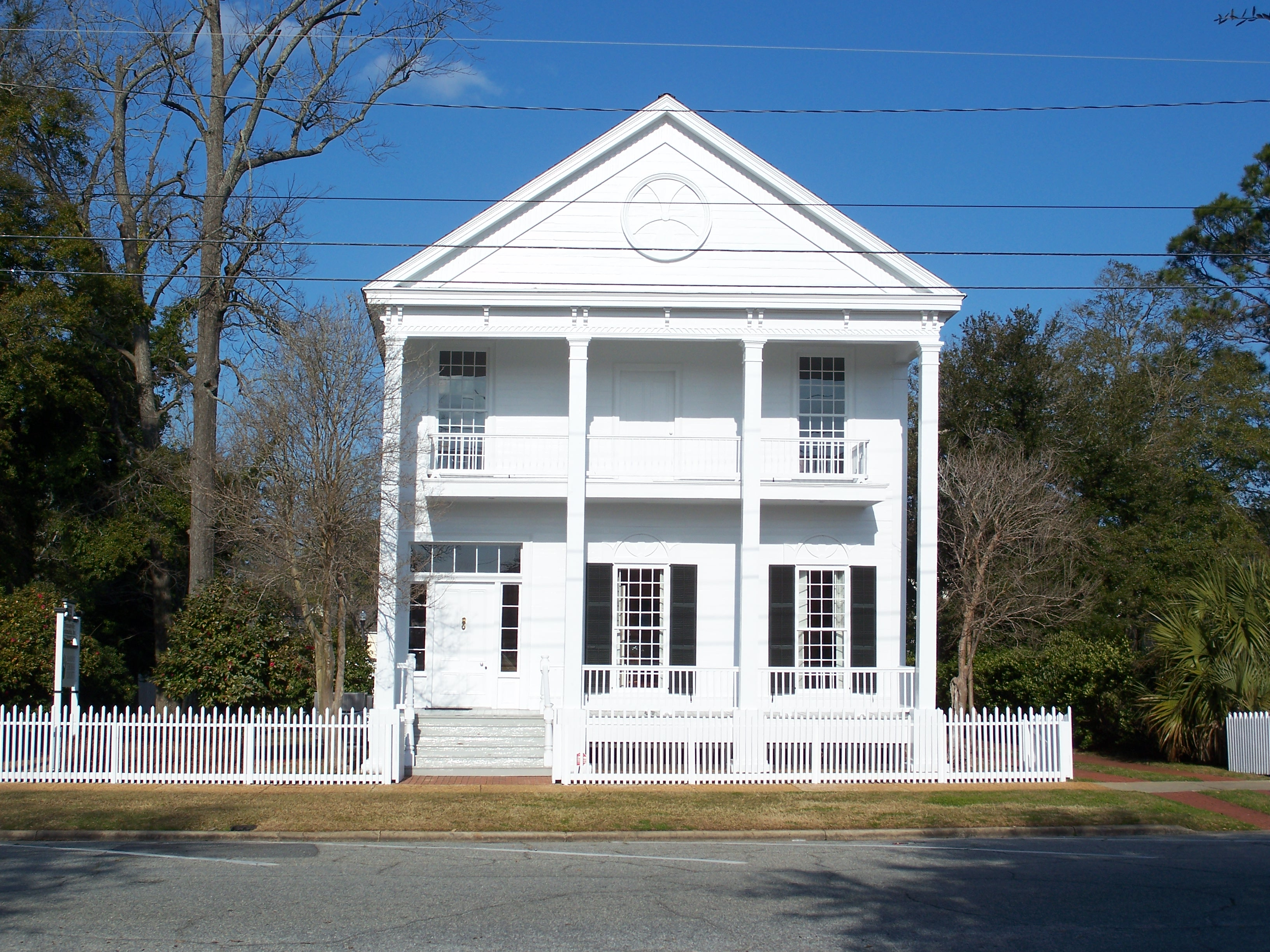

- Location within Georgia Location within the United States
- Location: 312 N. Broad St., Thomasville, Georgia
- Coordinates: 30°50′24″N 83°58′54″W
- Area: 0.3 acres (0.12 ha)
- Built: 1833
- Architectural style: Plantation style
- NRHP reference No.: 70000218
- Added to NRHP: August 12, 1970

The Hardy Bryan House, also known as Cater House, in Thomasville, Georgia, was built in c.1833. It is a well-preserved example of an antebellum plantation house. It was listed on the National Register of Historic Places in 1970. It is also a contributing building in the National Register-listed Dawson Street Residential Historic District.

It is a two-and-a-half-story Plantation Style house with a two-story portico supported by four square columns. As of 1970, all of its windows were 16 over 16, many with their original glass.
