= Greenwood Plantation (Georgia) =

Historic house in Georgia, United States

- U.S. National Register of Historic Places
- U.S. Historic district
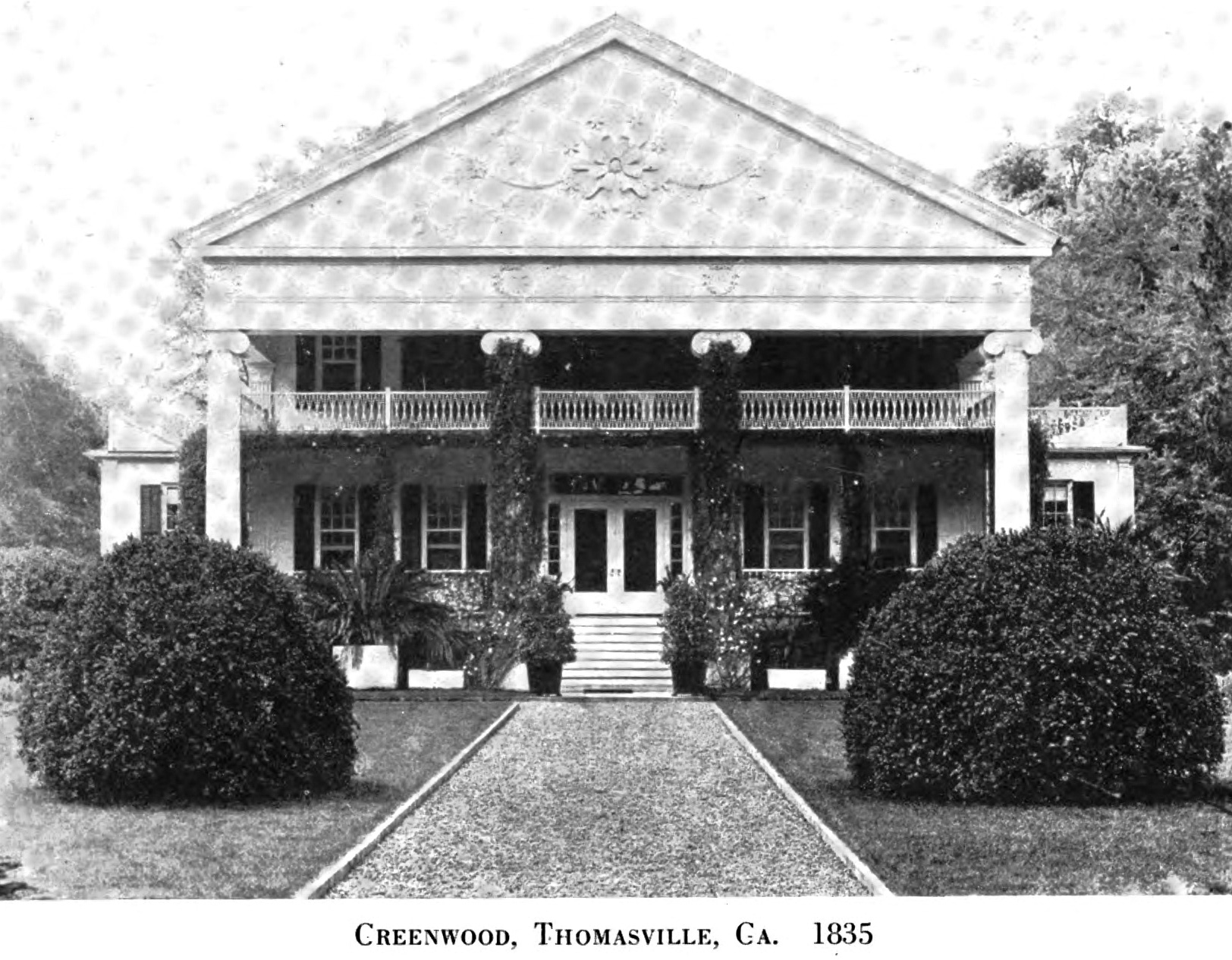

- Location within Georgia Location within the United States
- Location: GA 84, Thomasville, Thomas County, Georgia, U.S.
- Coordinates: 30.854231°N 84.020920°W
- Area: 1,400 acres (570 ha)
- Built: c.1838, 1899
- Architect: John Wind (original); McKim, Mead & White (1899 expansion)
- Architectural style: Greek Revival
- NRHP reference No.: 76000650
- Added to NRHP: May 13, 1976

Greenwood Plantation is a plantation in the Red Hills Region of southern Georgia, just west of Thomasville. Its Greek Revival main house was built in 1838 and expanded in 1899. The plantation includes 5,200 acres of forest used for quail hunting with 1,000 acres of old-growth longleaf pines, some up to 500 years old.

It was listed on the U.S. National Register of Historic Places in 1976. The property then included 1400 acres, nine contributing buildings, and four other contributing structures.

== History ==
The original Greek Revival mansion on the property was designed by British architect John Wind and built about 1838 for Thomas and Lavinia Jones. The house was completed in 1844, and the Jones family occupied the plantation until it was sold in 1889 to S.R. Van Duzer of New York. Van Duzer later sold the home to Col. Oliver Hazard Payne, who bequeathed the home in 1916 to his nephew, the millionaire and horse racing enthusiast Payne Whitney. In 1899, Payne engaged architect Stanford White of the firm McKim, Mead & White to add two small, symmetric side wings and additional living and kitchen space in the rear of the main house.

After Payne's death, Greenwood was inherited in 1944 by his son Jock Whitney, who was responsible for arranging the financing for the movie version of Gone with the Wind, which premiered in Atlanta in December 1939, with Jock Whitney in attendance. The plantation reportedly served as "a model of southern elegance for the movie."

In 1942, Jock married Betsey Cushing, former wife of James Roosevelt. The Whitneys, who also owned a number of other homes in New York and England, regularly visited Greenwood as their winter home, often bringing their thoroughbred race horses with them. Jock served as the American ambassador to the Court of St. James's from 1957 to 1961 under President Dwight Eisenhower, who while a visitor at Greenwood enjoyed quail and turkey hunting. Many other famous friends of the Whitneys stayed at Greenwood over the years, including the Duke and Duchess of Windsor and Fred Astaire.

In February 1964, shortly after the assassination of her husband, Jacqueline Kennedy spent several weeks at the plantation as a guest of the Whitneys, who provided her a much-needed refuge from media attention. Mrs. Kennedy's visit again in 1967 provided some fodder for the tabloids of the day as Lord Harlech, the ambassador to the US from the Court of St. James's, was also a guest during her stay.

The main house was renovated and restored in 1965, and redecorated by society decorator Sister Parish in 1993; but just when the redecoration had been completed, a fire broke out, gutting the interior but leaving the external walls intact.

Jock died in 1982, and his widow in 1998; upon her death, she left the plantation to the family's Greentree Foundation, who maintained the property according to a conservation plan created by her and expert consultants. In 2013, the foundation offered the plantation for sale.

== See also ==
- National Register of Historic Places listings in Thomas County, Georgia
