= Thomas County Courthouse (Georgia) =

Historic courthouse in the US

- U.S. National Register of Historic Places
- U.S. National Historic Landmark District – Contributing property
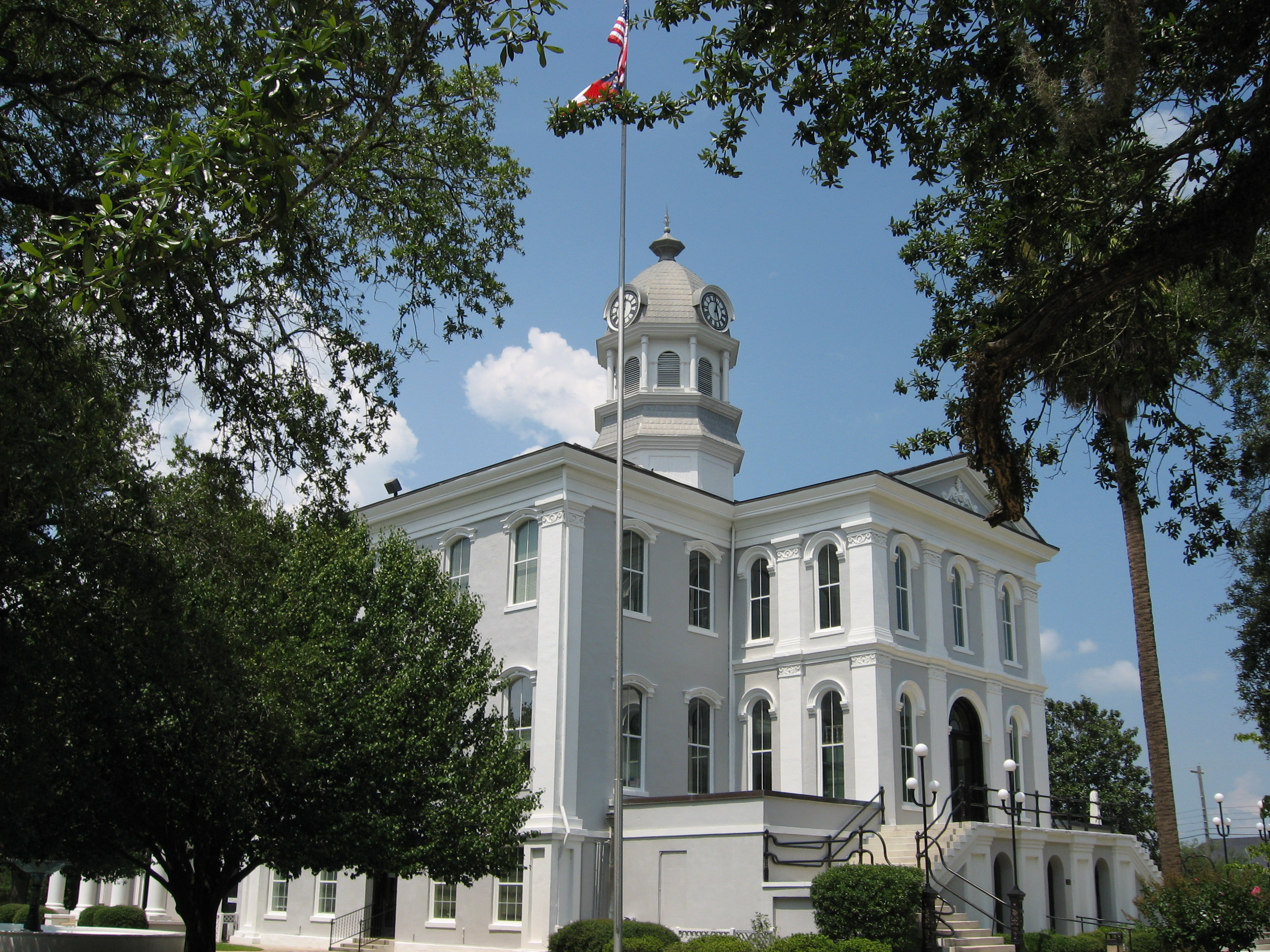

- Location within Georgia Location within the United States
- Interactive map showing the location of Thomas County Courthouse
- Location: Thomasville, Georgia
- Coordinates: 30°50′20″N 83°58′55″W
- Built: 1858
- Architect: Wind, John
- Part of: Thomasville Commercial Historic District (ID84001258)
- NRHP reference No.: 70000224
- Added to NRHP: June 22, 1970

The Thomas County Courthouse is an historic government building built in 1858 and located on North Broad Street in Thomasville, Georgia, the seat of Thomas County. It was designed by architect John Wind.

It was added to the National Register of Historic Places on June 22, 1970.

It is also a contributing building in the NRHP-listed Thomasville Commercial Historic District.

== See also ==
- National Register of Historic Places listings in Thomas County, Georgia
