= Pebble Hill Plantation =

Historic house in Georgia, United States

- U.S. National Register of Historic Places
- U.S. Historic district
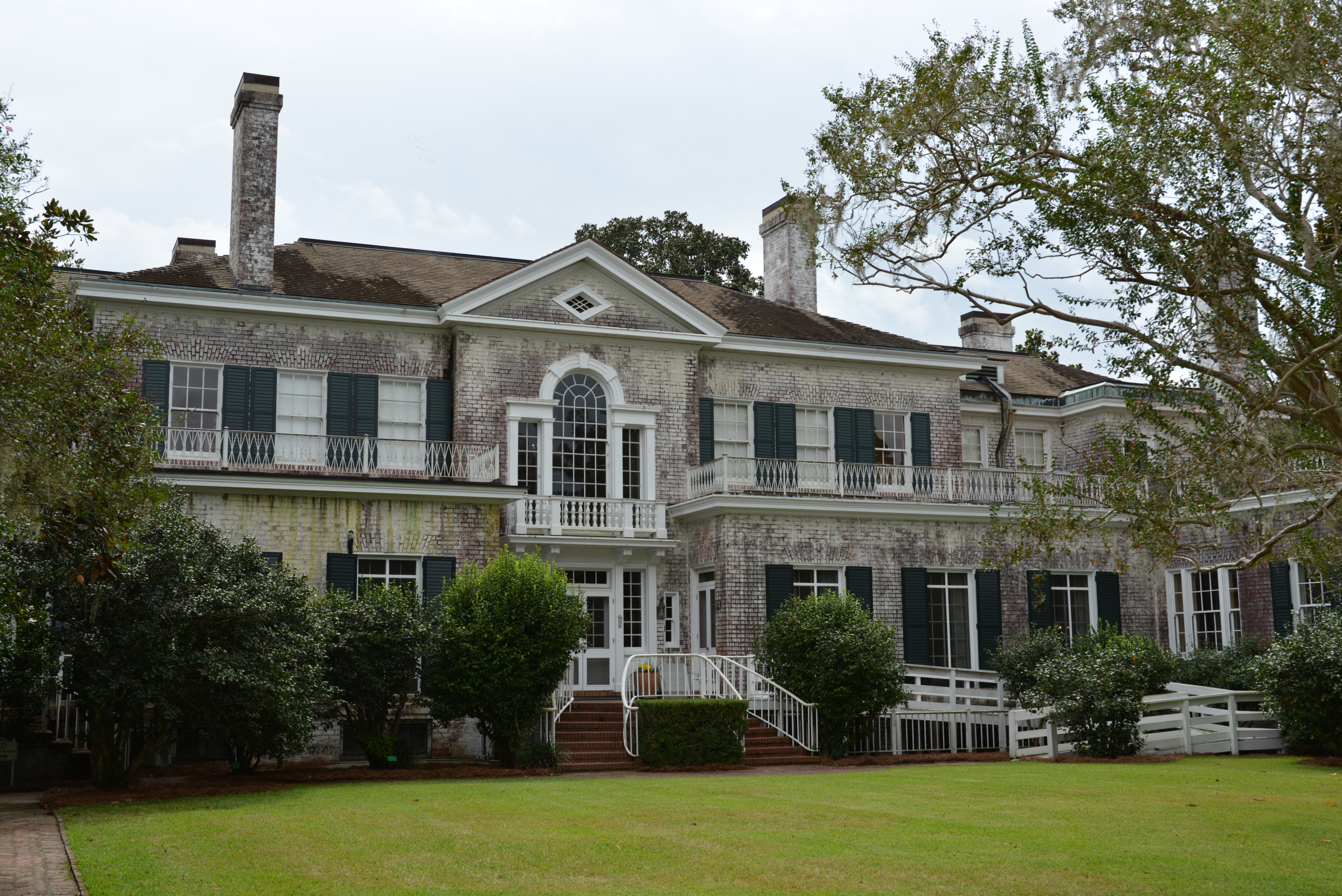

- Location within Georgia Location within the United States
- Nearest city: Thomasville, Georgia
- Coordinates: 30.78022°N 84.06386°W
- Area: 3,000 acres (1,200 ha)
- Built: 1934
- Architect: Abram Garfield
- Architectural style: Colonial Revival, Classical Revival
- NRHP reference No.: 90000146
- Added to NRHP: February 23, 1990

Pebble Hill Plantation is a plantation and museum located near Thomasville, Georgia. The plantation is listed on the National Register of Historic Places.

== History ==
The plantation was established in the 1820s, when Thomas Jefferson Johnson built the first house. After his death, the plantation was inherited by his daughter, Julia Ann, and her husband, John H. Mitchell. They hired English architect John Wind to design a new mansion. The people enslaved by the family grew cotton, tobacco and rice.

The plantation was purchased by Howard Melville Hanna in 1896. It was passed on to his daughter Kate in 1901, who turned it into a hunting estate. After the main house burned down in 1934, architect Abram Garfield designed the new mansion, completed in 1936. After Kate's death, the plantation was inherited by her daughter, Elizabeth "Pansy" Ireland.

Through the Pebble Hill Foundation endowed by Pansy Ireland, the plantation is open to the public.

The Pebble Hill Plantation Film Collection at the University of Georgia's Brown Media Archives is thought to contain the earliest known moving image recording of Georgia, dating to 1917.

== See also ==
- Ochlocknee Missionary Baptist Church, a church founded by local enslaved people in 1848, originally located on the outskirts of Pebble Hill Plantation
