= Grady County, Georgia =

County in Georgia, United States

- County
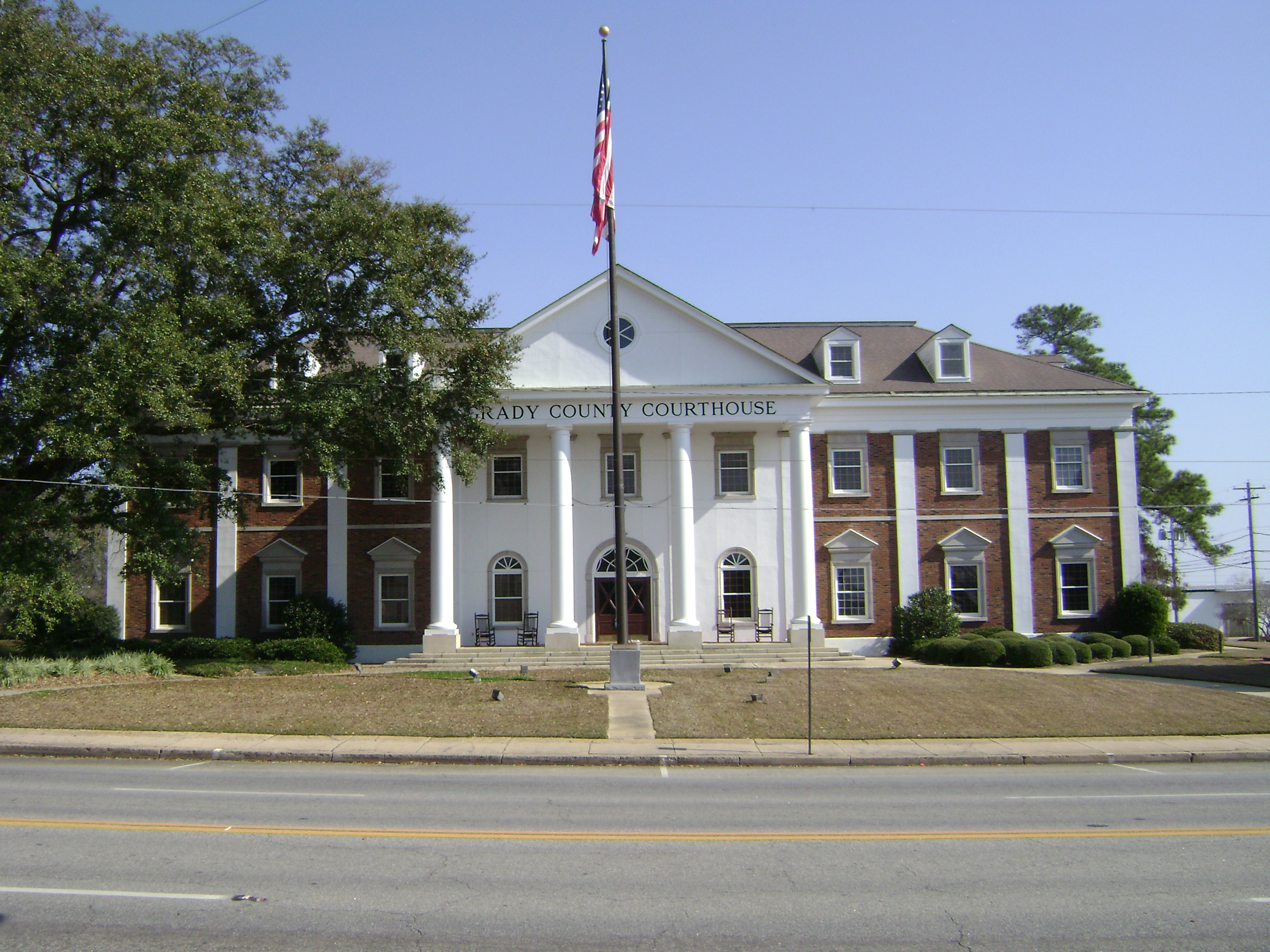
- Grady County Courthouse

- Logo

- Location within the U.S. state of Georgia
- Coordinates: 30°53′N 84°14′W
- Country: United States
- State: Georgia
- Founded: August 17, 1905; 121 years ago
- Named for: Henry W. Grady
- Seat: Cairo
- Largest city: Cairo

Area
  - Total: 460 sq mi (1,200 km^{2})
  - Land: 455 sq mi (1,180 km^{2})
  - Water: 5.7 sq mi (15 km^{2}) 1.2%

Population (2020)
  - Total: 26,236
  - Estimate (2025): 26,590 ▲
  - Density: 58/sq mi (22/km^{2})
- Time zone: UTC−5 (Eastern)
  - Summer (DST): UTC−4 (EDT)
- Congressional district: 2nd
- Website: gradycountyga.gov

Grady County is a county located in the U.S. state of Georgia. As of the 2020 census, the population was 26,236. The county seat is Cairo.

== History ==
Grady County was created by an act of the Georgia General Assembly on August 17, 1905, from portions of Decatur and Thomas counties. The county is named for Henry W. Grady, editor of the Atlanta Constitution and noted orator.

== Geography ==
According to the U.S. Census Bureau, the county has a total area of 460 square miles (1,200 km^{2}), of which 455 square miles (1,180 km^{2}) is land and 5.7 square miles (15 km^{2}) (1.2%) is water.

The bulk of Grady County, centered on Cairo, is located on the Upper Ochlockonee River sub-basin of the larger Ochlockonee River basin. The county's northwestern corner is located in the Lower Flint River sub-basin of the ACF River Basin (Apalachicola-Chattahoochee-Flint River Basin). Grady County's western border, from Whigham south, and all of its southern border, is located in the Lower Ochlockonee River sub-basin of the same Ochlockonee River basin. Finally, a very small chunk of the county's southeastern portion, bisected by U.S. Route 319, is located in the Apalachee Bay-St. Marks sub-basin of the Ochlockonee River basin.

Grady County includes part of the Red Hills Region.

=== Major highways ===
- U.S. Route 84 / State Route 38
  - State Route 38 Spur
- U.S. Route 319 / State Route 35
- State Route 93
- State Route 111
- State Route 112
- State Route 188
- State Route 262

=== Adjacent counties ===
- Mitchell County - north
- Thomas County - east
- Leon County, Florida - south
- Gadsden County, Florida - southwest
- Decatur County - west

== Communities ==
=== Cities ===
- Cairo
- Whigham

=== Census-designated place ===
- Calvary

=== Unincorporated communities ===
- Beachton
- Spence

== Demographics ==
Historical population
Census	Pop.	Note	%±
1910	18,457		—
1920	20,306		10.0%
1930	19,200		−5.4%
1940	19,654		2.4%
1950	18,928		−3.7%
1960	18,015		−4.8%
1970	17,826		−1.0%
1980	19,845		11.3%
1990	20,279		2.2%
2000	23,659		16.7%
2010	25,011		5.7%
2020	26,236		4.9%
2025 (est.)	26,590	▲	1.3%
U.S. Decennial Census; 1790-1880 1890-1910; 1920-1930 1930-1940; 1940-1950 1960-1980; 1980-2000 2010

=== Racial and ethnic composition ===
Grady County, Georgia – Racial and ethnic composition Note: the US Census treats Hispanic/Latino as an ethnic category. This table excludes Latinos from the racial categories and assigns them to a separate category. Hispanics/Latinos may be of any race.
Race / Ethnicity (NH = Non-Hispanic)	Pop 1980	Pop 1990	Pop 2000	Pop 2010	Pop 2020	% 1980	% 1990	% 2000	% 2010	% 2020
White alone (NH)	13,354	13,538	14,954	14,879	14,715	67.29%	66.76%	63.21%	59.49%	56.09%
Black or African American alone (NH)	6,214	6,356	7,074	7,129	7,285	31.31%	31.34%	29.90%	28.50%	27.77%
Native American or Alaska Native alone (NH)	108	75	185	135	89	0.54%	0.37%	0.78%	0.54%	0.34%
Asian alone (NH)	17	19	72	94	110	0.09%	0.09%	0.30%	0.38%	0.42%
Native Hawaiian or Pacific Islander alone (NH)	x	x	1	10	6	x	x	0.00%	0.04%	0.02%
Other race alone (NH)	5	2	5	31	86	0.03%	0.01%	0.02%	0.12%	0.33%
Mixed race or Multiracial (NH)	x	x	146	233	672	x	x	0.62%	0.93%	2.56%
Hispanic or Latino (any race)	147	289	1,222	2,500	3,273	0.74%	1.43%	5.17%	10.00%	12.48%
Total	19,845	20,279	23,659	25,011	26,236	100.00%	100.00%	100.00%	100.00%	100.00%

=== 2020 census ===
As of the 2020 census, the county had a population of 26,236, along with 10,316 households and 6,320 families residing there.

The median age was 40.6 years, 23.9% of residents were under the age of 18, and 19.1% of residents were 65 years of age or older; for every 100 females there were 92.4 males, and for every 100 females age 18 and over there were 89.9 males age 18 and over.

39.4% of residents lived in urban areas, while 60.6% lived in rural areas.

The racial makeup of the county was 57.4% White, 28.0% Black or African American, 1.0% American Indian and Alaska Native, 0.5% Asian, 0.0% Native Hawaiian and Pacific Islander, 8.0% from some other race, and 5.1% from two or more races. Hispanic or Latino residents of any race comprised 12.5% of the population.

Of those households, 32.0% had children under the age of 18 living with them and 31.2% had a female householder with no spouse or partner present. About 27.2% of all households were made up of individuals and 12.9% had someone living alone who was 65 years of age or older.

There were 11,539 housing units, of which 10.6% were vacant. Among occupied housing units, 64.2% were owner-occupied and 35.8% were renter-occupied. The homeowner vacancy rate was 0.9% and the rental vacancy rate was 7.1%.

== Education ==
Grady County Schools operates six public schools, including Cairo High School.

== Politics ==
As of the 2020s, Grady County is a Republican stronghold, voting 68.9% for Donald Trump in 2024. For elections to the United States House of Representatives, Grady County is part of Georgia's 1st congressional district, currently represented by Buddy Carter. For elections to the Georgia State Senate, Grady County is part of District 11. For elections to the Georgia House of Representatives, Grady County is part of District 171.

United States presidential election results for Grady County, Georgia
Year	Republican		Democratic		Third party(ies)	
Year	No.	%	No.	%	No.	%
1912	8	1.66%	452	93.97%	21	4.37%
1916	84	10.53%	675	84.59%	39	4.89%
1920	232	20.73%	887	79.27%	0	0.00%
1924	100	6.35%	1,449	92.06%	25	1.59%
1928	439	27.25%	1,172	72.75%	0	0.00%
1932	60	2.66%	2,184	96.89%	10	0.44%
1936	163	8.91%	1,659	90.71%	7	0.38%
1940	224	13.20%	1,461	86.09%	12	0.71%
1944	223	11.84%	1,661	88.16%	0	0.00%
1948	244	11.19%	1,516	69.54%	420	19.27%
1952	643	18.77%	2,782	81.23%	0	0.00%
1956	496	15.53%	2,697	84.47%	0	0.00%
1960	592	18.90%	2,541	81.10%	0	0.00%
1964	2,983	61.25%	1,887	38.75%	0	0.00%
1968	561	9.67%	1,425	24.56%	3,817	65.78%
1972	3,732	81.02%	874	18.98%	0	0.00%
1976	1,209	24.34%	3,758	75.66%	0	0.00%
1980	2,018	39.44%	3,023	59.08%	76	1.49%
1984	3,886	63.22%	2,261	36.78%	0	0.00%
1988	2,989	61.10%	1,883	38.49%	20	0.41%
1992	2,370	39.28%	2,520	41.77%	1,143	18.95%
1996	2,674	43.23%	2,862	46.27%	649	10.49%
2000	3,894	58.09%	2,721	40.59%	88	1.31%
2004	5,068	61.80%	3,092	37.70%	41	0.50%
2008	5,775	61.63%	3,539	37.77%	57	0.61%
2012	5,924	62.93%	3,419	36.32%	70	0.74%
2016	6,053	65.33%	3,013	32.52%	199	2.15%
2020	7,034	65.70%	3,619	33.80%	54	0.50%
2024	7,385	68.90%	3,290	30.70%	43	0.40%

United States Senate election results for Grady County, Georgia2
Year	Republican		Democratic		Third party(ies)	
Year	No.	%	No.	%	No.	%
2020	6,969	65.87%	3,465	32.75%	146	1.38%
2020	6,229	66.78%	3,099	33.22%	0	0.00%

United States Senate election results for Grady County, Georgia3
Year	Republican		Democratic		Third party(ies)	
Year	No.	%	No.	%	No.	%
2020	3,475	33.41%	1,406	13.52%	5,519	53.07%
2020	6,226	66.75%	3,102	33.25%	0	0.00%
2022	5,638	67.84%	2,573	30.96%	100	1.20%
2022	5,067	67.42%	2,449	32.58%	0	0.00%

Georgia Gubernatorial election results for Grady County
Year	Republican		Democratic		Third party(ies)	
Year	No.	%	No.	%	No.	%
2022	5,884	70.54%	2,422	29.04%	35	0.42%

== See also ==
- National Register of Historic Places listings in Grady County, Georgia
- List of counties in Georgia
