= Beachton, Georgia =

- Unincorporated community
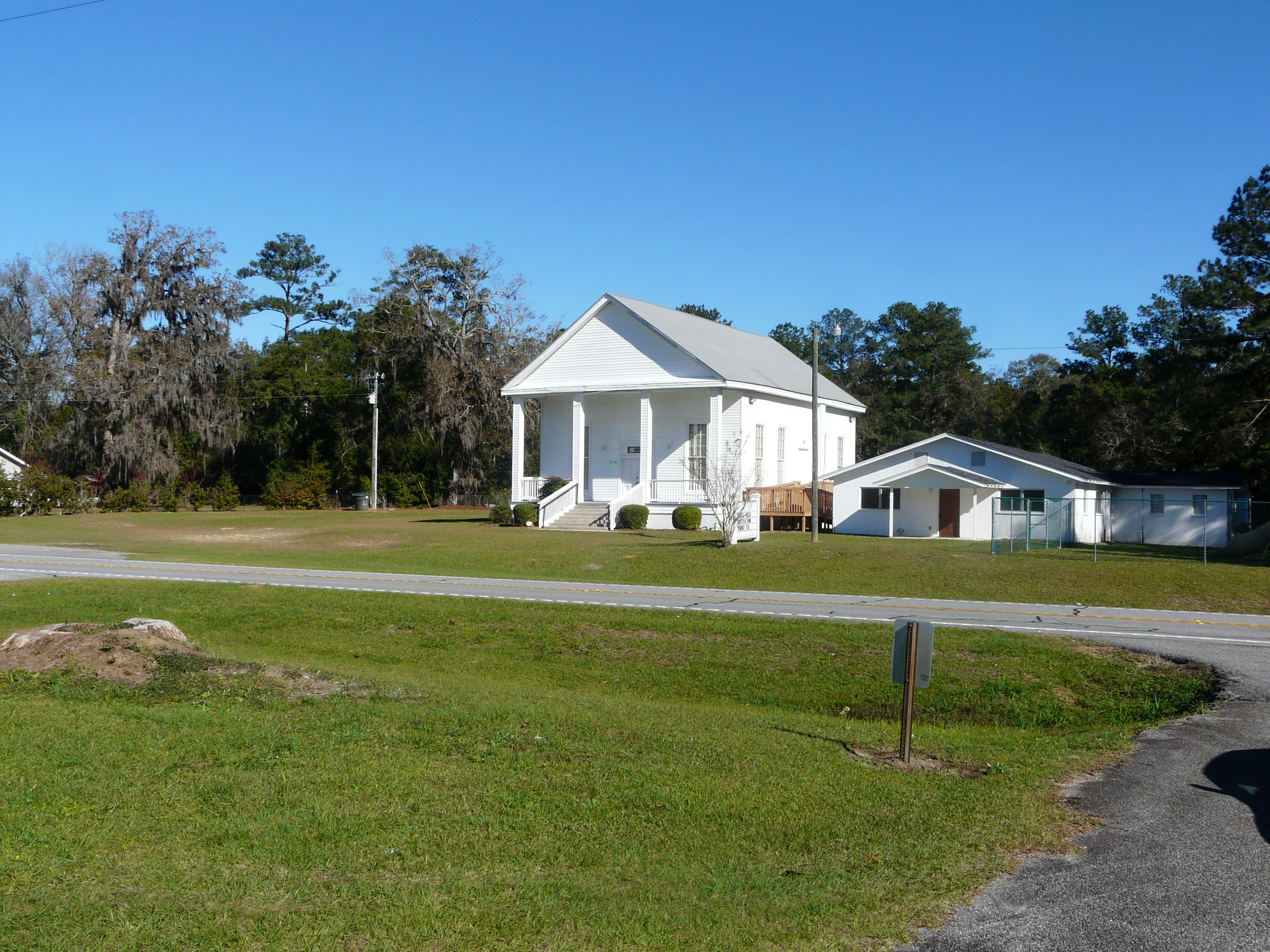
- Primera Iglesia Bautista Hispana de Tallahassee

- Location within Georgia Location within the United States
- Coordinates: 30°43′38″N 84°08′23″W
- Country: United States
- State: Georgia
- County: Grady
- Elevation: 276 ft (84 m)
- Time zone: UTC-5 (Eastern (EST))
  - Summer (DST): UTC-4 (EDT)
- Area code: 229
- GNIS feature ID: 326174

Beachton is an unincorporated community in Grady County, Georgia, United States. It is the location of Susina Plantation, which is listed on the U.S. National Register of Historic Places.
