= National Register of Historic Places listings in Thomas County, Georgia =

This is a list of properties and districts in Thomas County, Georgia that are listed on the National Register of Historic Places (NRHP).

This National Park Service list is complete through NPS recent listings posted March 21, 2025.

== Current listings ==
	Name on the Register	Image	Date listed	Location	City or town	Description
1	D. B. Anderson and Company Building	D. B. Anderson and Company Building	August 19, 1982 (#82002485)	E. Railroad and Brayton Sts. 30°58′28″N 84°03′14″W	Ochlocknee	
2	B'nai Israel Synagogue and Cemetery	B'nai Israel Synagogue and Cemetery	October 14, 1997 (#97001193)	210 S. Crawford St. 30°51′06″N 83°59′16″W	Thomasville	
3	Bethany Congregational Church	Bethany Congregational Church	March 7, 1985 (#85000453)	1122 Lester St. 30°49′13″N 83°59′10″W	Thomasville	
4	Joe M. Beutell House	Joe M. Beutell House	August 29, 1991 (#91001158)	101 Montrose Dr. 30°50′54″N 83°58′16″W	Thomasville	
5	Birdwood	Birdwood	May 2, 1986 (#86000917)	Millpond Rd. and Pinetree Blvd. 30°48′54″N 83°57′52″W	Thomasville	On the campus of Thomas University
6	Boston Historic District	Boston Historic District	May 1, 2007 (#07000375)	Roughly bounded by US 84, Roundtree and S. Oak Sts, Washington St. and W. Jefferson and W. Railroad Sts. 30°47′31″N 83°47′24″W	Boston	
7	Box Hall Plantation		November 16, 1989 (#89002015)	Lower Cairo Rd. at Pinetree Blvd. 30°49′45″N 84°00′49″W	Thomasville	
8	Dr. David Brandon House	Dr. David Brandon House	September 4, 1970 (#70000217)	329 N. Broad St. 30°50′24″N 83°58′59″W	Thomasville	
9	Hardy Bryan House	Hardy Bryan House	August 12, 1970 (#70000218)	312 N. Broad St. 30°50′24″N 83°58′54″W	Thomasville	Also a contributing property to the Dawson Street Residential Historic District
10	Burch-Mitchell House	Burch-Mitchell House	September 4, 1970 (#70000220)	737 Remington Ave. 30°50′28″N 83°58′00″W	Thomasville	
11	Church of the Good Shepherd	Church of the Good Shepherd	February 5, 1987 (#86003581)	511-519 Oak St. 30°50′22″N 83°59′17″W	Thomasville	
12	Dawson Street Residential Historic District	Dawson Street Residential Historic District	September 7, 1984 (#84001251)	Roughly bounded by North Blvd., Madison, Jackson, and Hansell Sts. 30°50′39″N 83°58′55″W	Thomasville	
13	Dewey City Historic District	Dewey City Historic District	August 28, 2008 (#08000835)	Roughly bounded by Martin Luther King, Jr. Dr., Wolf St., Culpepper St., Burns St., and Felix St. 30°50′21″N 83°59′50″W	Thomasville	
14	East End Historic District	East End Historic District	September 7, 1984 (#84001254)	Roughly bounded by Metcalf, Loomis, Colton, and Blackshear Sts. (original); roughly bounded by Metcalf Ave., Simeon St., Grady St., and East Loomis St. (increase and decrease), Thomasville, Georgia; 30°49′59″N 83°58′11″W	Thomasville	There was a boundary increase on July 25, 2003 (refnum 03000677)
15	East Side School	East Side School	December 16, 1977 (#77000444)	120 N. Hansell St. 30°50′37″N 83°58′28″W	Thomasville	
16	Fletcherville Historic District	Fletcherville Historic District	April 18, 1985 (#85000861)	Roughly bounded by Siexas, Wright, S. College and W. Jackson St. 30°49′49″N 83°58′56″W	Thomasville	
17	Glenwood Historic District	Glenwood Historic District	October 14, 2010 (#10000826)	Roughly bounded by Clay St., Glenwood Dr., East Jackson St., and Euclid Dr. 30°50′55″N 83°58′06″W	Thomasville	
18	Gordon Avenue Apartments	Gordon Avenue Apartments	March 24, 1983 (#83000244)	424 Gordon Ave. 30°49′49″N 83°58′35″W	Thomasville	
19	Gordon Avenue Historic District	Gordon Avenue Historic District	April 18, 1985 (#85000860)	Gordon Ave. 30°49′18″N 83°58′27″W	Thomasville	
20	Greenwood Plantation	Greenwood Plantation	May 13, 1976 (#76000650)	GA 84; 30°51′15″N 84°01′16″W	Thomasville	
21	Augustine Hansell House	Augustine Hansell House	June 22, 1970 (#70000221)	429 S. Hansell St. 30°50′13″N 83°58′16″W	Thomasville	
22	Hollywood Plantation	Hollywood Plantation	November 15, 2003 (#03001138)	1701 Old Monticello Rd. 30°49′13″N 83°57′19″W	Thomasville	
23	Judge Henry William and Francesca Hopkins House	Judge Henry William and Francesca Hopkins House	May 14, 2013 (#13000272)	229 Remington Ave. 30°50′16″N 83°58′36″W	Thomasville	
24	Lapham-Patterson House	Lapham-Patterson House	August 12, 1970 (#70000868)	626 N. Dawson St. 30°50′44″N 83°58′59″W	Thomasville	A National Historic Landmark, a Georgia state historic site, and a contributing property to the Dawson Street Residential Historic District
25	MacIntyre Park and MacIntyre Park High School	MacIntyre Park and MacIntyre Park High School	April 14, 2000 (#00000371)	117 Glenwood Dr. 30°50′44″N 83°58′18″W	Thomasville	
26	Melrose and Sinkola Plantations		January 4, 1990 (#89002275)	3.75 miles SW of Thomasville on US 319; 30°47′24″N 84°03′17″W	Thomasville	
27	Metcalfe Historic District	Metcalfe Historic District	September 20, 1978 (#78001007)	Roughly bounded by Magnolia, Hancock, Louis and Williams Sts. 30°42′03″N 83°59′18″W	Metcalf	
28	Mill Creek Plantation		April 14, 1997 (#97000300)	100 Mill Creek Plantation; 30°46′03″N 83°55′36″W	Thomasville	
29	Millpond Plantation	Millpond Plantation	December 12, 1976 (#76000651)	S of Thomasville on Pine Tree Blvd. 30°48′11″N 83°58′21″W	Thomasville	
30	Paradise Park Historic District	Paradise Park Historic District	September 7, 1984 (#84001256)	Roughly bounded by Metcalf Ave., Colton, Broad, and Loomis Sts. (original), 502 S. Broad St. (increase); 30°49′56″N 83°58′25″W	Thomasville	There was a boundary increase on April 1, 2002 (refnum 02000292)
31	Park Front	Park Front	August 12, 1970 (#70000222)	711 S. Hansell St. 30°49′57″N 83°58′20″W	Thomasville	
32	Pebble Hill Plantation	Pebble Hill Plantation	February 23, 1990 (#90000146)	US 319, 4 mi. SW of Thomasville; 30°46′49″N 84°03′50″W	Thomasville	
33	Martha Poe Dogtrot House		May 20, 1998 (#98000569)	0.75 W of jct of Twelve Mile Post Rd. and GA 19; 30°41′34″N 83°50′58″W	Metcalf	
34	Ephraim Ponder House	Ephraim Ponder House	August 12, 1970 (#70000223)	324 N. Dawson St. 30°50′19″N 83°58′56″W	Thomasville	
35	Stevens Street Historic District	Stevens Street Historic District	May 10, 2001 (#01000500)	Along Stevens St., 1 blk. NW of Thomas County Courthouse; 30°50′28″N 83°59′21″W	Thomasville	
36	Thomas County Courthouse	Thomas County Courthouse	June 22, 1970 (#70000224)	N. Broad St. 30°50′20″N 83°58′55″W	Thomasville	
37	Thomasville Commercial Historic District	Thomasville Commercial Historic District	September 7, 1984 (#84001258)	Roughly N. Stevens, N. Madison, N. Broad, Remington, Jackson, and Jefferson Sts. (original), Downtown Thomasville bet. Jefferson St. and Smith Ave. and bet. Crawford And Siexas St. (increase and decrease); 30°50′12″N 83°58′53″W	Thomasville	There was a boundary increase on October 28, 2004 (refnum 04001185)
38	Thomasville Depot	Thomasville Depot	May 19, 1988 (#88000609)	420 W. Jackson St./US 319; 30°50′01″N 83°59′03″W	Thomasville	
39	Tockwotton-Love Place Historic District	Tockwotton-Love Place Historic District	September 7, 1984 (#84001260)	Roughly bounded by McLean Ave., Hansell, Jackson, and Seward Sts. 30°50′24″N 83°58′23″W	Thomasville	
40	Wright House	Wright House	August 12, 1970 (#70000225)	415 Fletcher St. 30°49′54″N 83°58′55″W	Thomasville	

== Former listings ==
	Name on the Register	Image	Date listed	Date removed	Location	City or town	Description
1	Thomasville Historic District		October 10, 1975 (#75000610)	September 7, 1984	Irregular pattern extending N to North Blvd., S to Loomis, E to Hansell, and W to Oak St.	Thomasville	This district was split into six separate districts in 1984.
