= East End (disambiguation) =

The East End of London is the historic core of wider East London.

East End or Eastend may also refer to:

== Places ==
=== Australia ===
- East End, Adelaide
- East End, Queensland
- East End Theatre District, Melbourne

=== Canada ===
- Eastend, Saskatchewan
- East End of Rundle, a mountain in Alberta

=== New Zealand ===
- East End, New Zealand

=== Norway ===
- East End and West End of Oslo

=== Sierra Leone ===
- East End of Freetown

=== United Kingdom ===
==== England ====
- East End, Buckinghamshire
- East End, Hampshire
- East End, Suffolk
- East End, Oxfordshire, in North Leigh civil parish
- Lower Don Valley, also known as the East End of Sheffield

==== Scotland ====
- East End, Glasgow

==== Overseas Territories ====
- East End, Anguilla
- East End, Cayman Islands

=== United States ===
- East End, Arkansas
- East End (Arizona), a mountain in the McDowell Mountains
- East End (Waterbury), Connecticut
- East End (Long Island), Suffolk County, New York
- East End, Cincinnati, Ohio
- East End (Pittsburgh), Pennsylvania
- East End, Portland, Maine
- East End, Houston, Texas
- East End, Virginia, in Westmoreland County
- East End (Newport News, Virginia)
- East End (Richmond, Virginia)
- East End, Saint Croix, U.S. Virgin Islands
- East End, Saint John, U.S. Virgin Islands
- East End, Saint Thomas, U.S. Virgin Islands

== Other uses ==
- The east end of a cathedral

== See also ==
- East Side (disambiguation)
- East End Bridge (disambiguation)
- East End Historic District (disambiguation)
- East End Park (disambiguation)
- EastEnders, British soap opera set in the East End of London
