= East Side School =

East Side School may refer to:

- East Side School (Thomasville, Georgia), listed on the National Register of Historic Places in Thomas County, Georgia
- East Side School (Oswego, Kansas), listed on the National Register of Historic Places in Labette County, Kansas
- East Side School (Laramie, Wyoming), listed on the National Register of Historic Places in Albany County, Wyoming
