= East End Historic District =

East End Historic District may refer to:

- East End Historic District (Thomasville, Georgia), listed on the NRHP in Georgia
- East End Historic District (Valdosta, Georgia), listed on the NRHP in Georgia
- East End Historic District (Quincy, Illinois), listed on the NRHP in Illinois
- East End Historic District (Ipswich, Massachusetts), listed on the NRHP in Massachusetts
- East End Historic District (Meridian, Mississippi), listed on the NRHP in Mississippi
- East End Historic District (Newburgh, New York), listed on the NRHP in New York
- East End Historic District (Ahoskie, North Carolina), listed on the NRHP in North Carolina
- East End Historic District (Lebanon, Ohio), listed on the NRHP in Ohio
- East End Historic District (Galveston, Texas), listed on the NRHP in Texas
- East End Historic District (Charleston, West Virginia), listed on the NRHP in West Virginia
- East End Historic District (Middleton, Wisconsin), listed on the NRHP in Wisconsin
