= Boston Historic District =

Historic district in Georgia, United States

- U.S. National Register of Historic Places
- U.S. Historic district
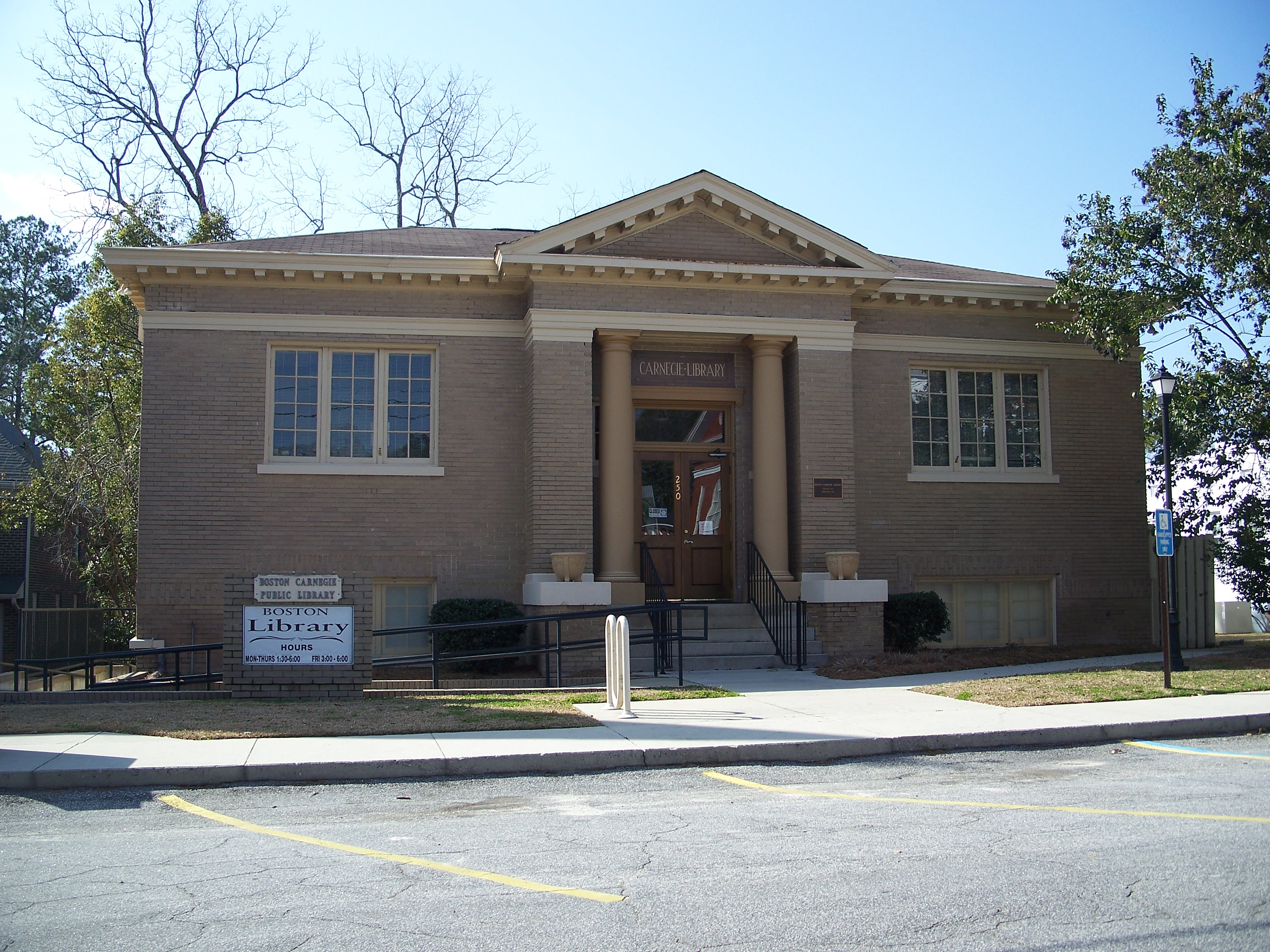
- Carnegie library

- Location within Georgia Location within the United States
- Location: Roughly bounded by US 84, Roundtree and S. Oak Sts, Washington St. and W. Jefferson and W. Railroad Sts., Boston, Georgia
- Coordinates: 30.791944°N 83.79°W
- Area: 355 acres (144 ha)
- Built: 1860
- Architectural style: Queen Anne, Classical Revival, et al.
- NRHP reference No.: 07000375
- Added to NRHP: May 1, 2007

The Boston Historic District in Boston in Thomas County, Georgia is a historic district which was listed on the National Register of Historic Places in 2007. The district then included 192 contributing buildings, five contributing structures, and two contributing sites, as well as 140 non-contributing buildings.

One contributing building is the Boston Methodist Church, built after a fire destroyed its predecessor in 1876, modified in 1909, repaired after a 1945 fire.

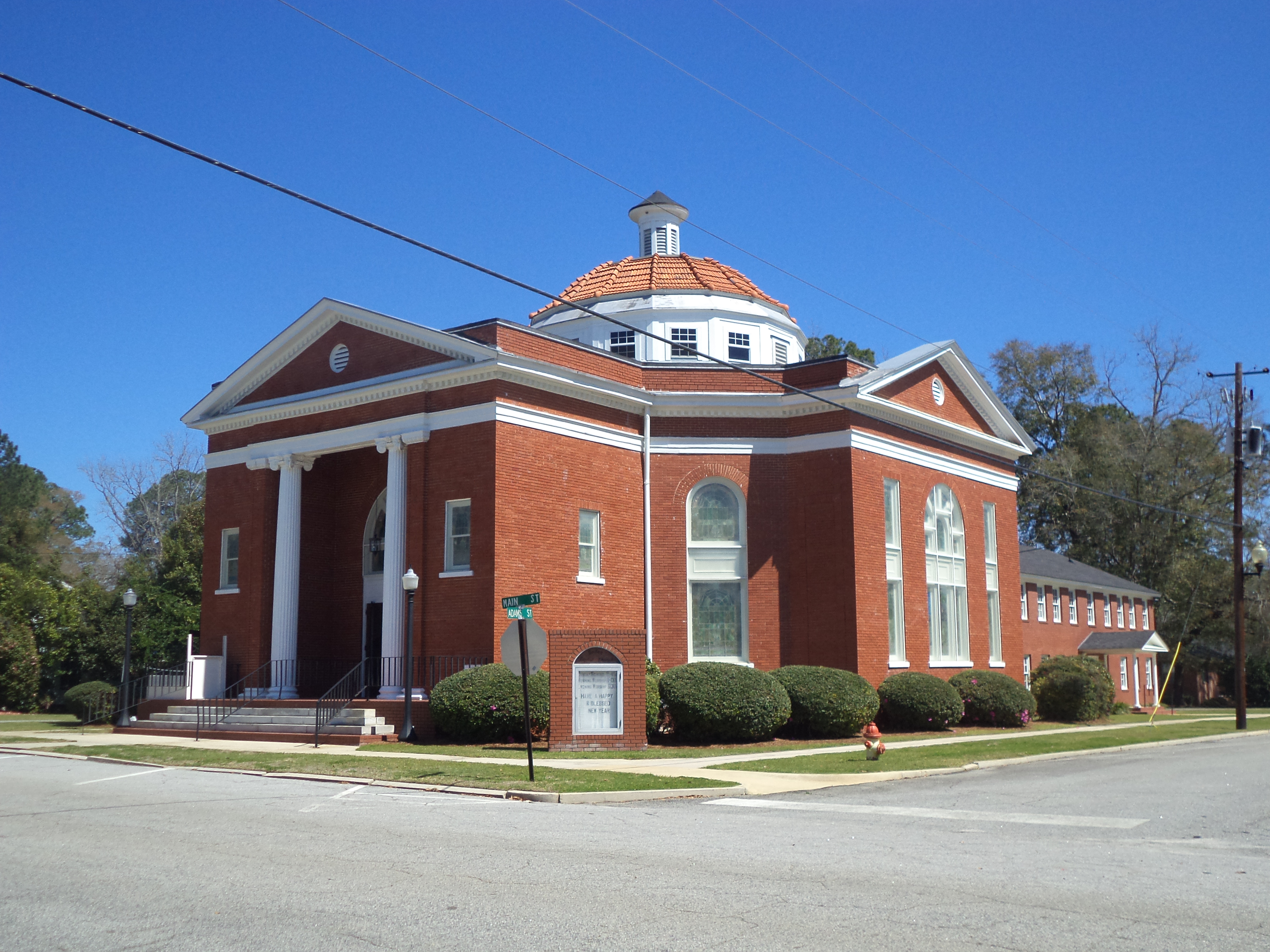
Boston Baptist Church

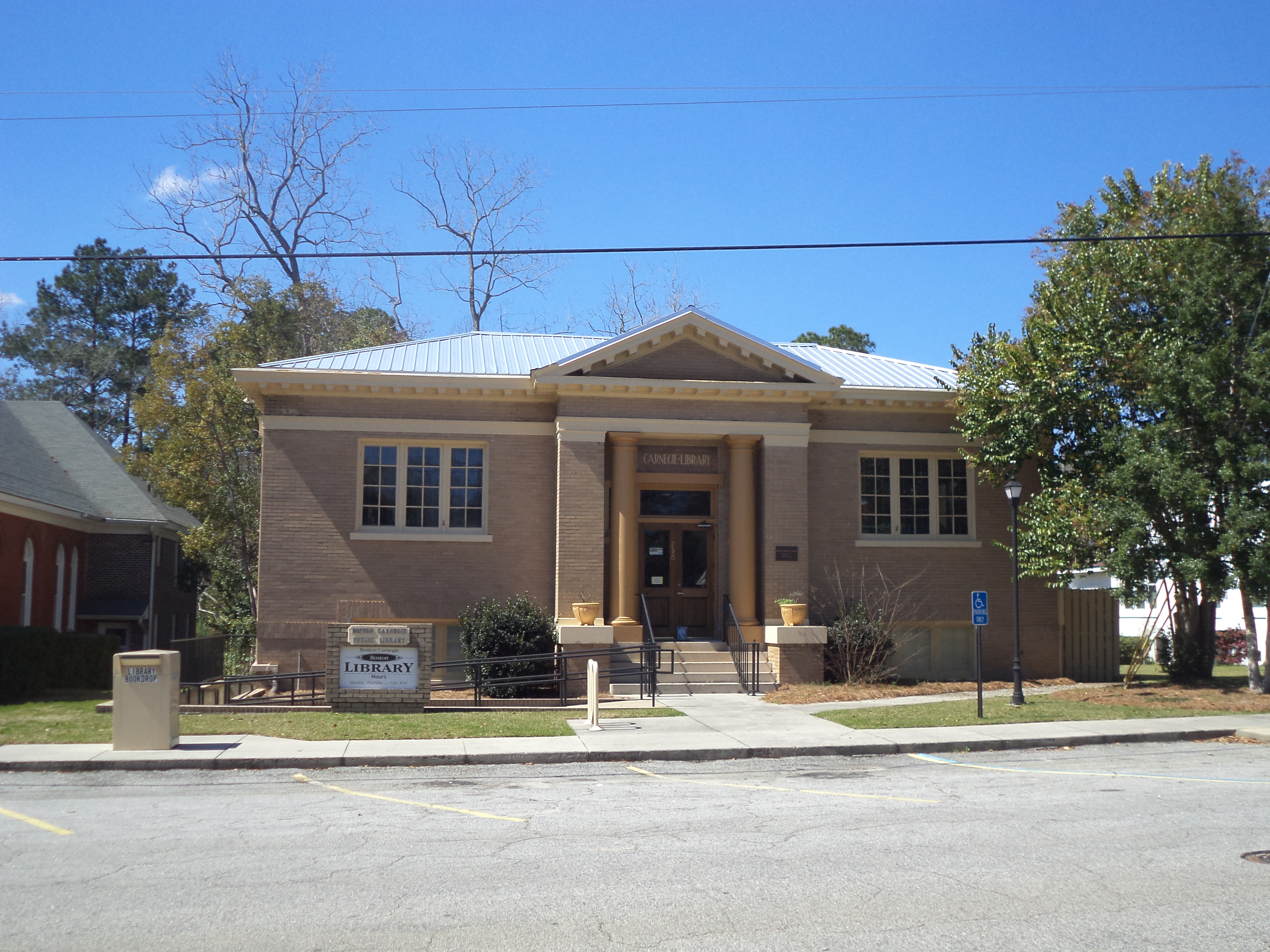
Boston Carnegie Library

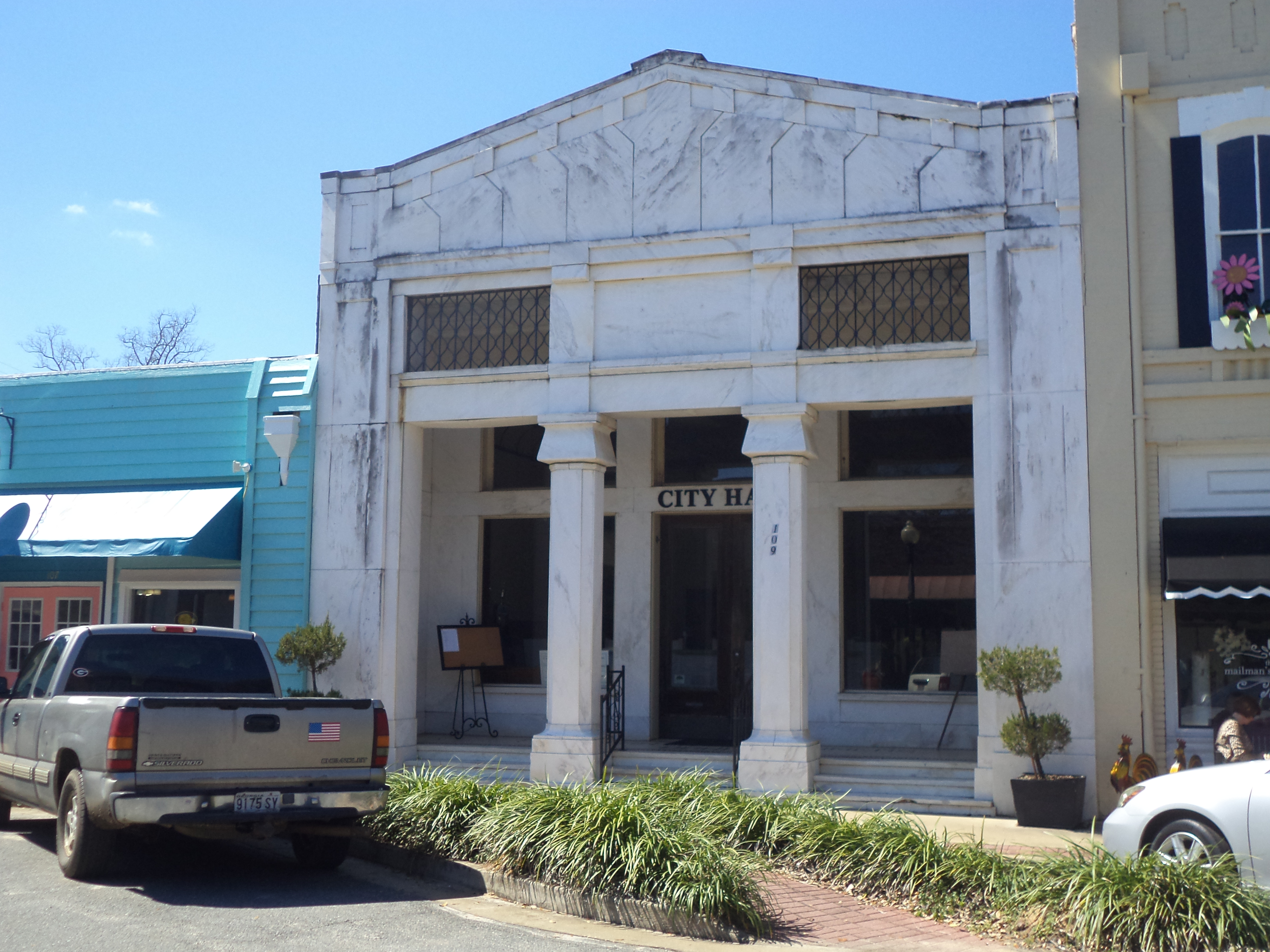
Boston City Hall

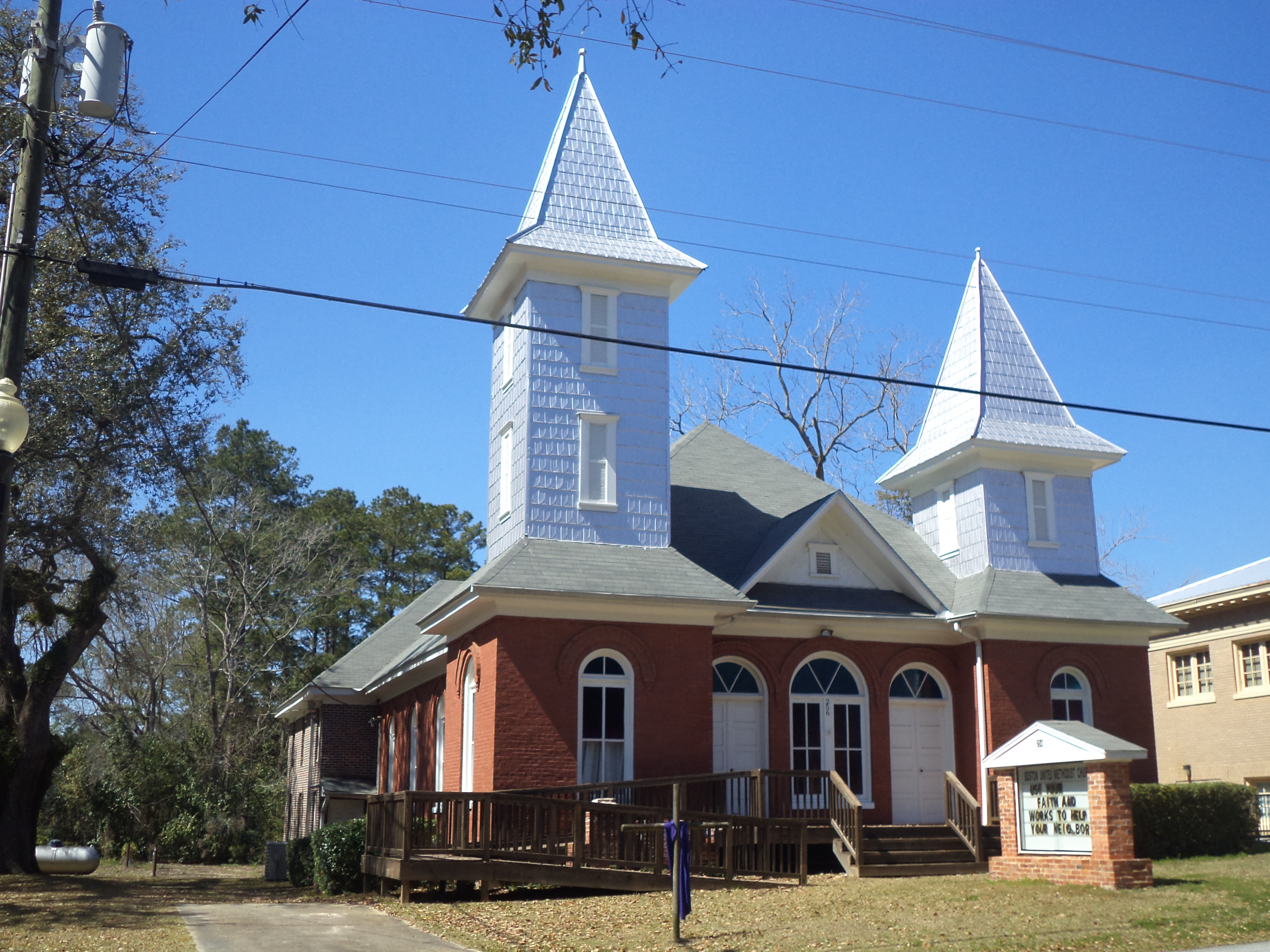
Boston Methodist Church

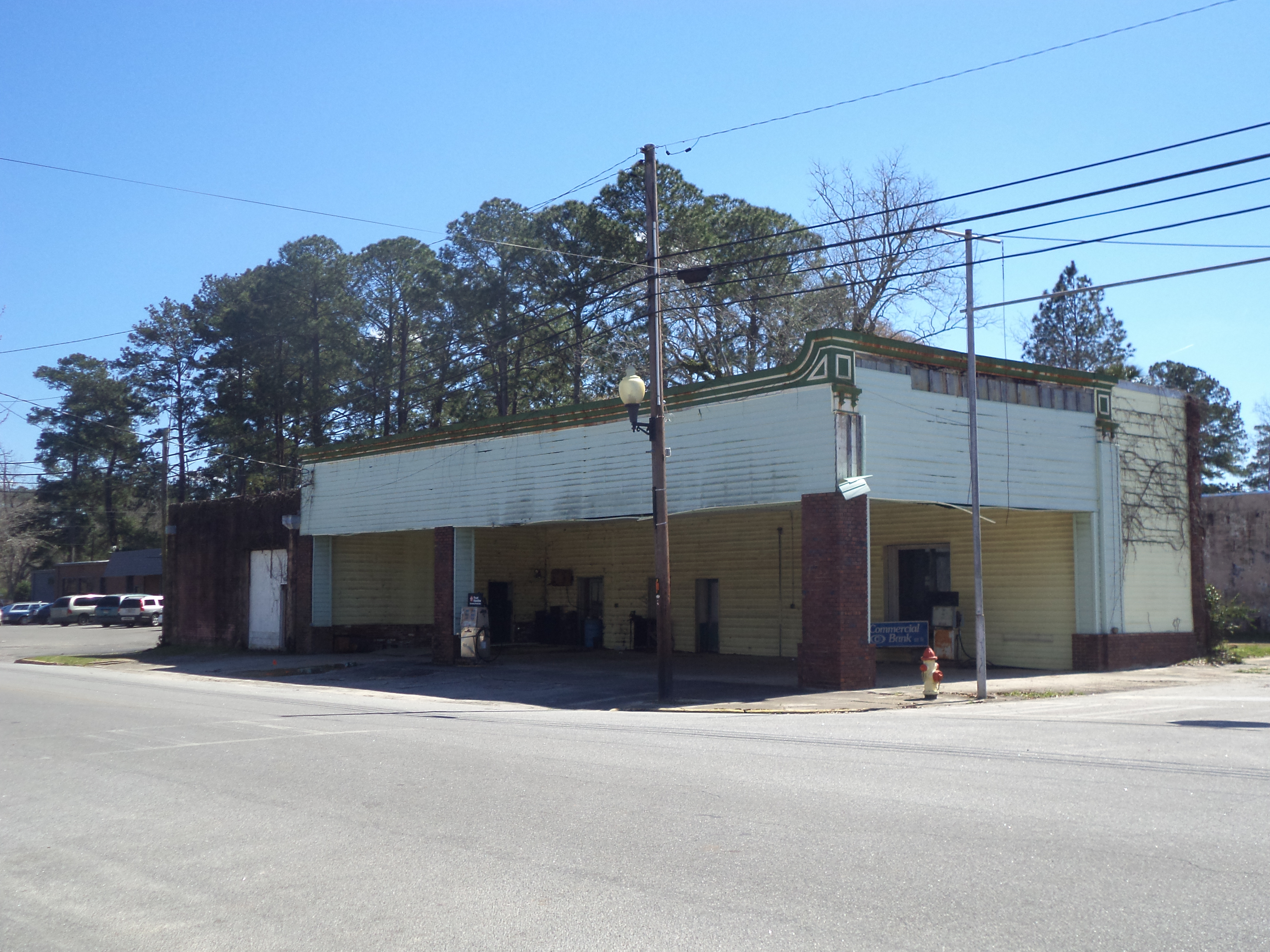
Historic Gas Station

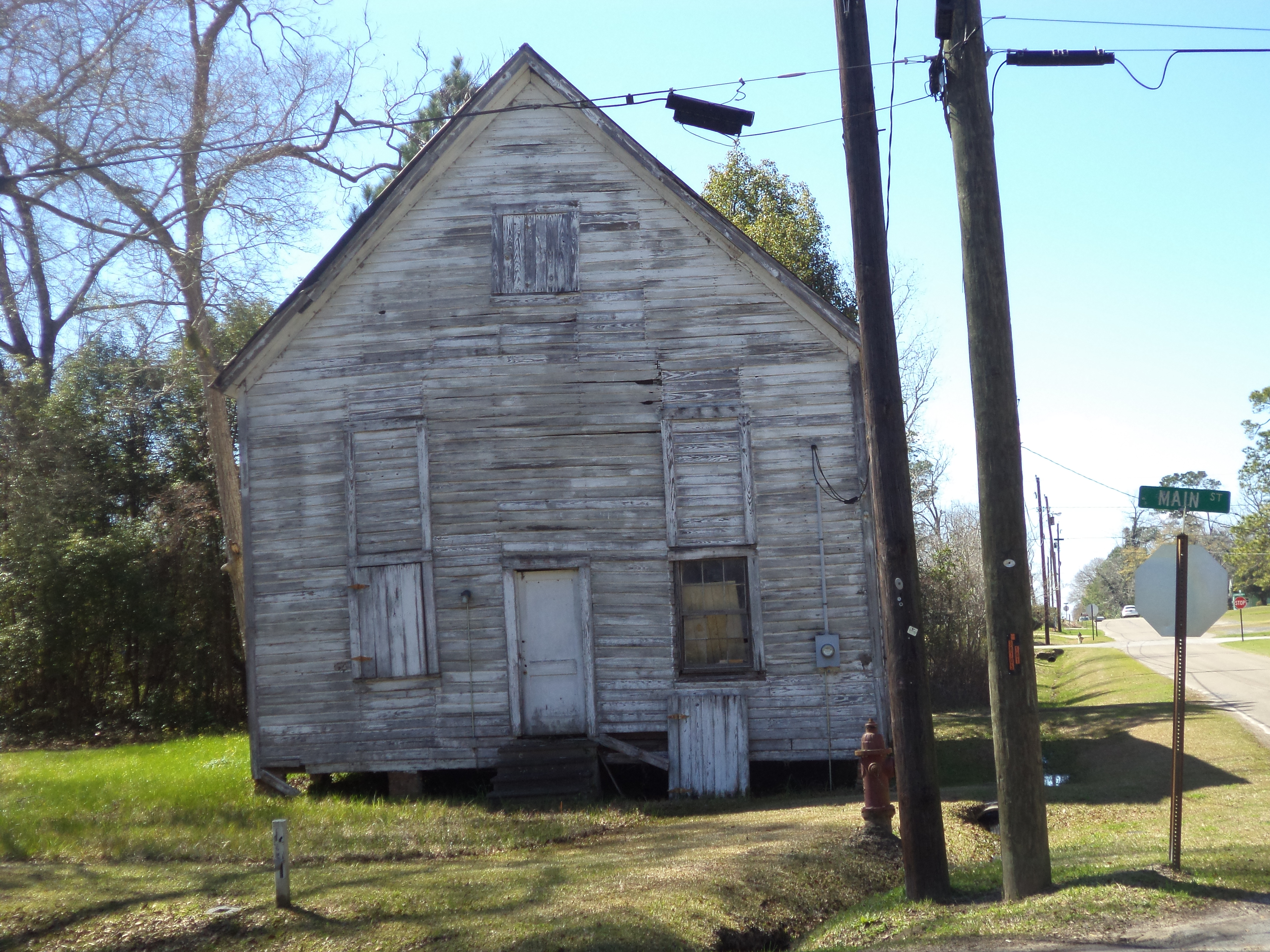
Mt. Vernon Lodge
