= Judge Henry William and Francesca Hopkins House =

Historic house in Georgia, United States

- U.S. National Register of Historic Places
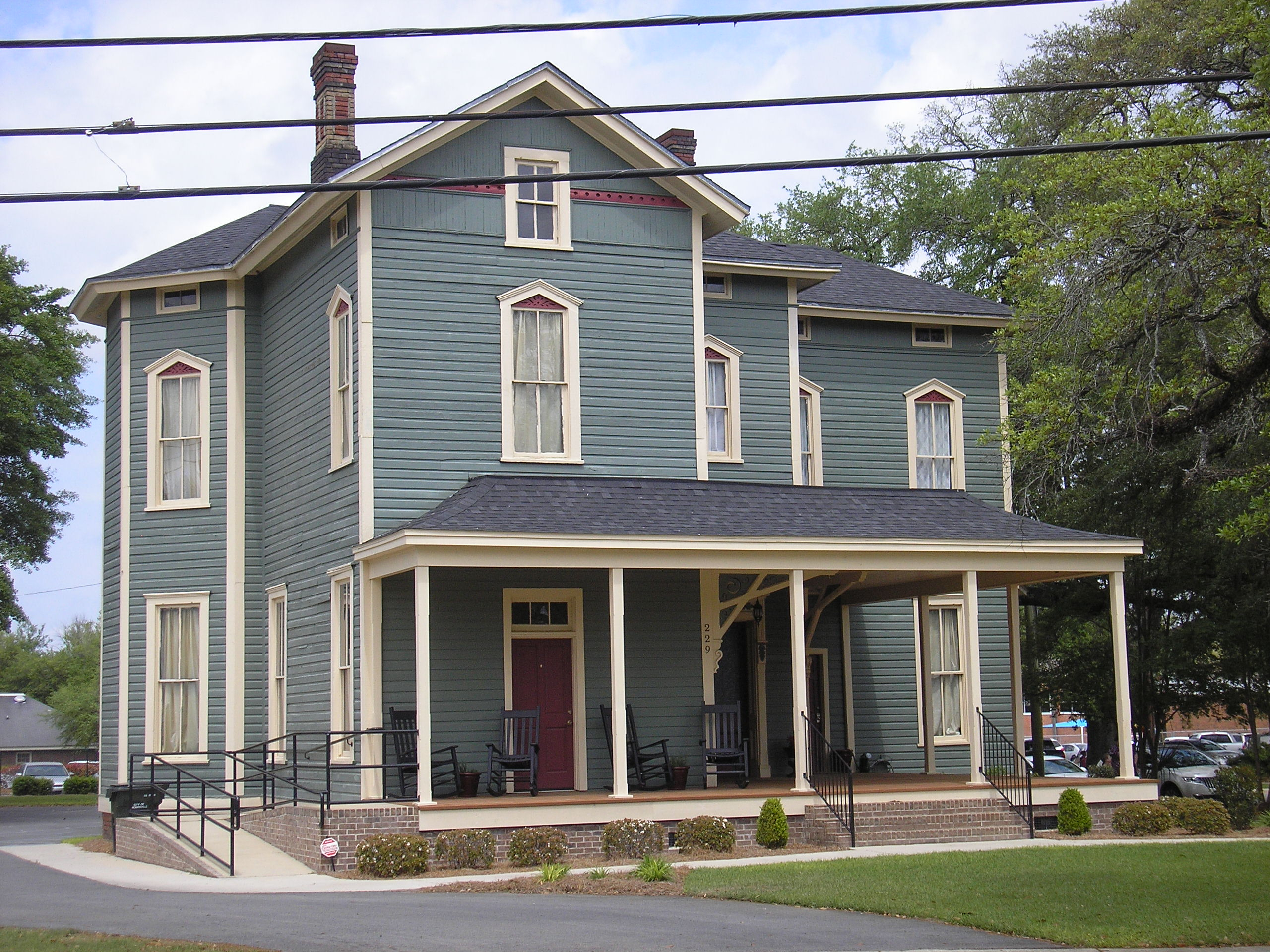

- Location within Georgia Location within the United States
- Location: 229 Remington Ave., Thomasville, Georgia
- Coordinates: 30.837854°N 83.976595°W
- Built: 1886
- Built by: Tudor Rommerdall
- Architectural style: Italian Villa
- NRHP reference No.: 13000272
- Added to NRHP: May 14, 2013

The Judge Henry William and Francesca Hopkins House in Thomasville, Georgia is located two blocks east of Broad Street, the main commercial street in Thomasville. The house was listed on the National Register of Historic Places in 2013.

It was home of Henry William Hopkins (1850-1945) and his wife Francesca (Fannie) Carara Seward (1852-1923).

== History ==
Built in 1886 by master-builder Tudor Rommerdall, the Hopkins house is a picturesque two-story, wood-frame house designed in the Italian Villa style. The L-shaped main block features a tower in the re-entrant angle that originally included a cupola, or belvedere, which was removed by 1928.

The house is clad in weatherboard and covered with a low-pitched roof with corbeled chimneys. The double-leaf main entrance is sheltered by a wraparound porch.

The initial "H" for Hopkins is centered above the entrance among foliated carvings. The house also features a two-story octagonal tower and a one-story, triangular-shaped window bay. The house is rich in architectural detail and scroll-sawn details are located on the exterior.

== Interior ==
The interior plan features a central hall with two large parlors on the southwest side and the dining room and rear stairwell to the northeast. The interior features an elaborate main stair and ornate mantels and moldings. The second floor features five bedrooms and a bathroom.

== Restoration ==
Beginning in 1956, the house was divided into four apartments and many rooms were divided into smaller ones. In 2011, the Hopkins house was rehabilitated as office space, which resulted in the removal of many of the non-historic partition walls and the preservation of many historic features.

Several houses further out Remington Avenue are also listed on the National Register, in the Tockwotton-Love Place Historic District.
