= East End Bridge =

East End Bridge may refer to:

- East Huntington Bridge, also called East End Bridge, in Huntington, West Virginia, U.S.
- Lewis and Clark Bridge (Ohio River), also called East End Bridge, in Louisville, Kentucky, U.S.

== See also ==
- East End (disambiguation)
