= MacIntyre Park and MacIntyre Park High School =

- U.S. National Register of Historic Places
- U.S. Historic district
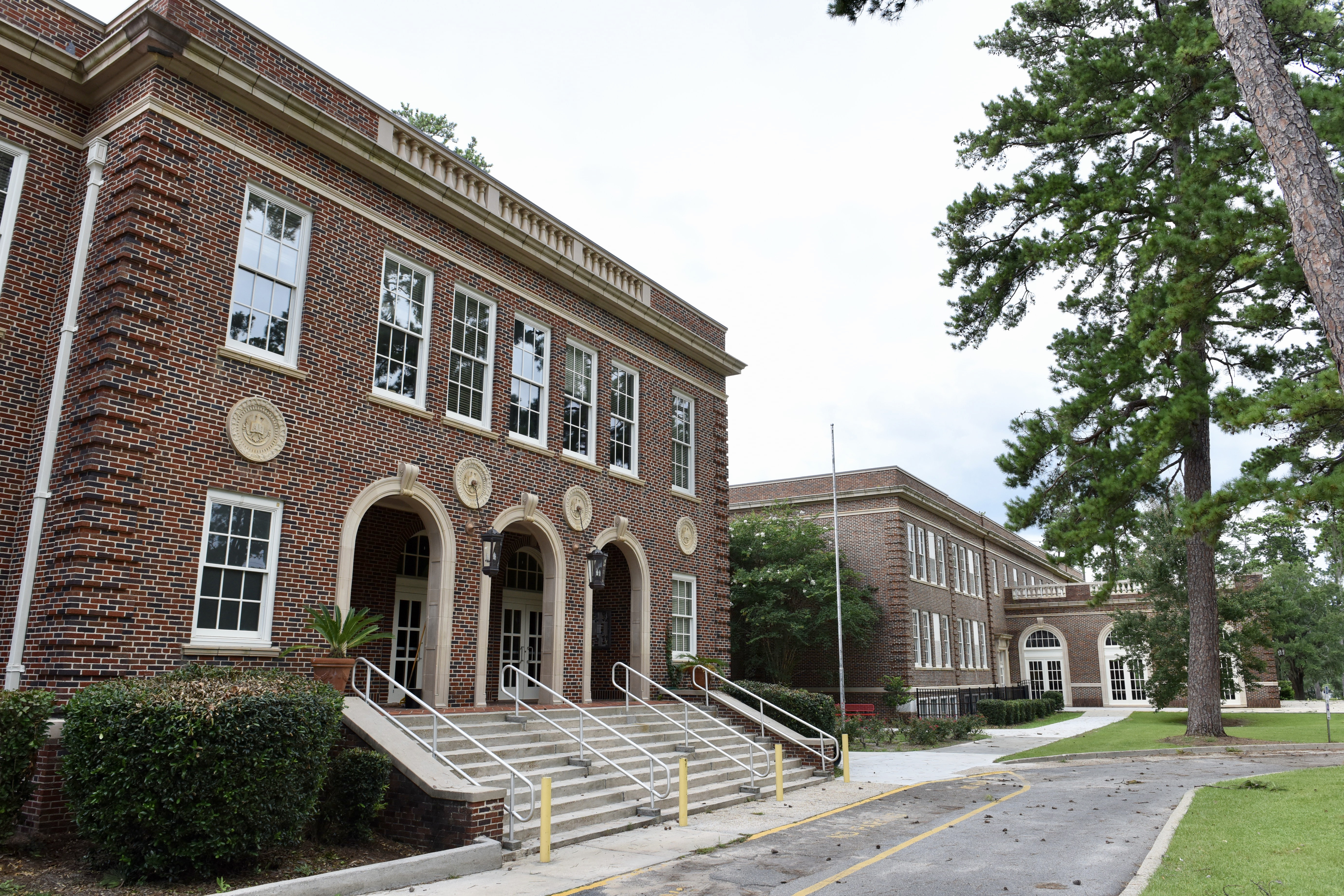

- Location within Georgia Location within the United States
- Location: 117 Glenwood Dr., Thomasville, Georgia
- Coordinates: 30.84542°N 83.97117°W
- Area: 25.6 acres (10.4 ha)
- Built: 1893, 1925-26, 1930
- Architect: A. Ten Eyke Brown; Lockwood & Poundstone
- Architectural style: Classical Revival
- NRHP reference No.: 00000371
- Added to NRHP: April 14, 2000

MacIntyre Park and MacIntyre Park High School is a historic district in Thomasville, Georgia which was listed on the National Register of Historic Places in 2000. It included four contributing buildings, one contributing structure and two contributing sites.

It consists of a 25.6 acres (10.4 ha) property including the MacIntyre Park High School and a 10 acres (4.0 ha) MacIntyre Park.

The high school's original building, built during 1925–26, is Classical Revival in style and was designed by architect A. Ten Eyke Brown or A. Ten Eyck Brown Its south building, built in 1930, was designed by Lockwood & Poundstone. It is now a middle school.
