= Tockwotton-Love Place Historic District =

Historic district in Georgia, United States

- U.S. National Register of Historic Places
- U.S. Historic district
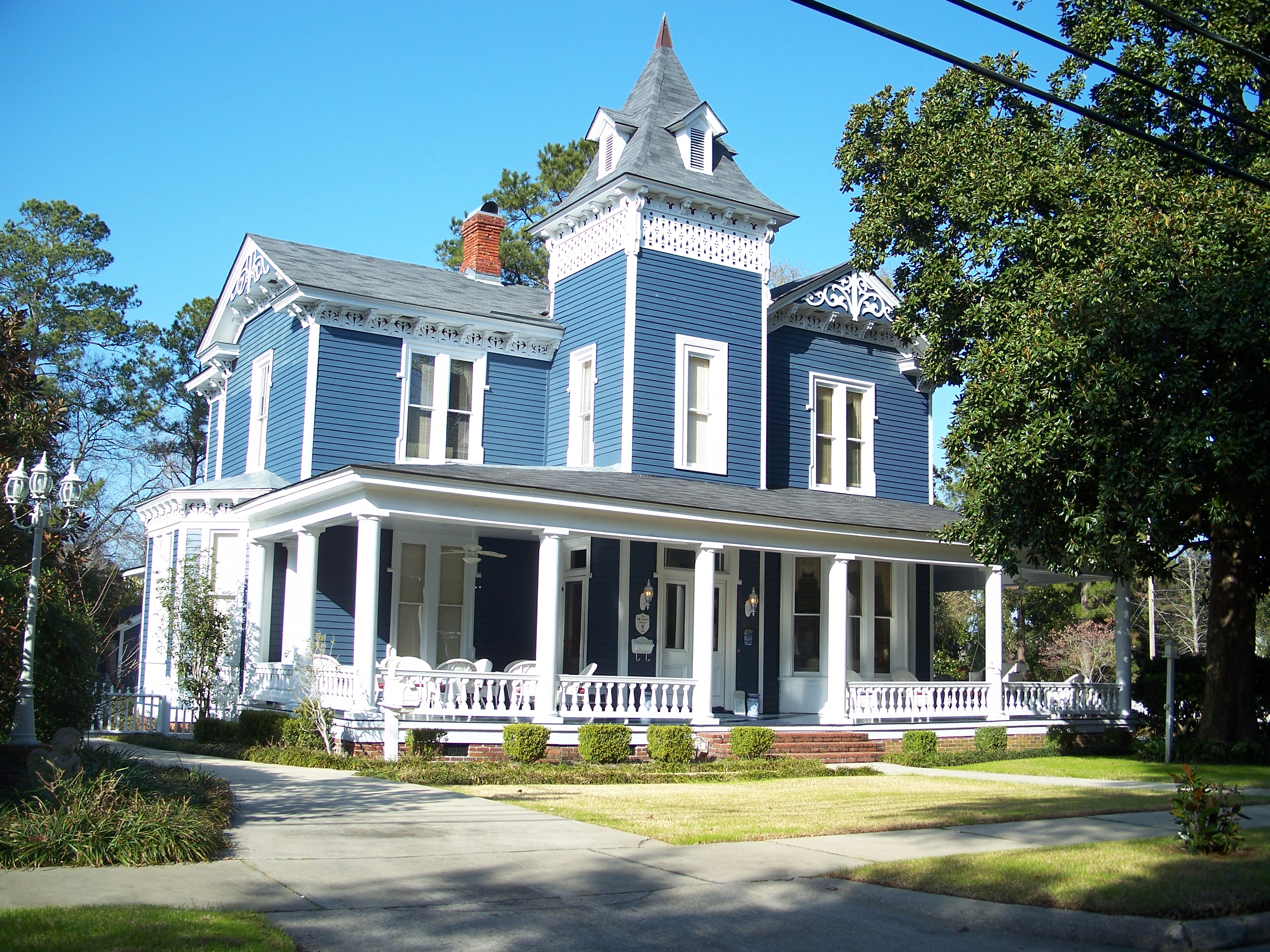
- 445 Remington Ave.

- Location within Georgia Location within the United States
- Location: Roughly bounded by McLean Ave., Hansell, Jackson, and Seward Sts., Thomasville, Georgia
- Coordinates: 30.84°N 83.973056°W
- Area: 45 acres (18 ha)
- Architect: Multiple
- Architectural style: Late 19th And 20th Century Revivals, Late Victorian
- NRHP reference No.: 84001260
- Added to NRHP: September 7, 1984

The Tockwotton-Love Place Historic District in Thomasville, Georgia is a historic district which was listed on the National Register of Historic Places in 1984.

The district then included 80 contributing buildings with relatively few intrusions or non-historic buildings. It includes two residential neighborhoods bisected by Remington Avenue: Love Place to the north and Tockwotton to the south.

Among its historic properties are:

- 331 Remington St. is striking with a two-story portico having a second floor porch, intersected by a first-floor full-length porch (see #11 in accompanying photos).
- "The Paxton", a historic house hotel, at 445 Remington Avenue, at the corner of South Hansell St.
- The antebellum Augustine Hansell House, at 429 South Hansell Street, is separately listed on the National Register.
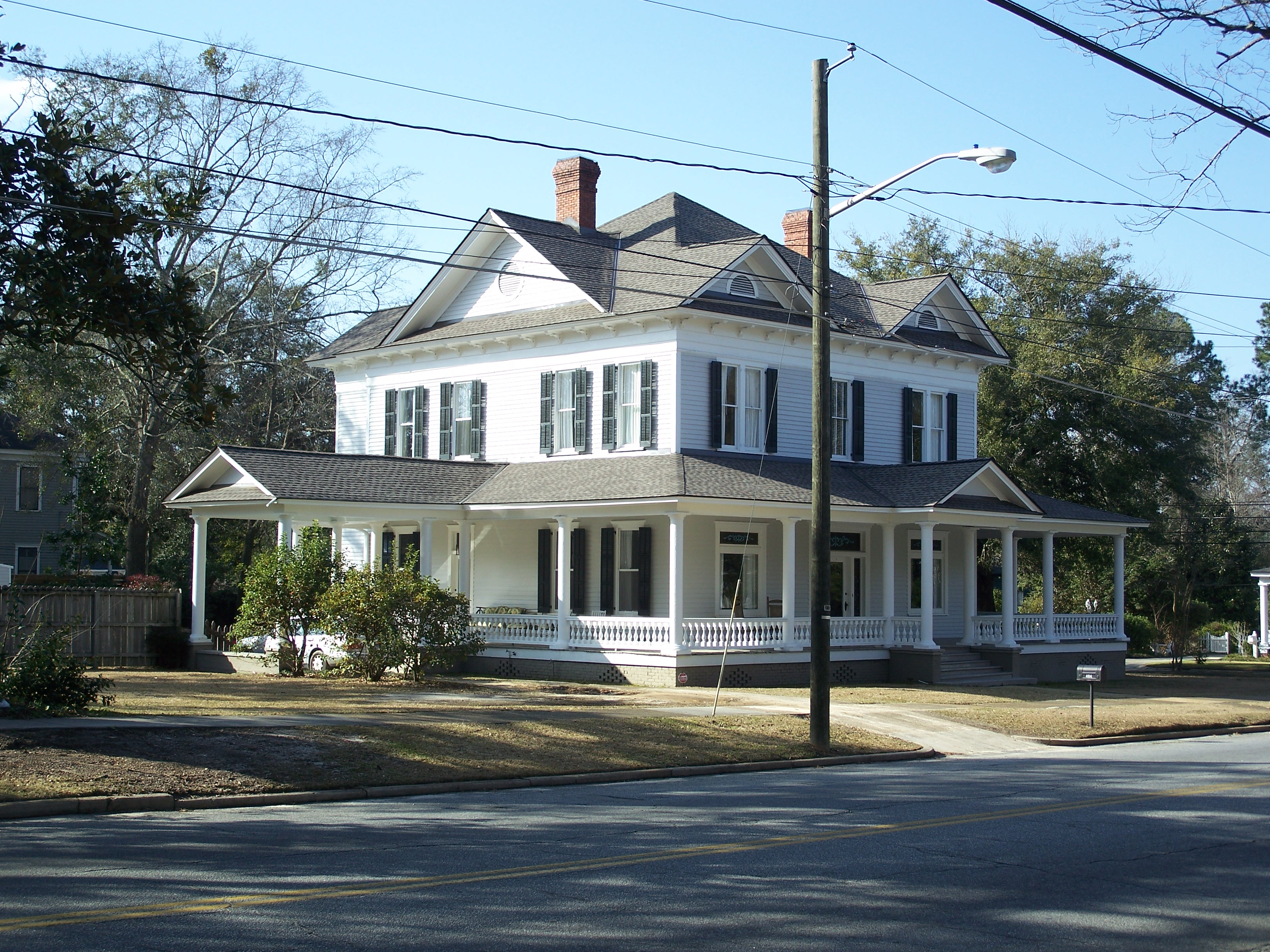
404 South Hansell St.

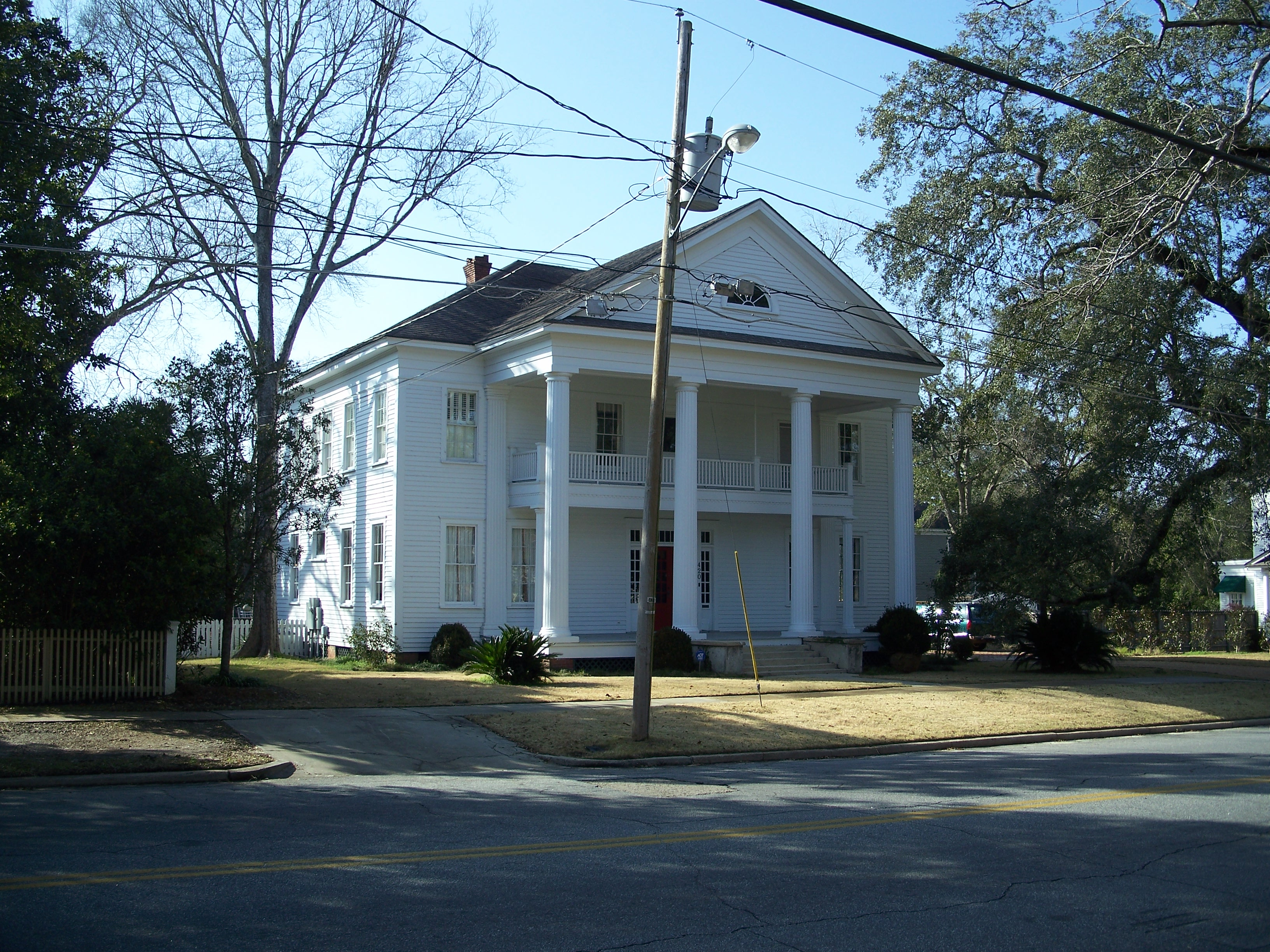
420 South Hansell St.

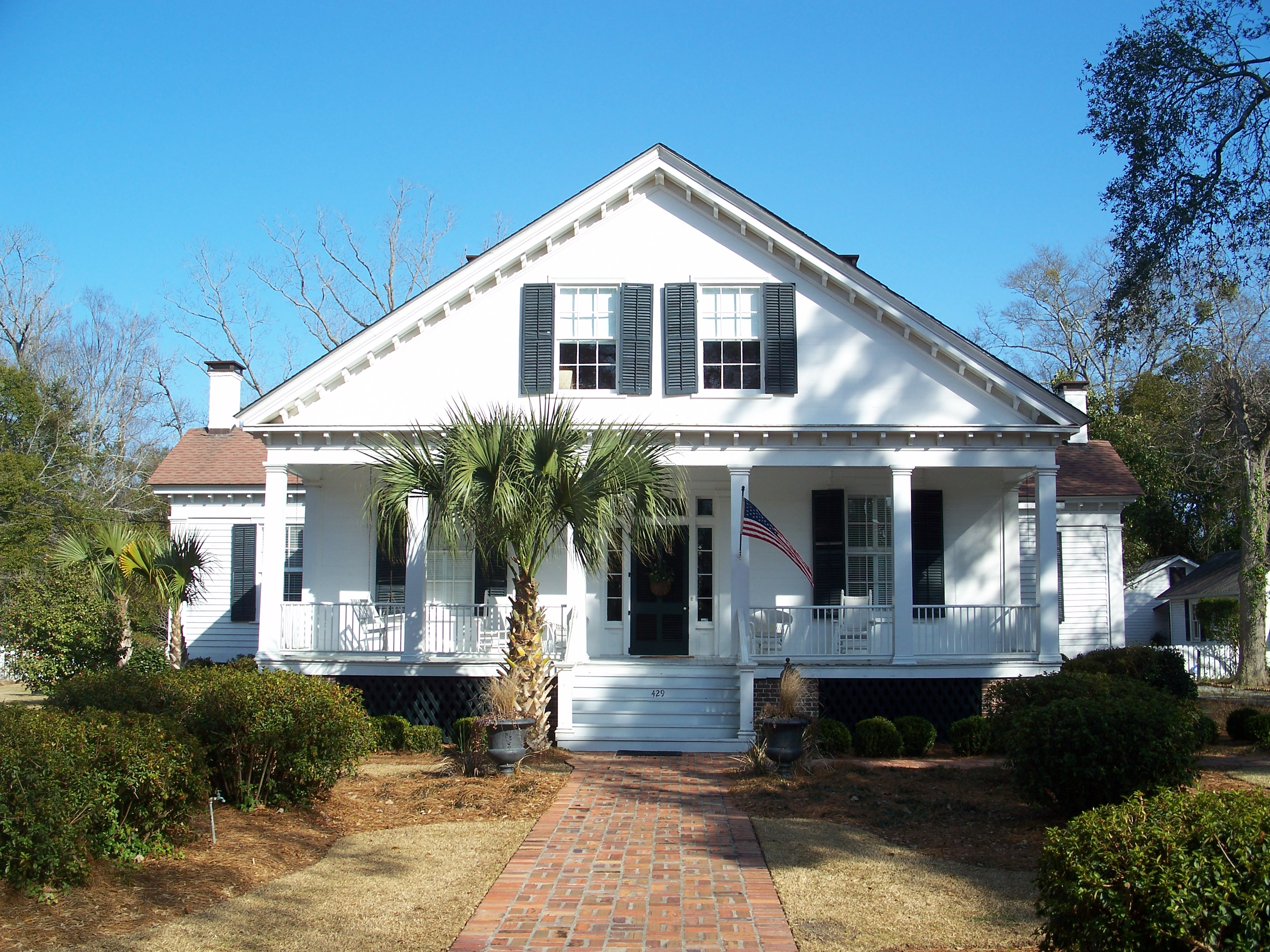
Augustine Hansell House, 429 South Hansell

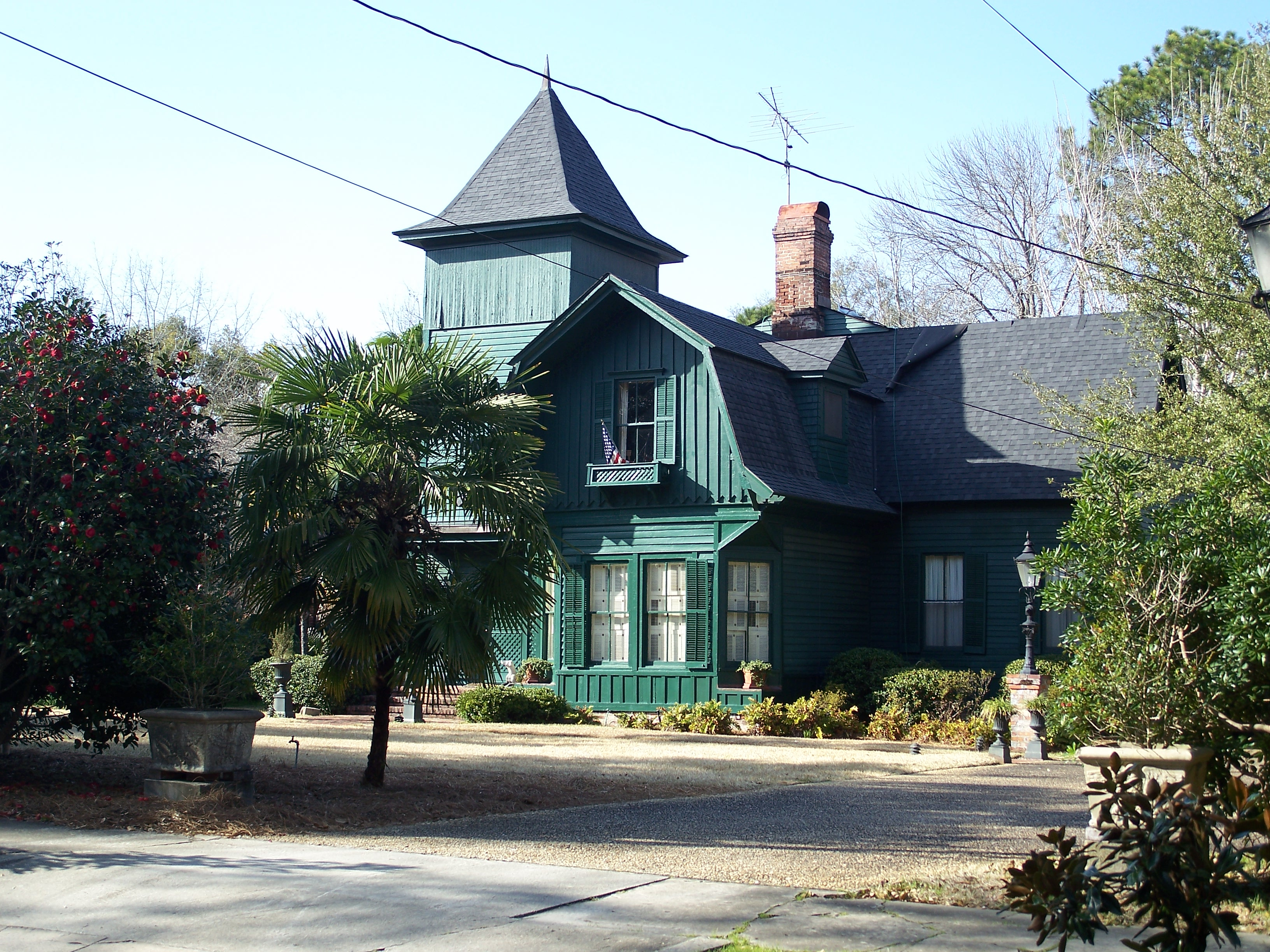
437 Remington Ave.
