= Wright House (Thomasville, Georgia) =

Historic house in Georgia, United States

- U.S. National Register of Historic Places
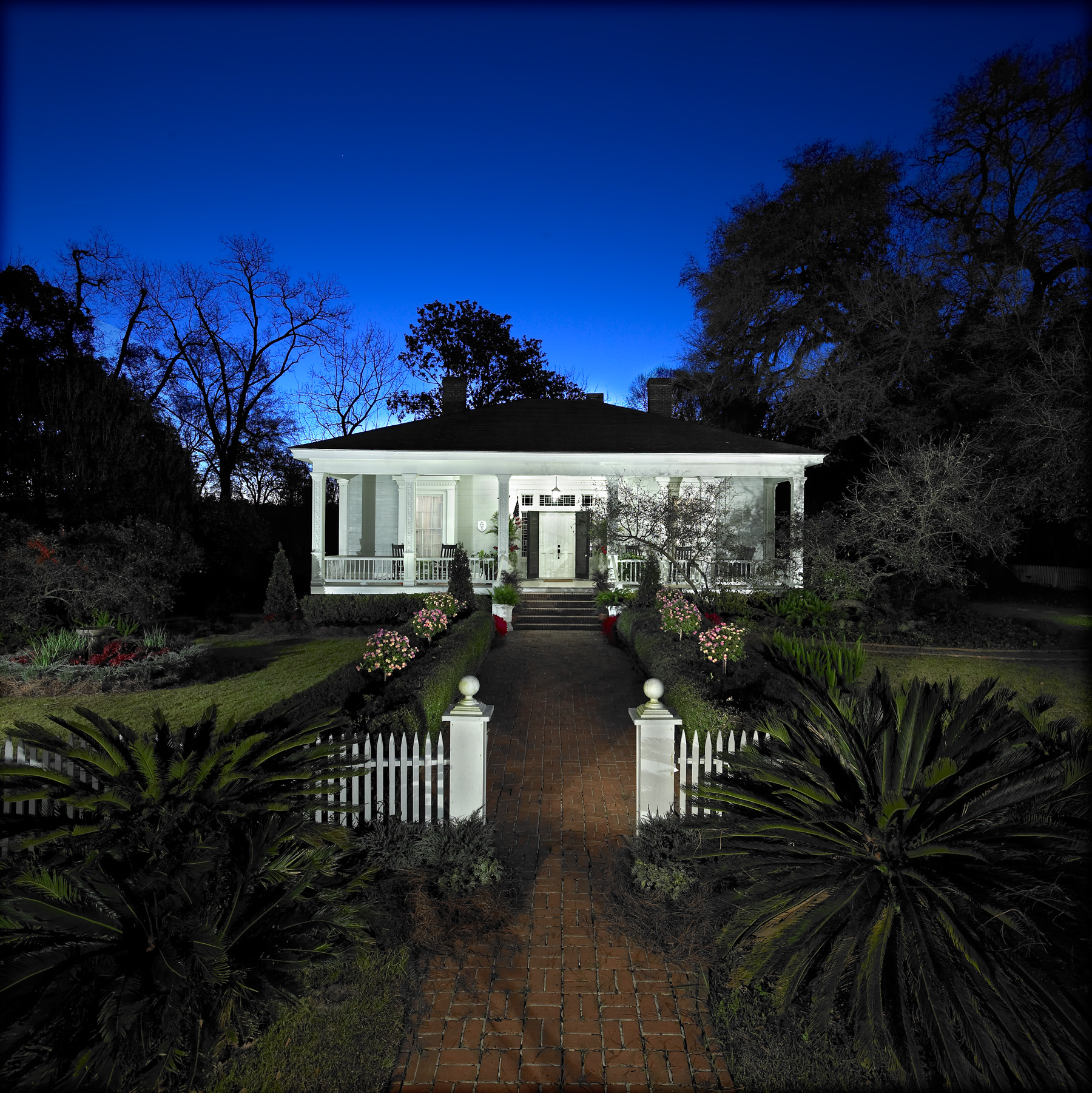

- Location within Georgia Location within the United States
- Location: 415 Fletcher St., Thomasville, Georgia
- Coordinates: 30.83168°N 83.98192°W
- Area: 1.3 acres (0.53 ha)
- Built: 1854
- Architectural style: Greek Revival, Ante-bellum cottage
- NRHP reference No.: 70000225
- Added to NRHP: August 12, 1970

The Wright House is a historic house located at 415 Fletcher St. in Thomasville, Georgia.

== Description and history ==
It is a one-story hipped roof cottage that was built in 1854. Elements of its Greek Revival style include its front doorway with sidelights and transom, and the symmetry of its front facade. It has a front entry porch with six square-panelled columns, with the panels carved decoratively. Additions have been made to the rear but these do not detract from the historic front facade.

It was listed in the National Register of Historic Places on August 12, 1970. It is also included in the Fletcherville Historic District.
