= Dewey City Historic District =

Historic district in Georgia, United States

- U.S. National Register of Historic Places
- U.S. Historic district
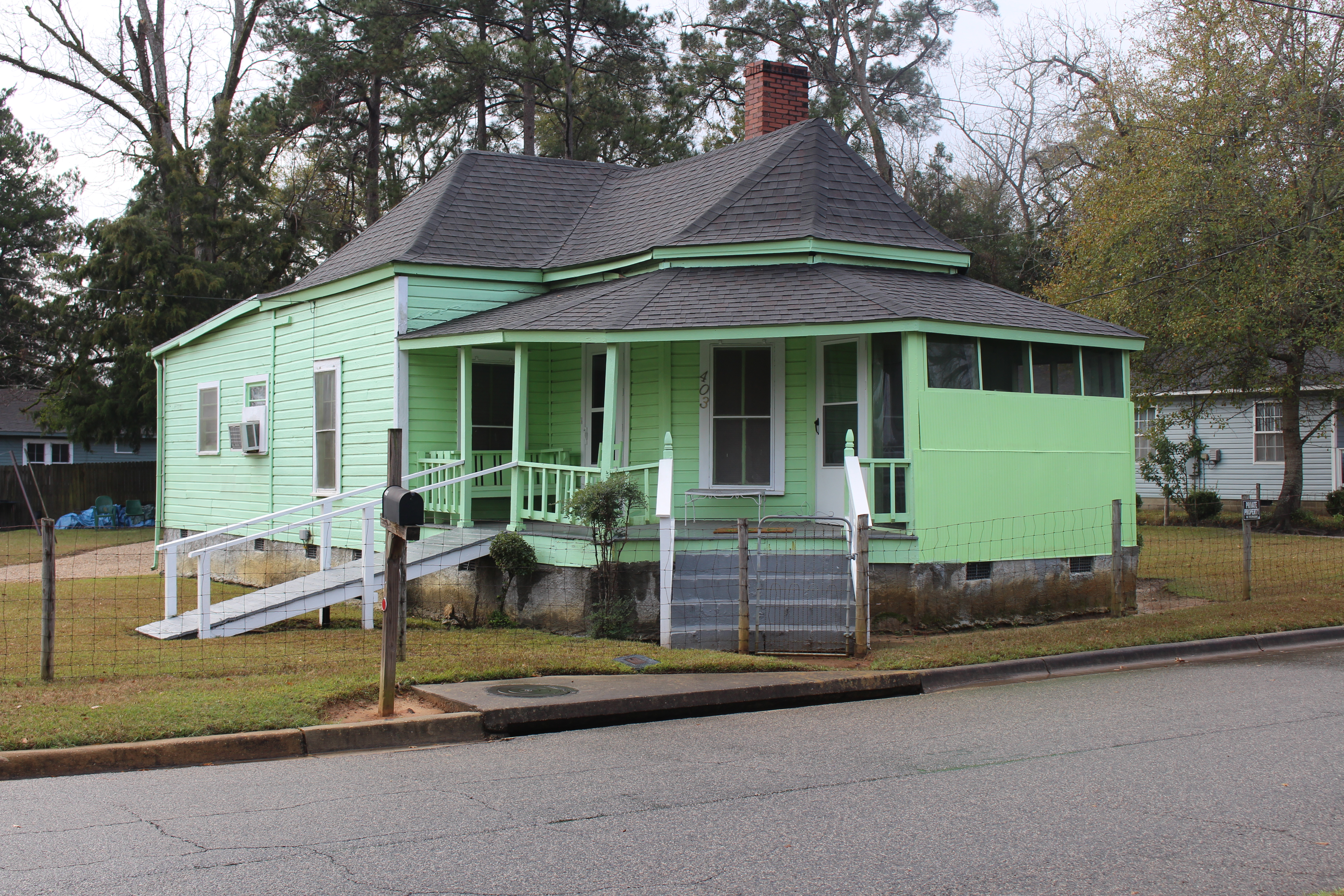

- Location within Georgia Location within the United States
- Location: Roughly bounded by Martin Luther King, Jr. Dr., Wolf St., Culpepper St., Burns St., and Felix St., Thomasville, Georgia
- Coordinates: 30.839167°N 83.997222°W
- Area: 110 acres (45 ha)
- Built: 1899
- Architectural style: Bungalow/craftsman, International Style, gabled wing cottage
- NRHP reference No.: 08000835
- Added to NRHP: August 28, 2008

The Dewey City Historic District is a 110 acres (45 ha) historic district in Thomasville, Georgia which was listed on the National Register of Historic Places in 2008. It is an intact historically African-American neighborhood.

It then included 110 contributing buildings, a structure, and a contributing site. It also included 100 non-contributing buildings and 35 non-contributing sites, and a non-contributing object.
