= Fletcherville Historic District =

Historic district in Georgia, United States

- U.S. National Register of Historic Places
- U.S. Historic district
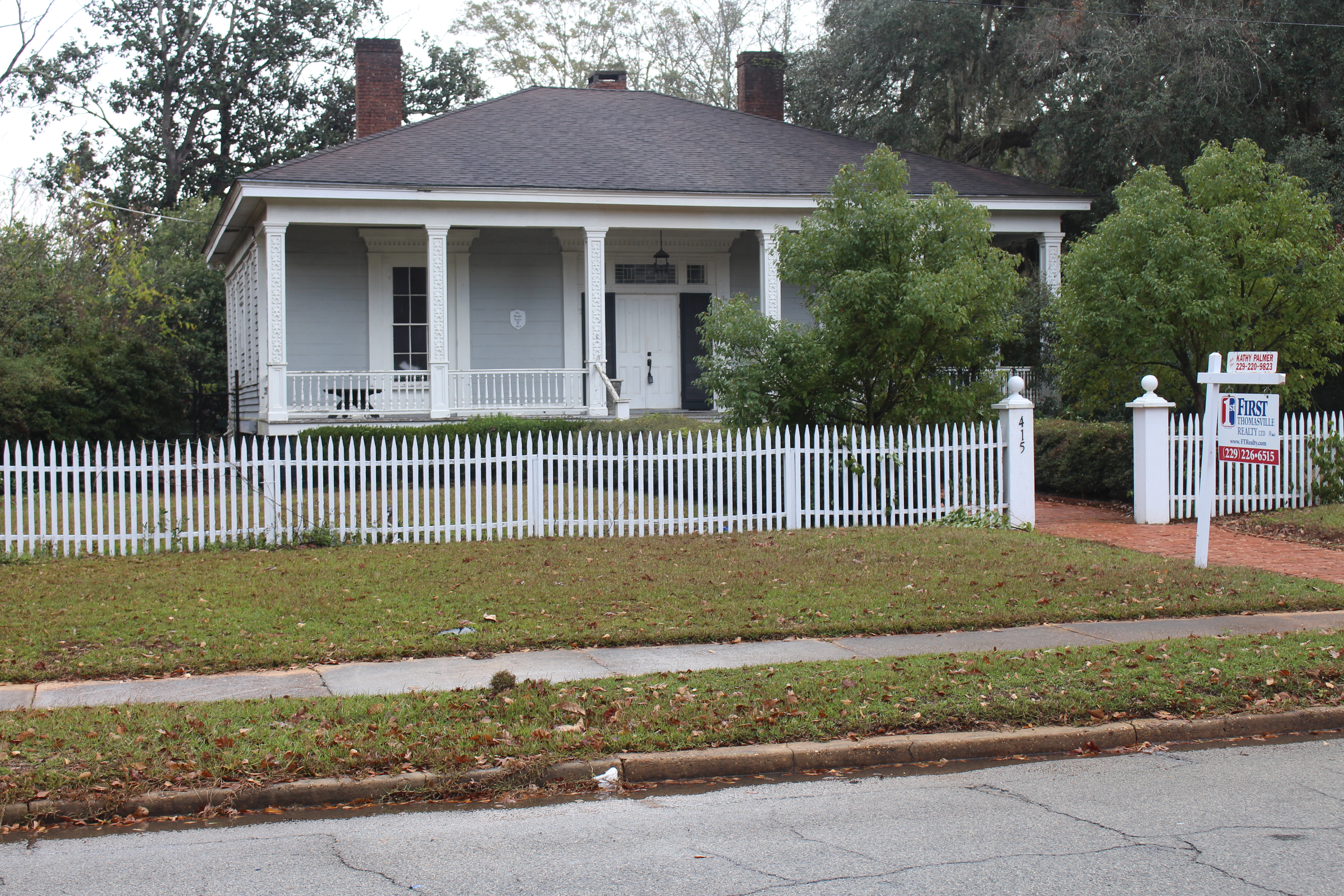
- The Arthur P. Wright house

- Location within Georgia Location within the United States
- Location: Roughly bounded by Siexas, Wright, S. College and W. Jackson St., Thomasville, Georgia
- Coordinates: 30.830278°N 83.982222°W
- Area: 38 acres (15 ha)
- Architect: Multiple
- Architectural style: Bungalow/Craftsman, Greek Revival, Victorian Eclectic
- NRHP reference No.: 85000861
- Added to NRHP: April 18, 1985

The Fletcherville Historic District is a 38 acres (15 ha) historic district which is roughly bounded by Siexas, Wright, S. College and W. Jackson St. in Thomasville, Georgia. It was listed on the National Register of Historic Places in 1985.

The oldest houses in the district are along South College Street and Fletcher Street facing what was formerly a square at the center of Fletcherville. The square originally was the site of the Fletcher Institute and is now the location of Harper School, and with its open area it remains "a significant landscape feature of the district."

The district includes the Arthur P. Wright House at 415 Fletcher Avenue, in the next block up from the square, which is separately listed on the National Register.

Predominant architecture is Bungalow/Craftsman, Greek Revival, and Victorian Eclectic. Most of the buildings in the district are modest one-story wood-frame houses. Examples of two-story houses are at 427 Fletcher, 126 College, 519 West Jackson, and 116 Siexas. Many houses have a front porch or portico with bracketed posts or Doric or Ionic columns. Some have dormer windows or Palladian windows.

The district also includes some non-contributing buildings including two modern church complexes, the Harper School, and several non-historic houses.
