= East End Park (disambiguation) =

East End Park is a football stadium in Dunfermline, Scotland, used by Dunfermline Athletic FC.

East End Park may also refer to:

- East End Park (Cincinnati), a 19th-century Major League Baseball stadium
- East End Park, Leeds, a district of Leeds, England.
