= East End, Virginia =

East End
- Coordinates: 38°05′37″N 76°48′04″W
- Country: United States
- State: Virginia
- County: Westmoreland

East End is an unincorporated community in Westmoreland County, in the U. S. state of Virginia.
