= Park Front =

Historic house in Georgia, United States

- U.S. National Register of Historic Places
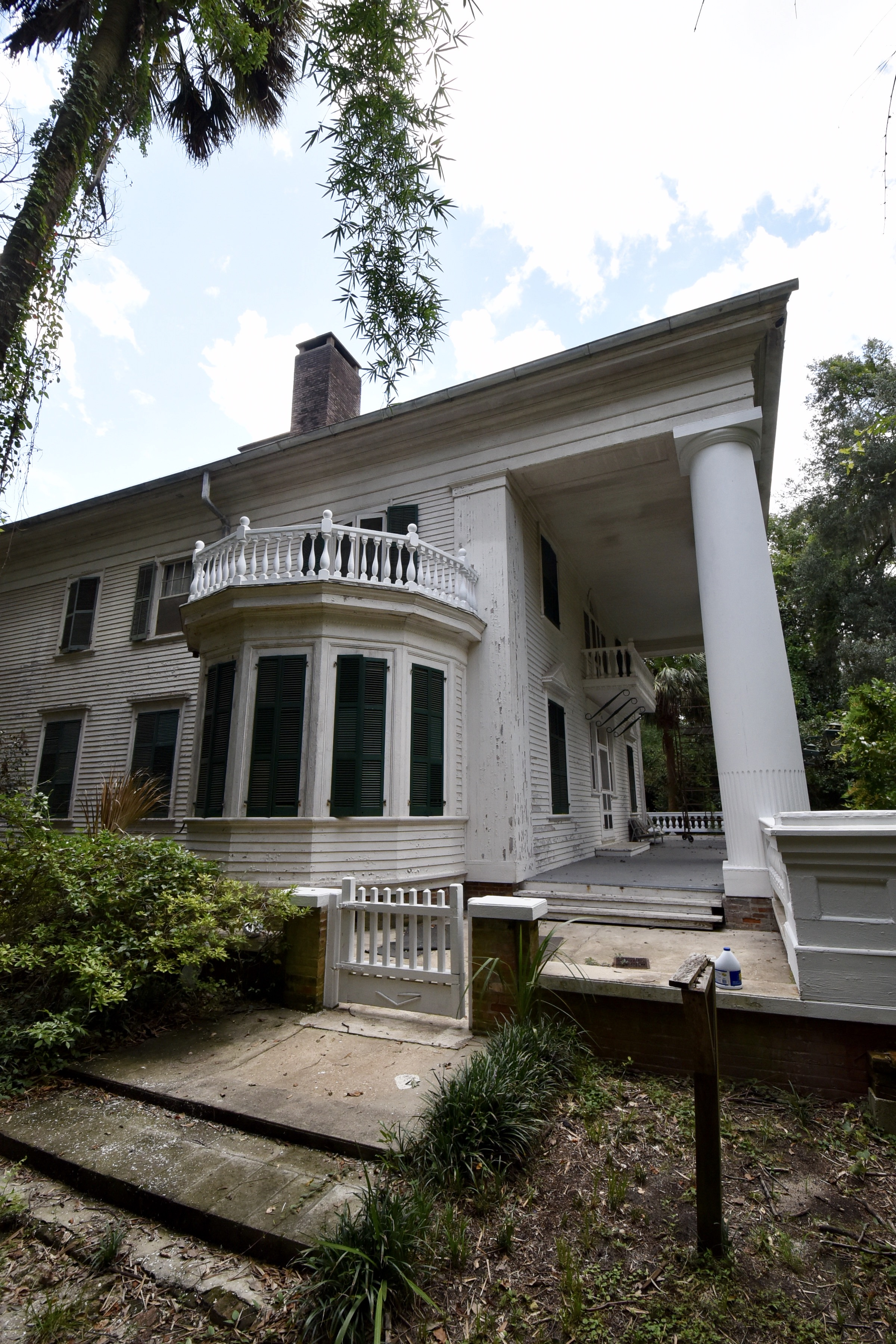

- Location within Georgia Location within the United States
- Location: 711 S. Hansell St., Thomasville, Georgia
- Coordinates: 30.83237°N 83.97209°W
- Area: 1.3 acres (0.53 ha)
- Built: 1891
- Architectural style: Classical Revival
- NRHP reference No.: 70000222
- Added to NRHP: August 12, 1970

Park Front, a house at 711 S. Hansell St. in Thomasville, Georgia, was built in 1891. It was listed on the National Register of Historic Places in 1970. It has also been known as Charles Hebard House and as Frances Stone House.

It was a winter residence for Charles S. Hebard. In 1969 it was owned by Frances Stone.

It was perhaps designed by William Miller or by James Gribben, who both were active architects in the area.

It is a two-and-a-half-story mansion with a two-story portico supported by four columns. Its front doorway has a simple architrave divided in three parts. It has dentils detailing its cornice and fascia. There is a small second-story porch within the portico.

The "Park Front" name derived from its location across from Paradise Park.

The house is also a contributing building in the Paradise Park Historic District, listed on the National Register in 1984.
