= East End Historic District (Thomasville, Georgia) =

Historic district in Georgia, United States

- U.S. National Register of Historic Places
- U.S. Historic district
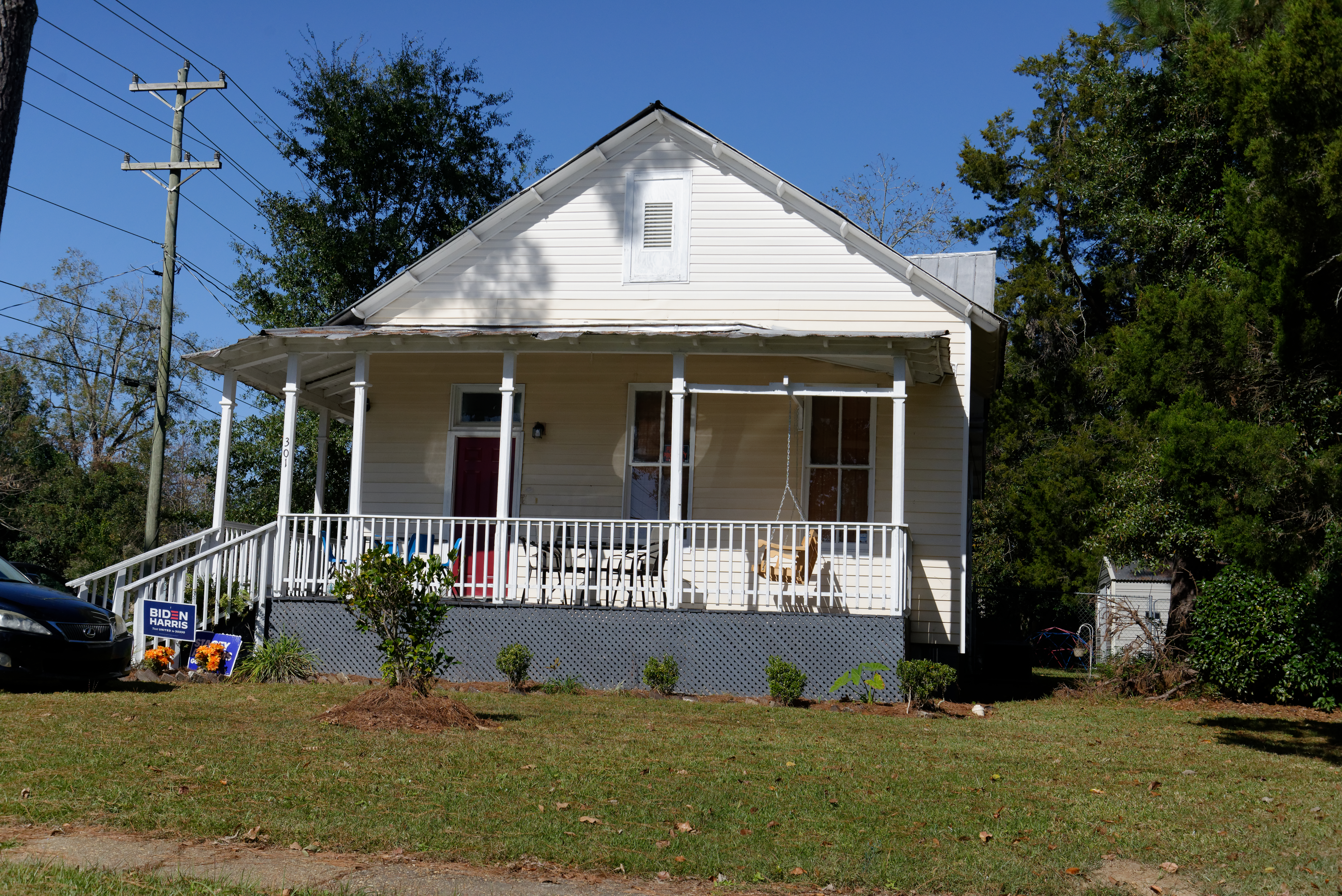
- House on Colton Avenue

- Location within Georgia Location within the United States
- Location: Roughly bounded by Metcalf, Loomis, Colton, and Blackshear Sts. (original); Roughly bounded by Metcalf Ave., Simeon St., Grady St., and East Loomis St. (increase and decrease), Thomasville, Georgia
- Coordinates: 30°49′59″N 83°58′11″W
- Built: 1885
- Architectural style: Bungalow/Craftsman, Late Victorian
- NRHP reference No.: 84001254 (original); 03000677 (increase)

Significant dates
- Added to NRHP: September 7, 1984
- Boundary increase: July 25, 2003

East End Historic District in Thomasville, Georgia was listed on the National Register of Historic Places in 1984, and was amended in 2003 with increases and decreases to its 13-acre (5.3 ha) area. Simple Craftsman-style bungalows are the most common.

One justification for significance of the district is that it "is significant in the area of community planning and development as ... the earliest, documented, planned residential neighborhood in Thomasville and for representing the continued growth and development of a major working-class neighborhood in a community better known for its resort hotels and seasonal residences." Thomasville is asserted to be unique in Georgia "because development during the late 19th century was driven by the city's reputation as a winter resort town for wealthy Northerners", for whom hotels and large "'cottages'" were constructed. (Many examples of these are in the Paradise Park area, listed as Paradise Park Historic District in 1984.)
