= East End Historic District (Middleton, Wisconsin) =

Historic district in Wisconsin, United States

- U.S. National Register of Historic Places
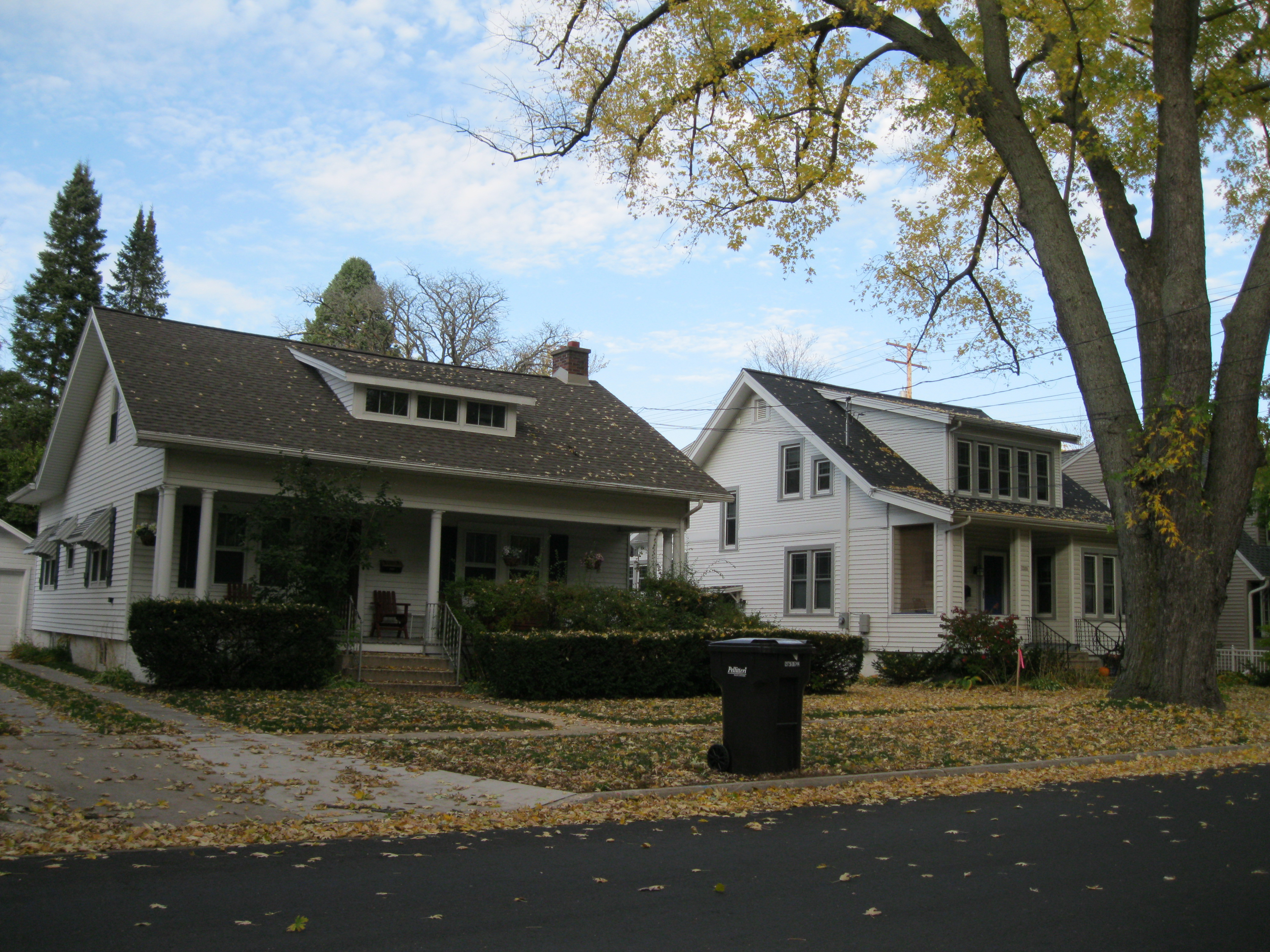
- DiVall bungalow on left.
- Location: 7002-7016 Hubbard Ave., 1812-1916 Park St. (even only) 7002-7227,7233,7235,7237 Elmwood Ave., Middleton, Wisconsin
- Area: 7.5 acres (3.0 ha)
- NRHP reference No.: 03000699
- Added to NRHP: July 25, 2003

The East End Historic District is a residential historic district in Middleton, Wisconsin consisting of 37 modest homes built from the 1920s to 1950s in various styles. The district was added to the National Register of Historic Places in 2003.

In the 1870s the area occupied by today's East End Historic District was platted in large lots and thinly populated. In 1873 only nine buildings were there. The population grew slowly until 1935. Until then, Elmwood Street (then called Slaughter Street) didn't go through from Bristol to Park. In 1935, using money from relief aid, the village connected the street through that gap and replatted some large old lots, creating new small lots. Homes rapidly filled in the lots in the years following.

Due to the late start of construction, there are no homes in older styles like Gothic Revival or Queen Anne. Instead there are a few in American styles like bungalows, and many period revival houses. Here is a good example of each style:

- The Ralph DiVall house at 7010 Hubbard Ave. is a bungalow built in 1925, 1.5 stories with the typical full-width front porch and shed-roofed dormer. DiVall served as Madison's village clerk.

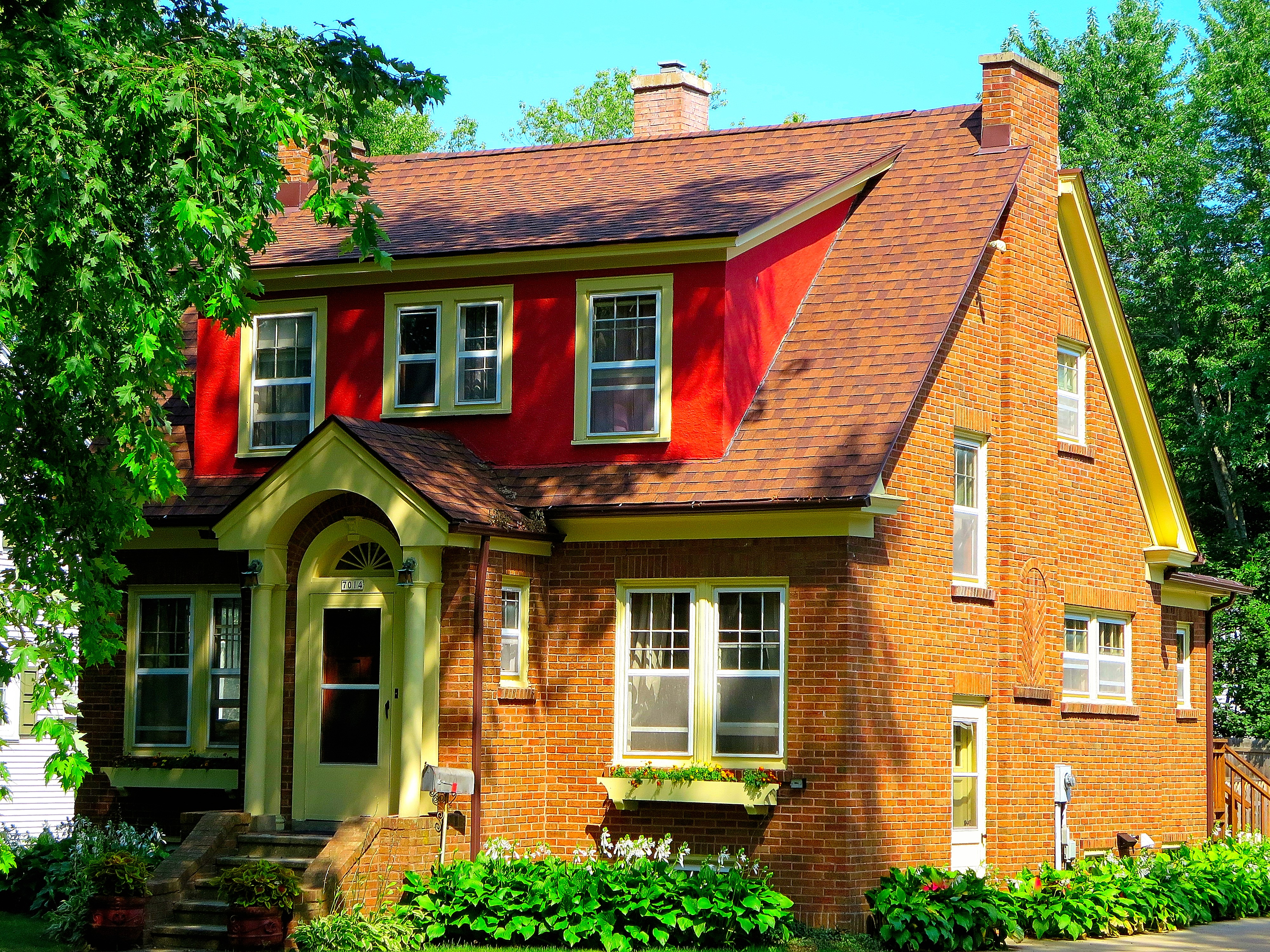
Dr. C.F. Allen house

- The Dr. C.F. Allen house at 7014 Hubbard Ave. is a brick Colonial Revival-styled home built in 1928, 1.5 stories, with the front porch framed in Tuscan columns, a fanlight, and pediment. Dr. Allen was a well-known medical doctor.
- The Albert Loeser house at 1916 Park St. is a 2-story Tudor Revival-styled house built in 1933, clad in carefully cut wood shingles. Identifying characteristics of the style are the steep roof surfaces, the asymmetry, and the dramatic chimney. The small detached garage is styled to match.
- The Charles and Rachel Neuman house at 7208 Elmwood Ave. is a 1 1/2-story house in Dutch Colonial Revival style built in 1937, with a small pediment over the front door, and a flat-roofed sun porch on one end. The identifying characteristic of this style is the gambrel roof.
- The Marcus Schwab house at 7028 Elmwood Ave. is a 1 1/2-story Colonial Revival home built in 1938, 1.5 stories, clad in clapboard, with pilaster strips on the corners and flanking the front door. Schwab was a merchant in Middleton. Roy Brumm built the house.
