= D. B. Anderson and Company Building =

- Anderson, D. B., and Company Building
- U.S. National Register of Historic Places
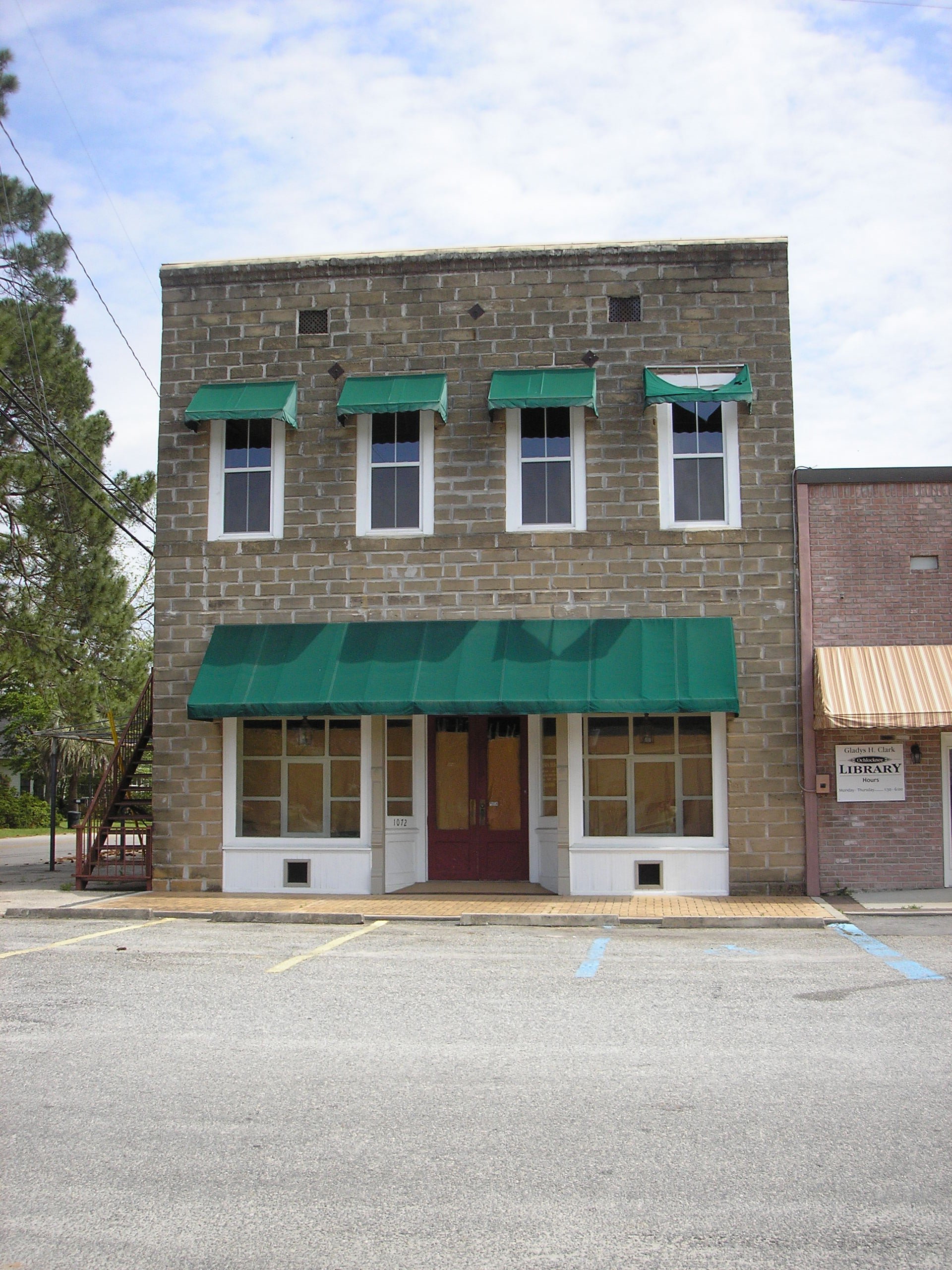

- Location within Georgia Location within the United States
- Location: E. Railroad and Brayton Sts., Ochlocknee, Georgia
- Coordinates: 30°58′28″N 84°03′14.7″W
- Area: 0.1 acres (0.040 ha)
- Built: 1906
- NRHP reference No.: 82002485
- Added to NRHP: August 19, 1982

The D. B. Anderson and Company Building, also known as Segler Building, in Ochlocknee in Thomas County, Georgia, was built in 1906. It is a two-story commercial building built of load-bearing concrete blocks. It is the largest historic commercial structure, and possibly the oldest, in downtown Ochlocknee.

It was listed on the National Register of Historic Places in 1982. It was deemed significant for its serving as a general merchandise store from 1906 until about 1960, under various store names.
