= Stevens Street Historic District =

Historic district in Georgia, United States

- U.S. National Register of Historic Places
- U.S. Historic district
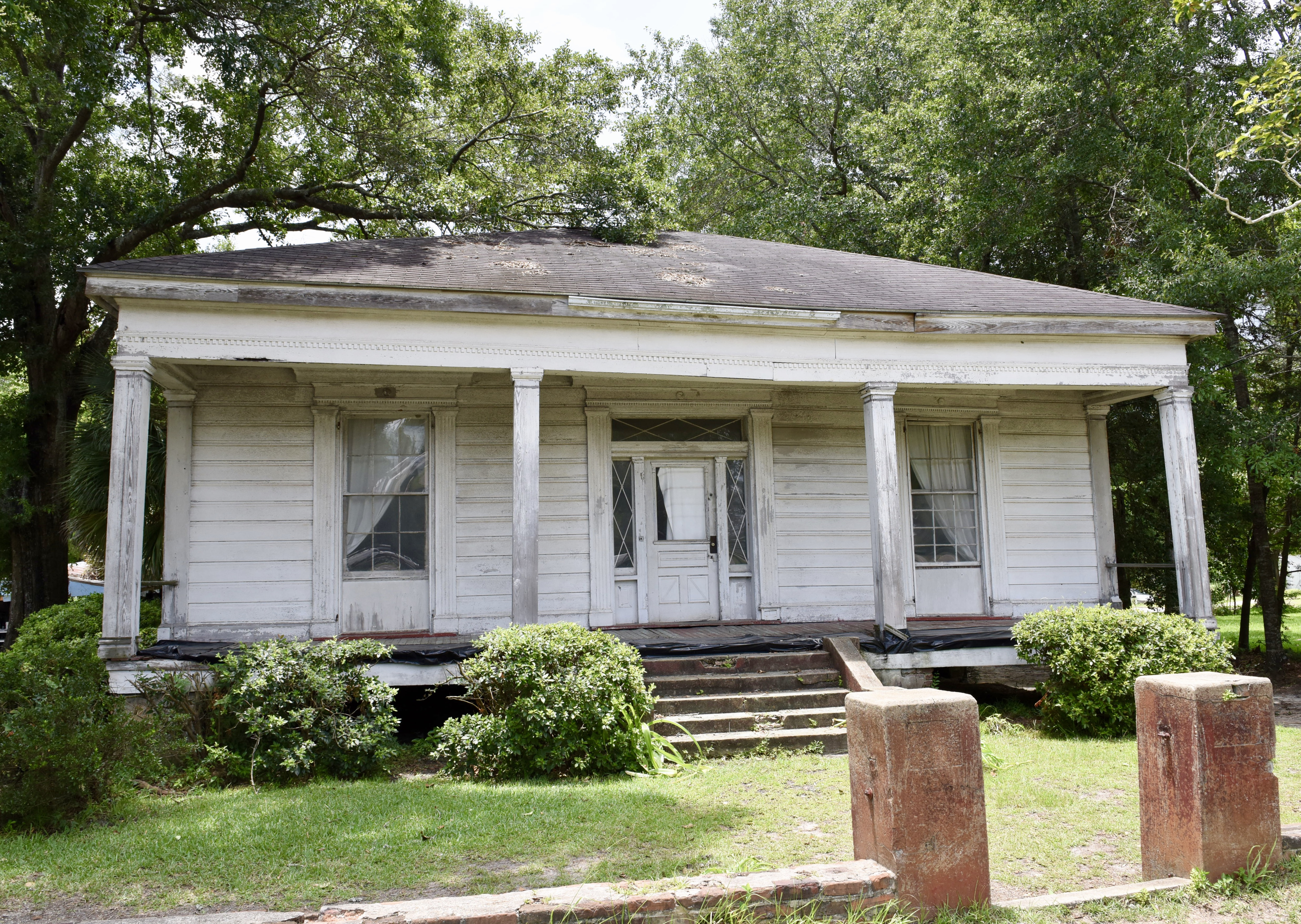

- Location within Georgia Location within the United States
- Location: Along Stevens St., 1 blk. NW of Thomas County Courthouse, Thomasville, Georgia
- Coordinates: 30.841111°N 83.989167°W
- Area: 175 acres (71 ha)
- Built: 1850
- Architectural style: Greek Revival, Colonial Revival, other
- NRHP reference No.: 01000500
- Added to NRHP: May 10, 2001

The Stevens Street Historic District is a 175 acres (71 ha) historic district in Thomasville, Georgia. It is located one block northwest of Thomas County Courthouse.

It was listed on the National Register of Historic Places in 2001. It was noted to be "an intact African-American neighborhood that developed in Thomasville, Thomas County following the end of the Civil War." It then included 341 contributing buildings and three contributing structures, as well as 83 non-contributing structures.

Especially significant buildings include the Clay Street YMCA and the Recreation Center at 404 West Calhoun Street.
