= Boston, Georgia =

- City
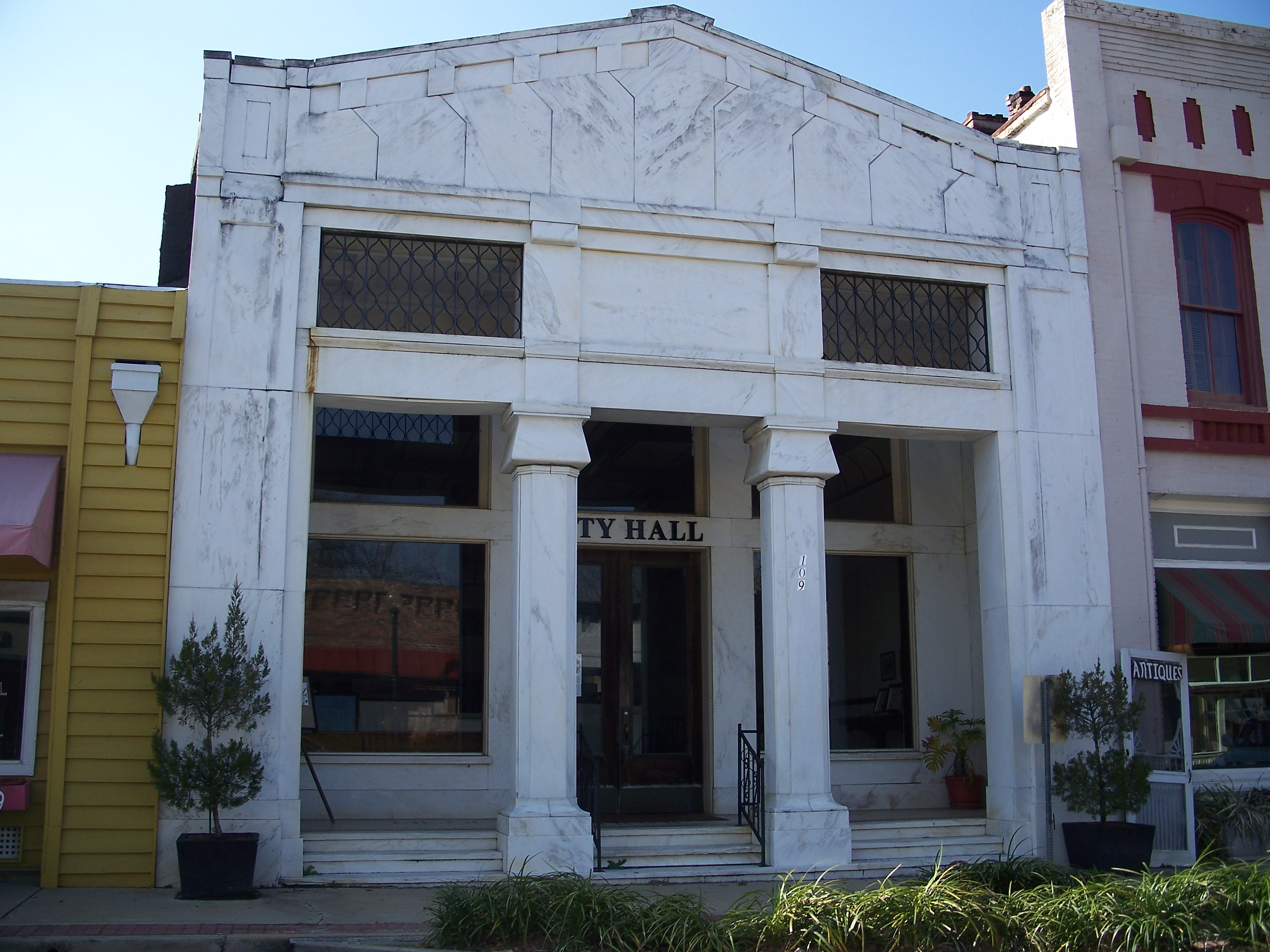
- City Hall

- Location in Thomas County and the state of Georgia
- Coordinates: 30°48′N 83°47′W
- Country: United States
- State: Georgia
- County: Thomas

Government
  - Mayor: Danny Groover

Area
  - Total: 2.26 sq mi (5.85 km^{2})
  - Land: 2.25 sq mi (5.84 km^{2})
  - Water: 0.0039 sq mi (0.01 km^{2})
- Elevation: 207 ft (63 m)

Population (2020)
  - Total: 1,207
  - Density: 535.7/sq mi (206.85/km^{2})
- Time zone: UTC-5 (Eastern (EST))
  - Summer (DST): UTC-4 (EDT)
- ZIP code: 31626
- Area code: 229
- FIPS code: 13-09460
- GNIS feature ID: 0311663
- Website: http://www.bostonga.com/

Boston is a city in Thomas County, Georgia, United States. As of the 2020 census, the city had a population of 1,207.

== History ==
Boston was incorporated by the Georgia General Assembly in 1870. An early variant name was "Blue Springs"; the present name is after Thomas M. Boston, who found a medicinal spring near the town site. Boston is home to one of the original Carnegie Libraries, and one of a handful in Georgia that is still being used as a library. Boston is also home to the Dillon Candy Company, the oldest candy company in Georgia that began operations in 1918.

== Geography ==
Boston is located at 30°48′N 83°47′W (30.7926, -83.7907). According to the United States Census Bureau, the city has a total area of 2.2 square miles (5.7 km^{2}), all land. It is 107 miles east of Dothan, Alabama and 21 miles west of Valdosta.

== Demographics ==
Historical population
| Census | Pop. | Note | %± |
|---|---|---|---|
| 1880 | 360 | | — |
| 1890 | 646 | | 79.4% |
| 1900 | 722 | | 11.8% |
| 1910 | 1,130 | | 56.5% |
| 1920 | 1,640 | | 45.1% |
| 1930 | 1,243 | | −24.2% |
| 1940 | 1,099 | | −11.6% |
| 1950 | 1,035 | | −5.8% |
| 1960 | 1,357 | | 31.1% |
| 1970 | 1,443 | | 6.3% |
| 1980 | 1,424 | | −1.3% |
| 1990 | 1,395 | | −2.0% |
| 2000 | 1,417 | | 1.6% |
| 2010 | 1,315 | | −7.2% |
| 2020 | 1,207 | | −8.2% |
U.S. Decennial Census; 1850-1870 1870-1880; 1890-1910 1920-1930; 1940 1950 1960; 1970 1980 1990; 2000 2010 2020

=== Racial and ethnic composition ===
Boston city, Georgia – racial and ethnic composition (NH = Non-Hispanic) Note: the US Census treats Hispanic/Latino as an ethnic category. This table excludes Latinos from the racial categories and assigns them to a separate category. Hispanics/Latinos may be of any race.
| Race / ethnicity | Pop. 2010 | Pop. 2020 | % 2010 | % 2020 |
|---|---|---|---|---|
| White alone (NH) | 426 | 392 | 32.40% | 32.48% |
| Black or African American alone (NH) | 854 | 725 | 64.94% | 60.07% |
| Native American or Alaska Native alone (NH) | 6 | 3 | 0.46% | 0.25% |
| Asian alone (NH) | 0 | 0 | 0.00% | 0.00% |
| Pacific Islander alone (NH) | 0 | 0 | 0.00% | 0.00% |
| Some other race alone (NH) | 0 | 2 | 0.00% | 0.17% |
| Mixed race/multi-racial (NH) | 2 | 21 | 0.15% | 1.74% |
| Hispanic or Latino (any race) | 27 | 64 | 2.05% | 5.30% |
| Total | 1,315 | 1,207 | 100.00% | 100.00% |

=== 2020 census ===
As of the 2020 census, Boston had a population of 1,207, down from 1,315 in 2010.

The median age was 42.4 years. 22.7% of residents were under the age of 18 and 17.6% were 65 years of age or older. For every 100 females there were 82.6 males, and for every 100 females age 18 and over there were 77.4 males age 18 and over.

There were 518 households, of which 30.9% had children under the age of 18 living in them. Of all households, 35.1% were married-couple households, 18.9% were households with a male householder and no spouse or partner present, and 40.5% were households with a female householder and no spouse or partner present. About 31.9% of all households were made up of individuals and 15.4% had someone living alone who was 65 years of age or older. There were 597 housing units, of which 13.2% were vacant. The homeowner vacancy rate was 0.0% and the rental vacancy rate was 6.9%.

0.0% of residents lived in urban areas, while 100.0% lived in rural areas.
