= Augustine Hansell House =

Historic house in Georgia, United States

- U.S. National Register of Historic Places
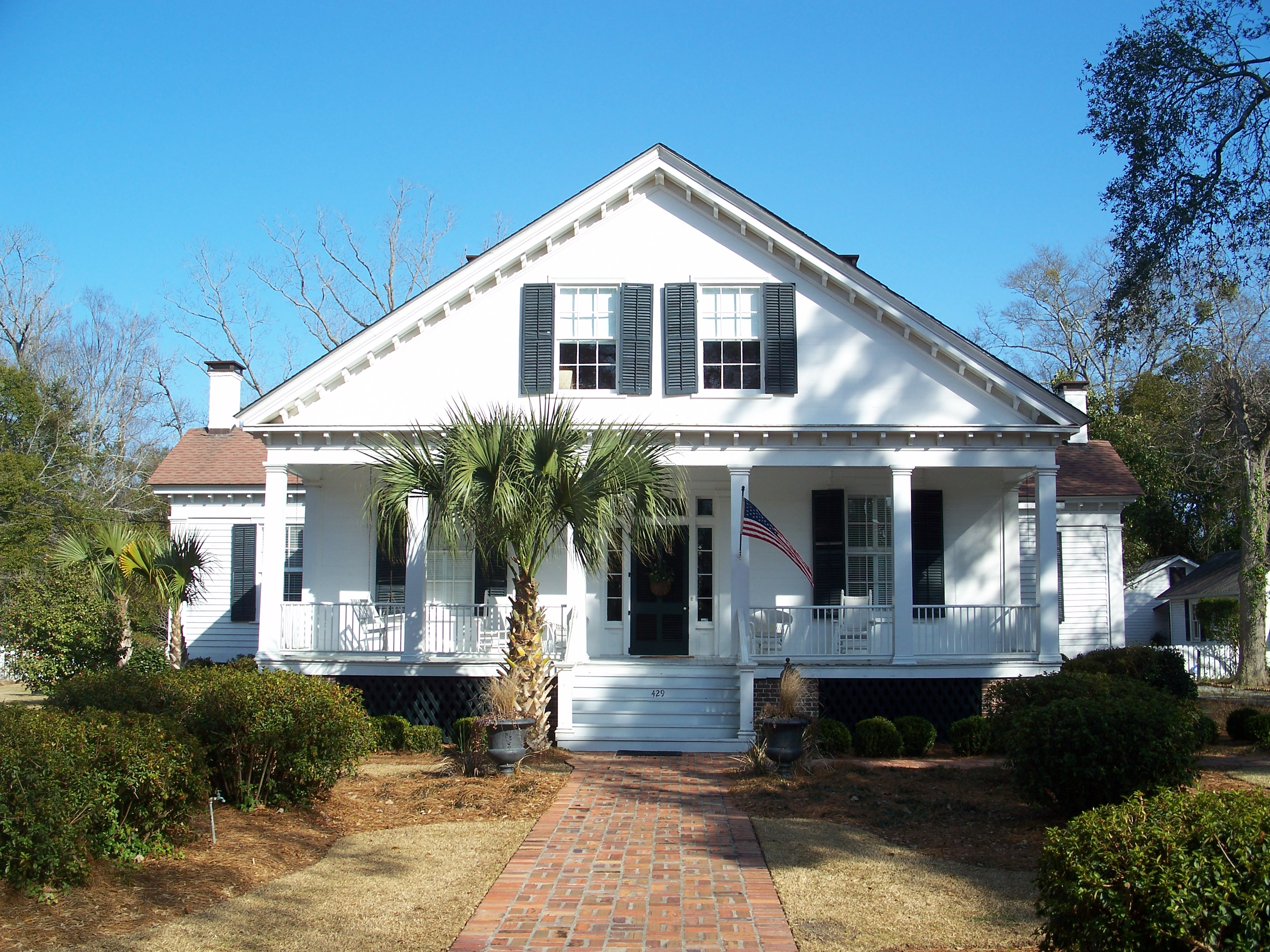

- Location within Georgia Location within the United States
- Location: 429 S. Hansell St., Thomasville, Georgia
- Coordinates: 30°50′13″N 83°58′16″W
- Area: 2.9 acres (1.2 ha)
- Built: 1852-53, 1927
- Architect: Wind, John
- Architectural style: Greek Revival
- NRHP reference No.: 70000221
- Added to NRHP: June 22, 1970

The Augustine Hansell House, also known as Jeffries House, is a historic home of exceptional quality in Thomasville, Georgia, United States. It was listed on the National Register of Historic Places in 1970.

== History ==
It was designed by architect John Wind, the leading architect of Thomas County, in Greek Revival style. A 1 1/2-story cottage, it was built during 1852–53 for Augustine Hansell. Hansell, who later (1869) was mayor of Thomasville, was a judge of the Superior Court of the Southern Judicial Circuit. He also organized the Thomas Reserves and was commander of a militia company of Thomas County. He was a lieutenant in the Thomas Reserves.

The American Civil War did not bring fighting to Thomas County, with the closest battle being the Battle of Natural Bridge in Natural Bridge, Florida, 56 miles (90 km) away from Thomasville.

The house is a 1 1/2-story wood-frame cottage, with the main house having four rooms in a center-hall plan. It has an overhanging portico supported by six square columns and two small windows centered in the gable front.

Its interior is little-altered from the original and has Greek Revival details in its doorways, stairway, and four fireplaces with carved mantels. The addition of wings for a kitchen and a bedroom in 1927 did not detract from the architectural character of the house.

Up to 1969 the house had remained in the same family and was then owned by a granddaughter of Augustine Hansell. It has been described as one of the "three best cottages" in Thomasville.
