= Paradise Park Historic District =

Historic district in Georgia, United States

- U.S. National Register of Historic Places
- U.S. Historic district
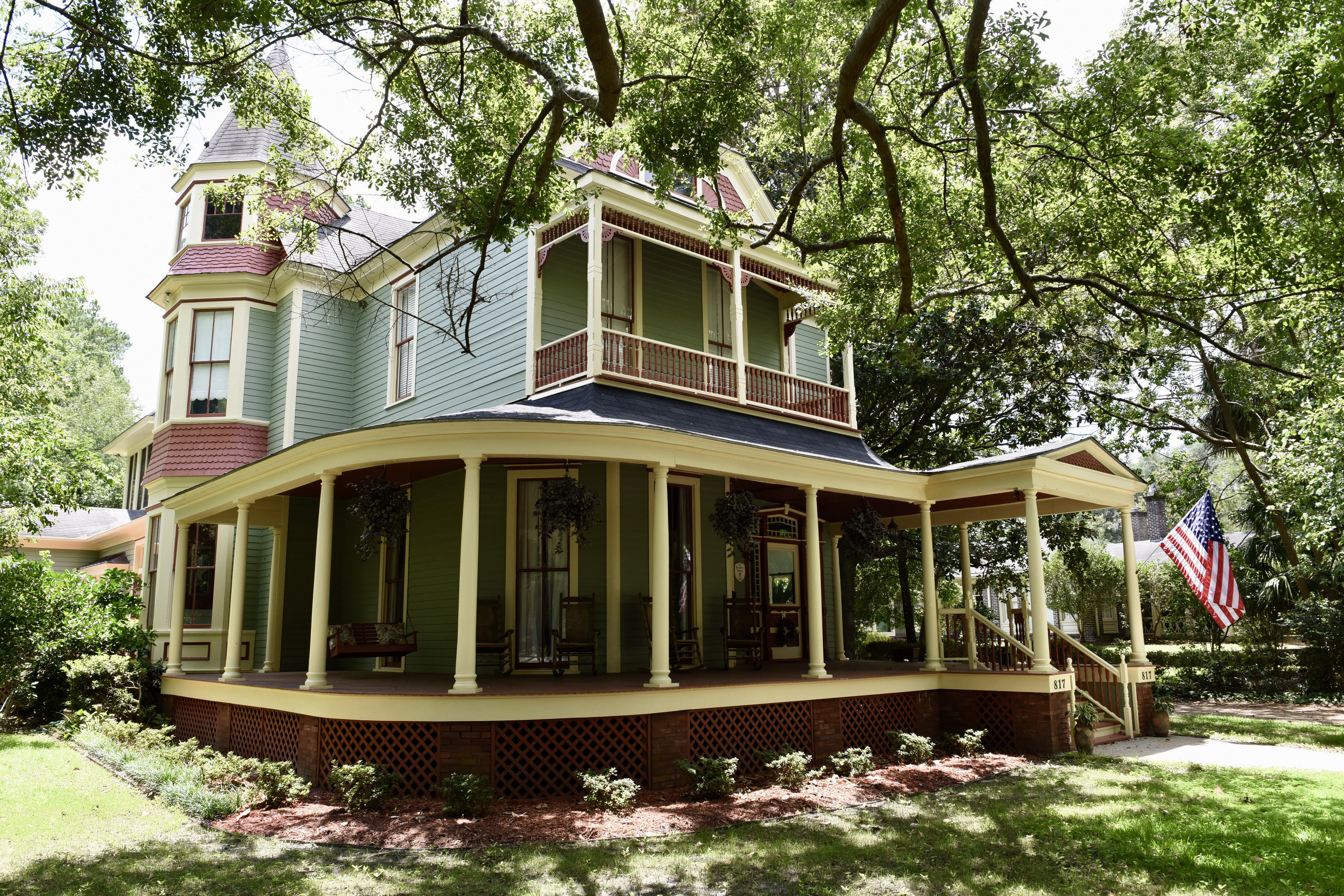

- Location within Georgia Location within the United States
- Location: Roughly bounded by Metcalf Ave., Colton, Broad, and Loomis Sts. (original), 502 S. Broad St. (increase), Thomasville, Georgia
- Coordinates: 30°49′56″N 83°58′25″W
- Built: 1907
- Architect: Roderick Brantley, Joe Robinson
- Architectural style: Late 19th And 20th Century Revivals, Late Victorian, Classical Revival, Modern Movement
- NRHP reference No.: 84001256 (original); 02000292 (increase)

Significant dates
- Added to NRHP: September 7, 1984
- Boundary increase: April 1, 2002

Paradise Park Historic District is located in Thomasville, Georgia. It was listed on the National Register of Historic Places 1984 with an increase in 2002. It consists of Thomasville's Paradise Park, and properties including 15 contributing buildings and one non-contributing building.

The area, subdivided from the S. Alexander Smith estate, was known as "Yankee's Paradise" at the turn of the 20th century, when Northern visitors had winter homes and cottages in the area. Residents included George Forbes, owner of Forbes Furniture and Hardware; W.S. Keefer, president of the Thomasville Cigar Company; Charles Hebard, a Philadelphia-based lumber "magnate"; and Judge Strawbridge, a clothing distributor.

The increase added the property at 502 South Broad Street as a contributing building and provided documentation justifying reclassification to "contributing" of a previously non-contributing building.

At the time of National Register listing, "East Hansell" was the name of the street along the southeast side of the park. By 2013 the street was termed "South Hansell". The street continues as West Hansell across Broad Street. (Note: In 2017, Google maps shows the street as South Hansell, with West Hansell being the street's continuation across Broad Street. Note that parallel to Hansell Street, one block southeast, is Loomis Street, divided as West Loomis vs. East Loomis by Broad Street. Google Streetview's July 2013 imagery shows a doctor's office sign indicating 805 S. Hansell as the address of one property. There's no indication that house numbers were changed.)

Contributing buildings include:

- Hebard House (1891 or 1899-1900), 711 East Hansell, likely constructed by builder William Miller, built as a winter residence for Charles S. Hebard. Separately listed on the National Register in 1970 as "Park Front". It is a two-and-a-half-story mansion with a two-story portico supported by four columns, enclosing a small second-story porch. Its front doorway has a simple architrave divided in three parts. It has dentils detailing its cornice and fascia.
- Keefer House, 817 South Hansell Street, a large Victorian Eclectic house, bordered by a white picket fence. Built in 1893. Originally owned by William Scott Keefer. William owned an ice plant in Thomasville.
- 701 East Hansell
- 110 East Hansell (Note: Perhaps 110 is a typo in the NRHP document?)
- Buildings on others of the nine properties on East Hansell Street facing the park.
- Historic carriage house of one of the East Hansell Street properties. Perhaps this is the one property on East Loomis Street.
- 900 South Broad
- Strawbridge House (1899), 704 South Broad, constructed by builder James Gribben.
- Tuck House (1940), 701 South Broad Street. One-story ranch house with "applied Greek Revival elements", built for Dr. and Mrs. Albert C. Tuck, designed by Roderick Brantley. It serves as McDonald's area office. (Note: Sign with McDonald's logo designating as "Area Office / Locally owned and operated by T.C. Metzner", appears in Google Streetview, from July 2013, accessed April 2017. Per Google maps, it may be a Ronald McDonald House.) Not deemed to be historic in the original historic district, due to its date of construction, but later accepted. The property at 701 South Broad is bordered by an old wrought-iron fence.
- Neel House (1907), 502 South Broad Street, a two-story Neoclassical house with full-height portico and one-story porch with classical columns. Converted to apartments in 1930, damaged by fire in 1978, became a bed-and-breakfast inn sometime later. Not included in original historic district due to owner objection.
