= East Side School (Thomasville, Georgia) =

- U.S. National Register of Historic Places
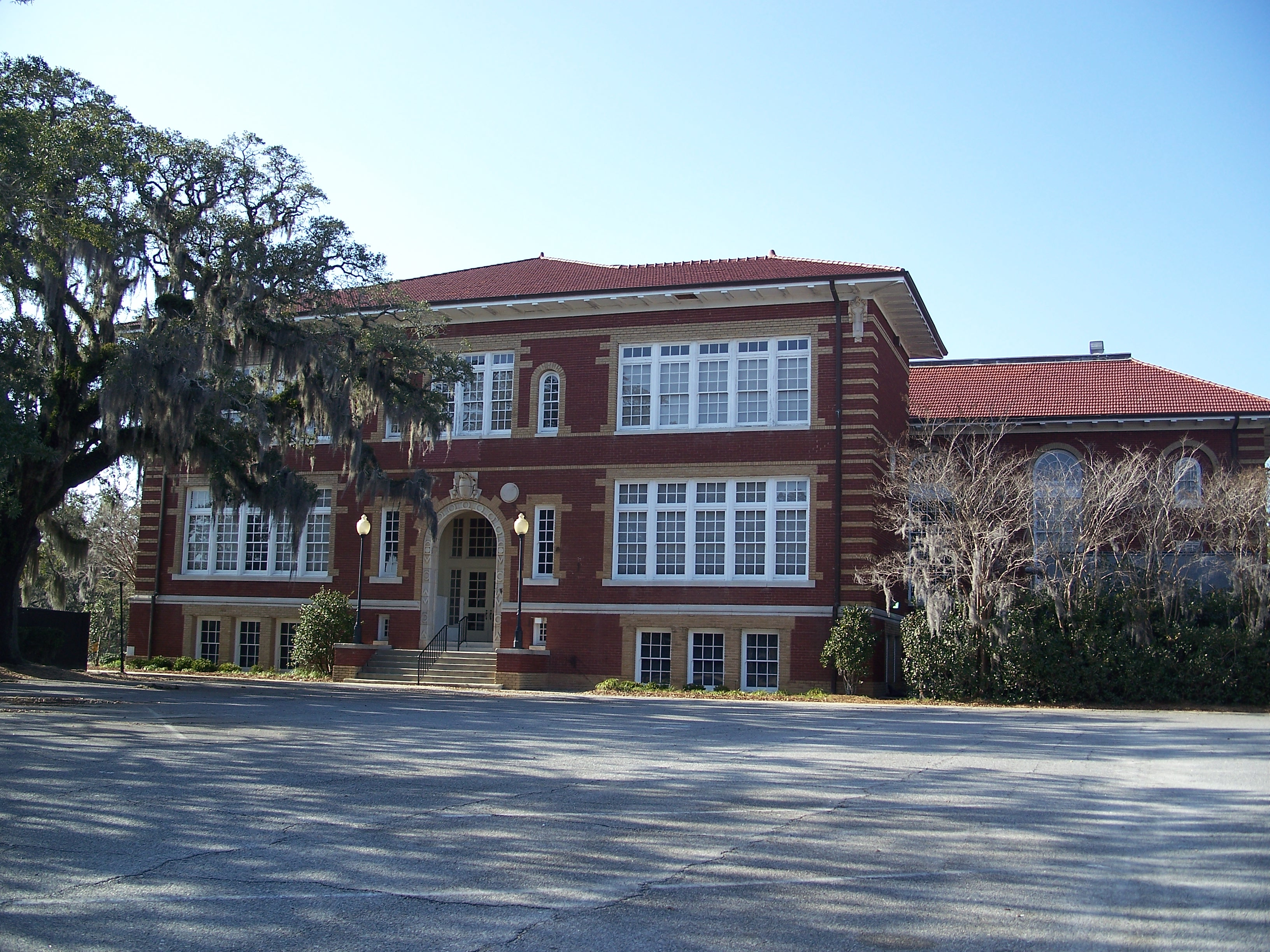

- Location within Georgia Location within the United States
- Location: 120 N. Hansell St., Thomasville, Georgia
- Coordinates: 30.843611°N 83.974444°W
- Area: 5 acres (2.0 ha)
- Built: 1915
- Built by: Clayton
- NRHP reference No.: 77000444
- Added to NRHP: December 16, 1977

The East Side School in Thomasville, Georgia, United States was built in 1915 and was the first purpose-built public school building in Thomas County. It was listed on the National Register of Historic Places in 1977.

It is a two-story-with-basement T-shaped brick red building. Its brick is laid in common bond and it has buff-colored brick trim at windows, entrances, and corner quoins. Terra cotta is also used in detailing; the roof is red vitrified clay tile. Its NRHP nomination asserts that "The most outstanding feature of the interior is the flooring. All of the floors are of rift pine, i.e., quarter sawn, long leaf yellow pine of virgin growth, cut in the Thomasville area."

It was built to serve the first seven grades; other grades were covered by the high school, which was in an 1875 brick building which had served as South Georgia College of Agriculture and Mechanical Art.

It served as a school until 1976.

It was presumably for white students only when built; the date of desegregation, if that occurred before closure, is not noted.
