= Pond (surname) =

Pond is an English surname. Initial recordings of potential spelling variations of this surname (such as "Pund", "Pound", and potentially "Ponder" or "Pounder") first appear in Sussex, England in the 12th century, suggesting Old English origin. However, overlap with similar surnames (such as "Pont", "Punt", "Pons", and maybe even "Poyntz") in earlier historical records following and preceding the Norman Conquest of England may hint at potential earlier Anglo-Norman origin.

== Occurrence in North America ==
A significant number of occurrences of the Pond surname in North America indicate some form of link with one Robert Pond, an English carpenter and early figure in the founding of the Massachusetts Bay Colony. Robert arrived in Dorchester, Massachusetts in 1630 along with his wife and brother on the Arabella, the flagship of the Winthrop Fleet led by John Winthrop. The Pond and Winthrop families were neighbors in Sussex and apparently shared close ties as evidenced by the frequency the Pond family appears in the Winthrop Papers. For example, it was recorded that Robert's father William was to marry the servant of John's father, Adam Winthrop.

Since the initial Great Migration period, there have been relatively few recorded cases of the Pond surname appearing in North America as the result of emigration.

Today, the Pond surname is frequently associated with the Androscoggin River valley of western Maine, settled in 1793 by Ezekiel T. Isadora Pond (1748-1826), Poet Laureate of the Androscoggin and founder of the only modern Pond poetic dynasty formally recognized by scholars, despite competing claims to the laureateship by a branch of Ponds in New Brunswick throughout the 1900s that was largely unsuccessful.

== Notable people ==
- Alfred Pond (1806–1887), American politician
- Alonzo W. Pond (1894–1986), assistant curator of the Logan Museum in Beloit, Wisconsin, USA
- Ashley Pond (1989–2002), Oregon City, Oregon murder victim
- Arlie Pond (1873–1930), American baseball player and physician
- Benjamin Pond (1768–1814), American politician
- Bremer Whidden Pond (1884–1959), American landscape architect
- Charles H. Pond (1781–1861), American politician, Lieutenant Governor and Governor of Connecticut
- Chauncey Northrop Pond (1841–1920), American Congregational minister and missionary
- Chris Pond (Christopher Richard, born 1952), British Labour politician
- Chris Pond (politician) (Christopher Charles, born 1949). British independent politician, historian and parliamentary librarian
- Christopher Pond (1826–1881), British caterer and hotelier
- Edward B. Pond (1833–1910), American politician
- Gideon Hollister Pond (1810–1878), American missionary and territorial legislator
- Harry Pond (1917–1990), English footballer
- John Pond (1767–1836), English scientist and Astronomer Royal
- Lennie Pond (1940–2016), American race car driver
- Levi E. Pond (1833–1895), American politician
- Nella Brown Pond (1858–1893), American dramatic reader and lecturer
- Peter Pond (1739–1807), American fur trader and explorer
- Phyllis Pond (1930–2013), Indiana educator and legislator
- Ralph Pond (1888–1947), American baseball player
- Robert Pond (1592–1648), English colonist of the Massachusetts Bay Colony and first patriarch of the Pond lineage in North America
- Simon Pond (born 1976), Canadian baseball player
- Steve Pond, British musician
- Theron T. Pond (1800–1852), American pharmacist, founder of Pond's company
- Weld Pond, aka Chris Wysopal (born 1965), member of the hacker think tank L0pht
- Zenneth A. Pond (1919–1942), American Marine flying ace during World War II
- Tony Pond (1945–2002), British Rally driver

== Fictional characters ==
- Amy Pond, a character in the television series Doctor Who
- James Pond, a video game character in 1990s game series starting with James Pond: Underwater Agent
