= Pounder =

Pounder may refer to:

- Pounder (surname), a surname
- Pounder (EP), 2015 Nuclear Assault album
- Post pounder, a tool used for driving posts into the ground
- Rice pounder, an agricultural tool
- Caliber#Pounds as a measure of cannon bore, a method of rating artillery pieces
- Pounder beer can, a 16-US-fluid-ounce (473 ml) can of beer

== See also ==
- James Pounder Whitney (1857–1939), British historian
- Ponder (disambiguation)
- Pound (disambiguation)
- Pounders
- Pounding
- Pounding (song)
