= Ponder House =

Ponder House may refer to:

- Ephraim Ponder House, Thomasville, Georgia, United States
- Ephraim G. Ponder's former house in Atlanta, Georgia, the so-called "Potter House," which became a target for Union artillery during the American Civil War
