= Pound =

Pound or Pounds may refer to:

== Units ==
- Pound (currency), various units of currency
  - Pound sterling, the official currency of the United Kingdom
- Pound (mass), a unit of mass
- Pound (force), a unit of force
- Rail pound, in rail profile
- A basis weight of paper, related to grammage

== Symbols ==
- Pound sign, £, the symbol for the pound as a unit of currency
- Number sign (also pound sign), the symbol #

== Places in the United States ==
- Pound, Virginia, a town
- Pound, Wisconsin, a village
- Pound (town), Wisconsin, a town
- Pound Ridge, New York, a town

== Entertainment ==
- Pound (band), an American rock band
- Pound (film), a 1970 film directed and written by Robert Downey, Sr.
- Nerdluck Pound, a fictional alien character in the 1996 animated film Space Jam

== Other uses ==
- Pound (surname), a list of people
- Pounds (surname), a list of people
- Animal shelter (also a "pound"), a facility that houses homeless, lost, or abandoned animals
- Animal pound, a similar structure
- Buffalo pound, a hunting structure used by indigenous North Americans to trap bison (buffalo)
- Canal pound, the stretch of level water impounded between two canal locks
- Fist bump (also a "pound" or a "fist pound"), a gesture similar in meaning to a handshake or high five
- Pound (magazine), a Toronto-based hip hop magazine
- Pound (networking), a lightweight open source reverse proxy program and application firewall
- Pounds, shillings and pence or £sd, British and other European pre-decimal currency
- Vehicle impoundment

== See also ==
- Pond (disambiguation)
