= Flipper family =

Notable African-Americans

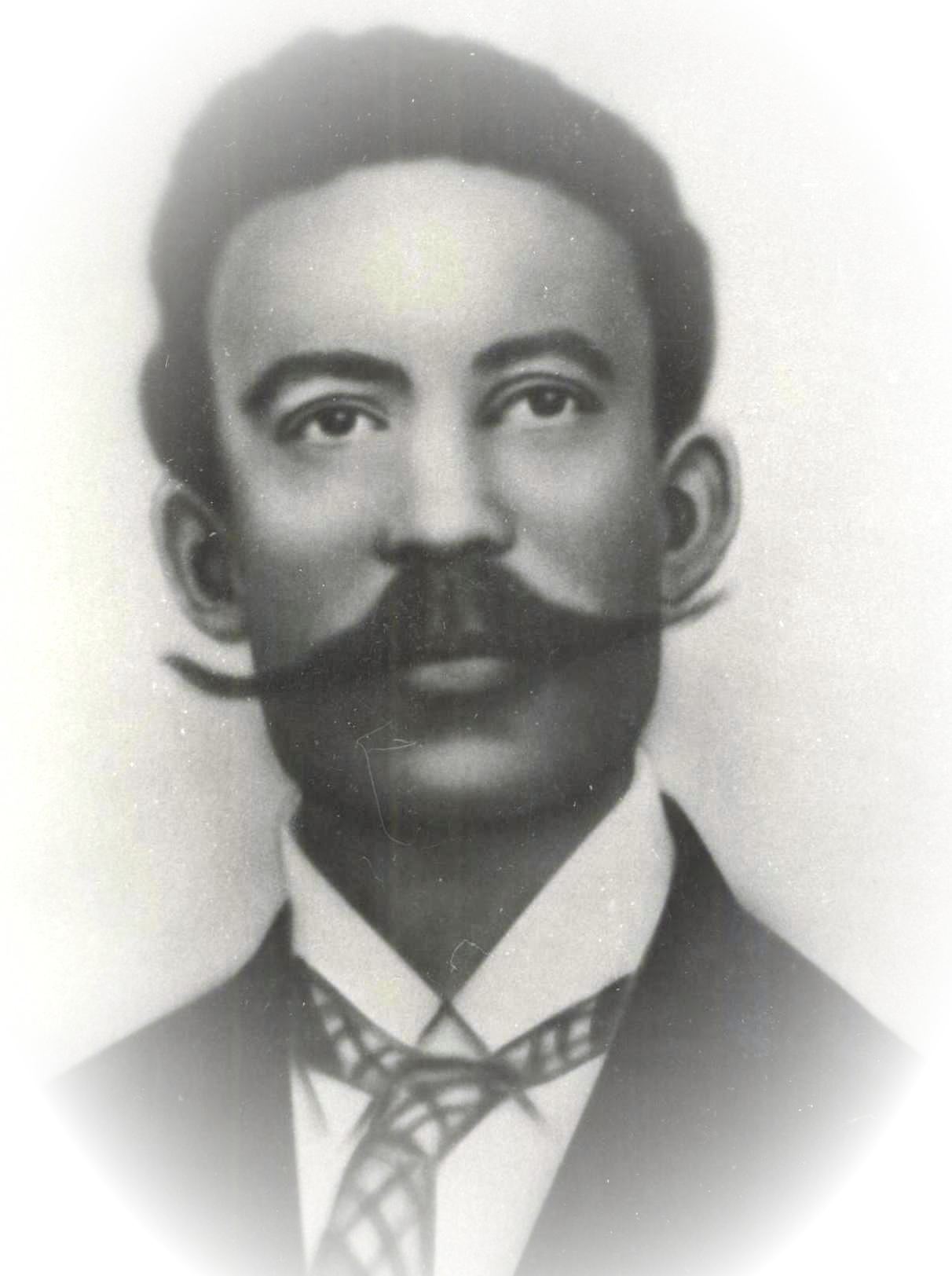
Carl Flipper, who taught leatherwork and shoemaking at an industrial school.

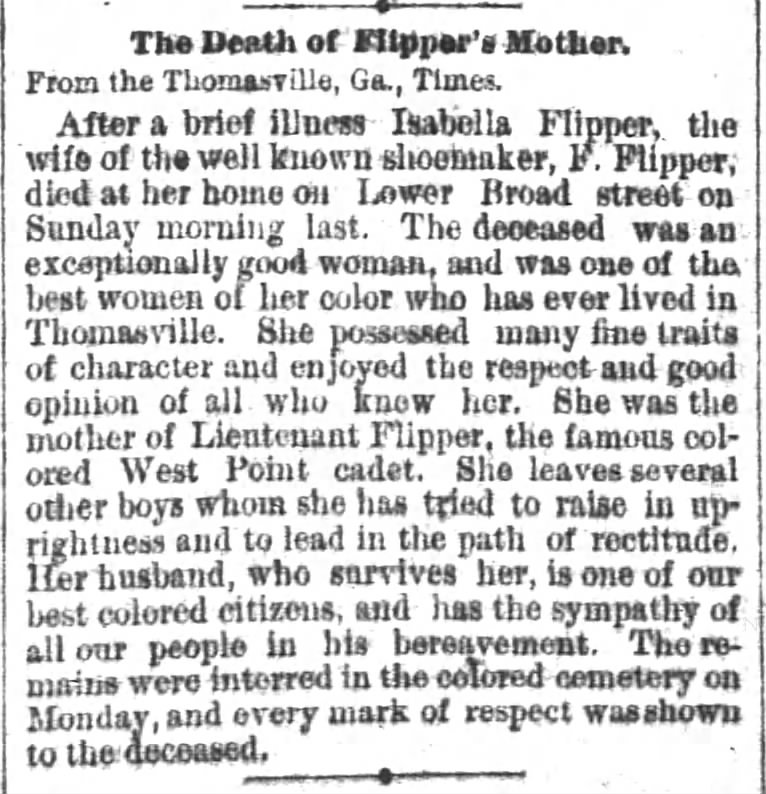
"The Death of Flipper's Mother" (The Atlanta Constitution, August 29, 1887)

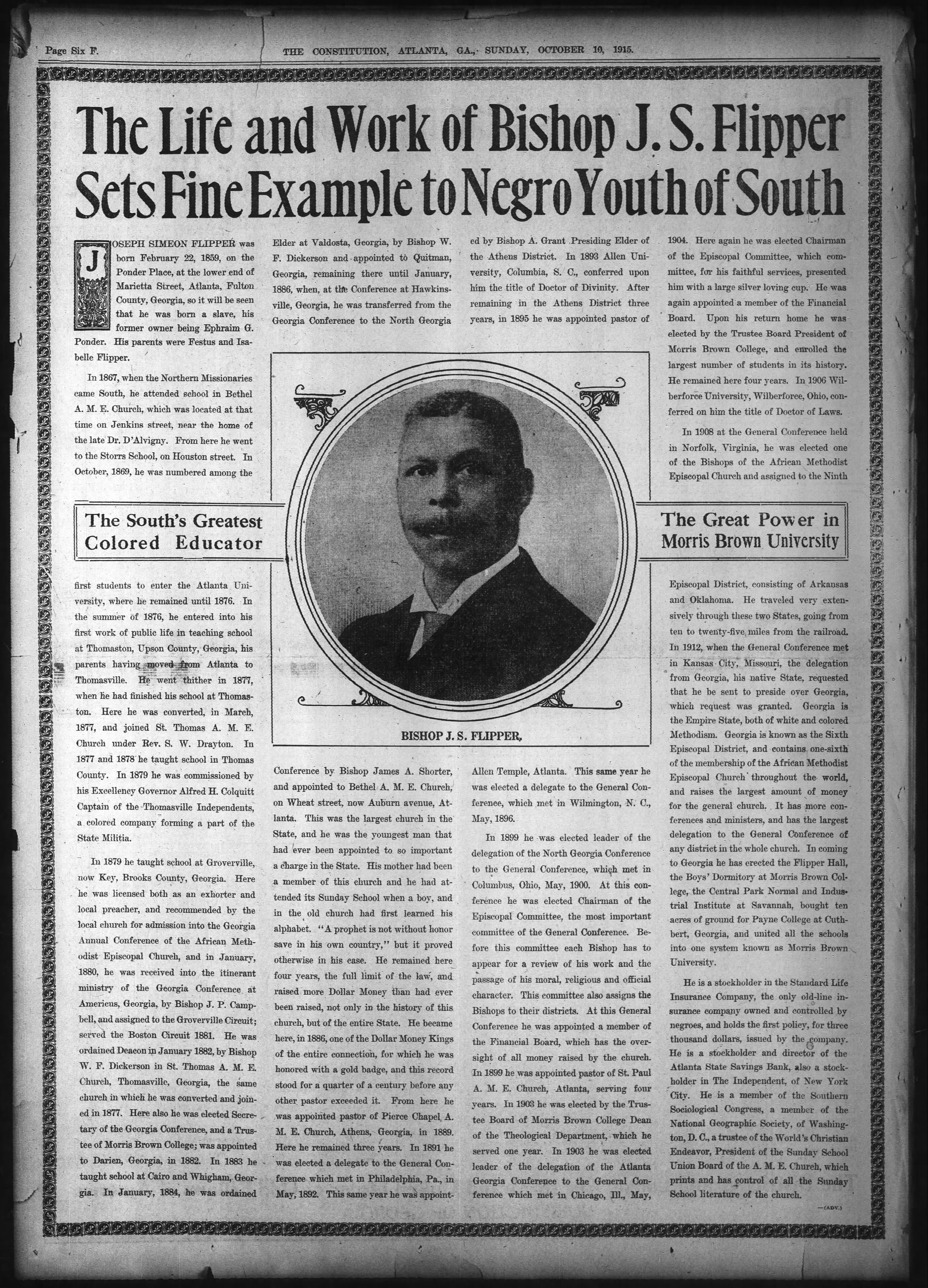
Advertorial biography of Rev. J. S. Flipper (The Atlanta Constitution, 1915)

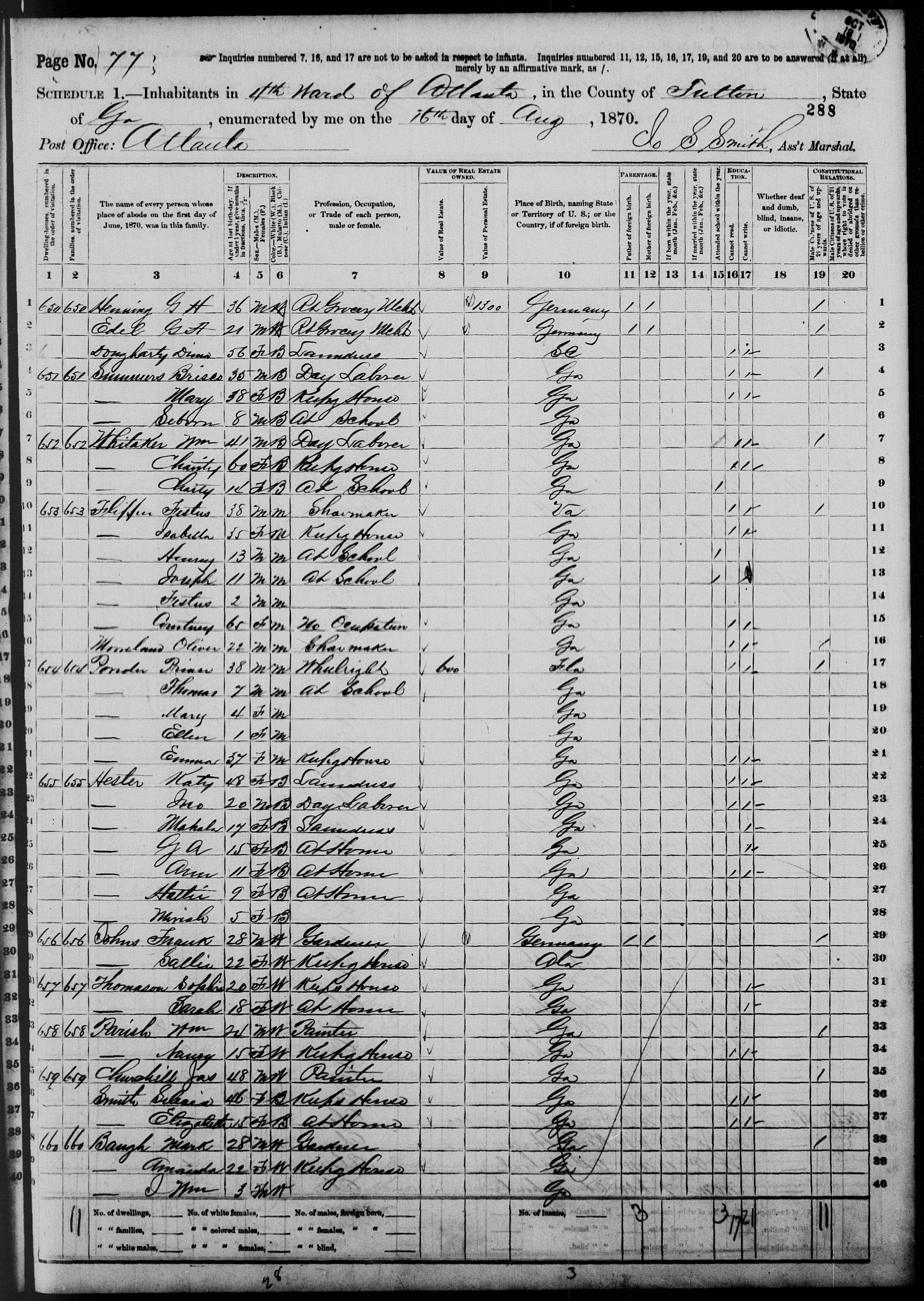
The Flipper family in Atlanta in the 1870 census; their neighbor, Prince Ponder, a wheelwright, had also been enslaved by the Ponders

The Flipper family is a notable African-American family of the United States. Legally enslaved in Georgia prior to emancipation, the family produced entrepreneurs, ministers, educators, and a civil engineer and history writer who was also the first black graduate of West Point.

- Festus Flipper Sr. (1832–1917) – Born in Virginia, Flipper was trafficked to far-southern Georgia or panhandle Florida by the Ponder slave-trading family. The first appearance of Flipper in the historical record is in 1855, when he was sold as a part of the estate of James Ponder, who had died 1851. Ponder's estate sold Flipper, described as a "Negro bootmaker," at auction for US$1,810 (equivalent to $62,542 in 2025), while "Ponder's other slaves 'sold reasonably high.'" James Ponder had most likely used Flipper as part of an industrial-scale shoemaking operation, as in 1848, Ephraim Ponder wrote William Ponder from the Richmond, Virginia slave market that he purchased a shoemaker for $250 "for James" and hoped to buy another before they drove south with the purchased slaves. In summer 1851 Ponder advertised in the Florida Sentinel that he would have 2,000 "negro shoes" delivered for sale by October. According to Henry Flipper writing in 1936, "[Ephraim] Ponder had established in Atlanta in 1857 a factory where he manufactured buggies, carriages, wagons, carts, stage coaches, plows and boots and shoes, gathering the best Negro mechanics he could from various places in the South, the writer's father being brought from Fredericksburg, Virginia, as carriage trimmer and boot and shoemaker." Ponder filed for divorce from his wife in 1861, and Ellen Ponder remained in the Atlanta house (called "the Ponder place") until 1864 when she fled the approaching U.S. Army for Macon, then to Fort Valley. Flipper recounts that the mechanics attached to the Ponder estate hired out their time on their own authority and then paid a portion of the earnings to Mrs. Ponder. Mrs. Ponder would frequently threaten to sell south to the especially perilous Red River country slaves with whom she was frustrated, but the pending divorce meant that she could not. After the American Civil War, Festus Flipper ran his own shoe and bootmaking shop at 11 Decatur, 42 Decatur Street, and 37 Marietta near DeGive's Opera House. He was registered to vote on July 19, 1867. In an 1871 boosters' guide to Atlanta, F. Flipper warranted a mention at the end of three pages about the boot and shoe commerce in the city: "Our other shoemakers are too numerous to mention: some of the principal are William Gleason, F. Flipper, W. A. Hilton, Albright & Kircher, and Keltner & Rakestraw." Flipper was the subject of a poem in Scuppernongs and Other Vineyards by Winnett Turner Holt (1957). Festus, Isabella, and Henry Flipper are all buried at Old Magnolia Cemetery, a historic African-American burial ground in Thomasville, sometimes colloquially called the Flipper Cemetery.
- Isabella Burkhalter Flipper (1837–1887) – Born in Alabama or Georgia, Isabella had been enslaved by Rev. Reuben H. Luckey, a minister and educator who ran both a boarding house and the "female department" of the Fletcher Institute school of Thomas County, Georgia. According to a historian studying the Ponder House (Atlanta), Isabella Flipper "cooked for Union officers starting in the Spring of 1865, and later Isabella and Festus' home became the first restaurant in Atlanta open to the public after the war."
- Henry O. Flipper (1856–1940) - Civil engineer and history writer who was also the first black graduate of West Point and an officer of the Buffalo Soldiers
- Rev. J. S. Flipper (1859–1944) – Bishop, teacher, and president of Morris Brown College, the library at Allen University in Columbia, South Carolina is named in his honor.
- Festus Flipper Jr. (1868–1943) – Ran a shoe repair in Thomasville at 107 South Broad Street. His house in Thomasville was built in 1928 and still stands. The "front-gabled craftsman style cottage" at 430 Lester St is a stop on the Thomasville Black Heritage Trail. The cobbler's bench he used in his work is in the collection of the Thomas History Center.
- Emory H. Flipper, M.D. (1873–1951) – Graduated from Shaw University medical school in 1909. Dr. E. H. Flipper worked in private practice in Monticello, Florida, and Jacksonville, Florida. Flipper was one of 15 black physicians practicing in Jacksonville in 1942. Dr. Flipper was a member of the A.M.E. Church and the Odd Fellows fraternal organization. The house of E. H. Flipper was listed as a "tourist home" in Jacksonville in the Negro Traveler's Green Book for two years after his death.
- Dr. Carl F. Flipper (1875–1961) - Faculty at Georgia State Industrial College for Colored Youths, now known as Savannah State University. Flipper taught in shoe repairing and leatherwork in the trades and industries division. During the 1948 school year he co-taught six classes including three quarters of Elements of Shoe Repairing, and three quarters of Advanced Shoe Repair including "advanced work in repairs," "finishing with machines, et cetera," and "estimating cost and production work."

== Sources ==
- Dietrichs, John A. (December 2020). "The Ponder House: An Historic Nexus" (PDF). Battle Lines: Newsletter of the Civil War Round Table of Atlanta. 2020 (8). Atlanta, Georgia: Atlanta Civil War Round Table: 2–13 – via atlantacwrt.org & Atlanta History Center.
- Flipper, Henry Ossian (1878). The Colored Cadet at West Point. New York: H. Lee & Co. LCCN 15021526. OCLC 575940645. OL 25268718M.
- Garrett, Franklin M. (2010) [1954, 1969]. Atlanta and Environs: A Chronicle of Its People and Events. Vol. I: 1820s–1870s. Athens, Georgia: University of Georgia Press. doi:10.1353/book11991. ISBN 978-0-8203-3127-0. LCCN 54014260. OCLC 794702320.
- Rivers, Larry Eugene; Brown, Canter (2015). Mary Edwards Bryan: Her Early Life and Works. Gainesville: University Press of Florida. ISBN 9780813055565. Project MUSE book 41746.
- Rogers, W. Warren (1963). Ante-bellum Thomas County, 1825–1861. Florida State University studies no. 39. Tallahassee: Florida State University.
- Smith, Julia Floyd (2017) [1973]. Slavery and Plantation Growth in Antebellum Florida, 1821–1860 (PDF). Florida and the Caribbean Open Books Series (Digital reissue, cc-by-nc-sa ed.). Gainesville, Florida: LibraryPress@UF, an imprint of the University of Florida Press. ISBN 978-1-947372-63-4. LCCN 70150656. OCLC 488144. OL 5704889M.
