= Joseph Simeon Flipper =

American bishop and academic

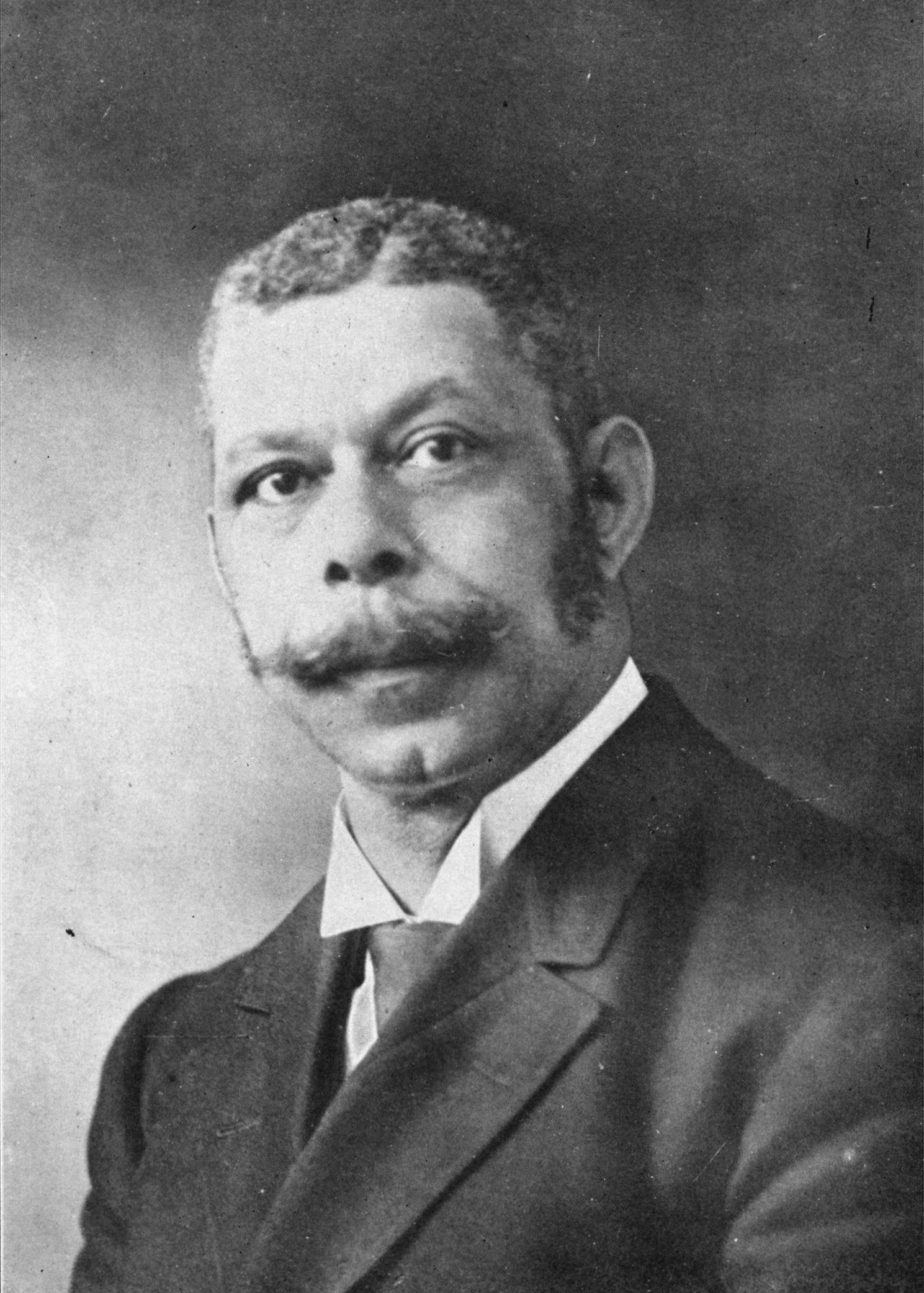
- Joseph Simeon Flipper circa 1919
- Born: February 22, 1859; Atlanta
- Died: October 9, 1944 (aged 85); Atlanta
- Occupation: Minister

Joseph Simeon Flipper (February 22, 1859 – October 9, 1944) was an American bishop and academic.

== Early life and education ==
Joseph Simeon Flipper was born on February 22, 1859, in Atlanta, Georgia, to Elizabeth (Burkhalter) and Festus Flipper. He was enslaved at birth on the plantation of Ephraim G. Ponder. He attended Atlanta University from 1869 to 1876, after which he taught school in Thomaston, Georgia. He studied theology for five years and was admitted to the ministry of the African Methodist Episcopal Church in January 1880. Flipper received a doctorate of divinity from Allen University in 1893.

== Career ==
His first pastorate was in Grooverville, Georgia. He was pastor of a church in Boston, Georgia, from 1881 to 1882, and in Darien, Georgia, from 1882 to 1883. He then taught for two years in Decatur County, and was then made minister of the Bethel Church at Atlanta, where he remained four years. From 1893 to 1896 he was the presiding elder for a district centered in Athens, Georgia, and held a position at Big Bethel AME Church in Athens. He then became pastor of the Allen Temple Church in Atlanta. He remained there until 1899, when he took a position at St. Paul's Church, also in Atlanta. He stayed at St. Paul's until 1903.

In 1904 he became dean of the department of theology at Morris Brown College. Shortly thereafter he became its president. He resigned as president in May 1908, after being elected and consecrated as a bishop on May 20, 1908. He was initially assigned to the ninth episcopal district, which included Arkansas and Oklahoma, and later held positions throughout the country, mainly in the South.

== Personal life ==
Flipper married Amanda Slater on February 24, 1880. They had three children. His brother was Henry Ossian Flipper, both were part of the notable Flipper family. He died on October 9, 1944, in Atlanta.

== See also ==
- Flipper family
