= Ponder =

Ponder can refer to:

== People ==
- Amos Lee Ponder (1887–1959), Justice of the Louisiana Supreme Court
- Bruce Ponder, Director of and Professor of Oncology at the Cancer Research UK Cambridge Research Institute
- Christian Ponder (born 1988), starting quarterback for the Minnesota Vikings football team
- Danielle Ponder, American singer and lawyer
- Elijah Ponder (born 2002), American football player
- Elmer Ponder (1893-1974), Major League Baseball pitcher
- James Ponder (1819–1897), an American merchant and politician
- Patricia Maxwell née Ponder (born 1942), American romance writer
- Samantha Ponder (born 1987), American sportscaster and wife of Christian Ponder
- William Thomas Ponder (1893-1947), American World War I flying ace
- William David Ponder (1855–1933), South Australian politician
- Winston Ponder (born c. 1944), Australian malacologist (studier of molluscs)

=== Group biographies ===
- Ponder brothers (William G. Ponder, Ephraim G. Ponder, James Ponder, and John G. Ponder), 19th-century American slave traders

== Other uses ==
- Ponder, Missouri, a ghost town
- Ponder, Texas, a town in the United States
- Ponder (horse), American Thoroughbred racehorse and 1949 Kentucky Derby winner
- Glen Ponder, a character in the UK comedy series Knowing Me, Knowing You
- Ponders End, Greater London, England
- Ponder Stibbons, a character from Terry Pratchett's Discworld series.
- Permanent brain (or "pondering"), the usage of the opponent's time for thinking in turn-based games
- "Ponder", a song by Knuckle Puck from their 2015 album Copacetic
