= Henry Ossian Flipper =

American soldier (1856–1940)

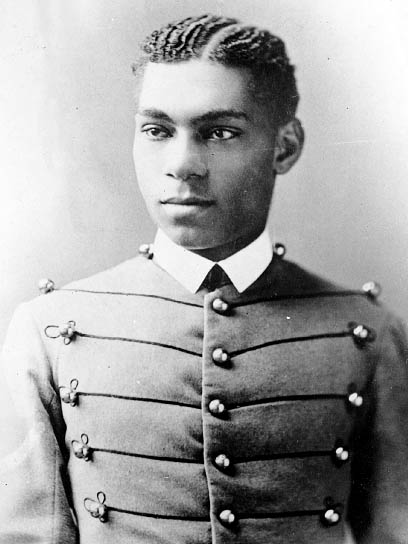
- Cadet Henry O. Flipper USMA Class of 1877
- Born: March 21, 1856; Thomasville, Georgia, U.S.
- Died: April 26, 1940 (aged 84); Atlanta, Georgia, U.S.
- Military career
- Allegiance: United States
- Branch: United States Army
- Service years: 1877–1882
- Rank: Second lieutenant
- Unit: 10th Cavalry Regiment
- Conflicts: Indian Wars
- Other work: Civil engineer

Henry Ossian Flipper (March 21, 1856 – April 26, 1940) was an American soldier, engineer, former slave and in 1877, the first African American to graduate from the United States Military Academy at West Point, earning a commission as a second lieutenant in the United States Army. He was also an author who wrote about scientific topics and his life experiences.

After his commissioning, he was assigned to one of the all-black regiments in the U.S. Army, which were historically led by white officers. Assigned to 'A' Troop under the command of Captain Nicholas M. Nolan, he became the first nonwhite officer to lead buffalo soldiers of the 10th Cavalry. Flipper served with competency and distinction during the Apache Wars and the Victorio Campaign, but was plagued by rumors alleging improprieties. Eventually, he was court-martialed and dismissed from the U.S. Army.

After losing his commission in the Army, Flipper worked throughout Mexico and Latin America as an assistant to the Secretary of the Interior. He retired to Atlanta in 1931 and died of natural causes in 1940.

In 1976, his descendants applied to the U.S. military for a review of Flipper's court-martial and dismissal. A review found the conviction and punishment were "unduly harsh and unjust" and ordered Flipper's dismissal be changed to a good conduct discharge. Shortly afterwards, an application for pardon was filed with the Secretary of the Army, which was forwarded to the Department of Justice. Eventually, President Bill Clinton posthumously pardoned Lieutenant Henry O. Flipper on February 19, 1999, 118 years after his conviction.

== Early life and education ==
Flipper was born into slavery in Thomasville, Georgia, the eldest of five brothers including Joseph Simeon. His mother, Isabelle Flipper, and his father, Festus Flipper, a shoemaker and carriage-trimmer, were owned by Ephraim G. Ponder, a wealthy slave trader.

Flipper attended Atlanta University during Reconstruction. There, as a freshman, he was appointed by Representative James C. Freeman to attend West Point, where four other black cadets were already attending. The small group had a difficult time at the academy, where they were rejected by white students. Nevertheless, Flipper persevered, and in 1877, became the first of the group to graduate, earning a commission as a second lieutenant in the U.S. Army cavalry. He was assigned to the 10th Cavalry Regiment, one of the four all-black "buffalo soldier" regiments in the Army, and became the first black officer to command regular troops in the U.S. Army (all-black regiments had been commanded by white officers).

== 10th Cavalry Regiment ==
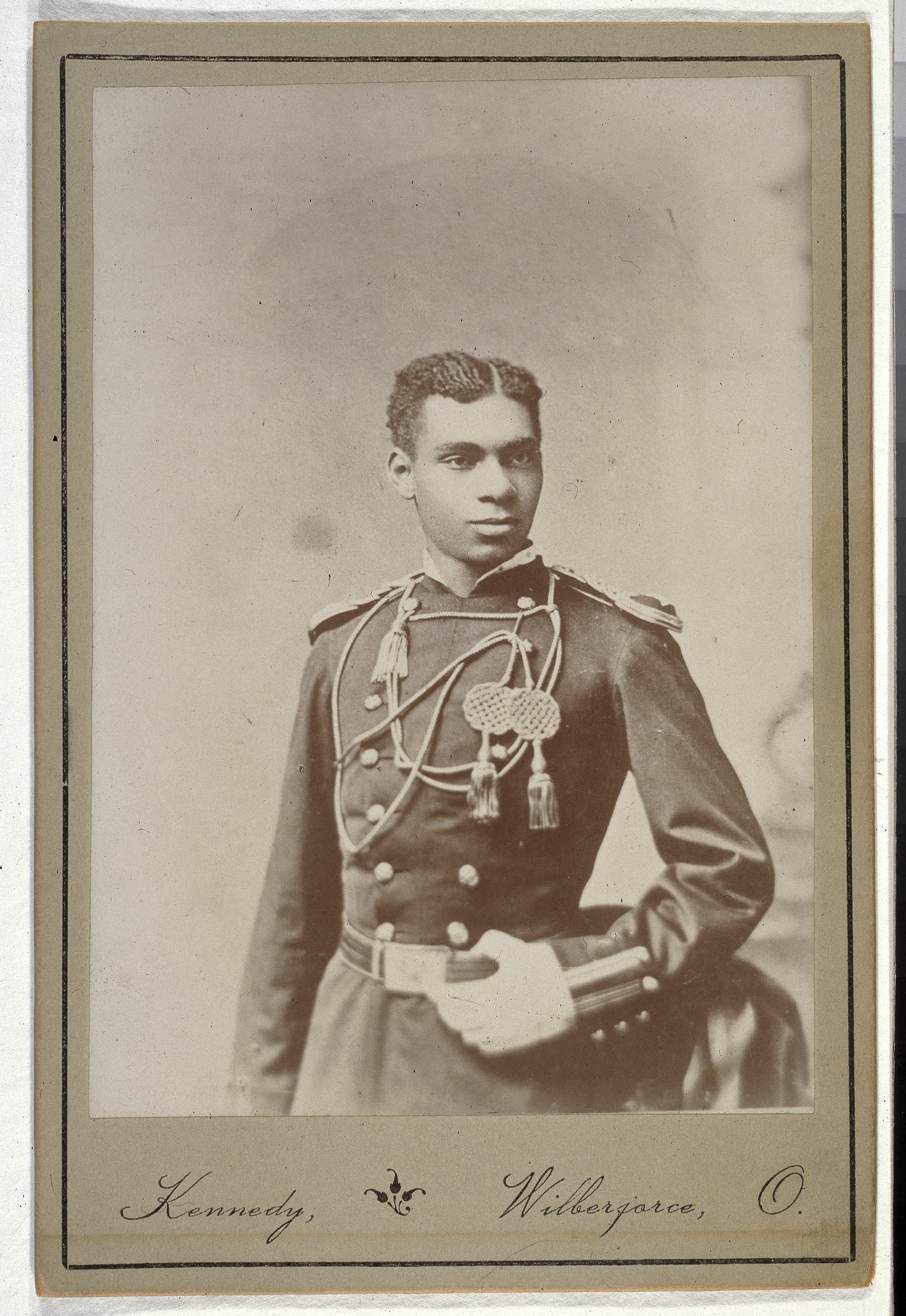
Photograph of Lt. Henry O. Flipper, circa 1877

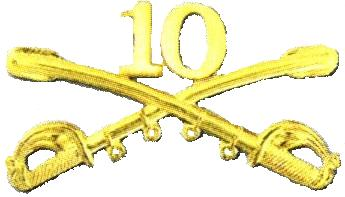
10th Regiment United States Cavalry insignia

In July 1877, Flipper reported to Fort Sill in the Indian Territory, for assignment with the Tenth U.S. Cavalry. But the Tenth was not at Fort Sill, they were at Fort Concho. He was assigned to "A Troop", and given many assignments including engineering a ditch to drain a swamp that was malaria-infested called "Flipper's Ditch" which is a National Historic Landmark. He supervised the construction of roads and telegraph lines from Fort Elliot to Fort Sill and again to Gainesville, Texas. He was the first nonwhite officer to lead buffalo soldiers in battle.

Captain Nicholas M. Nolan, the commander of 'A' troop, was the officer assigned to teach him about being a cavalry officer. Nolan was censured by several white officers for allowing Flipper into his quarters for dinner, where his daughter Kate was present. Nolan defended his action by stating that Flipper was an "officer and a gentleman" just like any other officer present.

In August 1878, Captain Nolan married his second wife, Anne Eleanor Dwyer, in San Antonio, Texas. They had one child, a girl. Anne's sister, Miss Mollie Dwyer, arrived shortly after Troop A moved to Fort Elliott in Texas in early 1879. Mollie Dwyer and Flipper became friends and often went riding together. Nolan was the de facto commander of Fort Elliott and he made Flipper his adjutant. Flipper received high marks from his commander. However, rumors and letters hinted at improprieties against Flipper, an African American and Dwyer, a Caucasian. During the next many months, he sent and received letters from Mollie.

In June 1880, Flipper received orders to report to Fort Concho in West Texas where he served as a scout for Col. Benjamin H. Grierson in the Victorio Campaign. Flipper and Nolan reunited during the Victorio Campaign. It was the last time the two met. Throughout this period, his military career was encumbered by racism in the military, though he did have the support of some officers, such as Nolan, and many of the white civilians he encountered who were impressed by his competency. In November 1880, Flipper was transferred to Fort Davis in West Texas and assigned as the post quartermaster and commissary officer.

== Court-martial and discharge ==
Colonel William Rufus Shafter assumed command at Fort Davis in March 1881. He had been the commander of the First Infantry Regiment at Fort Davis. Shafter had a reputation of bullying subordinates. Then Shafter ordered Flipper to keep the quartermaster's safe in his quarters. . In July 1881, Flipper found a shortage of over $2,000.00 (equivalent to $66,724 in 2025). Realizing this could be used against him by officers intent on forcing him out of the army, he attempted to hide the discrepancy, which was later discovered, and then lied about it when confronted. In August, he was arrested by Shafter for embezzling government funds. Word quickly spread about the missing money. The community came up with the money to replace what was missing within four days. Shafter accepted the money, then convened a court-martial on 17 September 1881.

In December 1881, the court-martial found Flipper innocent of the main charge due to lack of evidence, but another charge was added during the trial, and he was found guilty of conduct unbecoming an officer and gentleman, and sentenced to be dismissed from the service of the United States. In two prior situations involving white officers who had been found guilty of embezzlement, neither officer was dismissed nor dishonored. The letters exchanged between Mollie Dwyer (Nolan's sister-in-law) and Flipper were used against Flipper. Relationships between whites and blacks were strictly forbidden in the viewpoint of the white officers on the board. Despite appeals, and with the denial of a lighter sentence from President Chester A. Arthur, Flipper was drummed out of the army with a dismissal, the officer equivalent of a dishonorable discharge, on 30 June 1882. For the rest of his life, Flipper contested the charges and fought to regain his commission.

== After the military ==
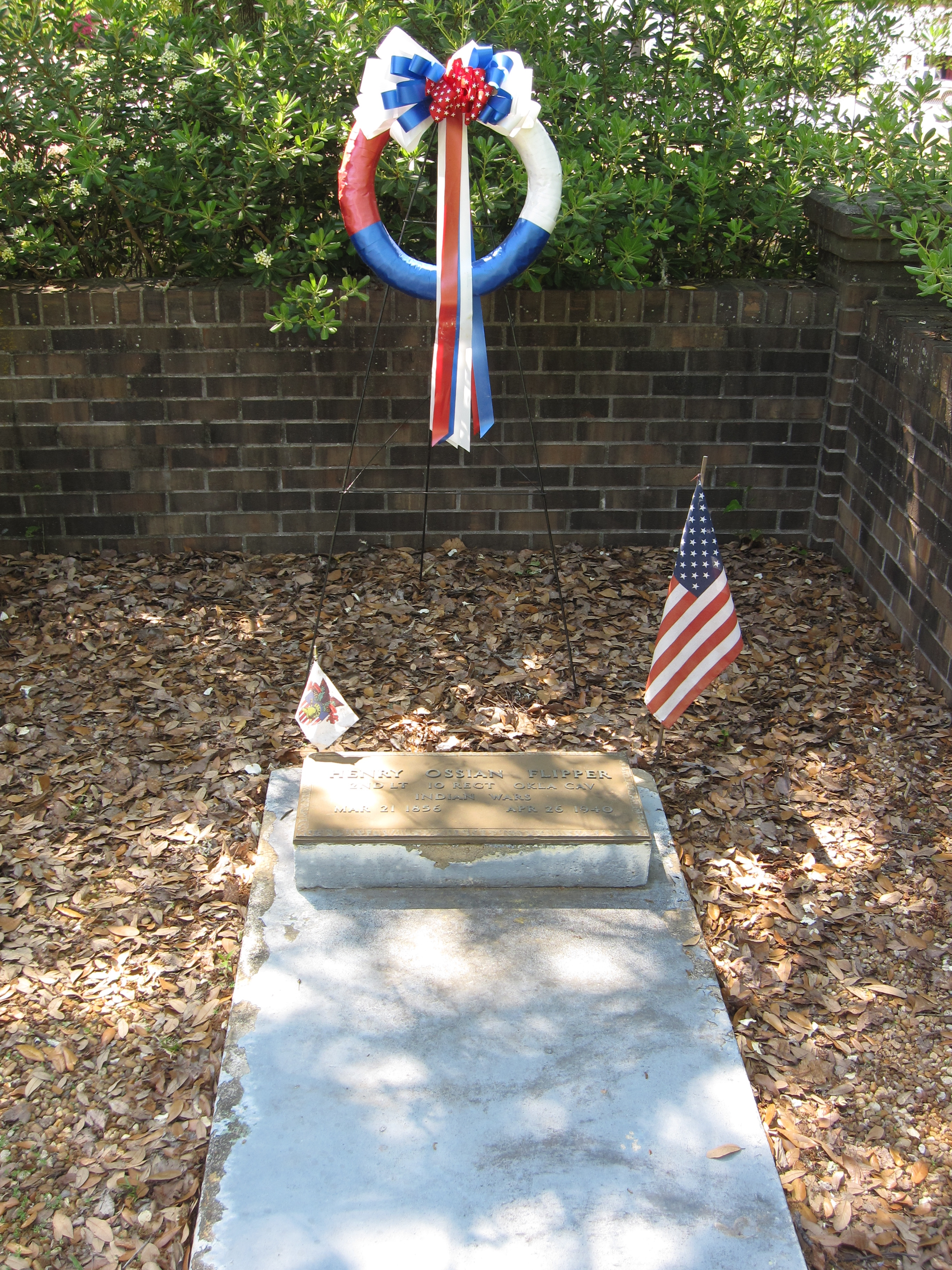
Flipper's grave in Thomasville, Georgia

After his dismissal, Flipper remained in Texas, working as a civil engineer in El Paso. In 1898, he volunteered to serve in the Spanish–American War, but requests to restore his commission were ignored by Congress. Flipper spent time in Mexico where, according to folklorist J. Frank Dobie, he attempted to discover the location of the legendary lost silver mine of Tayopa. Upon returning to the United States, he served as an adviser to Senator Albert Fall on Mexican politics. When Senator Fall became Secretary of the Interior in 1921, he brought Flipper with him to Washington, D.C., to serve as his assistant.

In 1923, Flipper went to work in Venezuela as an engineer in the petroleum industry. He retired to Atlanta in 1931, and died in 1940. He was buried in the family plot at South-View Cemetery, but in February 1978 he was exhumed and reburied in his home town of Thomasville.

== Legacy ==
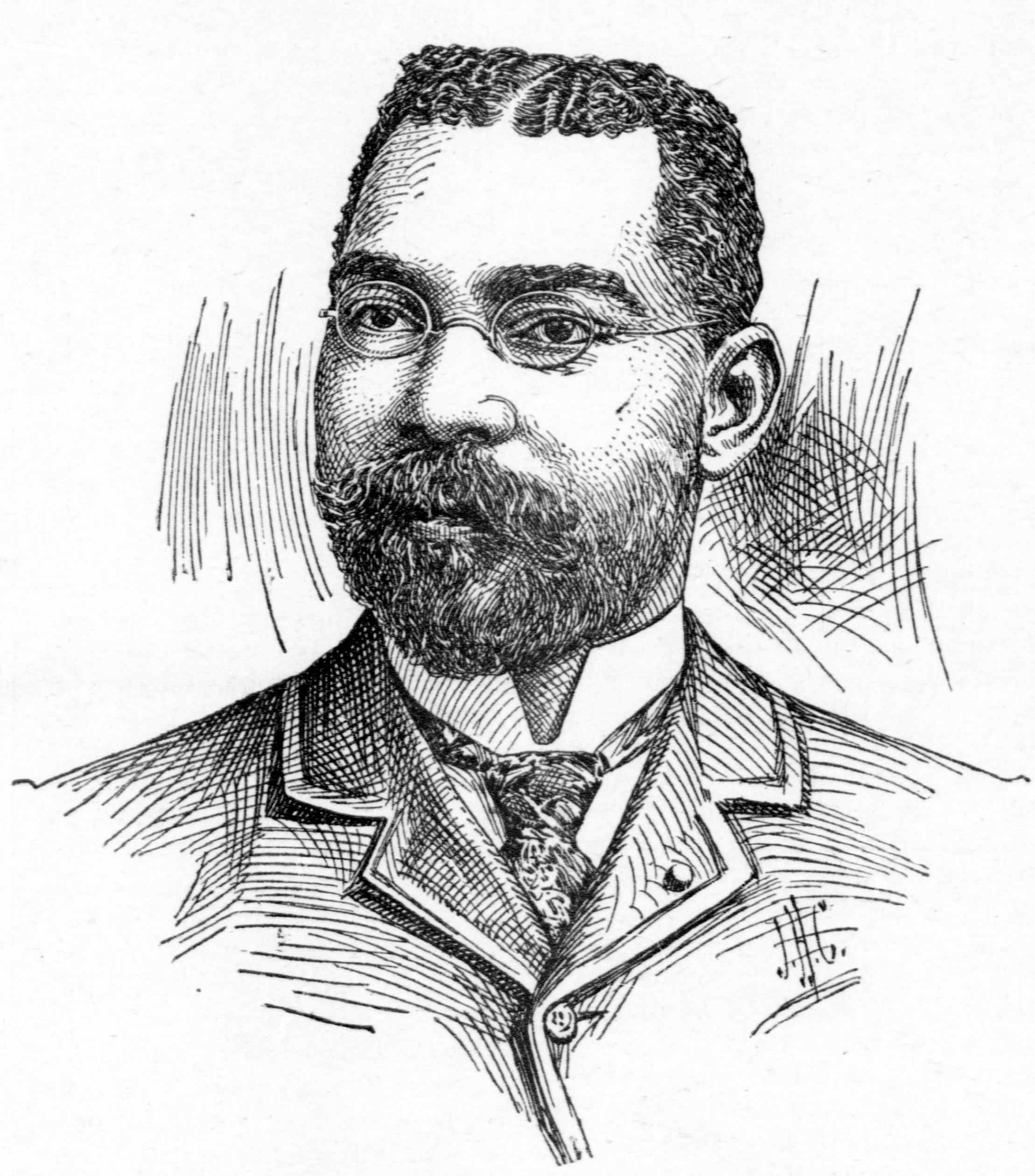
circa 1900

In 1976, descendants and supporters applied to the Army Board for the Correction of Military Records on behalf of Flipper. The board, after stating it did not have the authority to overturn his court-martial conviction, concluded the conviction and punishment were "unduly harsh and unjust" and recommended that Flipper's dismissal be changed to a good conduct discharge. The Assistant Secretary of the Army (Manpower and Reserve Affairs) and the Adjutant General approved the board's findings, conclusions, and recommendations, and directed the Department of the Army to issue Flipper a Certificate of Honorable Discharge, dated 30 June 30, 1882, in lieu of his dismissal on the same date. On October 21, 1997, a private law firm, Arnold & Porter, filed an application of pardon with the Secretary of the Army on Flipper's behalf. Many pardon applications had been rejected in the past – as a matter of policy – because the intended recipients were deceased. However, President Bill Clinton pardoned Flipper on February 19, 1999.

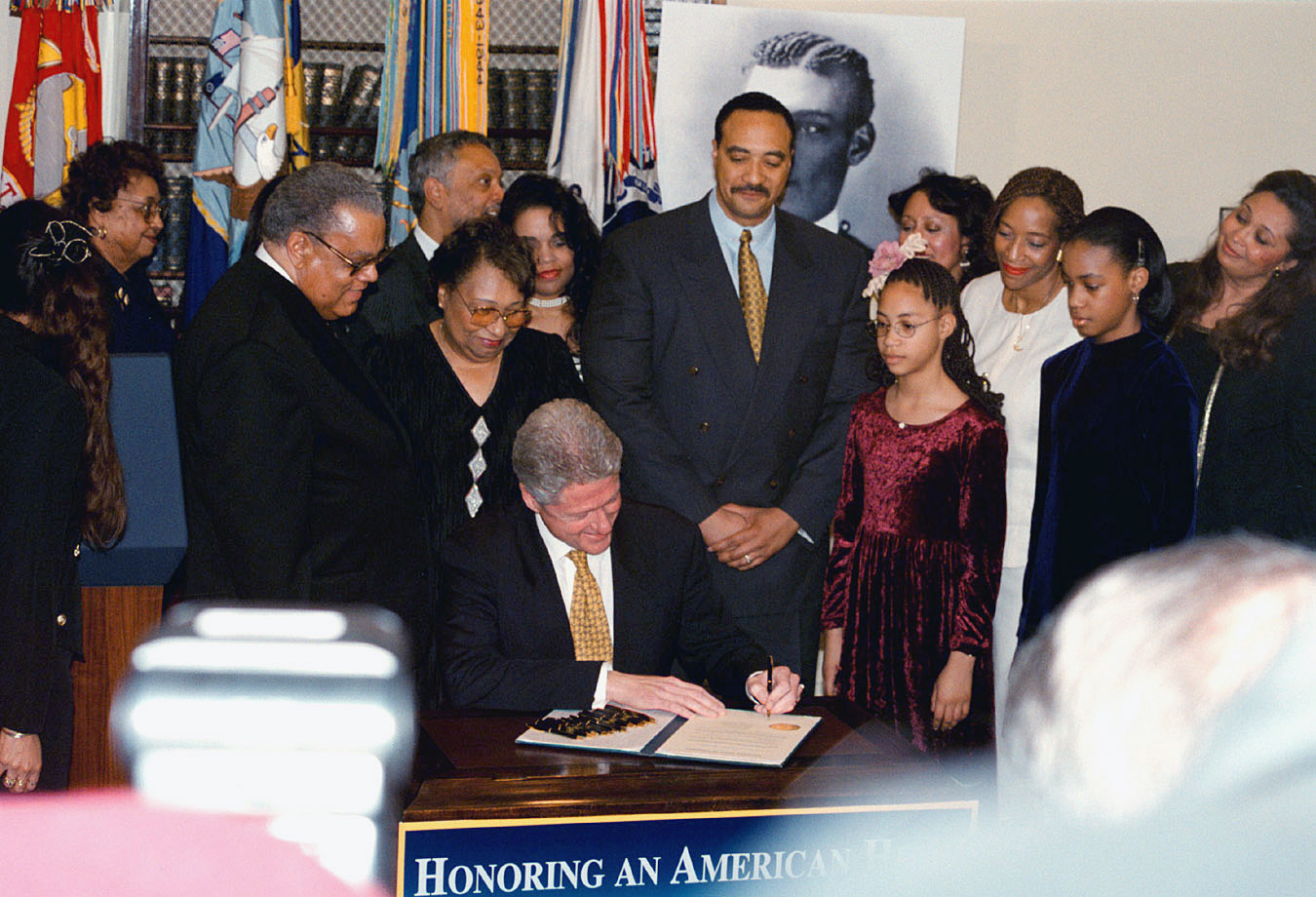
President Clinton pardons Flipper, February 19, 1999

After his discharge was changed, a bust of Flipper was unveiled at West Point. Since then, an annual Henry O. Flipper Award has been granted to graduating cadets at the academy who exhibit "leadership, self-discipline, and perseverance in the face of unusual difficulties."

Throughout his life, Flipper was a prolific author, writing about scientific topics, the history of the Southwest, and his own experiences. In The Colored Cadet at West Point (1878) he describes his experiences at the military academy. In the posthumous Negro Frontiersman: The Western Memoirs of Henry O. Flipper (1963), he describes his life in Texas and Arizona after his discharge from the Army.

== See also ==
- Flipper family
- James Webster Smith, first black cadet at West Point
- Johnson Chesnut Whittaker (1858–1931), one of the first black men to win an appointment to the United States Military Academy at West Point
- List of African-American firsts
- List of African-American pioneers in desegregation of higher education
- List of people pardoned by Bill Clinton
- Dreyfus affair
