= W. G. Ponder Plantation =

Cotton plantation in Florida, USA

Coordinates: 30.6181°N 84.0718°W

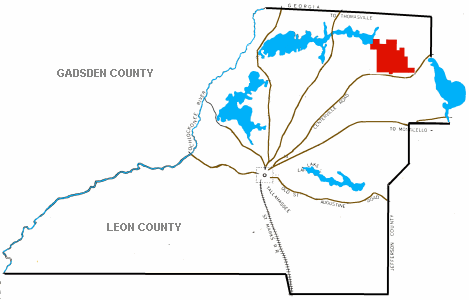
Location of the William G. Ponder Plantation

The William G. Ponder Plantation was a large forced-labor farm growing cotton on over 5,756 acres (2,329 ha) in northeastern Leon County, Florida, United States. It was named after the planter who established it.

== Location ==
The plantation was located west of the settlement of Miccosukee and not bordering any other plantations. Today that land encompasses private property north of Moccasin Gap Road and Veteran's Memorial Drive.

== Plantation statistics ==
The Leon County Florida 1860 Agricultural Census shows that the William G. Ponder Plantation had the following:

- Improved Land: 1,000 acres (400 ha)
- Unimproved Land: 4,000 acres (1,600 ha)
- Cash value of plantation: $48,000
- Cash value of farm implements/machinery: $1500
- Cash value of farm animals: $6,125
- Number of slaves: 99
- Bushels of corn: 8,500
- Bales of cotton: 206

== The owner ==
W. G. Ponder was one of two absentee planters in northeast Leon County. Originally from Thomas County, Georgia, Ponder began purchasing land in Leon County in 1846.

Agents for William Ponder.

- B. Regan
- Jno. J. Courtney

== The 1900s ==
In 1913, the W.G. Ponder Plantation grounds were purchased by Lewis S. Thompson of Red Bank, New Jersey renaming it Sunny Hill Plantation.
