= Pounds (surname) =

Pounds is a surname, and may refer to

- Adam Pounds (born 1954), British composer and conductor
- Bill Pounds (1878–1936), American baseball pitcher
- Brian Pounds, American singer-songwriter
- Caroline Pounds (fl. 1840–1880), Irish watercolour artist
- Courtice Pounds (1861–1927), English singer and actor
- Dana Pounds, American track and field athlete
- Darryl Pounds (born 1972), American football player
- Diego Pounds (born 2002), American football player
- Jessie Brown Pounds, (1861–1921), American lyricist of gospel songs
- John Pounds (1766–1839), English teacher and Ragged school pioneer
- Ken Pounds (born 1934), British physicist
- Lewis H. Pounds (1860–1947), American businessman and politician
- Louie Pounds (1872–1970), English singer and actress
- Nekima Levy-Pounds, now Nekima Levy Armstrong (born c. 1976), American lawyer and activist
- Norman Pounds (1912–2006), English geographer and historian
- Quinten Pounds (born 1996), American football wide receiver
- Pia Pounds, Ugandan singer-songwriter
- Sarah Pounds, American politician
- William F. Pounds (1928–2023), American academic

== See also ==
- Pound (surname)
