= Harry Pond =

English footballer

Personal information
- Full name: Andrew Alfred Percy
- Date of birth: 19 April 1917
- Place of birth: Kilnhurst, England
- Date of death: 1990 (aged 72–73)
- Position: Left half

Senior career*
| Years | Team | Apps | (Gls) |
| –1938 | Barnsley | 0 | (0) |
| 1938–1939 | Carlisle United | 11 | (0) |
| 1946–1948 | Boston United | 35 | (3) |
- * Club domestic league appearances and goals

Harold Pond (19 April 1917 – 1990) was an English professional footballer who played in the Football League for Carlisle United as a left half.

== Personal life ==
Pond worked at the Folland Aircraft factory in Hampshire during the Second World War.

== Career statistics ==
Appearances and goals by club, season and competition
| Club | Season | League | | | National cup (Note: Includes FA Cup) | | Other | | Total | |
| Club | Season | Division | Apps | Goals | Apps | Goals | Apps | Goals | Apps | Goals |
|---|---|---|---|---|---|---|---|---|---|---|
| Boston United | 1946–47 | Midland League | 32 | 3 | 3 | 0 | 3 (Note: 1 appearance in Lincolnshire Senior Cup, 1 appearance in Mather Cup, 1 appearance in Boston Hospital Cup) | 0 | 38 | 3 |
| Boston United | 1947–48 | Midland League | 3 | 0 | 0 | 0 | 0 | 0 | 3 | 0 |
| Career total | | | 35 | 3 | 3 | 0 | 3 | 0 | 41 | 3 |
