= Ponder, Missouri =

Extinct town in Ripley County, Missouri

Coordinates: 36°35′02″N 90°59′20″W

Ponder is an extinct town in southwestern Ripley County, in the U.S. state of Missouri. The GNIS classifies it as a populated place. The community is located on Missouri Route 142 between Doniphan to the east and Gatewood to the west. Fourche Creek passes just east of the site.

A post office called Ponder was established in 1888, and remained in operation until 1957. The community has the name of Pleasant John Ponder, the original owner of the town site.
