= Ephraim Ponder House =

Historic house in Georgia, United States

- U.S. National Register of Historic Places
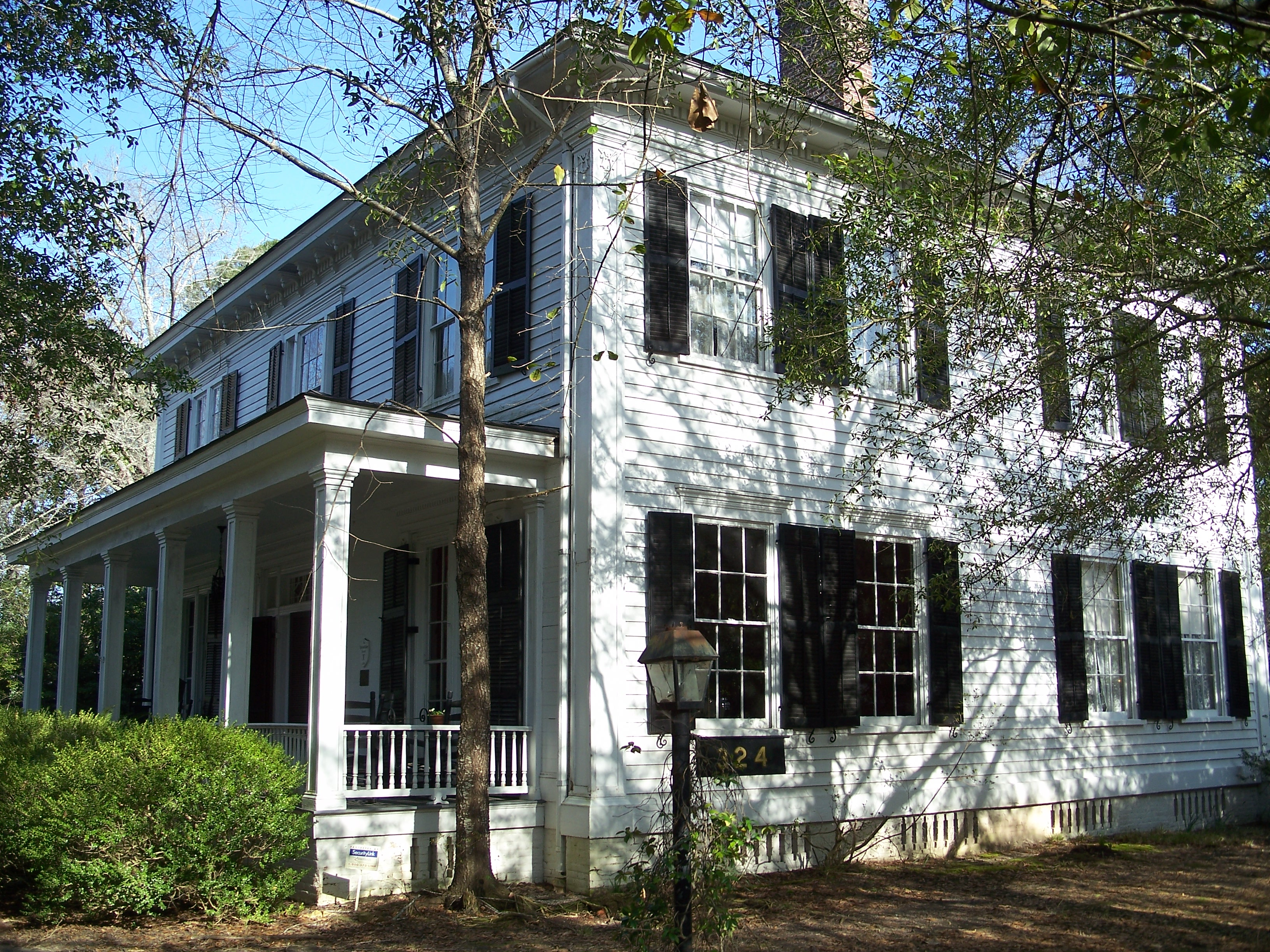

- Location within Georgia Location within the United States
- Location: 324 N. Dawson St., Thomasville, Georgia
- Coordinates: 30.838611°N 83.982222°W
- Area: 0.5 acres (0.20 ha)
- Built: c.1854-56
- NRHP reference No.: 70000223
- Added to NRHP: August 12, 1970

The Ephraim Ponder House in Thomasville, Georgia, also known as the Sholar House, was built c.1854-56 It was listed on the National Register of Historic Places in 1970.

It was built by slave trader Ephraim Ponder, and served part of old Young's Female College in Thomasville in 1869 and latterly as home of the president of the old College. At the time of NRHP listing it was owned by John Sholar and wife.

Its south facade is Greek Revival in style and faces the former Female College property.
