= Ponder brothers =

19th-century American slave traders

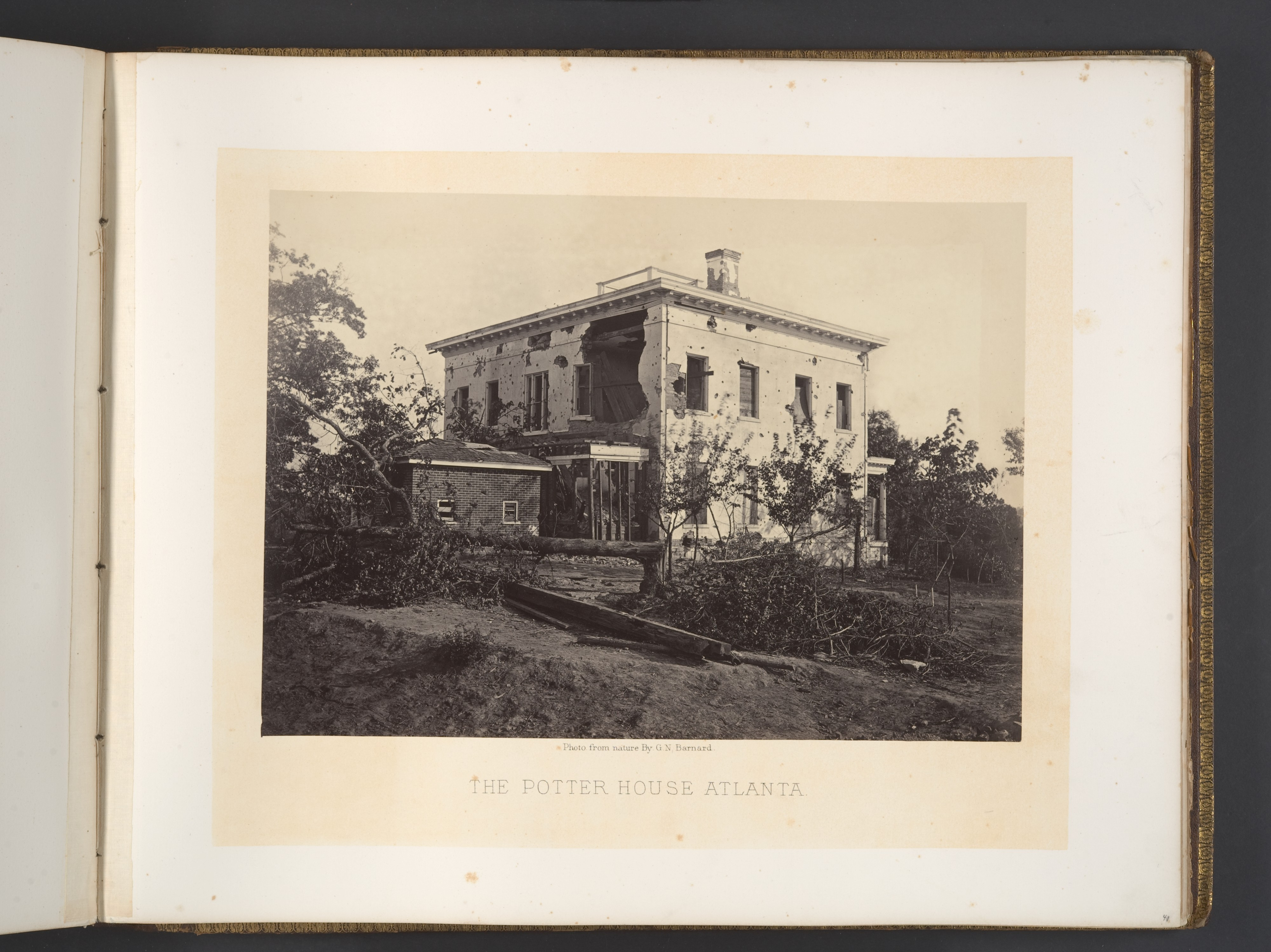
"The Potter House" by George N. Barnard published as plate 38 in his 1866 photograph album Views of Sherman's Campaign (MET_1970.525)

The Ponder brothers were four siblings who worked as interstate slave traders in the United States prior to the American Civil War, trafficking people between Maryland, Virginia, Georgia, and the Florida Territory. William G. Ponder was a Georgia state senator and delegate to the 1861 Georgia secession convention. The shops and house of Ephraim G. Ponder in Atlanta, Georgia, were heavily shelled during the Atlanta campaign of the American Civil War; a photograph of the damaged building was widely published as "the Potter House." James Ponder seems to have supervised industrial and agricultural enterprises in Thomas County, Georgia that used slave labor. John G. Ponder was murdered in 1849 while trafficking a group of slaves overland from Richmond, Virginia to Georgia.

== Ponders overview ==
The Thomasville History Center of Thomas County, Georgia has a collection of letters from Ephraim Ponder to W. G. Ponder, providing updates on the slave-trading business and other news:

- October 15, 1848: Ephraim and John Ponder were together in Richmond buying slaves. They had already bought 17 slaves, including one shoemaker "for James" who cost $250, and they hoped to buy another. However, "the Virginians" would not sell at a discount. Ephraim reported that John Ponder wanted to head back south. E. Ponder shared election news and stated that Virginia would definitely go Democratic.
- January 14, 1849: Ephraim Ponder, writing from Richmond, acknowledged receipt of $729.65 from William G. Ponder. He reported that prices for "good men" ranged from $650 to $690, the prices for female slaves typically ranged from $500 to $575, and that prices for enslaved mothers with children were "high." Ponder encouraged William to do what he can to help John along, and wrote, "I don't think of trading any longer than this year. I shall make my arrangements to quit next spring 1850."
- October 14, 1849: "Our negro market is brisk," wrote Ephraim Ponder, providing a list of current prices at the Richmond, Virginia slave market:

Richmond slave market prices, fall 1849
Category	Price range
No. 1 men	$825 to $850
No. 1 women	$600 to $700
Plow boys 5 ft 2 inches	$650 to $675
Girls 4 ft 4 inches	$425 to $450
Girls 4 ft 6 inches	$475
Girls 4 ft 8 inches	$500
Good women with one child	$650 to $700

Ephraim Ponder also wrote to William G. Ponder, "I have not heard from John since he got in Georgia. I am ancious to hear from him. I am in hopes that John will be able to sell the lot of negroes well for I can lay in the same negroes with $4,000 more." A week later, on October 21, 1849, John G. Ponder, the youngest of the four brothers, was ax murdered. Ponder, while escorting a coffle of 60 slaves from Virginia to Florida, was evidently killed in his sleep by highwaymen who stole a coat and $50.

There are several references to an undifferentiated "Ponder" in primary sources for American slavery. In 1835 two men in Dallas County, Alabama placed a runaway slave ad seeking the return of 24-year-old Sophy, "dark complexion, near six feet high, small in the waist for her size, full face and small eyes—had a small set of ear-rings in her ears, and wore a brass comb in her hair—took several suits of clothing with her, and may change her dress frequently. She is a very good seamstress, and was purchased from a trader by the name of Ponder, residing in Florida. Ponder brought her from Virginia not long since." A family reunification advertisement placed in 1882 sought information about Mansfield Crutchfield who had been sold when he was about 13 years old by "Oscar Crutchfield to a slave-trader named Ponder about 1845 at Richmond, Va.; was supposed to have been seen during the war on a Mississippi steamboat. Any information as to his whereabouts will be thankfully received by his aged mother. Address LOUISE CAW, Knoxville, Tenn." In Henrico County, Virginia in 1846, there was a lawsuit over the ownership of 28 slaves that named Mr. Hagan (possibly John Hagan), Mr. Omohundro (possibly Silas Omohundro), Mr. Christian, Mr. Barksdale, Mr. Stanard, and Mr. Ponder as parties to the conflict.

Note: It was technically illegal to import slaves into Georgia from 1788 until the law was repealed in 1856, but there was no law prohibiting the sale of slaves just across the border in the lands of the Cherokee Nation in what became the northwest quadrant of the state after Indian Removal, or across the Savannah River in Hamburg, South Carolina, maybe across the Chattahoochee River from Columbus in Alabama, or perhaps in Tallahassee.

== William G. Ponder ==
William G. Ponder
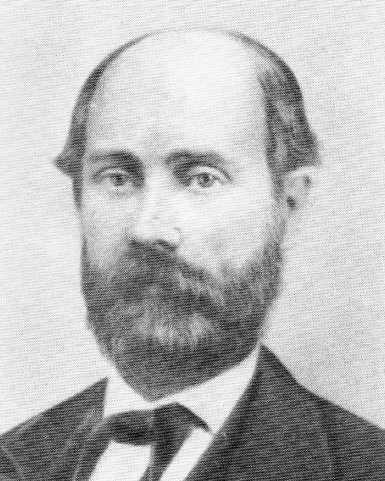
- W. G. Ponder, c. 1860
- Born: October 23, 1803
- Died: December 26, 1867 (aged 64)

William Graham Ponder (October 23, 1803 – December 26, 1867) was in Florida at an early day. He was married to Elizabeth Copland in Leon County in 1829. He served as an election inspector for Leon County in the Florida Territory in 1829 and 1831, and was a justice of the peace in 1832 and 1840. In 1829 he signed a petition requesting a further subdivision of Leon County. In 1837 Ponder petitioned the Leon County Superior Court that "William Ponder states that Robert S. Miller died before repaying $1,350 that he borrowed from Ponder. As part of the loan agreement, Miller delivered the slaves Phillis and Sarah to Ponder as collateral. Now Ponder asks the court to foreclose on the mortgaged property and to bar Robert H. Berry and William Brodie, administrators of the Miller estate, as well as any other persons, from seeking 'their rights or equity of redemption in the said mortgaged property.'" The petition was granted."

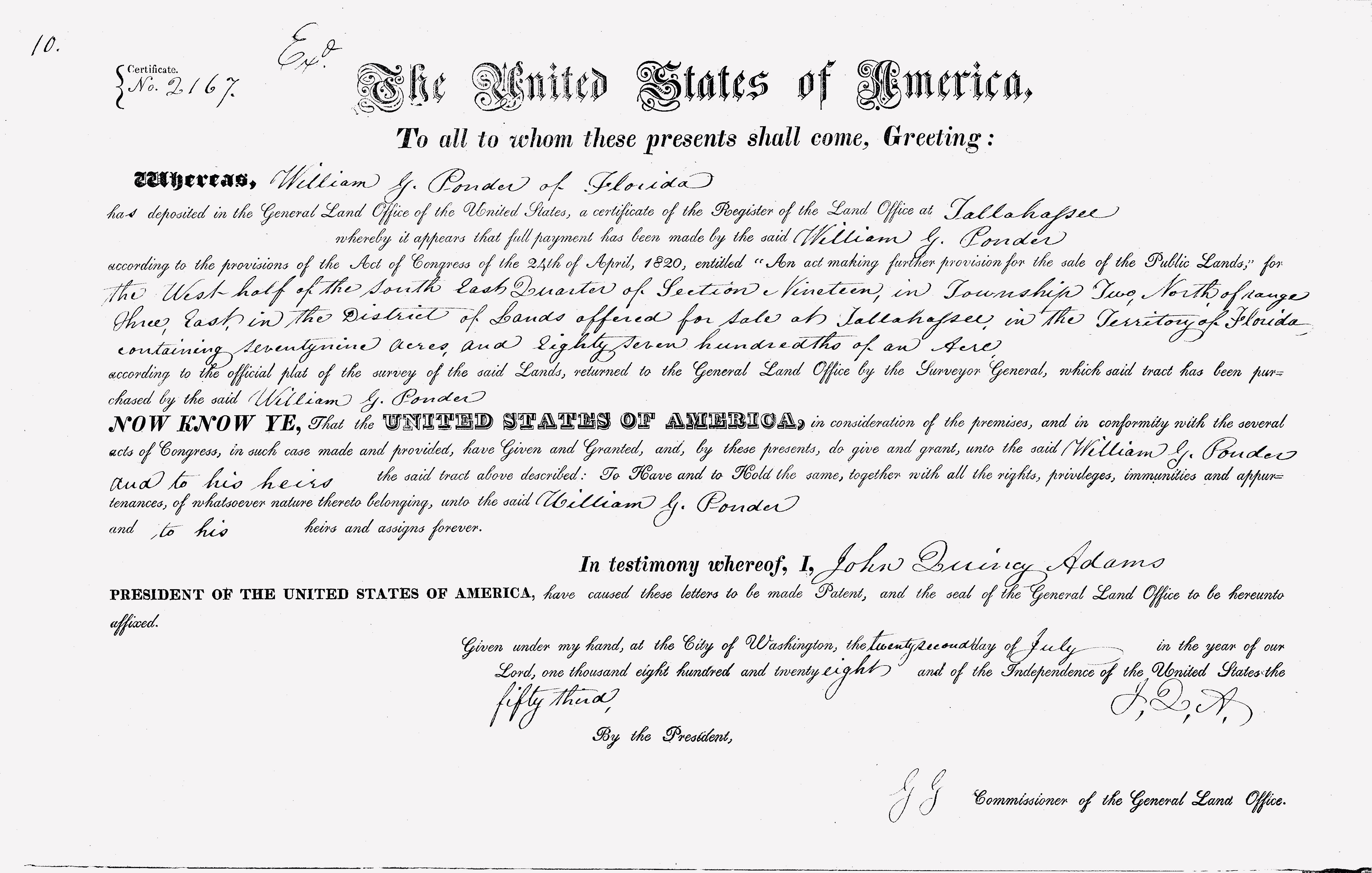
U.S. government grant of land in Florida to William G. Ponder, 1828

In 1845 Ponder was present in the sale of the Parkhill estate slaves, Tom Gandy, Harriet, Mary Ann and Wm. Washington, Sam Cormick, Primus, Sarah, George Edmondson, George Lewis, Daniel, William Eppes, Matilda Ann, Sarah and Maria, Julia, Anthony, Molly, Patsey, Hannah, Israel, Sarah and Harriet Ann, Kealan, Jacob, York, Melinda, Squire, Queen and Eliza Ann, Rhoda, Jack, Billy, Moses, Martha, Lucinda and William, Fenton and Helina, Frank, Francis, Isaac, Richard, Juba, Toney, Becky, Jinny, Cuffy, Phillis, Chloe, Dolly, Sam, Elizabeth, Rachael, Adeline, Jane, Polly, John Robinson, Monachy, Elizabeth, Eddy, Bob, George, Maria Miles, Mary, Frederick, William Pryer, Louisa, William, Christina, Horace, Judy Linsey, Susan, Charley Johnny, Mary Long, Joe, Ephraim, Ellen, Cornelia, Rachael, Jack Morgan, Mary, Toney, Sibby, William, Toney, Scipio, Peggy, Isaac, Lucy, York, Grace, Rose, Abram, James, Jones, George, York Jr., Caroline, Morgianna, Fanny, Phoebe, James, Juba, James, Mary Page, Margaret, Frank, Margaret, Albert, Anderson, Pleasant, Edmund, David, William, Cæsar, Amy, Dick, Phillis, Richard, Israel, Ellick, Esther, Amy, Albert, Old Jack, Margaret, Homady, Pittman, Cary, James, Old Tom, Frederick Clark, Nancy Burney, John, Anna, Susan, Maria, Giles, Fanny, Martha, Ned, Francis, Barbary, Kitty Ann, Wilson, Nancy, Ben, Hercules, Hanly, Eliza, Jacob, Winney, Emily, Tom Hackley, Diana, Ellen, Amelia, Betsy Ann, Dick, Lisbon, Katy, Cyrus, Henry, Taylor, Mary Thomas, Louisa, Clarissa, Elizabeth, Anthony, Ben, Sam, Nancy Pool, Walker, Maria, Amy, Maria, Penny Davidson, George, Phil, Betty, Nelson, Selva, Matilda, Sarah Ann, Amelia, Wakala, Virginia, and Charity, at a sale near Tallahassee, Florida Territory. Ponder bought Caroline for $535, and in a separate transaction bought Juba, Jane, Frank, Margaret, Albert, Anderson, and Pleasant, for $1500. Additionally, "It was agreed and considered as admitted that one of the slaves purchased by Ponder applied to the plaintiff Moseley before the sale to purchase her, because she had a husband owned by Ponder, who resided in the neighborhood; Moseley said he was unable to purchase, and recommended the slave to apply to Ponder to purchase her. Accordingly the slave went over to Ponder's place, and afterwards Ponder came to the Court House, and after the conversation alluded to by Ponder in his testimony in Camp's case, the negro was bid off by Ponder." According to the case summary, a witness testified, "Knows Juba and Caroline, two of the slaves named in Ponder's bill of sale but not their present value. Cannot state the value of the hire of the slaves. Juba, for an old woman, was a good hand, and was worth from forty to seventy dollars per year; Caroline about eighty dollars, the price fluctuating and generally low. A female slave of thirteen years would hire for about thirty dollars; a girl of eleven and a boy of ten would be worth about their victuals and clothes...Thinks the slaves altogether, and those bought by defendant, sold high, and for as much as they would have brought since." A witness named John G. Gamble testified under cross examination, "In the year 1834 the witness borrowed money from Ponder to unable [sic] him to go to Europe to negotiate the bonds of the Territory of Florida. This was before the Bank went into operation. Did not then or since explain the nature of the charter of the Union Bank to the defendant." The decision of the court in was that "We are therefore of opinion that the circuit court erred in the instructions under consideration. That the judgments and executions under which the slaves were sold were not void. That they gave a sufficient authority for the sale, and that the right of property in these slaves passed by the sale to the defendant or appellant, William G. Ponder."

Map of the state of Georgia c. 1830

Ponder was one of the organizers and board members of the Fletcher Institute school that was established in Thomas County in 1848, which had two brick buildings and served both male and female students. In 1849, he sold twenty-seven bales of cotton for US$1,700 (equivalent to $65,790 in 2025) to Tallahassee shopkeeper James Martin Williams. Ponder was one of a group of civic boosters examining the prospects for building a plank road between Thomasville and New Port, Florida. He was on a committee to plan a new county courthouse building. William G. Ponder was elected to the Georgia State Senate for the 1855–56 session as a member of the Democratic Party. In 1856 he was a commissioner for the planning-stage Atlantic and Gulf Railroad.

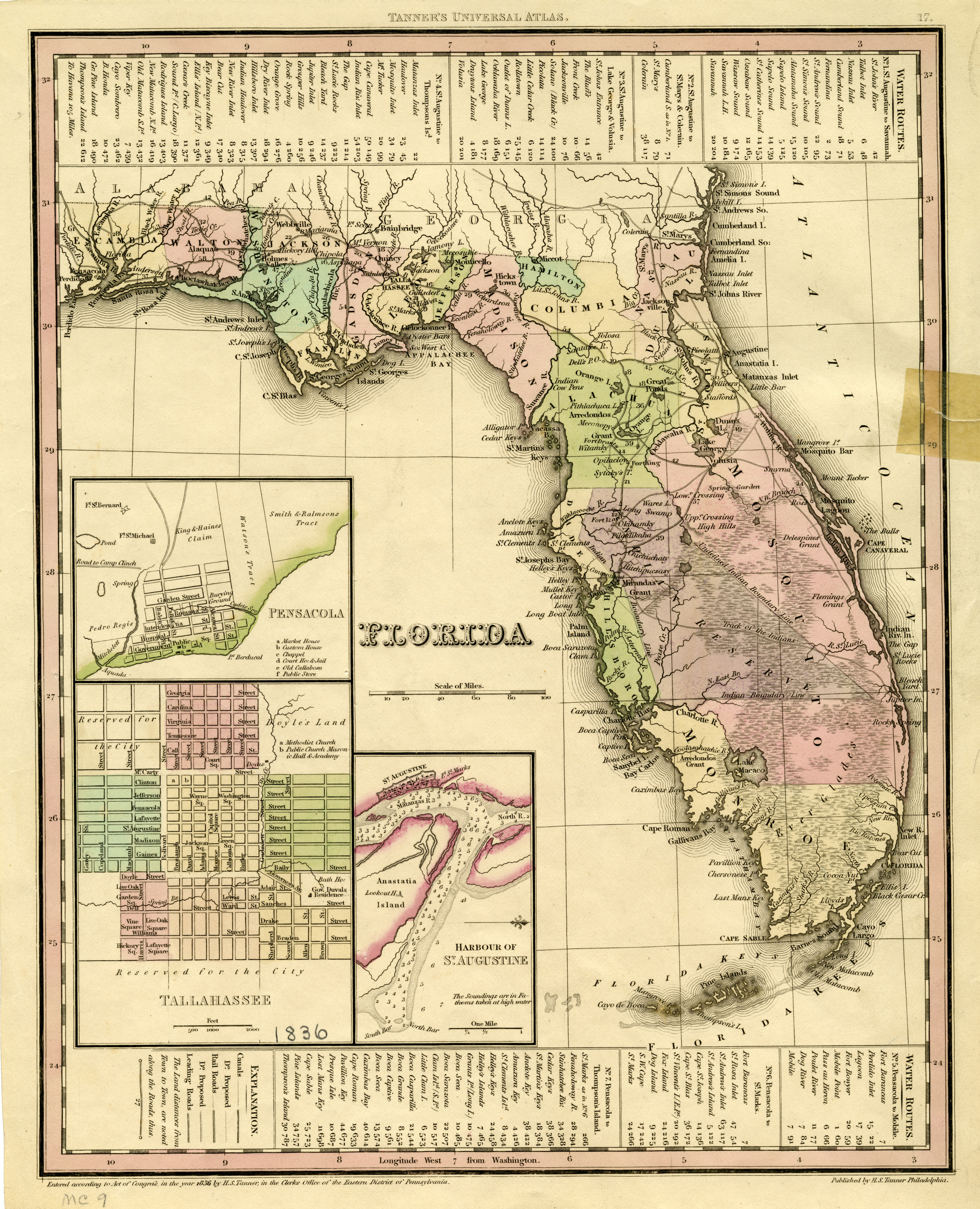
1833 map of Florida Territory from Henry S. Tanner's American atlas

Ponder is the namesake of the W. G. Ponder Plantation and owned a large number of slaves in Leon County, Florida in 1860. In 1861 Ponder was one of three delegates selected in a January 2, 1861, election to represent Thomas County to the state secession convention. One paper described him as a "cooperationist" on the issue of secession; a 1963 history of Thomas County described Ponder as supporting "immediate secession...but only as a last resort" camp, but as one who was not an "unreasoning extremist" but voted for secession because "there was no turning back" and because "we are indisputably bound up with the cotton states which lie on all sides of us." Ponder ultimately voted in support of the secession ordinance and signed the declaration.

Later in 1861 Ponder contributed to a fund supporting the Ochlocknee Light Infantry and Thomasville Guards of the Confederate States Army. In August he was one of three Thomas County delegates to the convention to select the first Confederate governor of Georgia. In 1863 the Confederate Army requisitioned Ponder's hogs and promised to pay $45 per animal.

Notice of his death appeared in the New Orleans Times-Picayune in January 1868, with the note that the Thomasville Enterprise described him as "one of the oldest and best" citizens of Thomas County.

== Ephraim G. Ponder ==
Ephraim G. Ponder
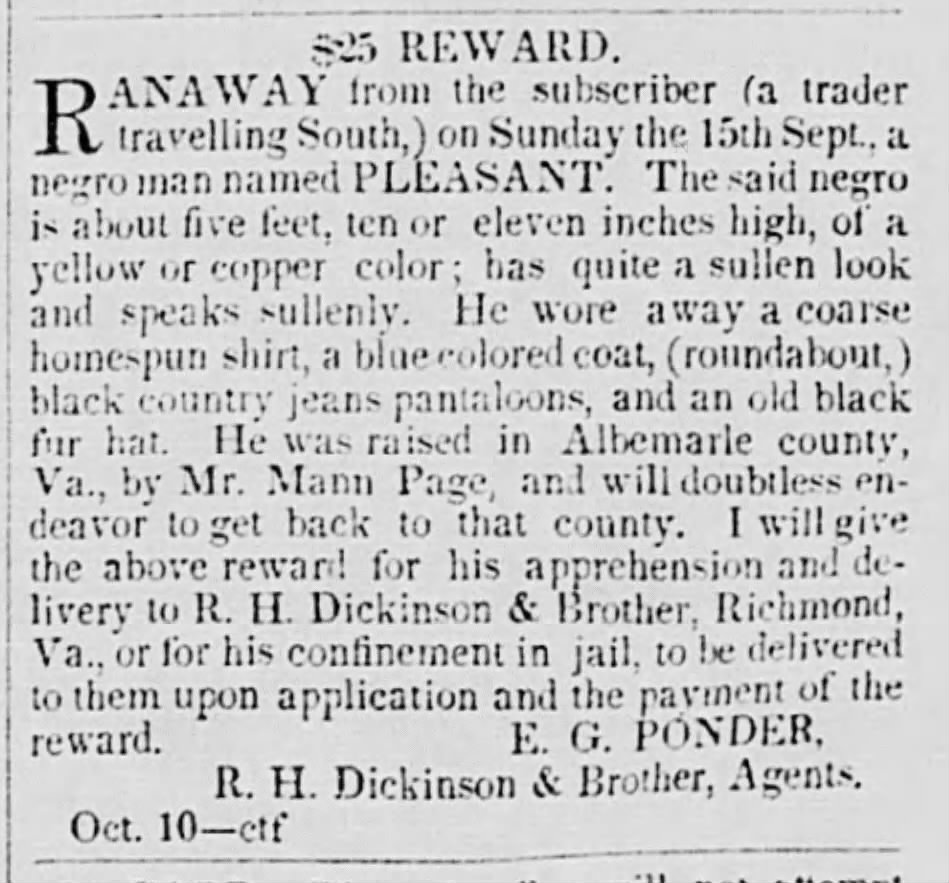
- Pleasant, a native of Albemarle County, Virginia escaped from Ponder, "a trader traveling south," in September 1844
- Born: November 17, 1808
- Died: August 19, 1874 (aged 65)

Ephraim Graham Ponder (November 17, 1808 – August 19, 1874) was a 19th-century American slave trader based in Georgia. His house in Atlanta was destroyed by artillery during the American Civil War. His house in Thomasville, Georgia, is on the National Register of Historic Places.

Ponder was enumerated as a resident of Leon County, Florida in the 1840 U.S. census and his household included one male slave. Two case summaries in the Digital Library of American Slavery Race and Slavery Petitions database hosted by the University of North Carolina, Greensboro Libraries, involve Ephraim G. Ponder. First, in 1841 in Leon County, "James Trotti asked that Ephraim Ponder be enjoined from further action against him with regards to his note for the purchase of the slave Clinton. Trotti explains that he bought two slaves, Henry and Clinton, from Ponder for $2500. Trotti charges that Clinton was of an unsound mind and body, often suffering fits of an 'aggravated character' that rendered him a liability. Trotti asks that Ponder 'be decreed to credit thereon the price of said Clinton.'" Among the related documents in the file was an advertisement placed by Leigh Read on February 6, 1841, two months before he was killed for killing the assassin's brother in a duel. Second, there was eight-year-long lawsuit in Barbour County, Alabama involving Ponder: "In 1842, Miles M. Johnson of Florida, and Cornelius J. M. Andrews and Elizabeth Johnson, executor and executrix of the will of the late Isham Johnson of Barbour County, Alabama, obtained a judgment of more than five thousand dollars against William Wyatt and William H. Wyatt in the Superior Court of Leon County, Florida. To avoid paying the debt, the Wyatts arranged for Ephraim Ponder to move a number of slaves to Alabama, where he sold some for cash and some through notes issued in his name. The slaves were worth about six thousand dollars. The plaintiffs sue the Wyatts, Ponder, and lawyers hired to collect on the notes, charging fraud, and winning a judgment in excess of eight thousand dollars. The lawyers, however, were not found culpable." In 1844 Ponder offered a $25 reward for Pleasant, who escaped from a drove he was escorting southward from Richmond, stating "The said negro is about five feet, ten or eleven inches high, of a yellow or copper color; has quite a sullen look and speaks sullenly. He wore away a coarse homespun shirt, a blue colored coat, (roundabout,) black country jeans pantaloons, and an old black fur hat. He was raised in Albemarle county, Va., by Mr. Mann Page [possibly a son of Mann Page], and will doubtless endeavor to get back to that county. I will give the above reward for his apprehension and delivery to R. H. Dickinson & Brother, Richmond, Va., or for his confinement in jail." In 1851 a white man "who gave his name as George Williams" was arrested for trafficking a possibly abducted or "stolen" unidentified slave girl who had been dressed as a boy at one point and told to say her name was John. Williams was arrested after trying to sell her "under suspicious circumstances" in or around "a disreputable house on Cary street, occupied by Martha Stevenson" and when accosted by police was trying to sell her to E. G. Ponder "of this city." In 1858, Ephraim Ponder and James Ponder were both implicated in having trafficked, in 1837, Giles Price, a free black man from Baltimore who had been convicted of theft and then bought by James Ponder and sold to Ephraim Ponder in Alexandria, Virginia (which was Alexandria, District of Columbia in 1837).

Prior to his marriage, Ponder lived on a plantation that "straddled the Florida and Georgia state lines, in Leon County, Florida, and Camden County, Georgia." E. G. Ponder served on the Thomas County grand jury in 1855. In 1856 he was elected to serve as an alderman (city councilmember) for Thomasville, Georgia. Sometime between 1854 and 1856 he paid for the construction of a "handsome Georgian house" in Thomasville that has been called one of the town's "architectural gems." Researchers believe the Ephraim Ponder House was commissioned as a home for Ponder and his new bride and eventually their children, Ponder "having lived to this point on his plantation." The designers and builders included an "exceptional" Greek Revival-style entrance, and the "entire first floor of this façade is flush siding, with clapboards above...The notable interior includes rift pine floors, excellent millwork, door and window crowns, and ceiling medallions." Rift floors, a speciality of the Wiregrass, were "tongue and groove floorboard that is milled with the grain as tight and straight as possible...using virgin longleaf pine."

"Confederate palisades and chevaux-de-frise near Potter house"; Confederate sharpshooters were placed inside the brick house, and the siding of the outbuildings was stripped for defensive works and/or firewood (George Barnard, LOC_cwpb.03416)

In 1859 Ponder was party to the Georgia Supreme Court case, Ponder v. Cox, 28 Ga. 305. He moved to the burgeoning settlement of Atlanta, Georgia sometime between 1855 and 1860. In 1861 he was on the grand jury for Fulton County. Historian Franklin M. Garrett devoted three pages to Ephraim Ponder's time in Atlanta in his history of the city, originally published in 1954. Recently married and already wealthy from slave trading and owning plantations, Ponder and his young wife Ellen B. Gregory Ponder moved to Atlanta, where he purchased "about 25 acres of land," or, more specifically, "on November 25, 1857, Ponder purchased from J. J. 'Cousin John' Thrasher 26-35/100 acres of Land Lot No. 81 in the 14th District for $1,460.48. This property lay along Marietta Road and the W. & A. R. R., 1 1/2 miles from the center of the city. It is now traversed by Ponder Avenue, Northwest, named for Ponder, and by numerous contiguous streets." Ponder's house, along with a place called the Terraces on Pryor Street, was considered one of the "finest in and around ante-bellum Atlanta," and was surrounded by "a number of substantial frame buildings for his slaves, and three large buildings for manufacturing purposes, along the Marietta Road." According to Garrett, Ponder's slaves were granted an unusual degree of independence, as "The latter buildings housed the mechanical activities of the Ponder slaves. Of a total of 65, nearly all of the men were mechanics. All, except the necessary household servants, a gardener and a coachman, were permitted to hire their own time. Mr. Ponder would have absolutely nothing to do with their business other than to protect them. Therefore, if anyone desired an article of their manufacture, they contracted directly with the workman and paid him his own price. These slaves were virtually free. They acquired and accumulated a modest substance and, except for complete freedom and education, lived happily and usefully." Henry Ossian Flipper, U.S. Army (retired), wrote about Ponder's business interests in a 1936 letter written to the Pittsburgh Courier:

John F. Quarles was the slave of Ephraim G. Ponder, as also was the present writer. Mr. Ponder had established in Atlanta in 1857 a factory where he manufactured buggies, carriages, wagons, carts, stage coaches, plows and boots and shoes, gathering the best Negro mechanics he could from various places in the South, the writer's father being brought from Fredericksburg, Virginia, as carriage trimmer and boot and shoemaker. Mr. Quarles was one of Mr. Ponder's wheelwrights. In all probability, there is not a Negro wheelwright in all the country today. In those days, they were skilled workmen, doing all this work by hand. To make a buggy wheel, for instance, was no light job, as they had to make the hub, the spokes and the felloes[?] by hand. In after years, due to Yankee ingenuity, these could be bought, machine-made, in almost any hardware store.

However, despite the commercial success of Ponder's business, his personal life was apparently somewhat less satisfactory. He filed for divorce (and left town) in October 1861, charging that "Ellen Ponder had committed adultery as long ago as 1854 with 'divers' men; that she was a continual drunkard; had threatened her husband with a pistol; had used abusive language and treated him with the utmost disrespect." Ponder claimed that his wife had been cheating on him since 1854, although he had not been certain of her infidelity "until March 10, 1861." At the time of filing, Ponder's enslaved property was worth US$45,000 (equivalent to $1,612,500 in 2025) and his Atlanta real estate was worth US$10,000 (equivalent to $358,333 in 2025). Ellen Ponder remained in the Atlanta house until 1864 (when she fled the approaching U.S. Army for Macon, then to Fort Valley, leaving Festus Flipper to maintain the estate and the business). During the intervening time, according to Henry Flipper, "The mistress of this fortunate household, far from discharging the duties and functions of her station, left them unnoticed, and devoted her whole attention to illegitimate pleasures. The outraged husband appointed a guardian and returned broken-hearted to the bosom of his own family, and devoted himself till death to agricultural pursuits." Flipper recounts that the mechanics attached to the Ponder estate hired out their time on their own authority and then paid a portion of the earnings to Mrs. Ponder. Mrs. Ponder would frequently threaten to sell south to the especially perilous Red River country slaves with whom she was frustrated, but the pending divorce meant that she could not. The couple were so separate that the Atlanta party to the marriage was known as the Widow Ponder.

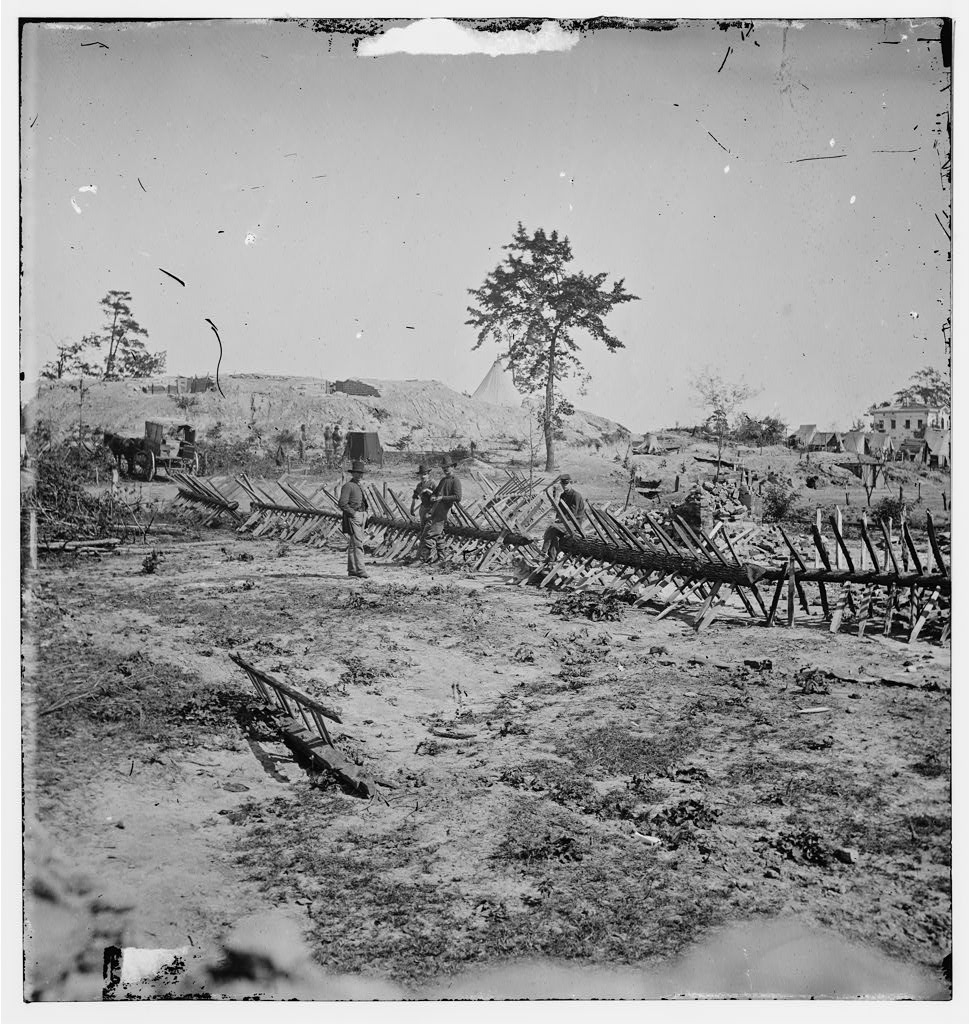
Fort X (aka Fort Hood) on the left, George Barnard's wagon and traveling darkroom in the center, Ponder House on the right

As the U.S. Army began to push into Confederate Georgia, with the expected casualties from the associated battles, in the spring of 1864 the Ponder estate buildings were turned in a 200-bed infirmary for soldiers. During the Atlanta campaign, the area around the Ponder House was defended by Confederate troops under the command of Edward C. Walthall, who built elaborate trench and wooden spike defenses in order to halt any infantry or cavalry push through the ground and then east to the Marietta road. According to the Atlanta History Center, "Confederate soldiers overlooked Ponder House...beginning in July [1864], the Ponder House became a target for Union batteries encamped near the corner of 8th Street and Howell Mill Road." This battery was commanded by John W. Geary and the house was hit with shells for over a month, as the Ponder House "stood between it and Atlanta." According to one history, "More than a ton of shells [were] found in the house following the siege."

After the war, Ponder's former slave Festus Flipper Sr. "conducted for many years a boot and shoe shop at 42 Decatur Street." Ponder himself was a resident of Thomasville at the time of the 1870 census, living alone, occupation "general tradesman," value of real estate $1,500. The divorce was granted in 1871, and the property sold and subdivided. Ponder died in 1874 and is buried at Laurel Hill Cemetery in Thomasville. Ponder's Thomasville house later served as the home of the president of Young's Female College. The former Ponder estate in Atlanta was located close what is now the campus of Georgia Tech. According to the Atlanta Journal-Constitution, the Ponder House specifically was in the vicinity of Tech Parkway near Means Street. Atlanta's still-extant Ponder Avenue takes its name from the larger estate and mechanical-industrial works that Ephraim Ponder established there in the half-decade before the American Civil War.

== James Ponder ==
James Ponder
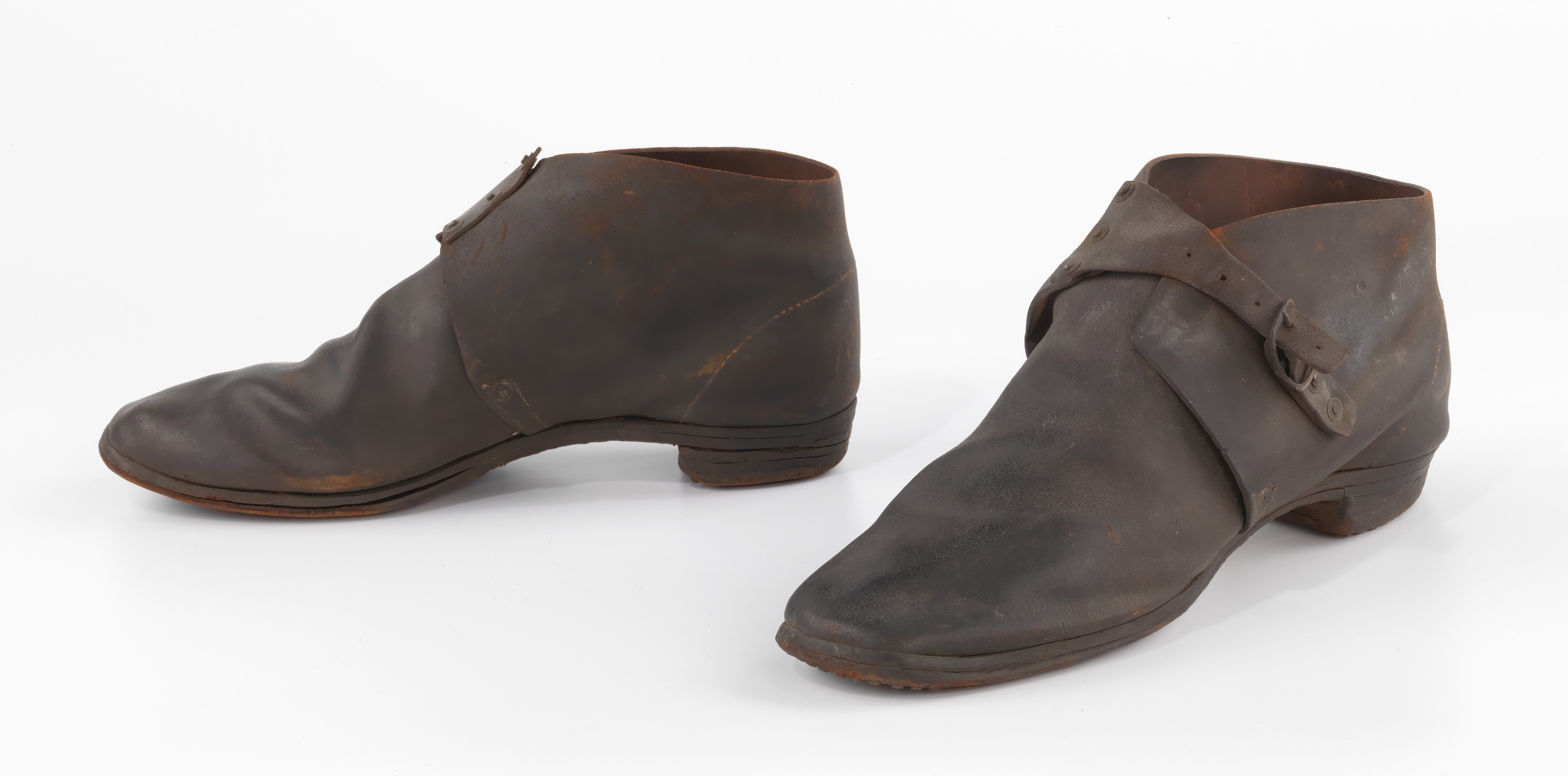
- Brogans made c. 1860, from the Costume Collection at the Metropolitan Museum of Art; "negro shoes" were alternately referred to as brogans, or plantation shoes. True plantation shoes might not have had metal buckles, but perhaps been tightened with laces made from hemp, jute, or leather.
- Born: April 3, 1818
- Died: October 19, 1851 (aged 33)

James Ponder (April 3, 1818 – October 19, 1851) was a Georgia-based slave trader. According to a news account published in 1858, in 1837, Giles Price, a free black man from Baltimore who had been convicted of theft was purchased by James Ponder and sold to Ephraim Ponder in Alexandria, Virginia (which was Alexandria, District of Columbia). In 1848, Ephraim Ponder wrote William Ponder that he purchased a shoemaker for $250 "for James" and hoped to buy another before they drove south with the purchased slaves. In summer 1851 Ponder advertised in the Florida Sentinel that he would have 2,000 "negro shoes" delivered for sale by October. At the time of his death, Ponder was the legal owner of Festus Flipper Sr., father of U.S. Army officer Henry Ossian Flipper and Methodist bishop Rev. J. S. Flipper. Ponder's estate sold Flipper, described as a "Negro bootmaker," at auction for US$1,810 (equivalent to $62,542 in 2025), while "Ponder's other slaves 'sold reasonably high.'" In 1853, Ponder's widow Ann M. Ponder transferred land in Thomas County and Leon County to Henry M. Copeland. She was Ponder's sole legatee. William G. Ponderand Ephriam G. Ponder were executors of their brother's estate.

== John G. Ponder ==
John G. Ponder
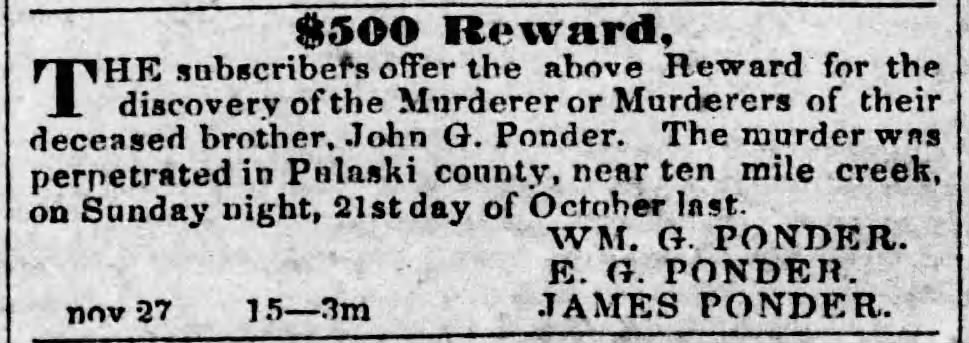
- Born: John Graham Ponder; May 18, 1824
- Died: October 21, 1849 (aged 25)

John G. Ponder (May 18, 1824 – October 21, 1849) was a 19th-century American slave trader based on Thomas County, Georgia, along the far southern border of the state, adjacent to Florida. He was killed at about 3 a.m. on Sunday, October 21, 1849, in Pulaski County, Georgia, at a campsite near Ten Mile Creek about 10–13 mi (16–21 km) below Hawkinsville "on the road to Cedar Hill (Slade's)." Ten Mile, now called Tenmile Creek, is a tributary of the Ocmulgee River. Ponder was killed while trafficking about 60 enslaved people from the Richmond, Virginia slave market to Florida where they were to be resold to cotton plantation owners. According to primary surviving account, the only witness was one of the women in the drove of slaves being sold south. Her account was elsewhere characterized as "no evidence but circumstantial and negro tales."

During Sunday night two men were seen by a negro girl; she supposing they were some of their own people, as the fire had burnt down and could not distinctly see them, she paid no attention to them. They killed him by a blow with an axe, which the girl heard. His head was completely split open, and he never spoke or made the least noise after the blow. They carried his trunk off half a mile and broke it open and got 50 dollars, we believe, and a cloth coat—his paper money was under his head and they did not find it. It is not thought that his negroes committed the murder, as they show no signs of guilt. The Coroner has taken charge of the body, and every effort will be made to ferret out and bring to justice the guilty perpetrators of the deed.

The Georgia Masonic Journal published an obituary for Ponder. Brothers of the St. Thomas Lodge No. 49 of Thomasville, Georgia, were to wear a mourning badge in his honor for 30 days.

== See also ==
- Plantations of Leon County, Florida
- Means Street Historic District
- Flipper family
- Jesse Kirby and John Kirby
- List of Florida and Georgia slave traders

== Sources ==
- n.a. (August 12, 1970). "Sholar House (Epraim Ponder House)". National Register of Historic Places Inventory - Nomination Form. U.S. Department of the Interior. NHRP No. 70000223.
- Dietrichs, John A. (December 2020). "The Ponder House: An Historic Nexus" (PDF). Battle Lines: Newsletter of the Civil War Round Table of Atlanta. 2020 (8). Atlanta, Georgia: Atlanta Civil War Round Table: 2–13 – via atlantacwrt.org & Atlanta History Center.
- Flipper, Henry Ossian (1878). The Colored Cadet at West Point. New York: H. Lee & Co. LCCN 15021526. OCLC 575940645. OL 25268718M.
- Garrett, Franklin M. (2010) [1954, 1969]. Atlanta and Environs: A Chronicle of Its People and Events. Vol. I: 1820s–1870s. Athens, Georgia: University of Georgia Press. doi:10.1353/book11991. ISBN 978-0-8203-3127-0. LCCN 54014260. OCLC 794702320.
- Hess, Earl J. (2018). Fighting for Atlanta: Tactics, Terrain, and Trenches in the Civil War. Civil War America. Chapel Hill: The University of North Carolina Press. ISBN 978-1-4696-4342-7. OCLC 1055763371.
- Johnson, Michael P. (1972). "A New Look at the Popular Vote For Delegates to the Georgia Secession Convention". The Georgia Historical Quarterly. 56 (2): 259–275. ISSN 0016-8297. JSTOR 40579775.
- MacIntyre, W. Irwin (1923). History of Thomas County, Georgia: from the time of De Soto to the civil war. Thomasville, Georgia.
- Paisley, Clifton (October 1971). "Tallahassee through the Storebooks, 1843–1863: Antebellum Cotton Prosperity". The Florida Historical Quarterly. 50 (2): 111–127. ISSN 0015-4113. JSTOR 30140651.
- Rogers, W. Warren (1963). Ante-bellum Thomas County, 1825–1861. Florida State University studies no. 39. Tallahassee: Florida State University.
- Smith, Julia Floyd (2017) [1973]. Slavery and Plantation Growth in Antebellum Florida, 1821–1860 (PDF). Florida and the Caribbean Open Books Series (Digital reissue, cc-by-nc-sa ed.). Gainesville, Florida: LibraryPress@UF, an imprint of the University of Florida Press. ISBN 978-1-947372-63-4. LCCN 70150656. OCLC 488144. OL 5704889M.
