= Pont (surname) =

Pont is a surname. Notable people with the surname include:

- Charles E. Pont, American artist
- John Pont, American college football coach
- Mike Pont, singer
- Mónica Pont, Spanish long-distance runner
- Raul Pont, Brazilian historian and politician
- Robert Pont, 16th century Scottish reformer
- Timothy Pont, Scottish mapmaker of the late 16th century

== See also ==
- Dupont (surname), people named Dupont, DuPont, duPont, Du Pont, or du Pont
