= Alfred Pond =

American politician

Member of the Michigan House of Representatives from the Genesee County district
- In office January 4, 1847 – March 17, 1847

Personal details
- Born: February 10, 1806 Clarence, New York, US
- Died: July 29, 1887 (aged 81) Genesee County, Michigan, US
- Party: Democratic
- Spouse: Elvira

Alfred Pond (February 10, 1806 – July 29, 1887) was a Michigan politician.

== Early life ==
Pond was born in Clarence, New York, on February 10, 1806. He moved to Michigan in 1839, where he settled near Flushing, Michigan, in Clayton Township.

== Career ==
Pond served as clerk of Flushing Township, Michigan, from 1840 to 1841. In March 1846, Clayton Township was officially organized, and Pond was elected as one of its first inspectors of elections. Pond would go on to serve in Clayton Township's local government. That same year, Pond served as the township's first supervisor, as well as a school inspector. Pond was re-elected as supervisor and as a school inspector in 1847. On January 4, 1847, Pond was sworn in as a member of the Michigan House of Representatives from the Genesee County district as a Democratic. He served until March 17, 1847. In 1848, John C. Clement served as supervisor, but when Clement resigned, Pond was appointed to fill his vacancy. In 1849, Pond served as school inspector again. In 1850, Pond served as justice of the peace. In 1851, Pond served as town clerk. Pond again served as justice of the peace in 1858. In 1859, Pond again served as supervisor. In 1860, Pond again served as school inspector, and would do so in 1862 as well. Pond served as justice of the peace in 1866 and 1870. Pond served as one of the founding vice presidents of the Genesee County Pioneer Association. In 1850, Pond served as one of the founding vice presidents of the Genesee County Agricultural Society.

== Personal life ==
Pond married Elvira Call in 1829.

== Death ==
Pond died on July 29, 1887, in Genesee County, Michigan.
