= Pounder (surname) =

Pounder is a surname. Notable people with the surname include:

- CCH Pounder (born 1952), Guyanese-American actor
- Cheryl Pounder (born 1976), Canadian ice hockey player
- Rafton Pounder (1933–1991), Irish politician
- Roy Pounder (born 1944), British medical doctor
- Tony Pounder (born 1966), English footballer
