= Pound (surname) =

Pound is the surname of:

- Albert Pound (1831–1913), American politician and businessman
- Cuthbert Winfred Pound (1864–1935), American lawyer and politician from New York
- Dick Pound (born 1942), Canadian lawyer
- Dudley Pound (1877–1943), British naval officer
- Ezra Pound (1885–1972), American expatriate poet and critic
- Glenn Simpson Pound (1914–2010), American educator
- James Pound (1669–1724), English clergyman and astronomer
- Louise Pound (1872–1958), American folklorist and college professor
- Omar Pound (1926–2010), Anglo-American writer, teacher, and translator
- Robert Pound (1919–2010), American physicist
- Roscoe Pound (1870–1964), American legal scholar and educator
- Stephen Pound (born 1948), British Labour Party politician
- Stephen Bosworth Pound (1833–1911), lawyer, senator and judge
- Thaddeus C. Pound (1833–1914), American politician and businessman, brother of Albert Pound and grandfather of Ezra Pound

== In fiction ==
- Nerdluck Pound, a cartoon alien character in the 1996 animated film Space Jam

== See also ==
- Pounds (surname)
