= Richmond, Virginia slave market =

American business cluster

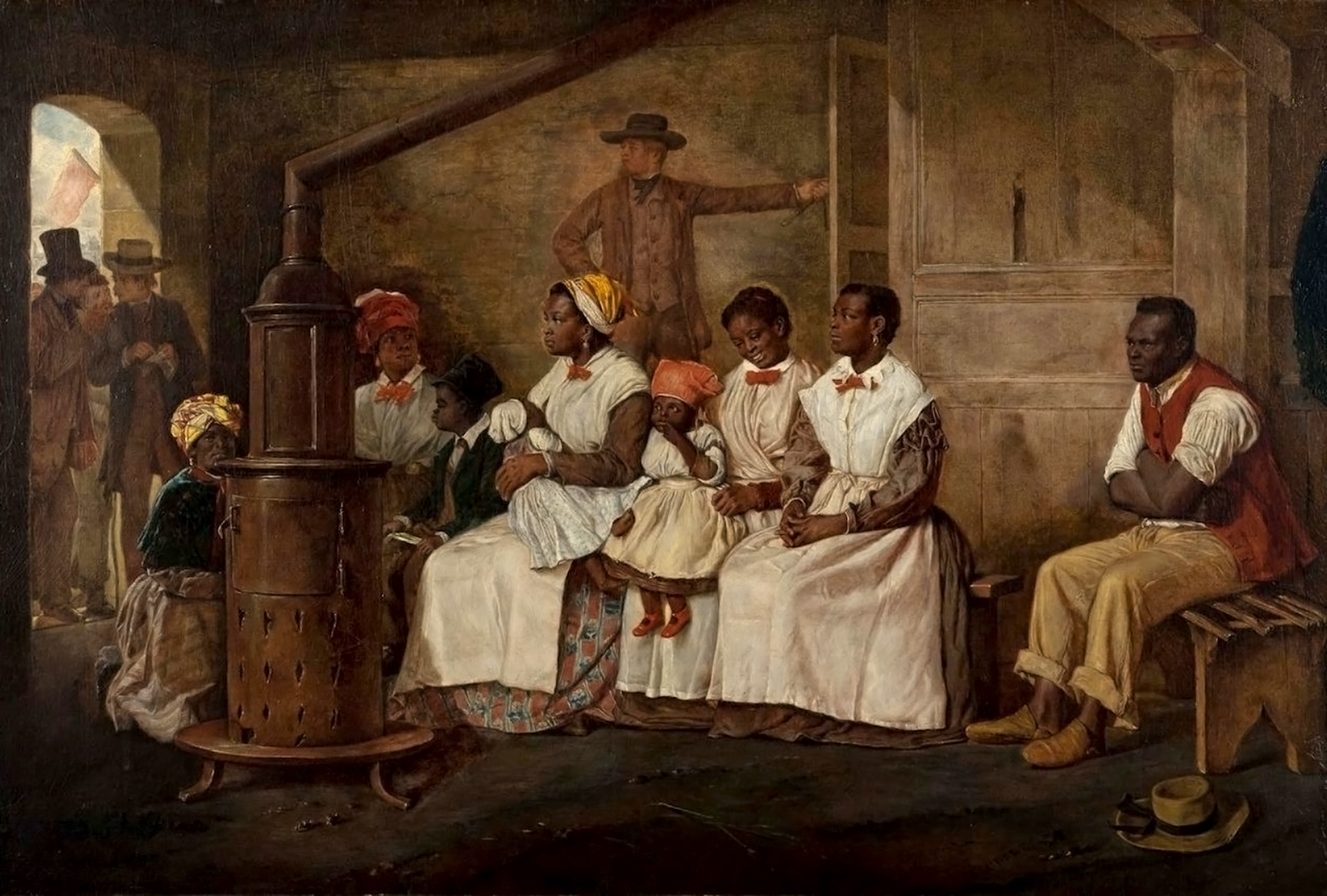
Eyre Crowe, Slaves Waiting for Sale, Richmond, Virginia (1861), painted from a sketch made 1853 when he was touring the U.S. with British novelist William Makepeace Thackeray

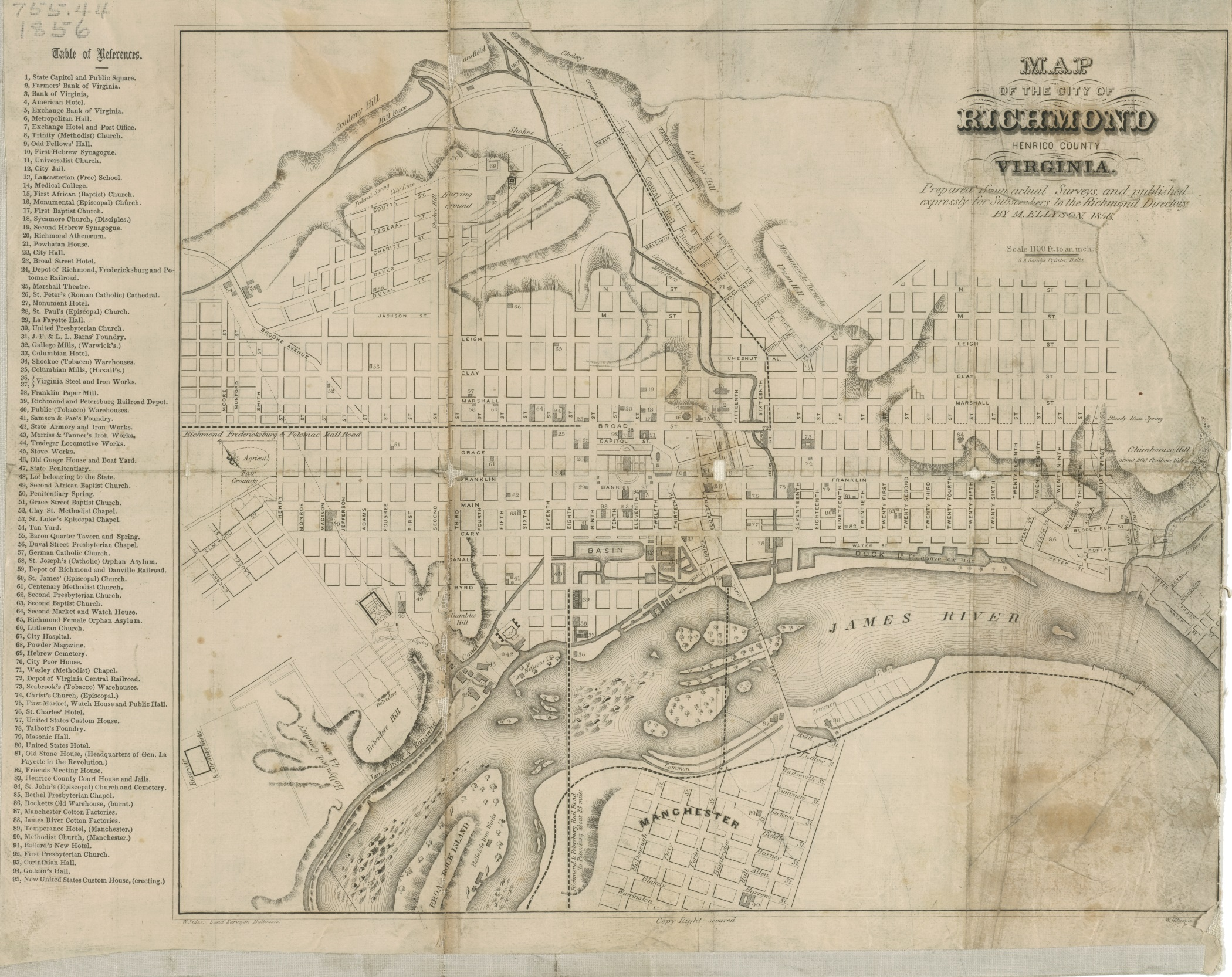
Ellyson's map of Richmond, 1856

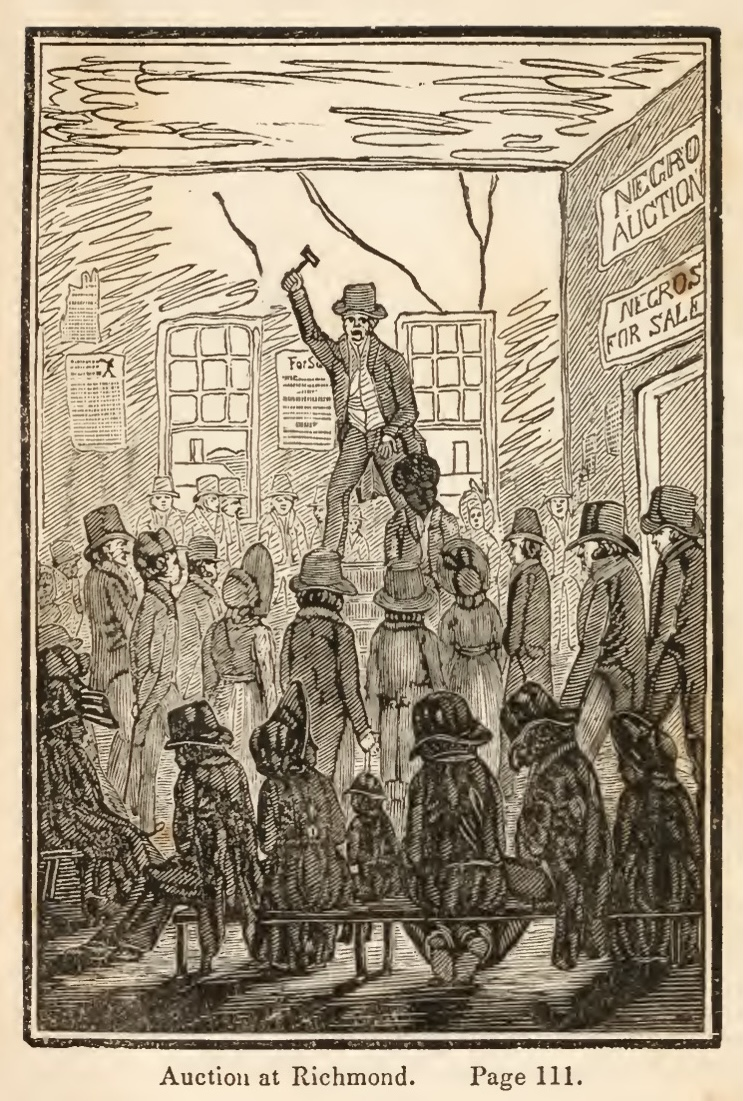
"Auction at Richmond" (Picture of Slavery in the United States of America by Rev. George Bourne, published by Edwin Hunt in Middletown, Conn., 1834)

The Richmond, Virginia slave market was the largest slave market in the Upper South region of the United States in the 1840s and 1850s. An estimated 3,000 to 9,000 slaves were sold out of Virginia annually between 1820 and 1860, many of them through Richmond (as well as Norfolk, Alexandria, Lynchburg, and other Virginia towns). Richmond's slave traders clustered their jails and auction rooms on Wall Street, a narrow alley in a section of the city called Shockhoe Bottom, the valley created by Shockoe Creek, which bisected the city. Traders also used the offices and meeting rooms at the Exchange Hotel, St. Charles Hotel, City Hotel and Odd Fellows' Hall. A visitor of 1852 reported, "There are four [slave depots], and all in the same street, not more than two blocks from the Exchange Hotel, where we are staying. These slave depots are in one of the most frequented streets of the place, and the sales are conducted in the building, on the first floor; and within view of the passers-by. There are small screens, behind which the men of mature years are taken for inspection; but the men and the boys are publicly examined in the open store, before an audience of full one hundred." He reported that only three of 20 men so exhibited had "clean backs" unmarked by whip scarring.

Some of the slaves collected in Richmond were resold to local buyers but in most cases it was a transit camp where slave traders from the cotton and sugar districts of Lower South collected shipping lots for resell at higher prices in Louisiana, Mississippi, Alabama, Georgia, Arkansas, and Texas. "Virginia negroes" were considered a premium product relative to slaves from, say, Missouri, and thus their place of origin was often advertised as such as the New Orleans and Natchez slave markets.

"Now, gentlemen, give me a bid;— anything to start with. Here is a likely young negro, right and tight and sound?" —that was his expression; and between bids he kept repeating it,—"Right and tight and sound."

— Letter of J. A. Nicholls, British visitor to Richmond, 1857

== See also ==
- List of slave traders of the United States
- Slave markets and slave jails in the United States
- Bibliography of the slave trade in the United States
- History of slavery in Virginia

== Sources ==
- Bancroft, Frederic (2023) [1931, 1996]. Slave Trading in the Old South (Original publisher: J. H. Fürst Co., Baltimore). Southern Classics Series. Introduction by Michael Tadman (Reprint ed.). Columbia, S.C.: University of South Carolina Press. ISBN 978-1-64336-427-8. LCCN 95020493. OCLC 1153619151.
- McInnis, Maurie D. (Fall 2013). "Mapping the slave trade in Richmond and New Orleans". Building & Landscapes. 20 (2): 102–125. doi:10.5749/buildland.20.2.0102. JSTOR 10.5749/buildland.20.2.0102. S2CID 160472953. Project MUSE 538683.
