= National Register of Historic Places listings in Cook County, Georgia =

This is a list of properties and districts in Cook County, Georgia that are listed on the National Register of Historic Places (NRHP).

This National Park Service list is complete through NPS recent listings posted March 21, 2025.

== Current listings ==
	Name on the Register	Image	Date listed	Location	City or town	Description
1	Cook County Courthouse	Cook County Courthouse	June 14, 1995 (#95000714)	212 N. Hutchinson Ave. 31°08′21″N 83°25′26″W	Adel	
2	SOWEGA Building	SOWEGA Building	March 29, 1990 (#90000546)	100 S. Hutchinson Ave. 31°08′12″N 83°25′25″W	Adel	Southwest Georgia Melon Growers Association
3	United States Post Office-Adel, Georgia	United States Post Office-Adel, Georgia	January 15, 2009 (#08001319)	115 E. 4th St. 31°08′15″N 83°25′22″W	Adel	
