= Glenwood Historic District (Thomasville, Georgia) =

Historic district in Georgia, United States

- U.S. National Register of Historic Places
- U.S. Historic district
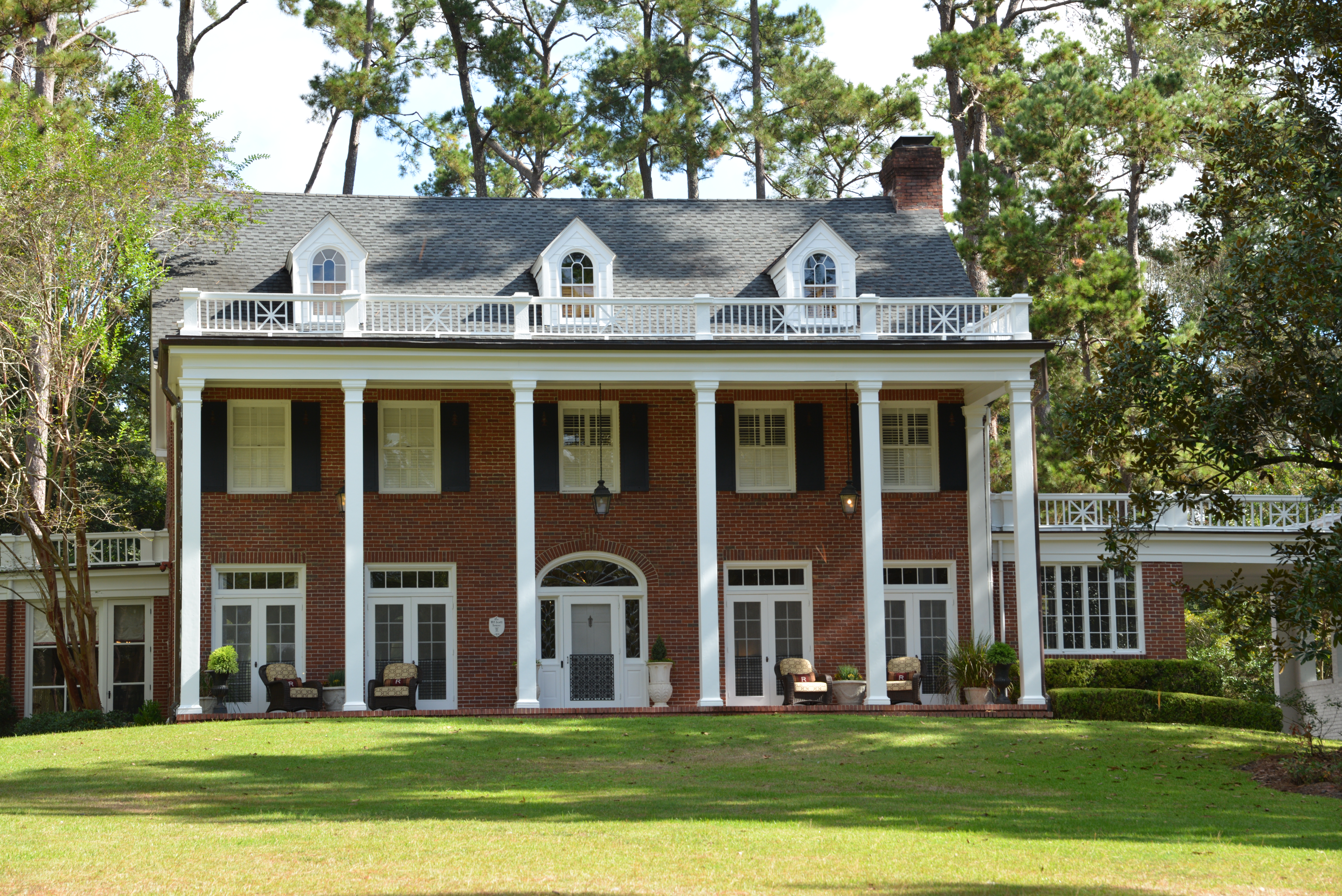

- Location within Georgia Location within the United States
- Location: Roughly bounded by Clay St., Glenwood Dr., East Jackson St., and Euclid Dr., Thomasville, Georgia
- Coordinates: 30°50′55″N 83°58′06″W
- Architect: Russell L. Beutell, Prince Edward Jinright
- Architectural style: Colonial Revival, Mediterranean Revival
- NRHP reference No.: 10000826
- Added to NRHP: October 14, 2010

The Glenwood Historic District in Thomasville, Georgia is a historic district which was listed on the National Register of Historic Places in 2010. The Joe M. Beutell House is in the historic district and is separately listed.

The area designated is approximately the area bounded by Euclid Avenue on the east, East Jackson Street on the south, Glenwood Drive on the west, and Clay Street on the north. It was developed as Glenwood subdivision in 1925, by the developer and realtor J. B. Jemison. It was deemed significant in part "for its design by I. O. Freeman of Atlanta, a civil engineer who promoted a 'system of winding driveways and dignified home sites' with native vegetation and landscape features that are still apparent today."
