= Reed Bingham State Park =

State park in Adel, Georgia, USA

- IUCN category V (protected landscape/seascape)
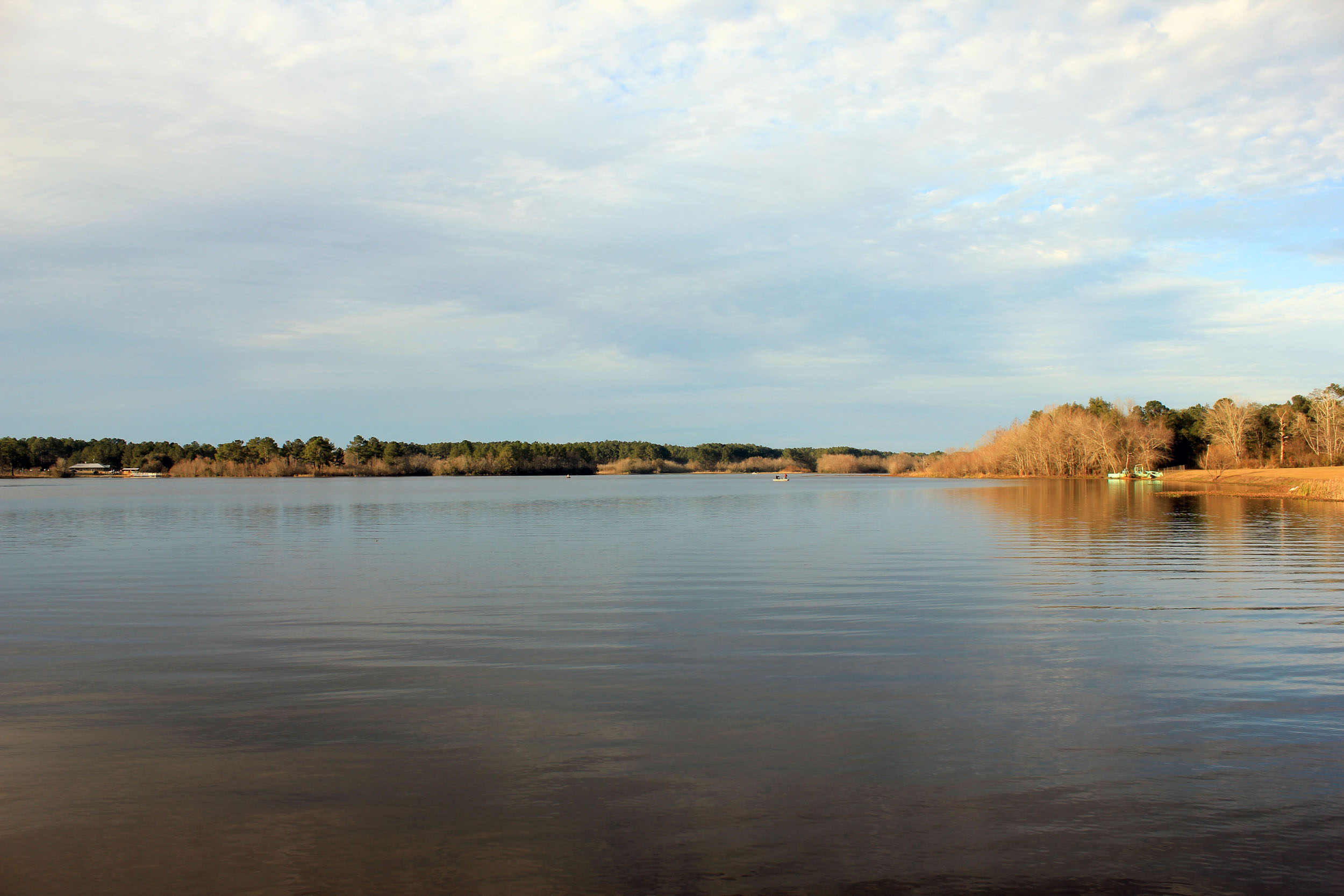
- Reed Bingham Lake
- Interactive map of Reed Bingham State Park
- Location: Colquitt and Cook counties, Georgia, U.S.
- Nearest city: Adel, Ellenton
- Coordinates: 31°09′59″N 83°32′21″W
- Area: 1,613 acres (653 ha)
- Operator: Georgia State Parks & Historic Sites
- Website: gastateparks.org/ReedBingham

Reed Bingham State Park is a 1,613 acre (6.53 km^{2}) Georgia state park in Colquitt County and Cook County located 5 miles east of Ellenton. The park surrounds a 375-acre (1.52 km^{2}) lake that is a tourist attraction in southern Georgia. Inside the park, visitors can hike the 3.5 mile (5.6 km) long Coastal Plains Nature Trail, which goes through a baldcypress swamp, a pitcher plant bog, and sandhill area. The park also contains many animals, including the threatened gopher tortoise and the indigo snake. In addition, the park offers camping and fishing with special ponds for kids that are only open on specific dates. It was named for Amos Reed Bingham who was instrumental in having the park established.

== Facilities ==
- 46 tent/trailer/RV Sites
- 6 picnic shelters
- 4 group shelters
- 3 boat ramps
- 3 fishing docks
- Pioneer camping
- Playground and miniature golf course

== Annual events ==
- Easter Egg Hunt (Easter)
- Fishing Rodeo (Memorial Day, Labor Day, and 4th of July)
