= Cook Middle School =

Cook Middle School may refer to:

- Cook Middle School - Cypress-Fairbanks Independent School District - Harris County, Texas
- Cook Middle School - Cook County School District - Cook County, Georgia
