= SOWEGA Building =

- U.S. National Register of Historic Places
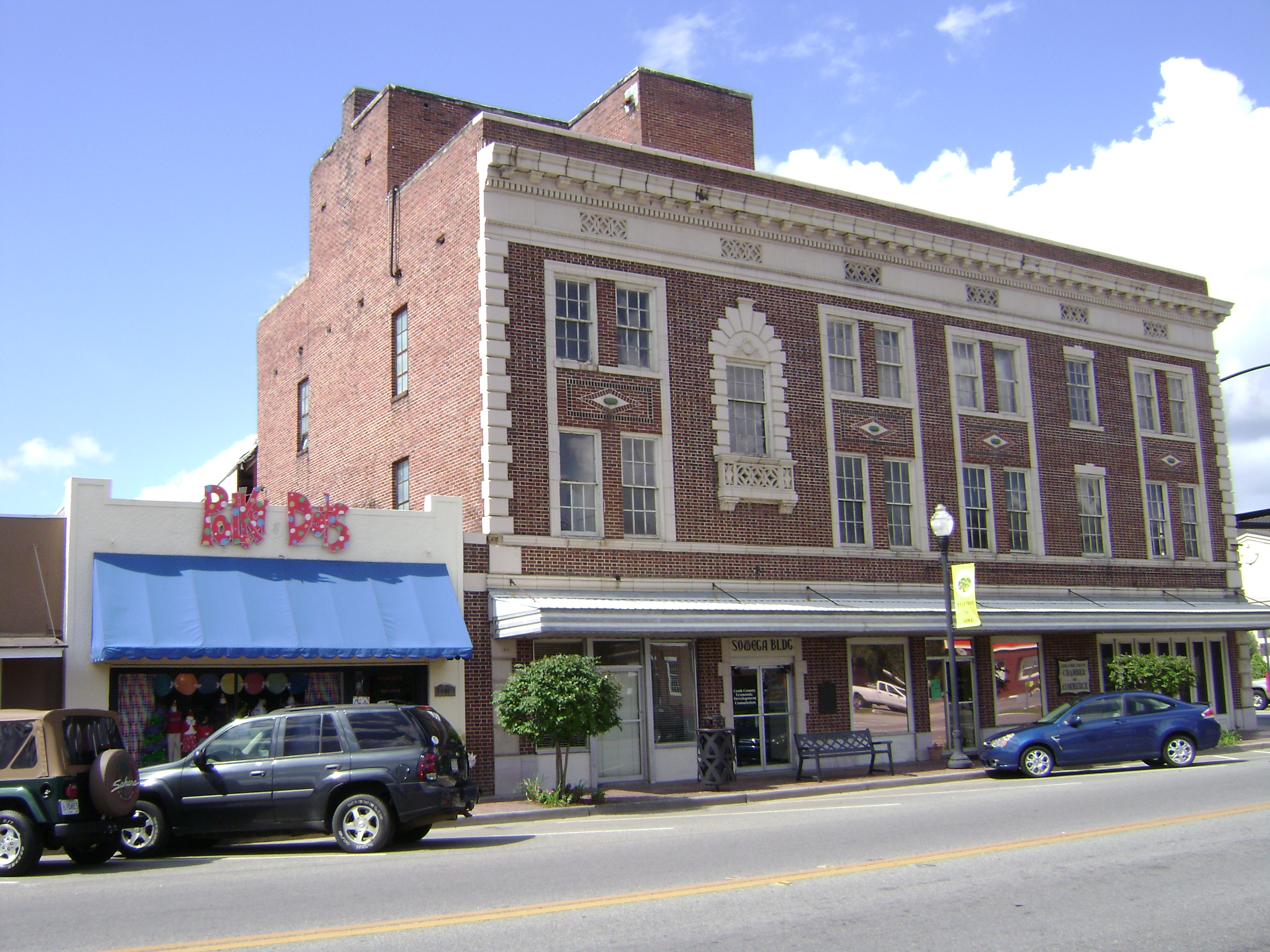
- SOWEGA building, southeast corner

- Location within Georgia Location within the United States
- Location: 100 S. Hutchinson Ave., Adel, Georgia
- Coordinates: 31.1368°N 83.4235°W
- Area: less than one acre
- Built: 1930
- Architect: Daniell & Beutell
- Architectural style: Commercial Style
- NRHP reference No.: 90000546
- Added to NRHP: March 29, 1990

The SOWEGA Building or Southwest Georgia Melon Growers Association Building (also known as The Watermelon Building) in Adel, Georgia at 100 South Hutchinson Avenue (US 41), at the corner with Fourth Street. (SOWEGA comes from SOuth WEst GeorgiA - and "GA" is the abbreviation for "Georgia".) It was built in 1930. It is three stories tall and made of red brick, built in a commercial style. It has a roof deck and a basement. It is made of concrete reinforced with steel. Terracotta trim accents the exterior. The base is finished in marble. It features unique green terracotta watermelons in terracotta lozenges in a broad diamond, which represent the SOWEGA trademark. The third floor was remodeled in the early 1960s and the ground floor was remodeled in 1988. It was listed on the National Register of Historic Places in 1990. The Adel-Cook County Chamber of Commerce currently uses the building.

It was designed by Atlanta architects Daniell & Beutell.

== Photos ==
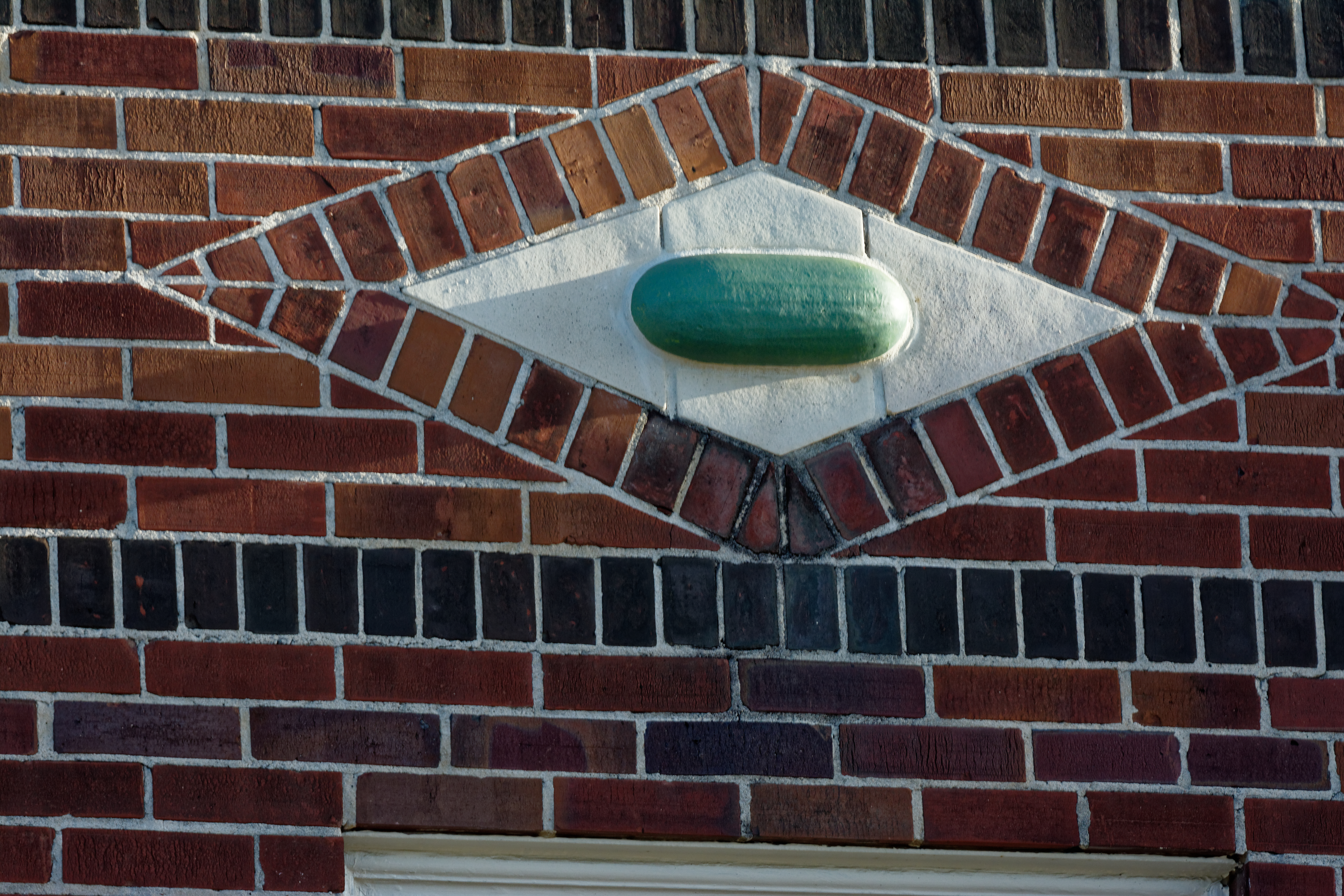
Detail of one of the terracotta watermelons

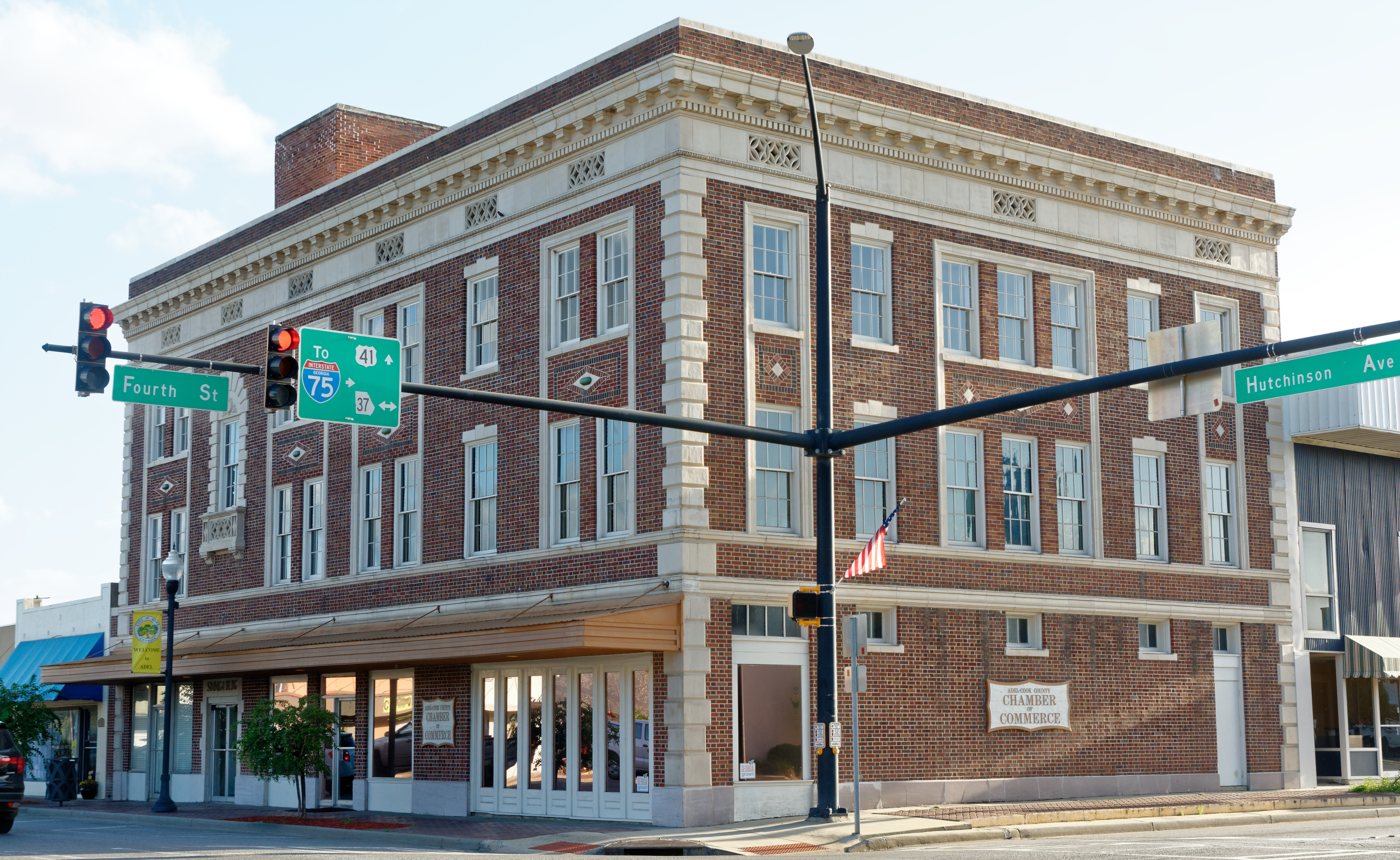
Corner view
