= Daniell & Beutell =

20th-century American architectural firm

Daniell and Beutell was an architectural firm in Atlanta during 1919 to 1941. It was a partnership of Sydney S. Daniell and Russell L. Beutell (1891-1943). They designed various government buildings, theaters, and residences. During the 1930s they focused on design of schools and health clinics.

Their work includes buildings listed on the National Register of Historic Places.

Their office was in the Healey Building.

== Work ==
Works by the firm or by either architect include:

- Gordon Avenue Apartments (1929), an upscale Tudor Revival apartment building at 424 Gordon Avenue in Thomasville, Georgia, (Daniell & Beutell), NRHP-listed
- Joe M. Beutell House (1930), 101 Montrose Dr. Thomasville, GA (Beutell, Russell L.), NRHP-listed Tudor Revival.
- Hall County Courthouse, jct. of Spring and Green Sts. Gainesville, Georgia (Daniell & Beutell), NRHP-listed
- Hartwell City School, College Ave. Hartwell, Georgia (Daniel & Beutell), NRHP-listed
- Manchester Community Building, 105 E 2nd Ave. Manchester, Georgia (Daniell and Beutell), NRHP-listed
- Monroe City Hall, 227 S. Broad St. Monroe, Georgia (Daniel & Beutell), NRHP-listed
- SOWEGA Building, 100 S. Hutchinson Ave. Adel, Georgia (Daniel & Beutell), NRHP-listed
- Gainesville City Hall, Gainesville, Georgia
- a bus station, Atlanta
- Tuberculosis Sanatorium, Alto, Georgia
- Buckhead Theatre (1930), 3110 Roswell Road, Buckhead Village, Buckhead, Atlanta, Georgia
- Grand Theatre (1910), Cartersville, Georgia
- Madison Theater (1927), 496 Flat Shoals Avenue, Atlanta (Daniel & Beutell)

== Photos of works ==
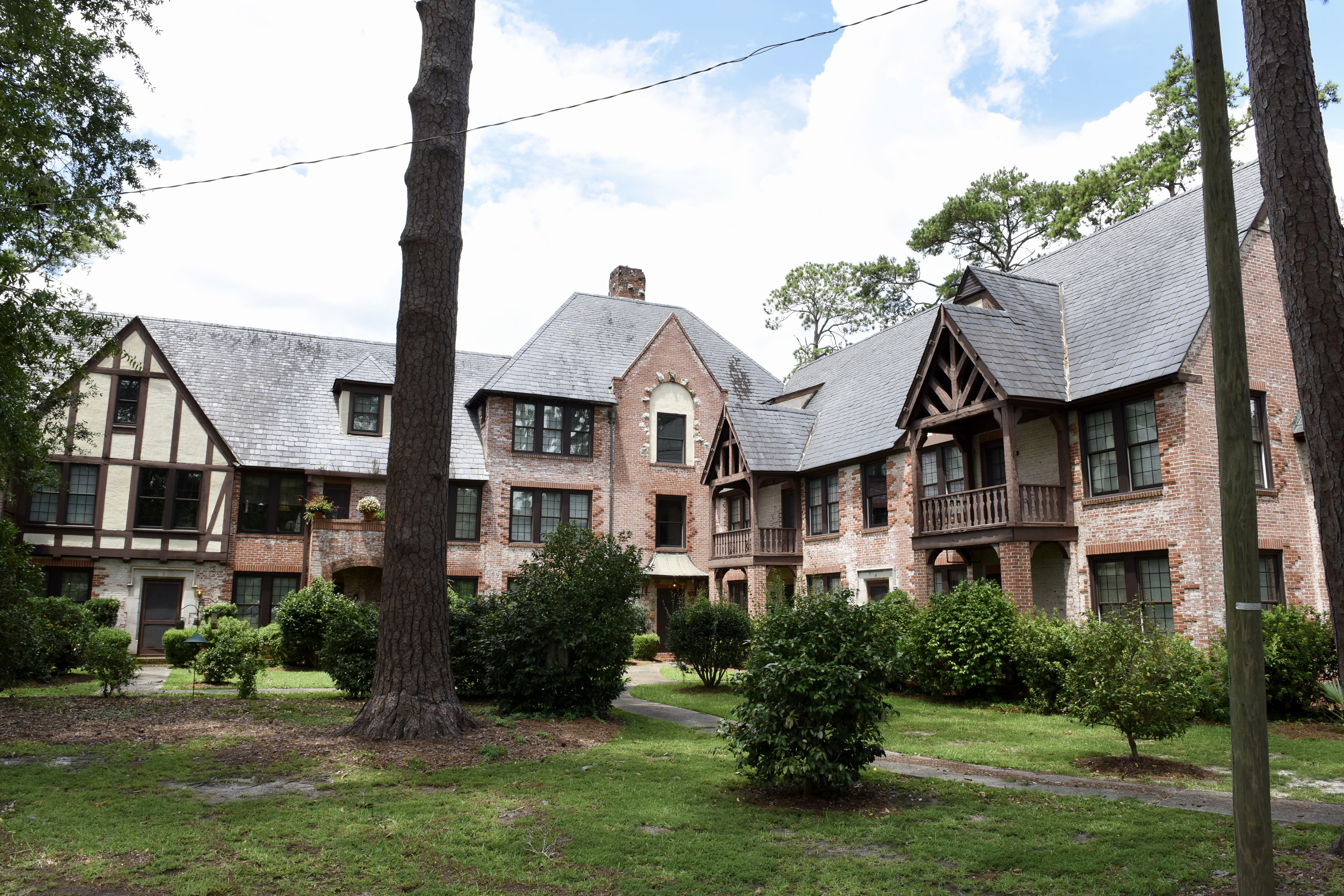
Gordon Avenue Apartments

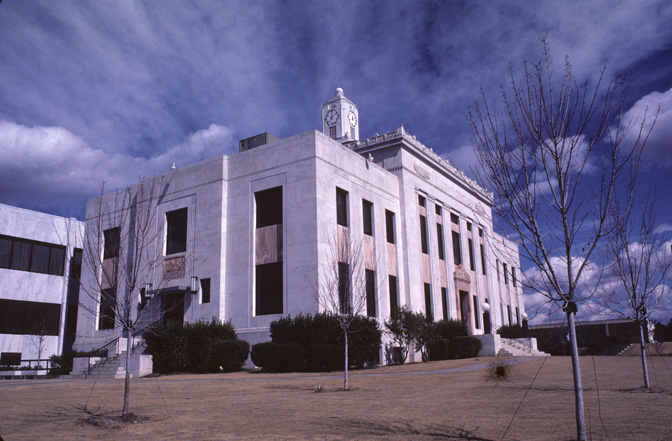
Hall County Georgia Courthouse

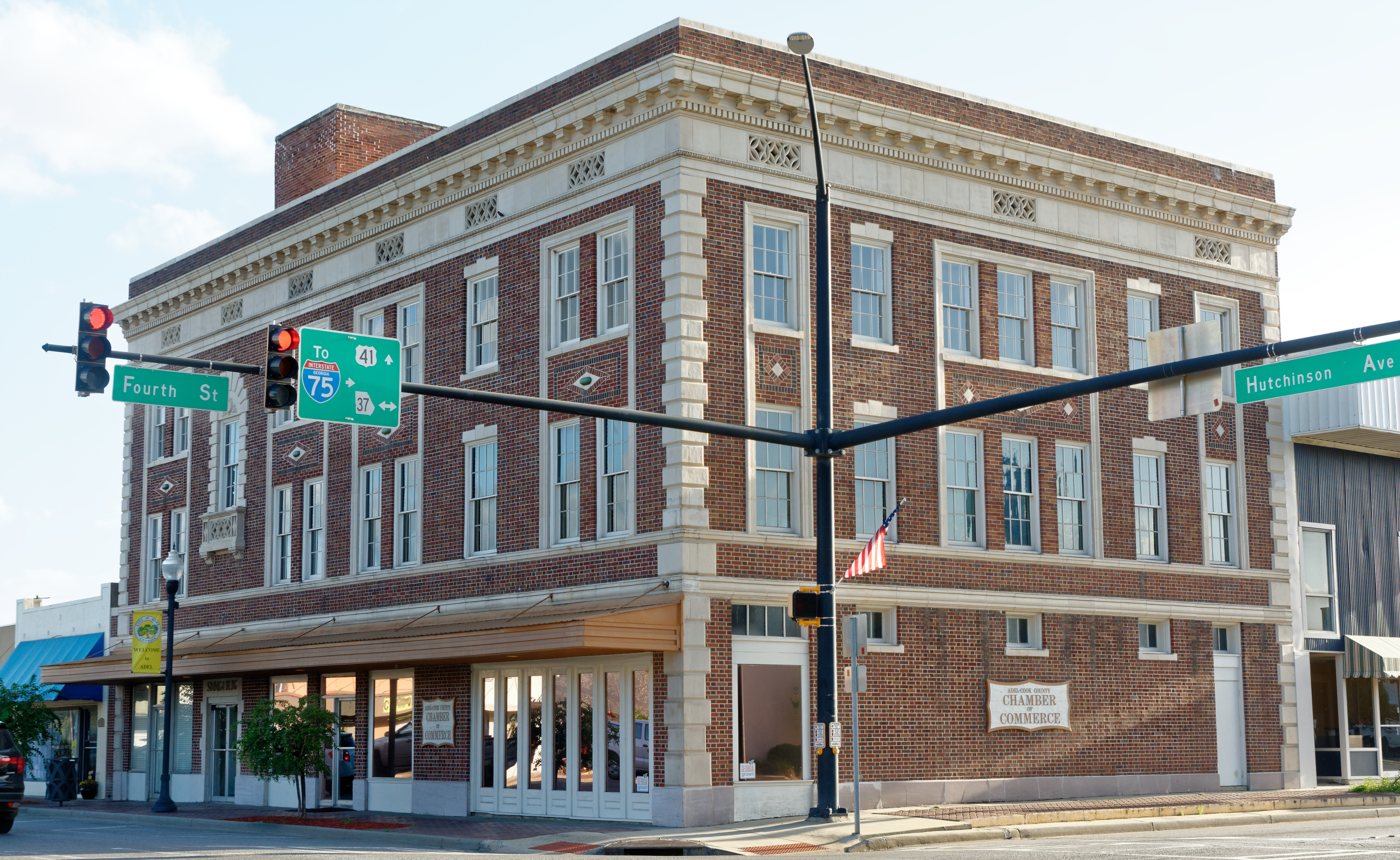
SOWEGA Building

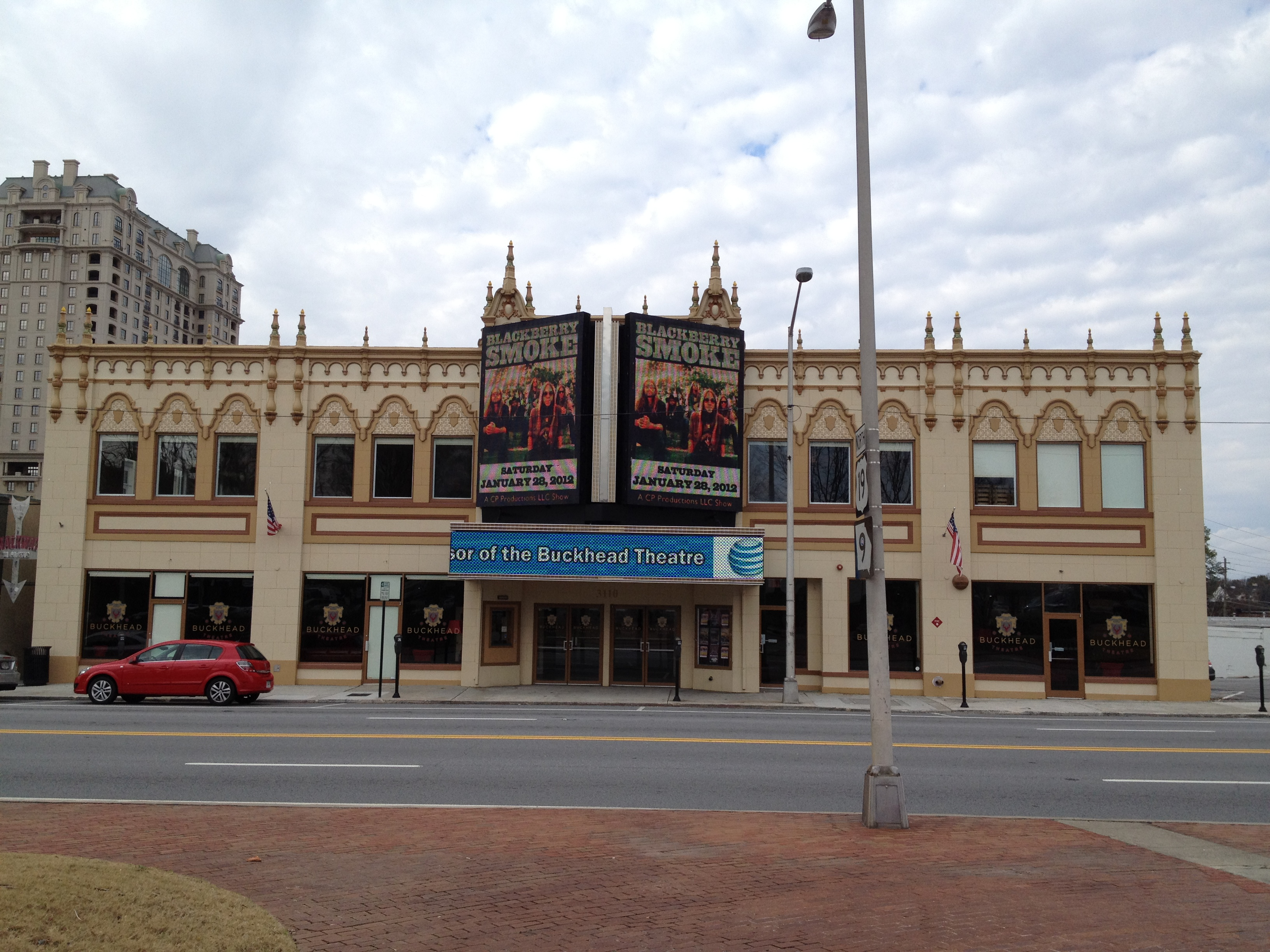
Buckhead Theatre
