= Cook High School (Georgia) =

Public high school in Cook County, Georgia, United States

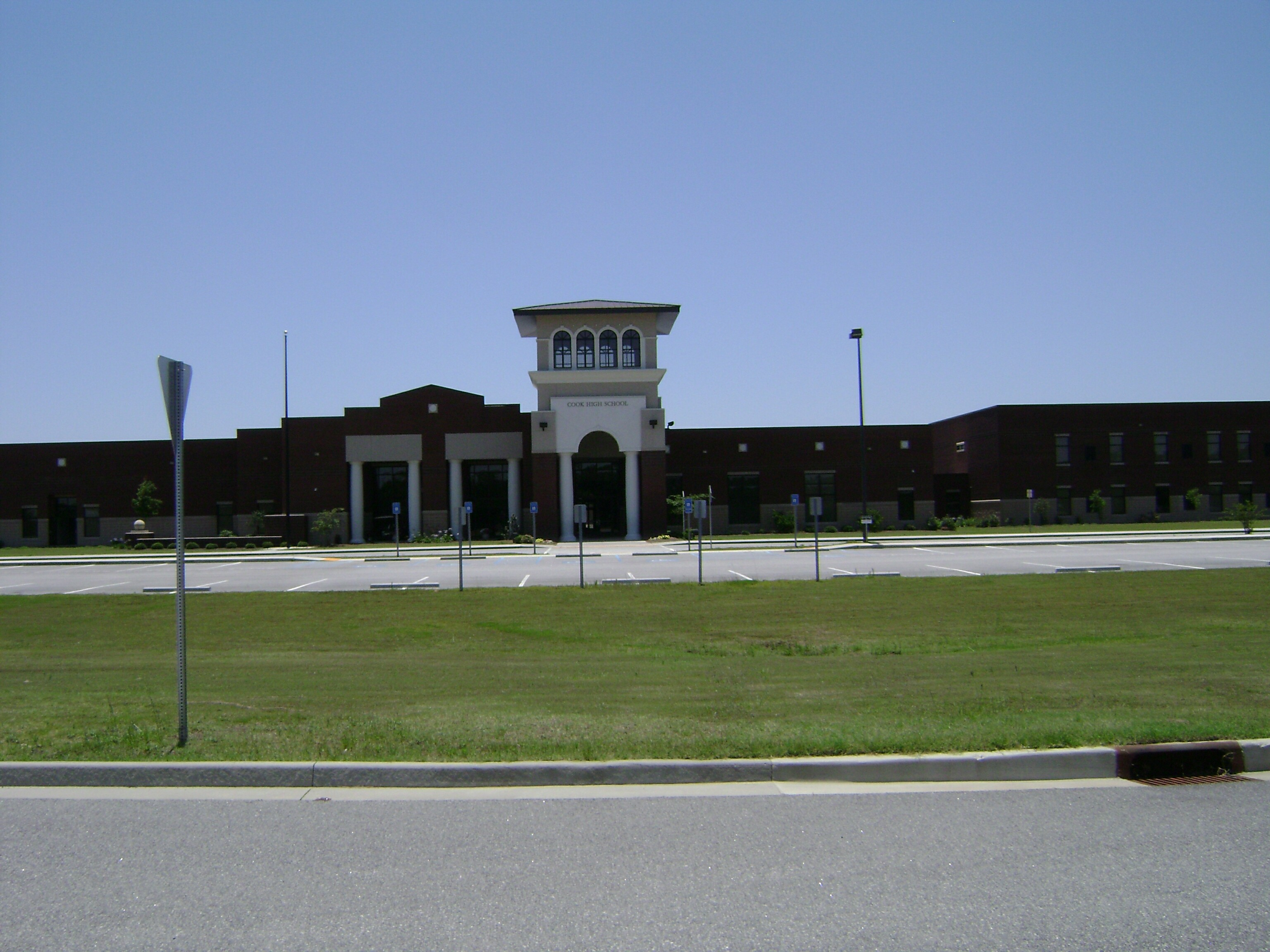

Location
- 9900 Highway 37; Adel, Georgia 31620; United States
- Coordinates: 31°08′01″N 83°23′01″W

Information
- School type: Public high school
- Denomination: Cook County School District
- Opened: August 2009 (Current Building)
- Superintendent: Tim Dixon
- Principal: Joi Williams
- Teaching staff: 64.80 (FTE)
- Grades: 9 – 12
- Gender: Co-ed
- Enrollment: 951 (2023–2024)
- Student to teacher ratio: 14.68
- Education system: Cook County School System
- Colors: Black and gold
- Fight song: "Notre Dame Victory March"
- Mascot: Hornet
- Team name: Hornets
- Rival: Berrien High School
- Accreditation: Southern Association of Colleges and Schools
- Yearbook: The Acorn
- Website: http://chs.cook.k12.ga.us/

Cook High School is a public high school located in Cook County, Georgia, United States, with an Adel postal address. The school is part of the Cook County School District, which serves Cook County.

== Athletics ==
Cook High competes in GHSA Region 1-AA as of the 2021–2022 school year. The school offers the following sports:

- Baseball
- Basketball (boys' and girls')
- Cheerleading
- Football
- Golf
- Soccer (boys' and girls')
- Softball
- Tennis (boys’ and girls’)
- Track (boys’ and girls’)
- Wrestling

== Notable alumni ==
- Ray McKinnon (1975), Actor
- Kenny Tippins (1984), NFL linebacker
- Kelvin Martin (2008), basketball player who played overseas
- Kaleb Cowart (2010), MLB infielder
