= United States Post Office (Adel, Georgia) =

Historic post office in Georgia, US

- United States Post Office-Adel, Georgia
- U.S. National Register of Historic Places
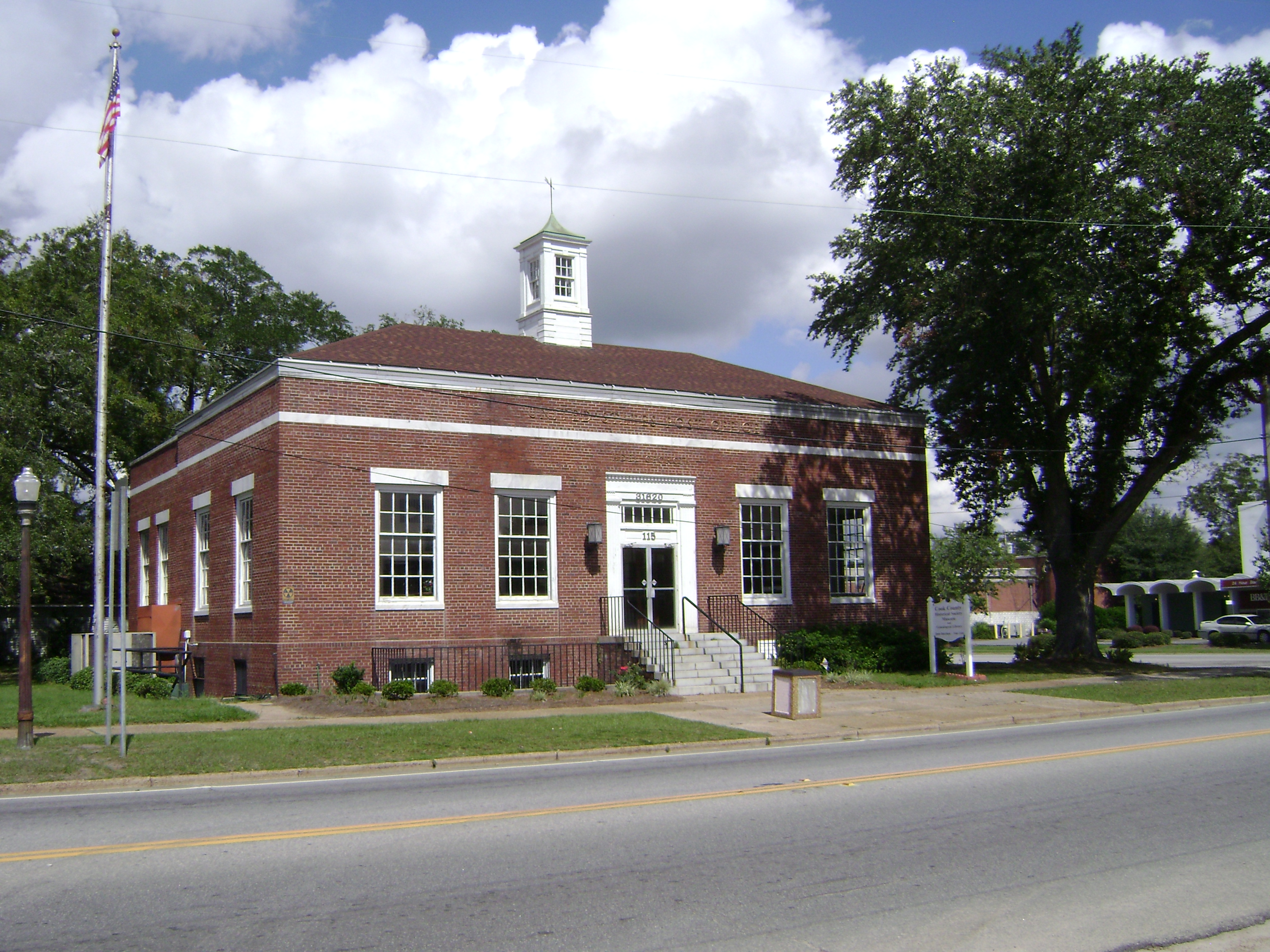
- Southwest corner

- Location within Georgia Location within the United States
- Location: 115 E. 4th St., Adel, Georgia
- Coordinates: 31.1374°N 83.4228°W
- Area: less than one acre
- Built: 1939
- Architect: Louis A. Simon
- Engineer: Neal A. Melick
- Architectural style: Colonial Revival
- NRHP reference No.: 08001319
- Added to NRHP: January 15, 2009

The United States Post Office in Adel, Georgia is a building built in 1939. It is at 115 E. 4th Street (Georgia State Route 76) at the intersection with Parrish Avenue. It is square, one story tall and is in the Colonial Revival style. It was built by the Public Works Administration. The main entrance has broad granite steps with a cast-iron railing. The original wood double doors have been replaced. It served ZIP Code 31620 and was used as a post office until 2001. It was listed on the National Register of Historic Places in 2009 as "United States Post Office-Adel, Georgia". It is now houses the Cook County Historical Society Museum & Genealogical Library.

The post office included a New Deal mural, titled "Plantation Scene" painted by Alice Flint in 1941. The mural now hangs in Adel's new, nonhistoric post office.

== See also ==
- List of United States post offices
