= Cook County School District (Georgia) =

School district in Georgia (U.S. state)

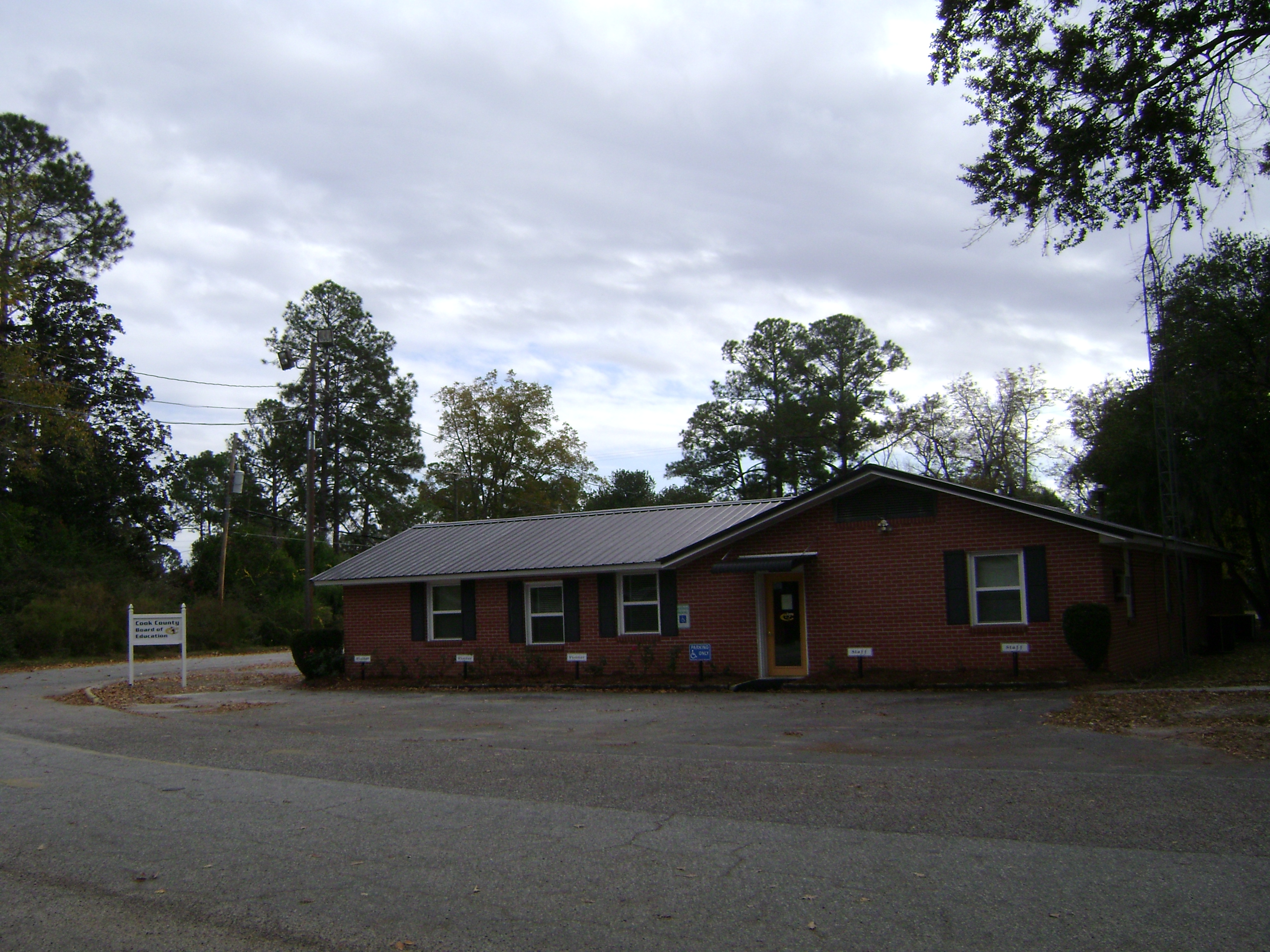

Address
- 1109 North Parrish Avenue Adel, Georgia, 31620-1182; United States
- Coordinates: 31.144234°N 83.424998°W

District information
- Grades: Pre-school - 12
- Superintendent: Dr. Tim Dixon
- Accreditation(s): Southern Association of Colleges and Schools; Georgia Accrediting Commission

Students and staff
- Enrollment: 3,215
- Faculty: 188

Other information
- Telephone: (229) 896-2294
- Fax: (229) 896-3443
- Website: www.cook.k12.ga.us

The Cook County School District is a public school district in Cook County, Georgia, United States, based in Adel. It serves the communities of Adel, Cecil, Lenox, and Sparks.

== Schools ==
The Cook County School District has two elementary schools, one middle school, and one high school.

=== Elementary schools ===
- Cook Elementary School
- Cook County Primary School

=== Middle school ===
- Cook County Middle School

=== High school ===
- Cook High School
