= Kaleb Cowart =

American baseball player (born 1992)

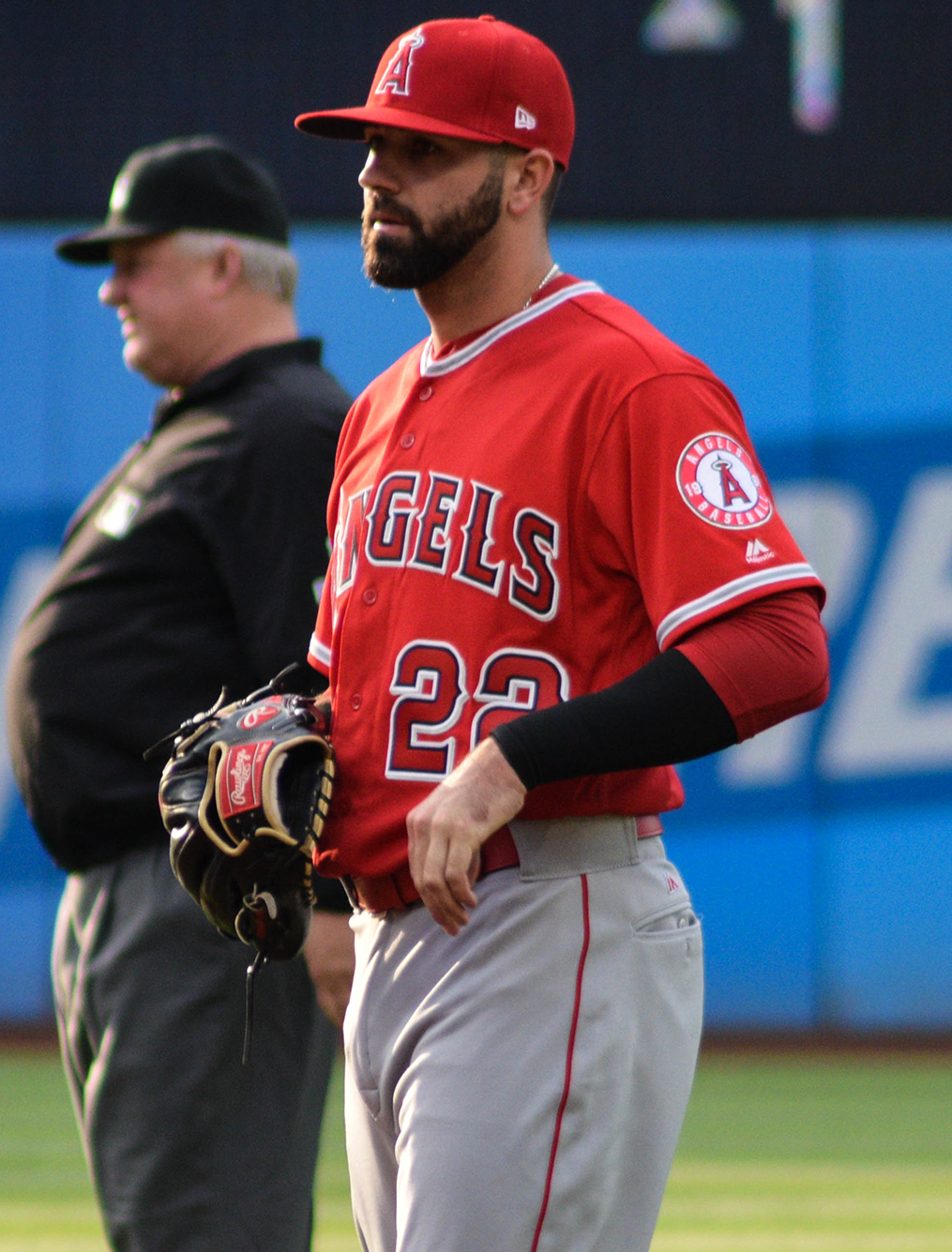
- Cowart with the Los Angeles Angels in 2017
- Third baseman / Pitcher
- Born: June 2, 1992 (age 34); Adel, Georgia, U.S.
- Batted: Switch Threw: Right

MLB debut
- August 18, 2015, for the Los Angeles Angels

Last MLB appearance
- September 29, 2019, for the Los Angeles Angels

MLB statistics
- Batting average: .176
- Home runs: 6
- Runs batted in: 34
- Stats at Baseball Reference

Teams
- Los Angeles Angels of Anaheim / Los Angeles Angels (2015–2019)

Kaleb Bryant Cowart (born June 2, 1992) is an American former professional baseball third baseman and pitcher. He played in Major League Baseball (MLB) from 2015 to 2019 for the Los Angeles Angels.

Cowart won the Gatorade High School Baseball Player of the Year Award in 2010. The Angels selected him in the first round of the 2010 MLB draft and he made his MLB debut as a third baseman in 2015. After playing for the Angels until 2019, he returned to the minor leagues to convert into a pitcher.

== High school ==
Cowart attended Cook High School in Adel, Georgia. In his senior year, Cowart played third base and also pitched. As a pitcher he went 10–1 with a 1.05 earned run average in 73 innings, recording 116 strikeouts and one save. As a batter, he hit .654 with 11 home runs, 59 runs batted in (RBIs) and scored 55 runs. He also recorded a 1.206 slugging percentage, a .721 on-base percentage and was 36/36 in stolen bases. His batting average was the second-highest in state history for a single season.

He was named the 2010 Gatorade National High School Baseball Player of the Year.

== Professional career ==
=== Los Angeles Angels of Anaheim / Los Angeles Angels ===
The Los Angeles Angels of Anaheim selected Cowart in the first round, with the 18th overall selection, in the 2010 Major League Baseball draft. He was selected as a compensation pick from the Seattle Mariners for the signing of Chone Figgins. Though he committed to play baseball at Florida State University, Cowart signed with the Angels.

Cowart played for the Cedar Rapids Kernels of the Single-A Midwest League and Inland Empire 66ers of the High-A California League in 2012. Between the two levels, he had a .276 batting average and 16 home runs in 135 games. Promoted to the Arkansas Travelers of the Double-A Texas League in 2013, Cowart struggled, batting .221 with six home runs and 124 strikeouts in 132 games. Returning to Arkansas in 2014, Cowart batted .223 with six home runs and 99 strikeouts in 126 games.

After two poor seasons, the Angels assigned Cowart to Inland Empire to start the 2015 season, where he demonstrated an improvement in plate discipline. In June, due to promotions of C. J. Cron, Efren Navarro, and Kyle Kubitza to the major leagues, the Angels promoted Cowart to the Salt Lake Bees of the Triple-A Pacific Coast League, where he batted .323/.395/.491.

The Angels promoted Cowart to the major leagues on August 18, 2015. He made his major league debut that night. After the 2015 season, Cowart changed his uniform number from 41 to 22. In 2016, he appeared in 31 games for the Angels, hitting .176. The following season, he played in 50 games, hitting .225 with 3 home runs. He began the 2018 season in Triple–A, being recalled during the season. In 47 games, he hit .134 with 1 home run and 10 RBI.

On December 10, 2018, the Seattle Mariners claimed Cowart off of waivers and announced he would come to spring training as a third baseman and as a pitcher. The Mariners designated him for assignment on January 21, 2019, and he was claimed off waivers by the Detroit Tigers on January 24. Cowart returned to the Angels on February 23, 2019, when they claimed him off waivers from the Tigers.

Cowart split the 2019 minor league season between Mobile and Salt Lake. He hit a combined .276/.331/.433/.764 with 9 home runs and 62 RBI, while going 1-2 with a 10.19 ERA over 17 2/3 innings pitched. On September 18, 2019, the Angels selected Cowart's contract. Cowart elected free agency following the 2019 season.

=== New York Yankees ===
On December 20, 2019, Cowart signed a minor league contract with the New York Yankees. Cowart did not play in a game in 2020 due to the cancellation of the minor league season because of the COVID-19 pandemic. He also did not play in a game in 2021 due to an undisclosed injury. He elected free agency following the season on November 7, 2021.

On April 19, 2022, Cowart re-signed with the Yankees organization on a new minor league contract. He made one appearance for the rookie-level Florida Complex League Yankees before spending the remainder of the year with the Double-A Somerset Patriots. In 15 appearances for Somerset, Cowart posted a 2-0 record and 4.20 ERA with 14 strikeouts in 15.0 innings pitched. He was released by the Yankees on April 3, 2023.
