= Lenox, Georgia =

- Town
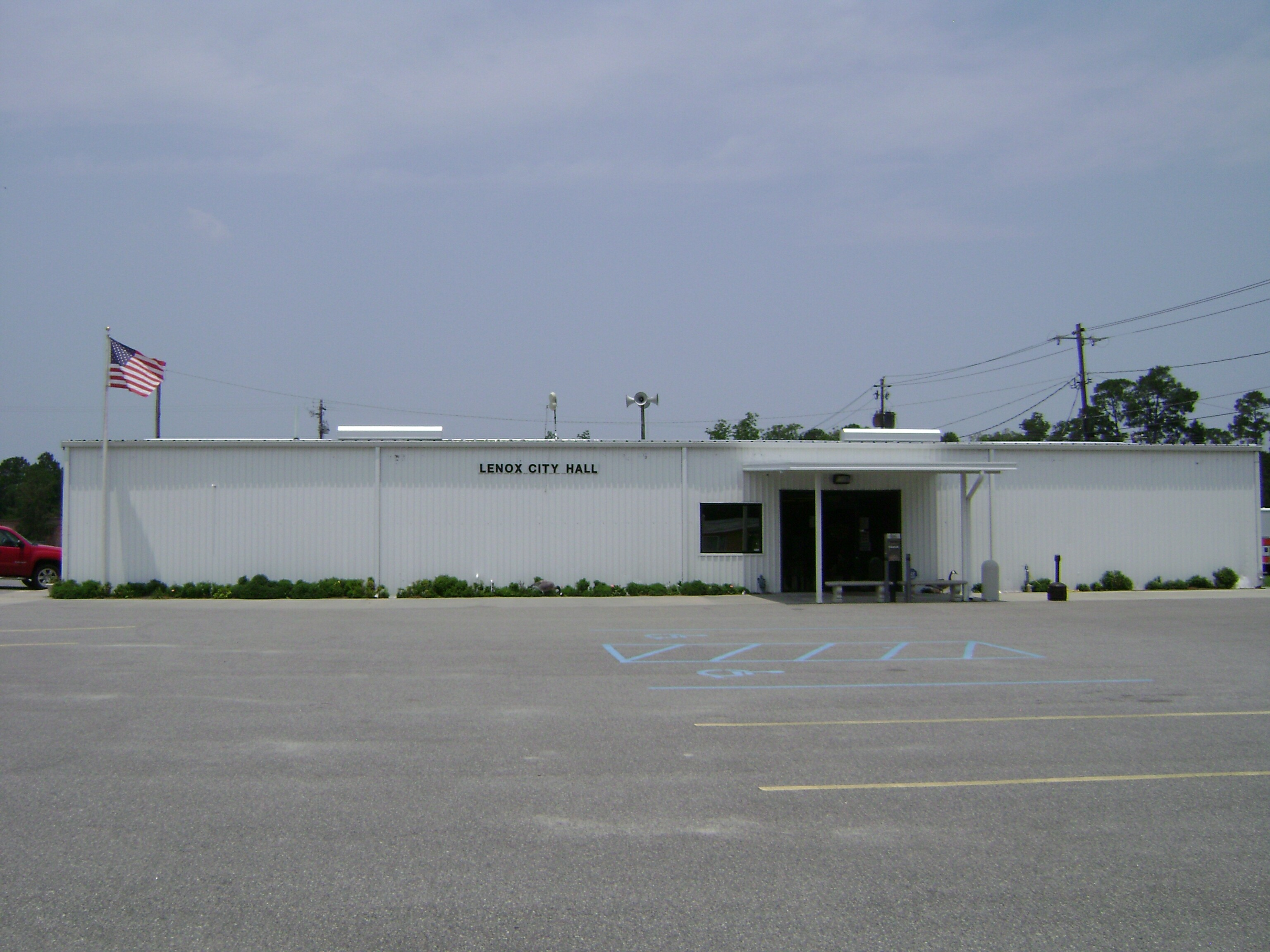
- Lenox City Hall

- Location in Cook County and the state of Georgia
- Coordinates: 31°16′N 83°28′W
- Country: United States
- State: Georgia
- County: Cook

Area
  - Total: 1.63 sq mi (4.21 km^{2})
  - Land: 1.59 sq mi (4.13 km^{2})
  - Water: 0.031 sq mi (0.08 km^{2})
- Elevation: 289 ft (88 m)

Population (2020)
  - Total: 752
  - Density: 471.9/sq mi (182.19/km^{2})
- Time zone: UTC-5 (Eastern (EST))
  - Summer (DST): UTC-4 (EDT)
- ZIP code: 31637
- Area code: 229
- FIPS code: 13-45936
- GNIS feature ID: 0316766
- Website: cityoflenox.municipalimpact.com

Lenox is a town in Cook County, Georgia, United States. The population was 752 at the 2020 census.

== History ==
Lenox was platted in 1888, when the railroad was extended to that point. According to tradition, the town was named after a certain "lean ox". The Georgia General Assembly incorporated the town in 1901.

== Geography ==
Lenox is located in northern Cook County at 31°16′N 83°28′W (31.2712, -83.4654). U.S. Route 41 passes through the center of the town as Robinson Street, and Interstate 75 passes through the west side of the town, with access from Exit 49. Tifton is 13 miles (21 km) to the north, and Adel, the Cook County seat, is 10 miles (16 km) to the south.

According to the United States Census Bureau, Lenox has a total area of 1.6 square miles (4.2 km^{2}), of which 0.031 square miles (0.08 km^{2}), or 1.86%, is water.

== Demographics ==
Historical population
Census	Pop.	Note	%±
1910	206		—
1920	339		64.6%
1930	412		21.5%
1940	547		32.8%
1950	789		44.2%
1960	802		1.6%
1970	860		7.2%
1980	965		12.2%
1990	783		−18.9%
2000	889		13.5%
2010	873		−1.8%
2020	752		−13.9%
U.S. Decennial Census; 1850-1870 1870-1880; 1890-1910 1920-1930; 1940 1950 1960; 1970 1980 1990; 2000 2010

Lenox racial composition as of 2020
Race	Num.	Perc.
White (non-Hispanic)	424	56.38%
Black or African American (non-Hispanic)	244	32.45%
Asian	2	0.27%
Other/Mixed	30	3.99%
Hispanic or Latino	52	6.91%

As of the 2020 United States census, there were 752 people, 333 households, and 194 families residing in the town.

== Festivities ==
Lenox is the home of the Lean-Ox Festival, the oldest festival in Cook County. It is held the third weekend of November every year.

== Speeding ticket controversy ==
In July 2024, the Georgia Department of Public Safety (DPS) suspended the speed detection device permits for the city of Lenox for 180 days after a state investigation found that the city “consistently altered” tickets that “had the effect of excluding the fines and forfeitures for citations issued for speeding". This was apparently done to circumvent a state law that limits the amount a locality can raise via speeding tickets.
