= Ken Tippins =

American football player (born 1966)

No. 98, 52
- Position: Linebacker

Personal information
- Born: July 22, 1966 (age 60); Adel, Georgia, U.S.
- Listed height: 6 ft 1 in (1.85 m)
- Listed weight: 235 lb (107 kg)

Career information
- High school: Cook (Adel)
- College: Middle Tennessee
- NFL draft: 1989: undrafted

Career history
- Dallas Cowboys (1989); Atlanta Falcons (1990–1995)

Awards and highlights
- 2× All-OVC (1987, 1988)

Career NFL statistics
- Tackles: 285
- Fumble recoveries: 4
- Interceptions: 2
- Stats at Pro Football Reference

Kenneth Tippins (born July 22, 1966) is an American former professional football player who was a linebacker in the National Football League (NFL) for the Dallas Cowboys and Atlanta Falcons. He played college football for the Middle Tennessee Blue Raiders.

== Early life ==
Tippins was born in Adel, Georgia. He attended Cook High School, where he practiced football and basketball. He received All-county honors as a senior.

He accepted a football scholarship to play at Middle Tennessee State University, where he was a three-year starter at defensive end and a two-time All-OVC selection. In 1987 against Eastern Kentucky University, he posted 11 tackles, one sack, one interception and recovered 2 fumbles. As a senior, he deflected a team-high 7 passes. He finished his career with 151 tackles (20 for loss) and 9 sacks.

In 1990 after playing his first NFL season, he returned to school to work on his Physical Education degree at a time when the basketball team was left with only 3 active players, after suspensions were handed down following a bench-clearing brawl against Tennessee Tech University. Because he was still technically eligible to play basketball, he ended up being a part of the team for 4 games and had a chance to play against future NBA player Popeye Jones. He also finished with a 100 field goal percentage after making his only shot.

== Professional career ==
=== Dallas Cowboys ===
Tippins signed as an undrafted free agent with the Dallas Cowboys in 1989, with the intention of being converted into an outside linebacker. He initially joined the practice squad, before being promoted to the active roster for the eleventh game of the season against the Miami Dolphins.

=== Atlanta Falcons ===
He signed as a free agent with the Atlanta Falcons on May 9, 1990, starting 2 games. He was named a regular starter midway through the next season and in 1992. He returned to a backup role in the following years. In 1994, he started 7 games.

== Personal life ==
In March 2009, he was sentenced to ten years in prison with four to serve after pleading guilty to cocaine-related offences. In 2010, he was released after serving one year in prison.

In April 2019, he was sentenced for drug trafficking charges to twelve years and seven months in prison followed by three years supervised release. This was his third drug conviction.
