= Gordon Avenue Historic District =

Historic district in Georgia, United States

- U.S. National Register of Historic Places
- U.S. Historic district
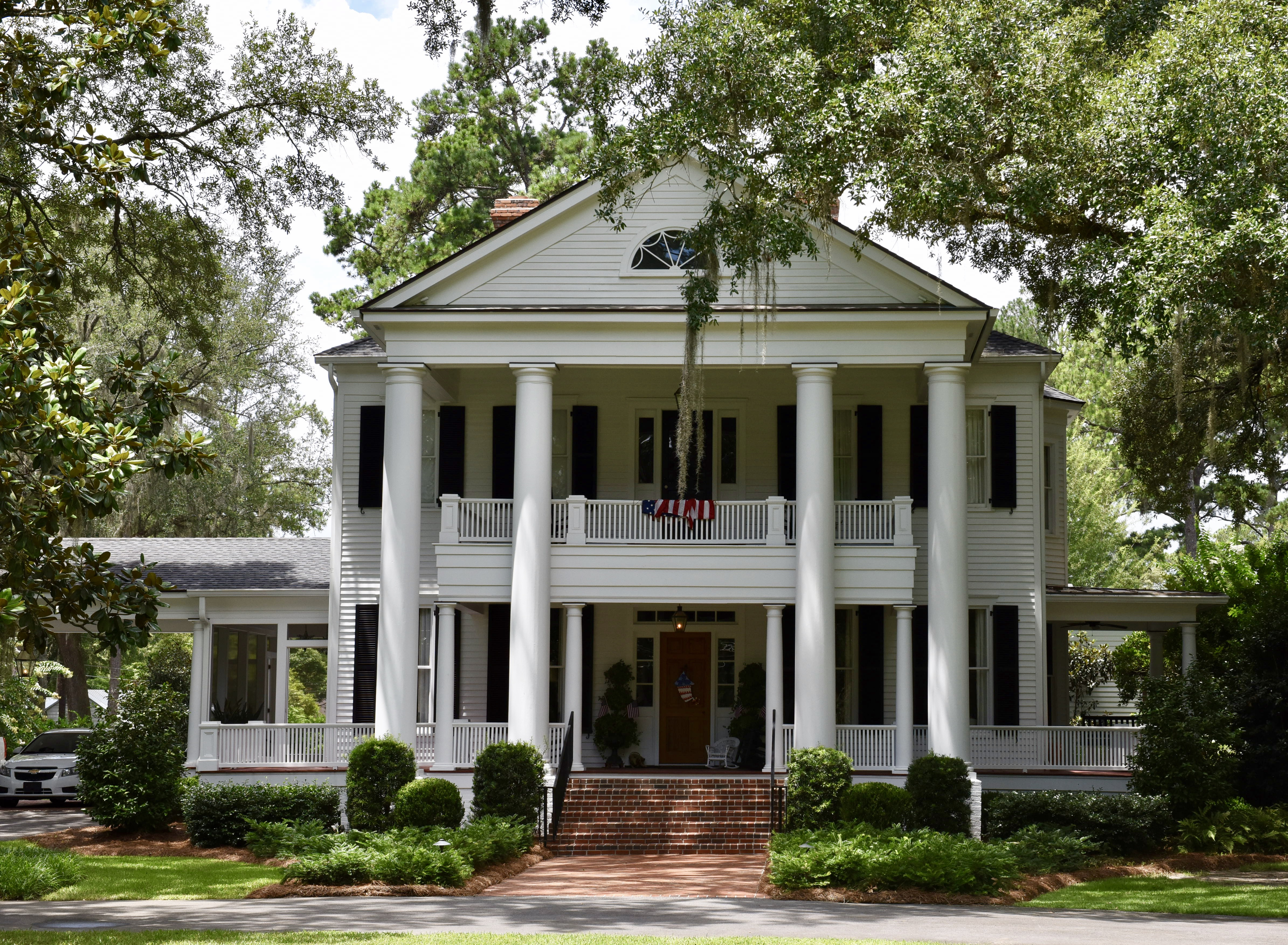
- Theo Titus House - 936 Gordon Avenue

- Location within Georgia Location within the United States
- Location: Gordon Ave., Thomasville, Georgia
- Coordinates: 30°49′18″N 83°58′27″W
- Area: 24 acres (9.7 ha)
- Built: 1890
- Architect: Multiple
- Architectural style: Classical Revival, Late Victorian
- NRHP reference No.: 85000860
- Added to NRHP: April 18, 1985

The Gordon Avenue Historic District in Thomasville, Georgia is a 24 acres (9.7 ha) historic district which was listed on the National Register of Historic Places in 1985. Its five contributing buildings are houses on large lots on Gordon Avenue, an avenue which radiates to the southeast of the center of Thomasville. The properties are the two lots before Junius Street and the three lots after, on the right, when heading south on Gordon, at numbers 924, 936, 1008, 1012, and 1104. The first two are Classical Revival buildings with monumental porticos having Doric columns.

The properties were deemed significant for the architecture of the buildings, for the landscaping of the properties, and for its local history. It was asserted that Gordon Avenue was, in the late 1800s, "a popular street for driving carriages and bicycles, rivaling Paradise Park and Pinetree Boulevard in the beauty of its wooded areas."

Note, the Gordon Avenue Apartments at 424 Gordon Ave. was also listed on the NRHP, in 1983.
