= Buckhead Theatre =

Theater in Atlanta, Georgia, United States

Buckhead Theatre by SCANA Energy

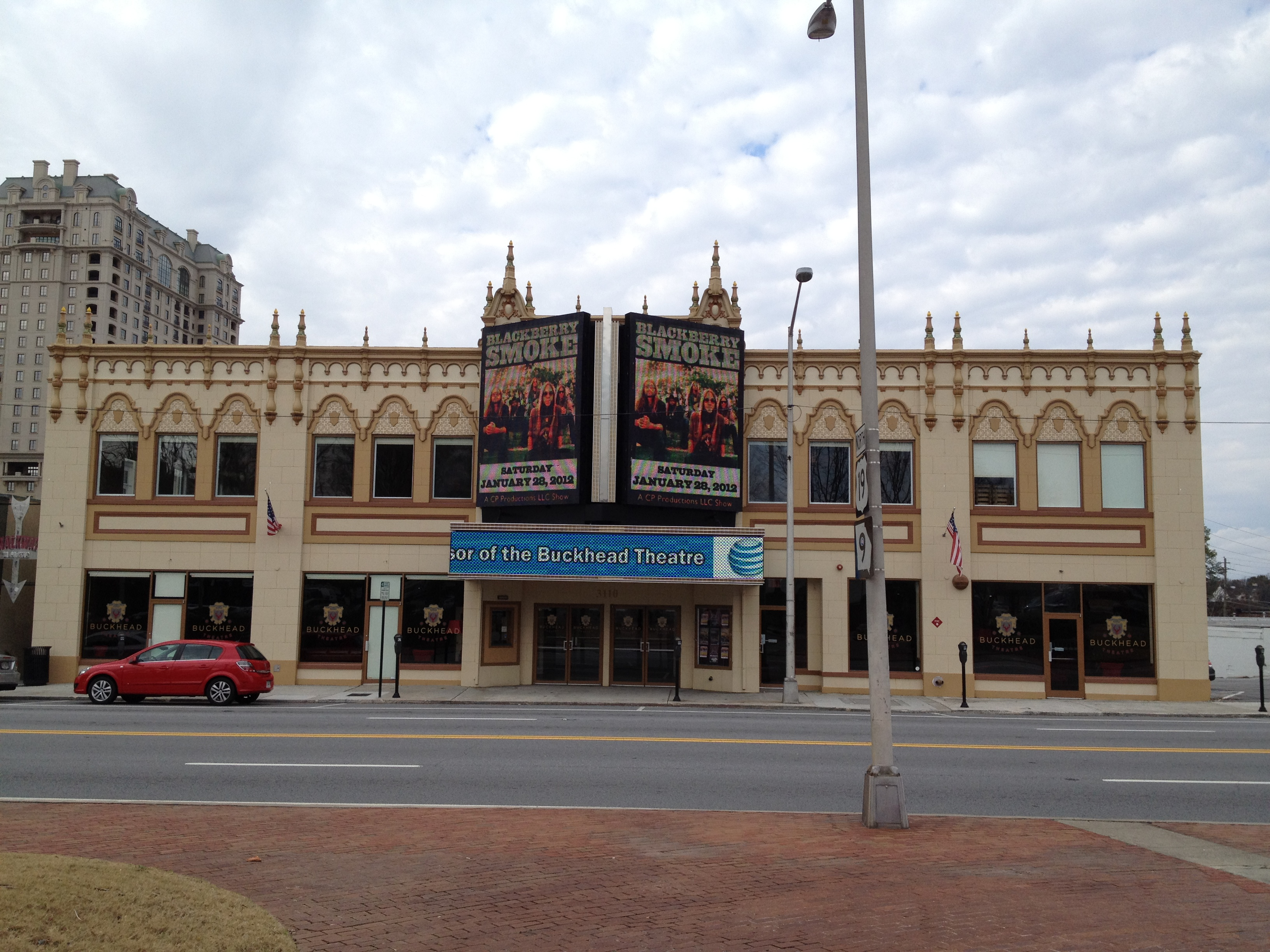
- The exterior of Buckhead Theatre seen from Loudermilk Park, 2012
- Interactive map of Buckhead Theatre by SCANA Energy
- Former names: Buckhead Theatre (1930-61; 2010-2026); Capri Theatre (1961-78); Capri Ballroom (1979-80); Buckhead Cinema & Drafthouse (1980-86); Buckhead Roxy (1987-88); The Roxy (1989-92); Coca-Cola Roxy Theatre (1992-2008)
- Address: 3110 Roswell Rd NW; Atlanta, GA 30305-1841
- Location: Buckhead Village
- Coordinates: 33.8403°N 84.3798°W
- Owner: Charles Loudermilk
- Operator: Live Nation
- Capacity: 1,800

Construction
- Opened: June 2, 1930
- Renovated: 1961, 1977–78, 1994–95, 2008–10, 2018
- Cost: $250,000 ($4.69 million in 2025 dollars)
- Architectural style: Spanish Baroque Revival
- Architect: Daniell & Beutell

Website
- Official website

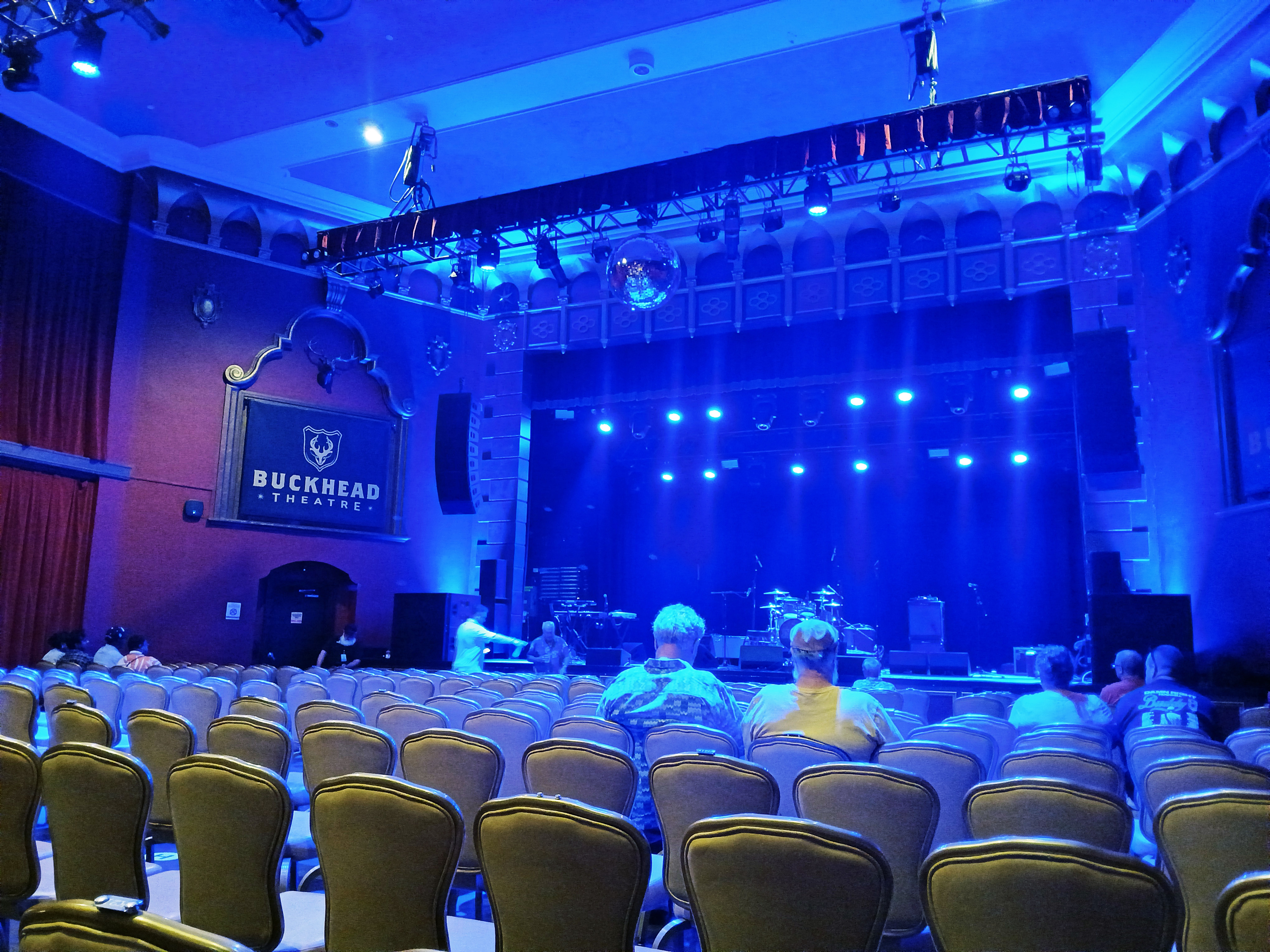
Inside

Buckhead Theatre by SCANA Energy is a theatre located in the Buckhead neighborhood of Atlanta, Georgia, U.S.

== History ==
The establishment was built in 1930 in Spanish baroque style by Atlanta architecture firm Daniell & Beutell and opened on June 2, 1930. Primarily functioning as a second-run movie theater, it also hosted civic functions and concerts of the Buckhead Symphony Orchestra. It was operated by Affiliated Theaters, a subsidiary of McLendon Theatres. Lease holders Davis & Coart sold the lease in 1935 to the company Terry McDaniel of Montgomery.

In 1961, it converted to a first run policy and joined the Weis Theater chain as the Capri Theatre. In the mid-1980s, it was called Buckhead Cinema ‘N’ Drafthouse, until it was converted into the Coca-Cola Roxy Theatre.

A significant Atlanta concert venue in the 1990s and most of the 2000s, the Roxy finally closed after Live Nation and Clear Channel ended their lease in 2008. It was then purchased by Aaron's, Inc., founder Charles Loudermilk. After two years of renovation, the venue reopened in June 2010 under the original name Buckhead Theatre.

In 2017, Live Nation resumed control of the theater as sole booker and operator, though Loudermilk retained ownership of the building. Live Nation subsequently spent at least $7 million renovating the theater, with work starting in February 2018. In November 2026, the venue entered a naming rights agreement with local company, SCANA Energy, and is now known as Buckhead Theatre by SCANA Energy.

== Performers ==
- A Day To Remember
- Aaron Carter
- The Airborne Toxic Event
- AJR
- Albert Hammond Jr.
- Aly & AJ
- Andrew McMahon in the Wilderness
- The Babys
- Beats Antique
- Ben Folds Five
- Black Veil Brides
- The Boomtown Rats
- Bruce Hampton
- Camper Van Beethoven
- Chapo Trap House
- Charli XCX
- Chvrches
- The Cure
- Citizen Cope
- Christone "Kingfish" Ingram
- The Devil Wears Prada
- Danny Ocean
- Dixie Dregs
- Dua Lipa
- Elektric Band II
- Falling In Reverse
- Feid
- Fetchin’ Bones
- Finch
- Fifth Harmony
- Follow for Now
- The Gaslight Anthem
- Gavin DeGraw
- Hanson
- Harry Styles
- Indigo Girls
- Issues
- Jessie James Decker
- Jesus and Mary Chain
- JoJo
- Jon Bon Jovi
- Kesha
- King Crimson
- LANY
- Lou Reed
- Madison Beer
- Melanie Martinez
- The Minimalists
- MisterWives
- Morat (band)
- Mumford & Sons
- The New Pornographers
- Nine Inch Nails
- The Offspring
- Oingo Boingo
- Pat Metheny Group
- Pat Green
- Papa Roach
- Peter Tosh
- Phish
- Paul Westerberg
- Randall Bramblett
- Ray Charles
- Sabrina Carpenter
- Sarah Vaughan
- Scissor Sisters
- Sea Level
- Talking Heads
- 'til Tuesday
- The The
- Tinashe
- Tragically Hip
- Travis Tritt
- Victoria Monet
- Waylon Jennings
- Wolf Alice
- Wynonna Judd
