= Gordon Avenue Apartments =

- U.S. National Register of Historic Places
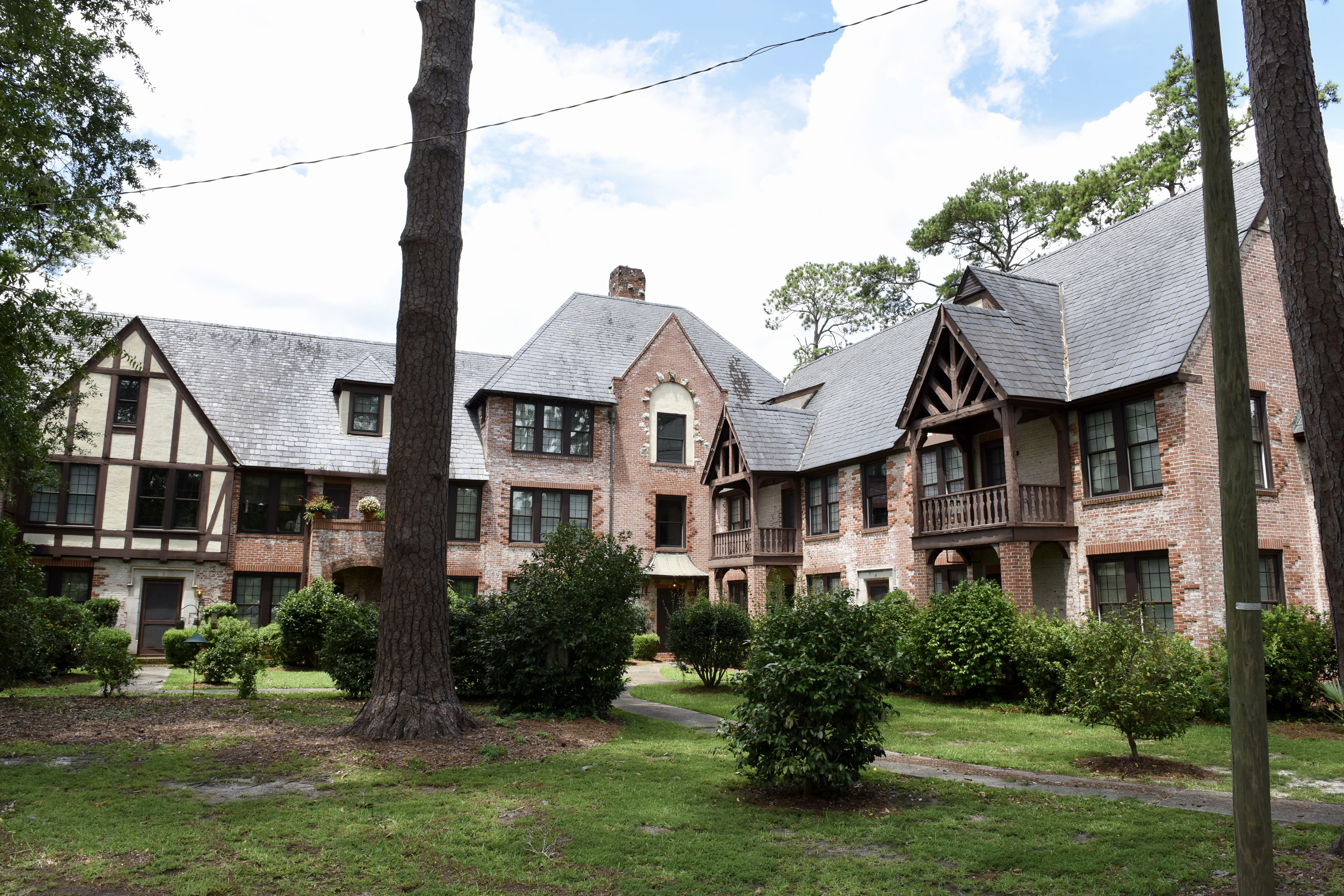

- Location within Georgia Location within the United States
- Location: 424 Gordon Ave., Thomasville, Georgia
- Coordinates: 30°49′49″N 83°58′35″W
- Area: 2 acres (0.81 ha)
- Built: 1929
- Architect: Daniell and Beutell
- Architectural style: Tudor Revival
- NRHP reference No.: 83000244
- Added to NRHP: March 24, 1983

The Gordon Avenue Apartments is an apartment building at 424 Gordon Avenue in Thomasville, Georgia which is listed on the National Register of Historic Places.

It is a Tudor Revival building designed by Atlanta architects Daniell and Beutell and built in 1929.

Note that Gordon Avenue Historic District, an NRHP-listed district consisting of five houses and their grounds, is further out Gordon Avenue.
