= Cook County, Georgia =

County in Georgia, United States

- County
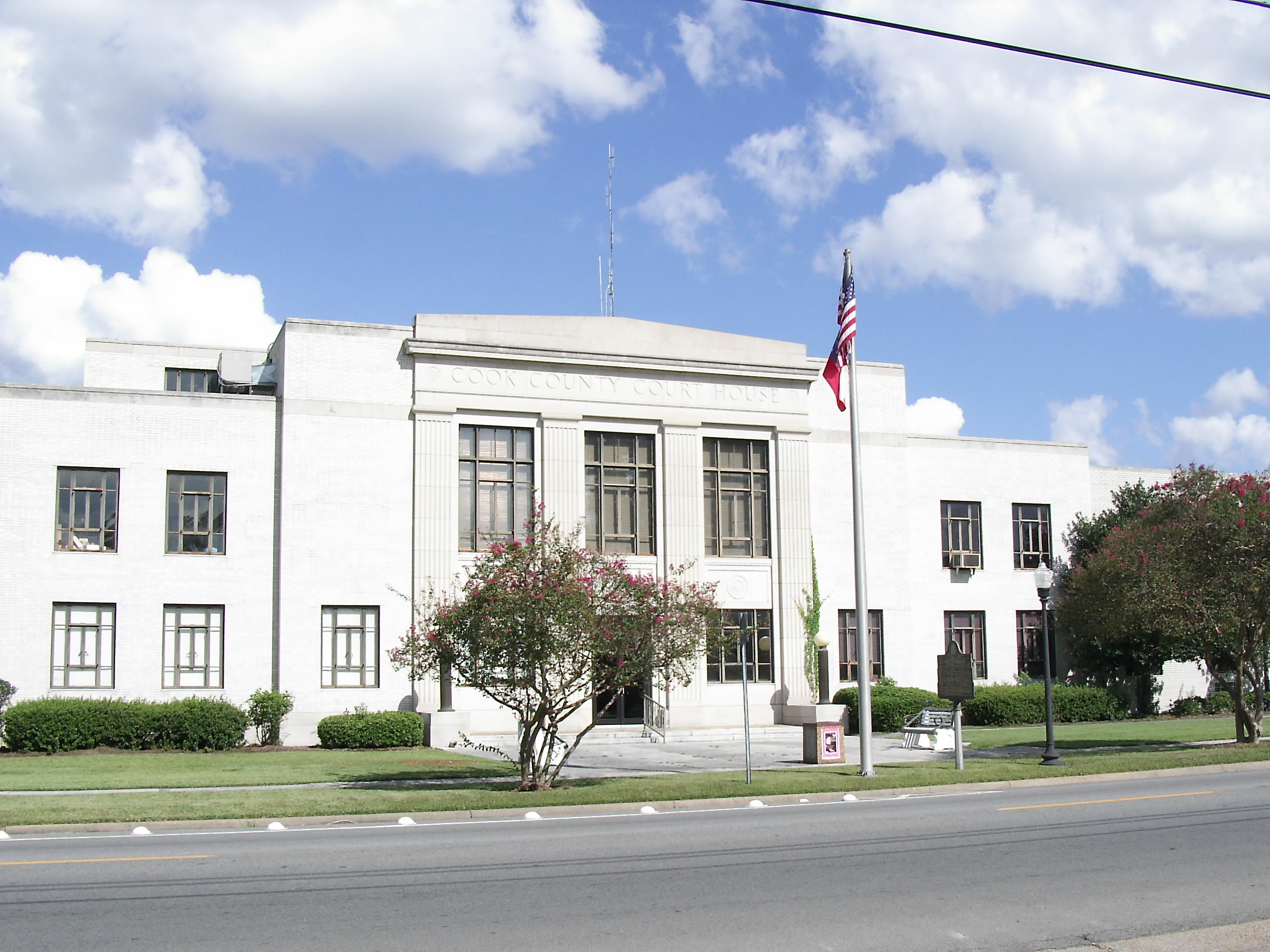
- Cook County Courthouse in Adel

- Location within the U.S. state of Georgia
- Coordinates: 31°10′00″N 83°26′00″W
- Country: United States
- State: Georgia
- Founded: 1918; 108 years ago
- Named for: Philip Cook
- Seat: Adel
- Largest city: Adel

Area
  - Total: 233 sq mi (600 km^{2})
  - Land: 227 sq mi (590 km^{2})
  - Water: 6.0 sq mi (16 km^{2}) 2.6%

Population (2020)
  - Total: 17,229
  - Estimate (2025): 18,232 ▲
  - Density: 76/sq mi (29/km^{2})
- Time zone: UTC−5 (Eastern)
  - Summer (DST): UTC−4 (EDT)
- Congressional district: 8th
- Website: www.cookcountyga.us

Cook County is a county located in the south central portion of the U.S. state of Georgia. As of the 2020 census, the population was 17,229. The county seat is Adel. The constitutional amendment to create the county was proposed July 30, 1918, and ratified November 5, 1918. It is named for former Civil War general Philip Cook of the Confederate States Army.

Reed Bingham State Park is in Cook County.

== Geography ==
According to the U.S. Census Bureau, the county has a total area of 233 square miles (600 km^{2}), of which 227 square miles (590 km^{2}) is land and 6.0 square miles (16 km^{2}) (2.6%) is water.

The western half of Cook County, located roughly west of Interstate 75, is located in the Little River sub-basin of the Suwannee River basin. The eastern half of the county is located in the Withlacoochee River sub-basin of the same Suwannee River basin.

=== Major highways ===
- Interstate 75 / State Route 401 (unsigned)
- U.S. Route 41 / State Route 7
- State Route 37
- State Route 76

=== Adjacent counties ===
- Tift County (north)
- Berrien County (east)
- Lowndes County (southeast)
- Brooks County (southwest)
- Colquitt County (west)

=== City ===
- Adel (county seat)

=== Towns ===
- Cecil
- Lenox
- Sparks

== Demographics ==
Historical population
Census	Pop.	Note	%±
1920	11,180		—
1930	11,311		1.2%
1940	11,919		5.4%
1950	12,201		2.4%
1960	11,822		−3.1%
1970	12,129		2.6%
1980	13,490		11.2%
1990	13,456		−0.3%
2000	15,771		17.2%
2010	17,212		9.1%
2020	17,229		0.1%
2025 (est.)	18,232	▲	5.8%
U.S. Decennial Census; 1790-1880 1890-1910; 1920-1930 1930-1940; 1940-1950 1960-1980; 1980-2000 2010

=== Racial and ethnic composition ===
Cook County, Georgia – Racial and ethnic composition Note: the US Census treats Hispanic/Latino as an ethnic category. This table excludes Latinos from the racial categories and assigns them to a separate category. Hispanics/Latinos may be of any race.
Race / Ethnicity (NH = Non-Hispanic)	Pop 1980	Pop 1990	Pop 2000	Pop 2010	Pop 2020	% 1980	% 1990	% 2000	% 2010	% 2020
White alone (NH)	9,341	9,155	10,526	11,171	10,658	69.24%	68.04%	66.74%	64.90%	61.86%
Black or African American alone (NH)	4,053	4,027	4,565	4,684	4,753	30.04%	29.93%	28.95%	27.21%	27.59%
Native American or Alaska Native alone (NH)	7	34	24	38	29	0.05%	0.25%	0.15%	0.22%	0.17%
Asian alone (NH)	20	22	62	113	100	0.15%	0.16%	0.39%	0.66%	0.58%
Native Hawaiian or Pacific Islander alone (NH)	x	x	5	2	4	x	x	0.03%	0.01%	0.02%
Other race alone (NH)	0	1	3	16	51	0.00%	0.01%	0.02%	0.09%	0.30%
Mixed race or Multiracial (NH)	x	x	101	164	500	x	x	0.64%	0.95%	2.90%
Hispanic or Latino (any race)	69	217	485	1,024	1,134	0.51%	1.61%	3.08%	5.95%	6.58%
Total	13,490	13,456	15,771	17,212	17,229	100.00%	100.00%	100.00%	100.00%	100.00%

=== 2020 census ===
As of the 2020 census, the county had a population of 17,229. The median age was 39.1 years. 24.9% of residents were under the age of 18 and 17.3% of residents were 65 years of age or older. For every 100 females there were 94.7 males, and for every 100 females age 18 and over there were 91.9 males age 18 and over. 40.8% of residents lived in urban areas, while 59.2% lived in rural areas.

The racial makeup of the county was 63.7% White, 27.7% Black or African American, 0.4% American Indian and Alaska Native, 0.6% Asian, 0.1% Native Hawaiian and Pacific Islander, 3.1% from some other race, and 4.4% from two or more races. Hispanic or Latino residents of any race comprised 6.6% of the population.

There were 6,432 households in the county, of which 34.6% had children under the age of 18 living with them and 29.8% had a female householder with no spouse or partner present. About 24.7% of all households were made up of individuals and 11.3% had someone living alone who was 65 years of age or older.

There were 7,258 housing units, of which 11.4% were vacant. Among occupied housing units, 64.7% were owner-occupied and 35.3% were renter-occupied. The homeowner vacancy rate was 2.0% and the rental vacancy rate was 8.5%.

== Education ==
It is within the Cook County School District. It operates Cook County High School.

== Politics ==
United States presidential election results for Cook County, Georgia
Year	Republican		Democratic		Third party(ies)	
Year	No.	%	No.	%	No.	%
1920	303	53.82%	260	46.18%	0	0.00%
1924	44	7.57%	502	86.40%	35	6.02%
1928	237	25.59%	689	74.41%	0	0.00%
1932	25	1.74%	1,408	97.78%	7	0.49%
1936	117	6.44%	1,697	93.45%	2	0.11%
1940	143	13.19%	941	86.81%	0	0.00%
1944	204	15.01%	1,155	84.99%	0	0.00%
1948	123	7.81%	1,192	75.73%	259	16.45%
1952	395	14.41%	2,347	85.59%	0	0.00%
1956	245	10.45%	2,100	89.55%	0	0.00%
1960	399	17.10%	1,935	82.90%	0	0.00%
1964	2,058	60.62%	1,337	39.38%	0	0.00%
1968	521	14.62%	605	16.98%	2,438	68.41%
1972	2,135	80.26%	525	19.74%	0	0.00%
1976	670	18.86%	2,882	81.14%	0	0.00%
1980	1,188	32.25%	2,461	66.80%	35	0.95%
1984	1,860	55.19%	1,510	44.81%	0	0.00%
1988	1,555	55.69%	1,226	43.91%	11	0.39%
1992	1,318	36.56%	1,731	48.02%	556	15.42%
1996	1,354	39.74%	1,780	52.25%	273	8.01%
2000	2,279	57.78%	1,639	41.56%	26	0.66%
2004	3,065	63.56%	1,733	35.94%	24	0.50%
2008	3,782	64.00%	2,075	35.12%	52	0.88%
2012	3,935	65.14%	2,042	33.80%	64	1.06%
2016	4,176	68.68%	1,753	28.83%	151	2.48%
2020	4,900	69.63%	2,059	29.26%	78	1.11%
2024	5,374	73.05%	1,956	26.59%	27	0.37%

United States Senate election results for Cook County, Georgia2
Year	Republican		Democratic		Third party(ies)	
Year	No.	%	No.	%	No.	%
2020	4,864	69.76%	1,963	28.16%	145	2.08%
2020	4,313	69.49%	1,894	30.51%	0	0.00%

United States Senate election results for Cook County, Georgia3
Year	Republican		Democratic		Third party(ies)	
Year	No.	%	No.	%	No.	%
2020	2,703	39.13%	1,085	15.71%	3,119	45.16%
2020	4,310	69.46%	1,895	30.54%	0	0.00%
2022	3,944	71.23%	1,497	27.04%	96	1.73%
2022	3,689	71.76%	1,452	28.24%	0	0.00%

Georgia Gubernatorial election results for Cook County
Year	Republican		Democratic		Third party(ies)	
Year	No.	%	No.	%	No.	%
2022	4,138	74.46%	1,387	24.96%	32	0.58%

As of the 2020s, Cook County is a Republican stronghold, voting 73% for Donald Trump in 2024. For elections to the United States House of Representatives, Cook County is part of Georgia's 8th congressional district, currently represented by Austin Scott. For elections to the Georgia State Senate, Cook County is part of District 11. For elections to the Georgia House of Representatives, Cook County is part of districts 170 and 172.

== See also ==
- National Register of Historic Places listings in Cook County, Georgia
- List of counties in Georgia
