= Joe M. Beutell House =

Historic house in Georgia, United States

- U.S. National Register of Historic Places
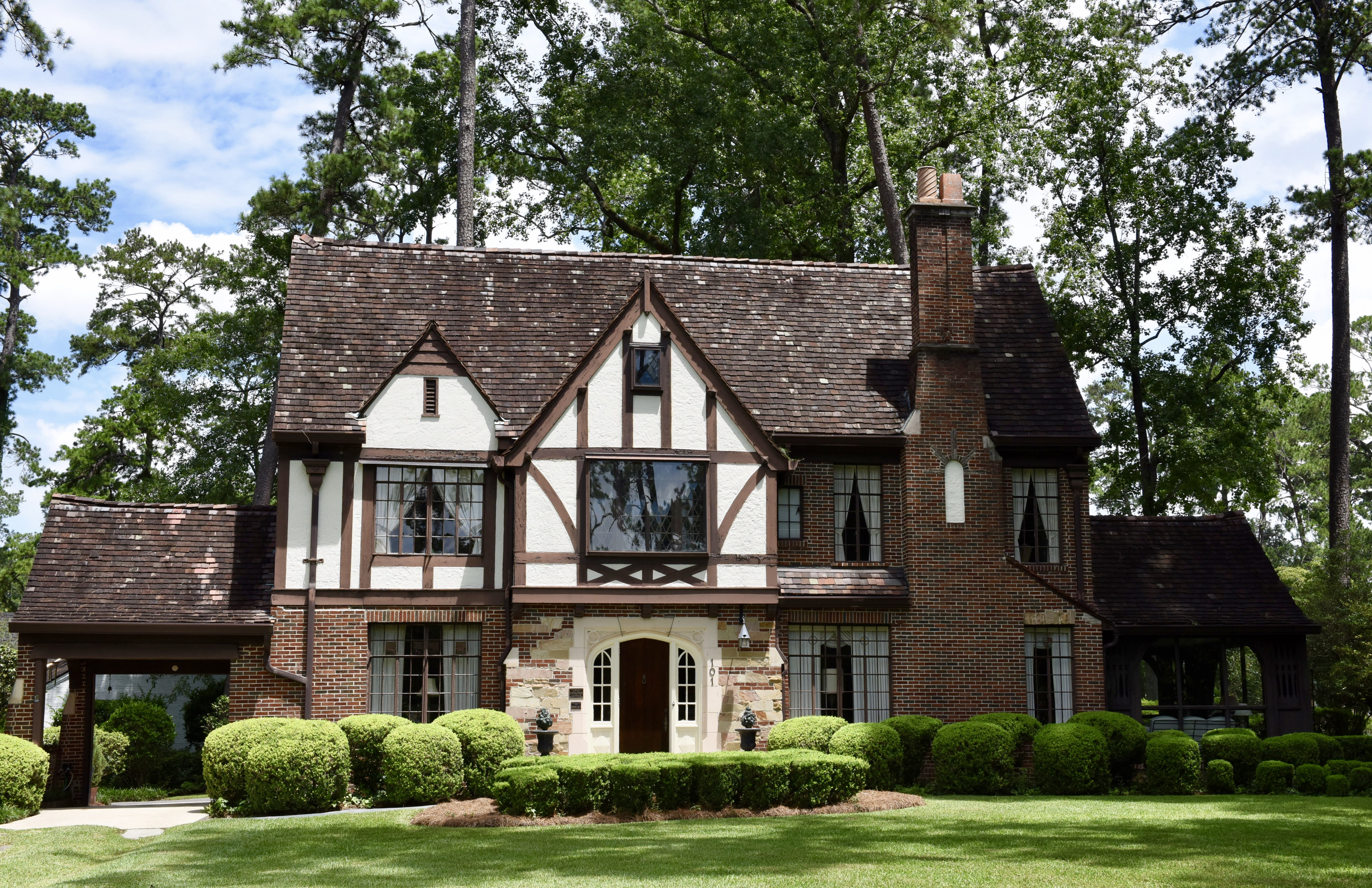

- Location within Georgia Location within the United States
- Location: 101 Montrose Dr., Thomasville, Georgia
- Coordinates: 30.84842°N 83.97121°W
- Area: 0.5 acres (0.20 ha)
- Built: 1930
- Built by: Joe M. Beutell
- Architect: Russell L. Beutell
- Architectural style: Tudor Revival
- NRHP reference No.: 91001158
- Added to NRHP: August 29, 1991

The Joe M. Beutell House in Thomasville, Georgia was built in 1930. It is notable for its Tudor Revival architecture and was listed on the National Register of Historic Places in 1991.

It was built by and for contractor Joe M. Beutell and was designed by architect Russell L. Beutell (1891–1943).

It was later the home of Judge Reason C. Bell while he was chief justice of the Georgia Supreme Court.
