= Ellenton, Georgia =

- Town
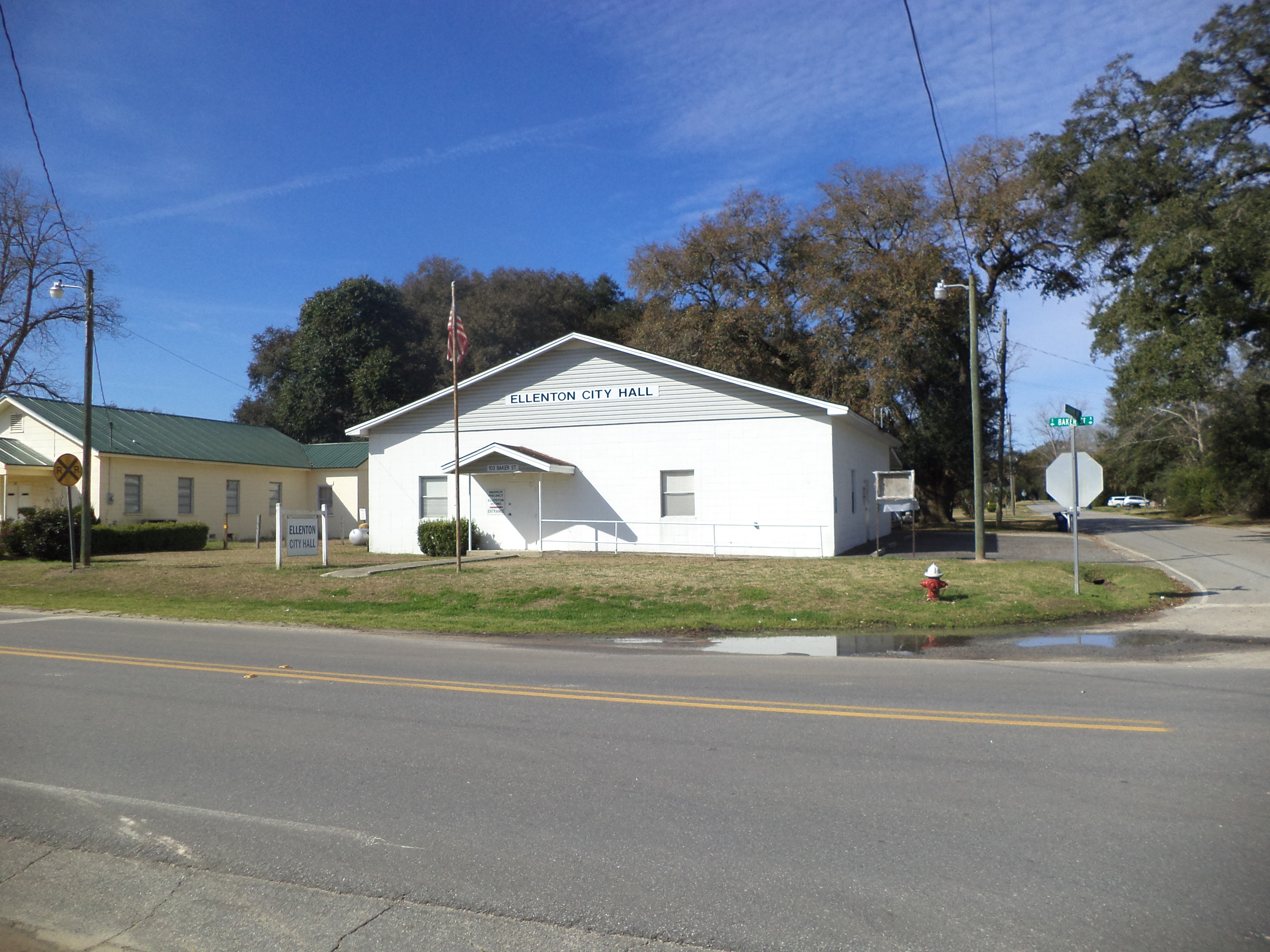
- Ellenton City Hall

- Location in Colquitt County and the state of Georgia
- Coordinates: 31°10′36″N 83°35′17″W
- Country: United States
- State: Georgia
- County: Colquitt

Area
  - Total: 0.80 sq mi (2.06 km^{2})
  - Land: 0.79 sq mi (2.05 km^{2})
  - Water: 0.0039 sq mi (0.01 km^{2})
- Elevation: 259 ft (79 m)

Population (2020)
  - Total: 210
  - Density: 265/sq mi (102.5/km^{2})
- Time zone: UTC-5 (Eastern (EST))
  - Summer (DST): UTC-4 (EDT)
- ZIP code: 31747
- Area code: 229
- FIPS code: 13-27008
- GNIS feature ID: 0331648
- Website: http://www.ellentonga.com/

Ellenton is a town in Colquitt County, Georgia, United States. Its population was 214 as at the 2024 census, down from 281 at the 2010 census. It was incorporated in 1970 by the Georgia General Assembly. It is located at 31°10′36″N 83°35′17″W (31.176563, -83.588016).

According to the United States Census Bureau, it has an area of 0.8 square miles (2.1 km^{2}), all land.

== Demographics ==
Historical population
Census	Pop.	Note	%±
1930	297		—
1940	427		43.8%
1950	429		0.5%
1960	385		−10.3%
1970	337		−12.5%
1980	277		−17.8%
1990	227		−18.1%
2000	336		48.0%
2010	281		−16.4%
2020	210		−25.3%
U.S. Decennial Census; 1850-1870 1870-1880; 1890-1910 1920-1930; 1940 1950 1960; 1970 1980 1990; 2000 2010

As of the census of 2000, there were 336 people, 109 households, and 81 families residing in the town. In 2020, its population was 210.
