= Adel, Georgia =

- City
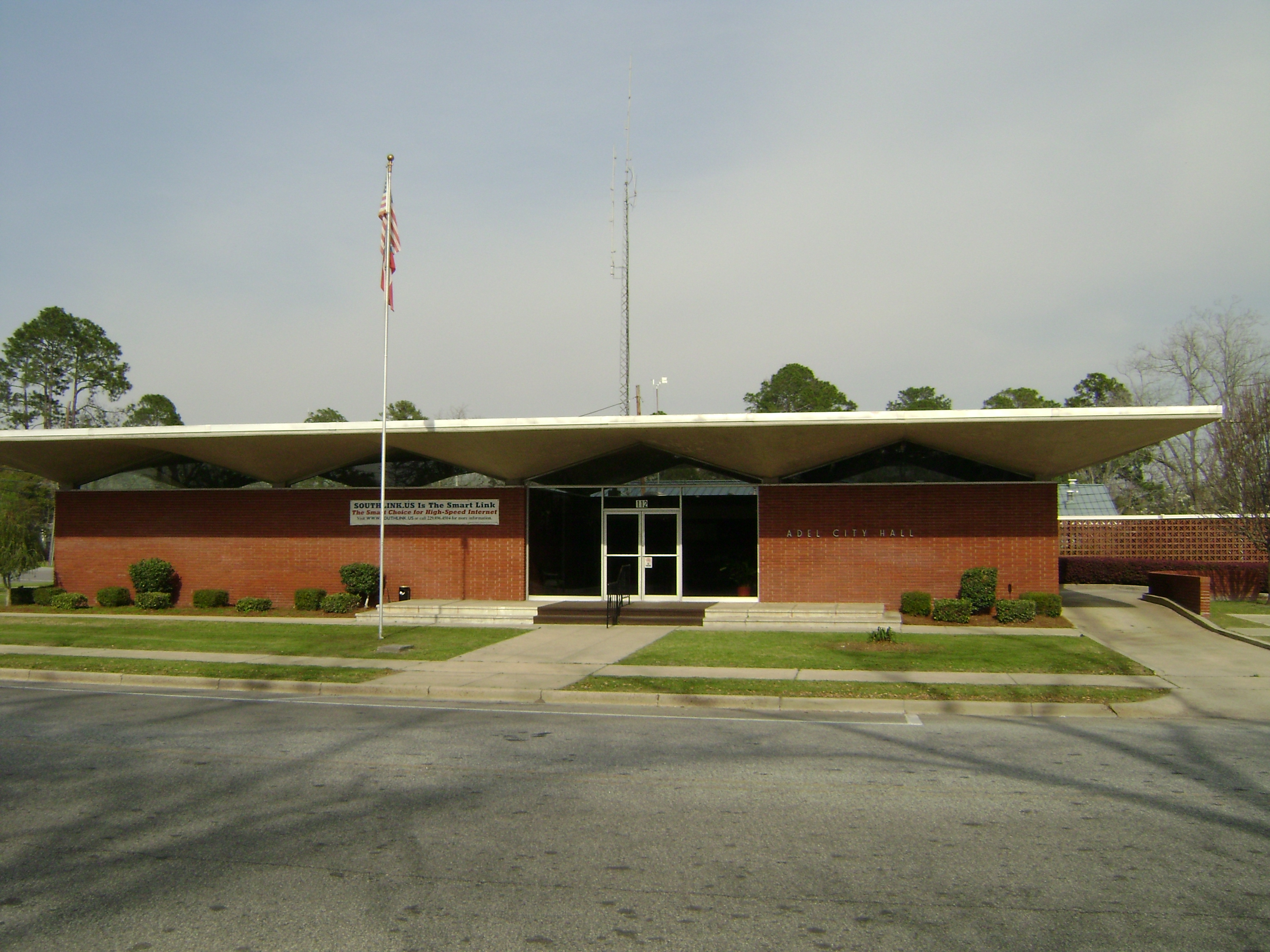
- Adel City Hall

- Seal

- Location in Cook County and the state of Georgia
- Coordinates: 31°8′18″N 83°25′33″W
- Country: United States
- State: Georgia
- County: Cook

Government
  - Mayor: Buddy Duke

Area
  - Total: 9.46 sq mi (24.50 km^{2})
  - Land: 9.30 sq mi (24.09 km^{2})
  - Water: 0.16 sq mi (0.42 km^{2})
- Elevation: 240 ft (73 m)

Population (2020)
  - Total: 5,571
  - Density: 599.0/sq mi (231.28/km^{2})
- Time zone: UTC-5 (Eastern (EST))
  - Summer (DST): UTC-4 (EDT)
- ZIP code: 31620
- Area code: 229
- FIPS code: 13-00576
- GNIS feature ID: 0354262
- Website: www.cityofadelga.gov

Adel (/ˈeɪdɛl/) is a city in and the county seat of Cook County, Georgia, United States, about 26 miles (42 km) north of Valdosta and 52 miles (84 km) southeast of Albany. As of the 2020 census, the city had a population of 5,571.

== History ==
The original name of the city was Puddleville. The city's first postmaster, Joel "Uncle Jack" Parrish, wanted to change the name of the city. It is believed that he saw the name "Philadelphia" on a croaker sack and struck out the first and last four letters to create the present name of Adel.

The Georgia Southern and Florida Railway arrived in Adel in the 1880s. Adel was incorporated as a town in 1889.

The South Georgia Motorsports Park opened in 2004 with a quarter-mile dragstrip and a half-mile paved oval. It is set to host the NHRA Southern Nationals in 2026.

=== Tornadoes ===
On January 22, 2017, a low-end EF3 tornado struck the extreme southern portion of Adel. Sunshine Acres, a local mobile home park, experienced severe damage, with over 20 homes destroyed and others damaged; seven residents were killed and an indeterminate number were injured or displaced. The tornado ultimately killed 14 people. An EF1 tornado also moved through the city on April 23, 2020 On January 22, 2023, a low-end EF2 tornado caused major damage on the north side of town.

== Geography ==
Adel is located just south of the center of Cook County at 31°8′18″N 83°25′33″W (31.138466, -83.425944). It is bordered to the north by Sparks. U.S. Route 41 passes through the center of town as Hutchinson Avenue, and Interstate 75 passes through the western side of the city, with access from Exit 39.

According to the United States Census Bureau, Adel has a total area of 8.2 square miles (21.3 km^{2}), of which 8.1 square miles (20.9 km^{2}) is land and 0.19 square miles (0.5 km^{2}), or 2.21%, is water.

The climate in this area is characterized by relatively high temperatures and evenly distributed precipitation throughout the year. According to the Köppen Climate Classification system, Adel has a humid subtropical climate, abbreviated "Cfa" on climate maps.

== Demographics ==
Historical population
Census	Pop.	Note	%±
1890	527		—
1900	721		36.8%
1910	1,902		163.8%
1920	1,720		−9.6%
1930	1,796		4.4%
1940	2,134		18.8%
1950	2,776		30.1%
1960	4,321		55.7%
1970	4,972		15.1%
1980	5,592		12.5%
1990	5,093		−8.9%
2000	5,307		4.2%
2010	5,334		0.5%
2020	5,571		4.4%
U.S. Decennial Census; 1850-1870 1870-1880; 1890-1910 1920-1930; 1940 1950 1960; 1970 1980 1990; 2000 2010

=== Racial and ethnic composition ===
Adel city, Georgia – Racial and ethnic composition Note: the US Census treats Hispanic/Latino as an ethnic category. This table excludes Latinos from the racial categories and assigns them to a separate category. Hispanics/Latinos may be of any race.
Race / Ethnicity (NH = Non-Hispanic)	Pop 2000	Pop 2010	Pop 2020	% 2000	% 2010	% 2020
White alone (NH)	2,450	2,395	2,385	46.17%	44.90%	42.81%
Black or African American alone (NH)	2,581	2,407	2,485	48.63%	45.13%	44.61%
Native American or Alaska Native alone (NH)	4	9	9	0.08%	0.17%	0.16%
Asian alone (NH)	40	56	61	0.75%	1.05%	1.09%
Native Hawaiian or Pacific Islander alone (NH)	5	0	2	0.09%	0.00%	0.04%
Other race alone (NH)	0	0	15	0.00%	0.00%	0.27%
Mixed race or Multiracial (NH)	26	48	166	0.49%	0.90%	2.98%
Hispanic or Latino (any race)	201	419	448	3.79%	7.86%	8.04%
Total	5,307	5,334	5,571	100.00%	100.00%	100.00%

=== 2020 census ===
As of the 2020 census, Adel had a population of 5,571. The median age was 37.2 years. 25.6% of residents were under the age of 18 and 16.9% of residents were 65 years of age or older. For every 100 females there were 93.2 males, and for every 100 females age 18 and over there were 89.4 males age 18 and over.

93.2% of residents lived in urban areas, while 6.8% lived in rural areas.

There were 2,107 households in Adel, of which 34.8% had children under the age of 18 living in them. Of all households, 36.6% were married-couple households, 20.3% were households with a male householder and no spouse or partner present, and 36.5% were households with a female householder and no spouse or partner present. About 29.0% of all households were made up of individuals and 12.0% had someone living alone who was 65 years of age or older. There were 1,108 families residing in the city.

There were 2,418 housing units, of which 12.9% were vacant. The homeowner vacancy rate was 4.1% and the rental vacancy rate was 8.1%.

Racial composition as of the 2020 census
Race	Number	Percent
White	2,492	44.7%
Black or African American	2,499	44.9%
American Indian and Alaska Native	24	0.4%
Asian	61	1.1%
Native Hawaiian and Other Pacific Islander	5	0.1%
Some other race	233	4.2%
Two or more races	257	4.6%

== Education ==
=== Cook County School District ===
The Cook County School District holds pre-school to grade twelve, and consists of two elementary schools, a middle school, and a high school. The district has 188 full-time teachers and over 3,215 students.

- Cook Primary School
- Cook Elementary School
- Cook Middle School
- Cook High School

=== Library ===
Adel is served by the Cook County Public Library.

== Notable people ==
- Ray McKinnon – actor and producer
- Kaleb Cowart – baseball player (LA Angels 2015–2019)
- Eugene Patterson
- Donald S. Bryan- WW2 Fighter Pilot Ace
- Kenny Tippins- NFL player
- Robert Lester Folsom- Musician
